= Architects of the National Park Service =

Architects of the National Park Service are the architects and landscape architects who were employed by the National Park Service (NPS) starting in 1918 to design buildings, structures, roads, trails and other features in the United States National Parks. Many of their works are listed on the National Register of Historic Places, and a number have also been designated as National Historic Landmarks.

The National Park Service was established in 1916, and Charles Punchard, Jr. became its first landscape architect in July 1918. Punchard died in 1920 and was replaced by his assistant, Daniel Ray Hull. In 1922, Hull hired Thomas Chalmers Vint as a draftsman. Vint became the head of the Landscape Architectural Division after Hull retired in 1927. Vint remained with the NPS until he retired in 1961 and is credited with directing and shaping landscape planning and development at the NPS. Vint also significantly expanded the design group's staffing in the late 1920s and 1930s, starting in 1928 with Merel S. Sager. The NPS Branch of Plans and Designs was organized in 1933. Vint was appointed as the first chief architect, with Charles E. Peterson in charge of the Eastern Division and William G. Carnes in charge of the Western Division. Carnes replaced Vint as the Chief Landscape Architect, and in 1956, Sager succeeded Carnes in that position.

Other significant architects and landscape architects who were employed by NPS include Herbert Maier, John Wosky, Harold G. Fowler, Cecil J. Doty, Lyle E. Bennett, A. Paul Brown, Mark Daniels, Ernest A. Davidson, Herbert Kreinkemp, Harry Langley, William Haussmann, and Ken Saunders.

Much of the work of the NPS architects is in a "rustic" style that has become known as "National Park Service rustic" architecture.

One of the distinctive features of architecture of the National Park Service is the blending of traditional architecture and landscape architecture. Vint and others experimented with use of stone and logs to construct buildings in a natural way, following example of landscape architect Frederick Law Olmsted. Vint also provided the first master plan for many Park Service units in his 1931 plan for Mount Rainier National Park. It established the principle of designating specific areas as wilderness.

Several private architects, though not the subject of this article, also made important contributions to the development of the NPS rustic architectural style. Gilbert Stanley Underwood designed several important rustic works in the National Parks, including Old Faithful Lodge (1923), Bryce Canyon Lodge (1925), Ahwahnee Hotel (1926), Zion Lodge (1927), and Grand Canyon Lodge (1928). Mary Colter also contributed a number of important early works, including the Mary Jane Colter buildings at Grand Canyon National Park.

== Works ==
Works attributed to the architects of the National Park Service or to its architect subgroups, include the following (with attribution variations). Some works are specifically noted to be done by the "NPS Landscape Architecture Division" or the "NPS Landscape Engineering Division"; some are noted to be works of the "NPS Office of Design & Construction" or the "NPS Branch of Plans and Design".

=== Alaska ===
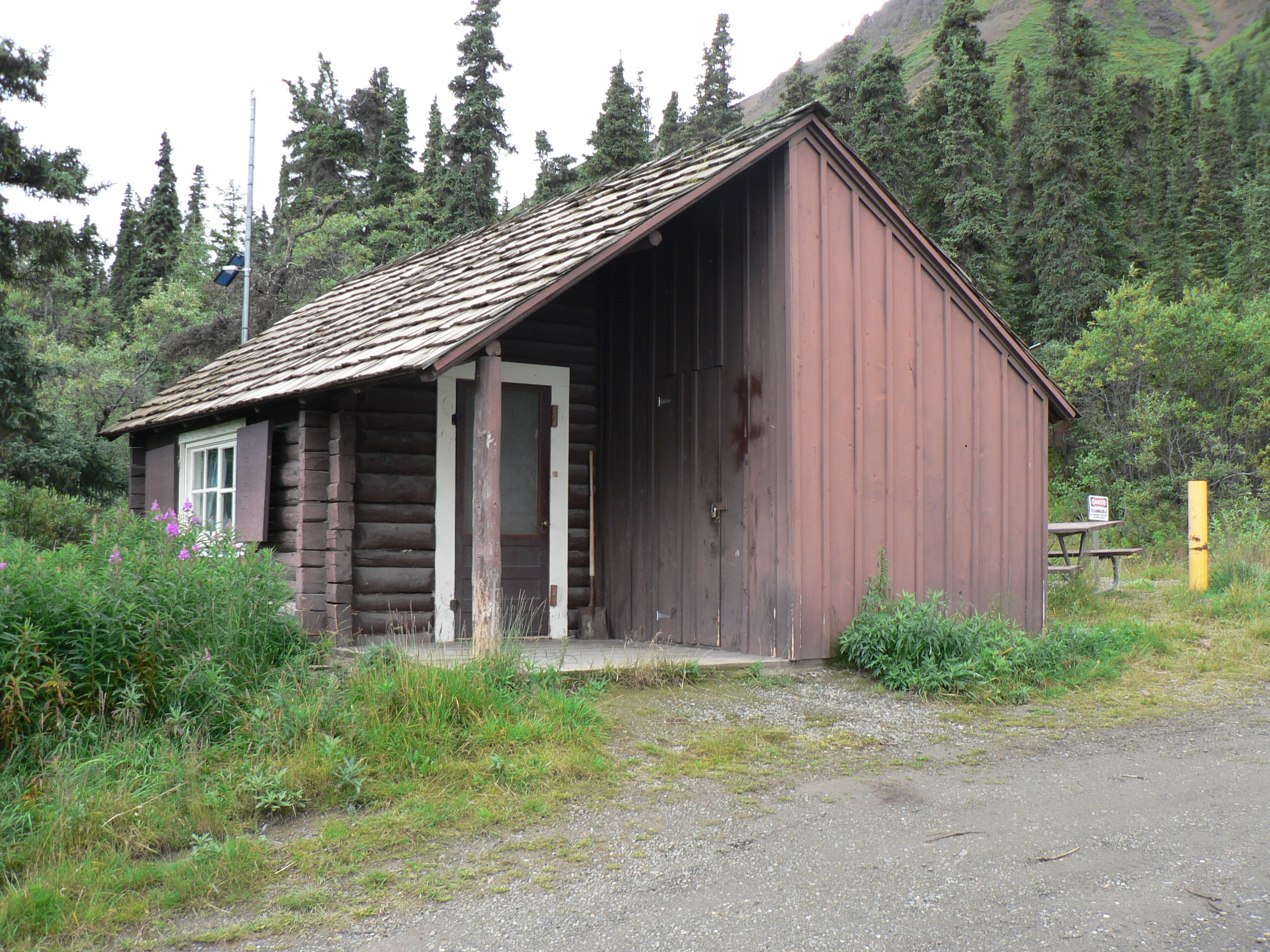
Upper Toklat River Cabin No. 24, built in 1931 to a standard design of the NPS Branch of Plans and Designs

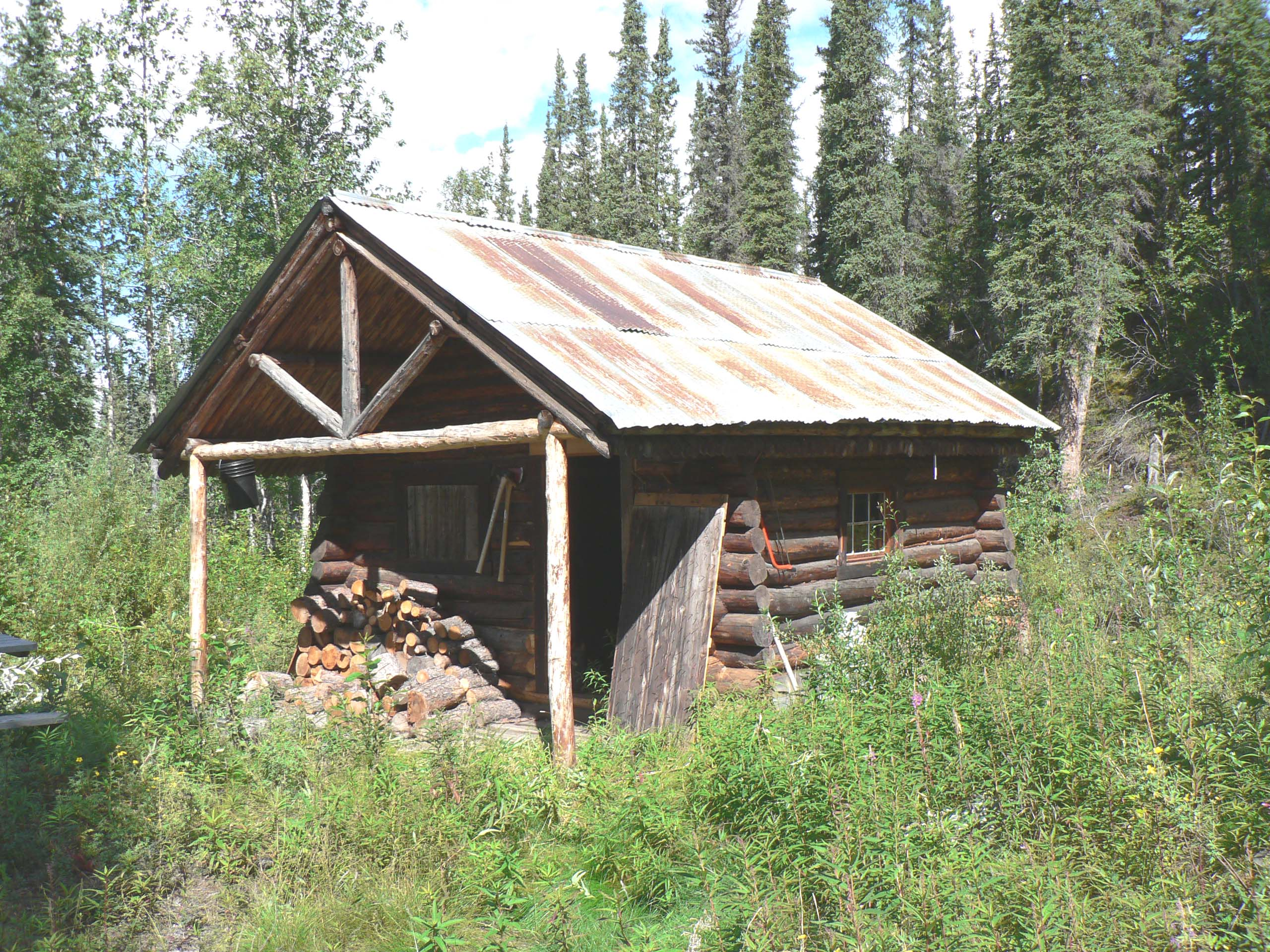
Lower Toklat River Ranger Cabin No. 18, in a National Park Service style originated at Yellowstone

==== Denali National Park and Preserve ====
- Ewe Creek Ranger Cabin No. 8, also known as Lower Savage River Cabin, 5 miles downstream on the Savage River from Park Highway near Ewe Creek, Denali National Park and Preserve, Alaska (National Park Service), NRHP-listed
- Lower East Fork Ranger Cabin No. 9, 25 miles downstream on the east fork of the Toklat River from Park Rd., Denali National Park and Preserve, Alaska (National Park Service), NRHP-listed
- Lower Toklat River Ranger Cabin No. 18, 30 miles north on Toklat River from Park Rd., Denali National Park and Preserve, Alaska (National Park Service), NRHP-listed
- Lower Windy Creek Ranger Cabin No. 15, east of Mile 324 on Alaska Railroad, Denali National Park and Preserve, Alaska (National Park Service), NRHP-listed
- Moose Creek Ranger Cabin No. 19, also known as Moose Creek Shelter Cabin, 5 miles north of Mile 73.8 on Park Rd., Denali National Park and Preserve, Alaska (National Park Service), NRHP-listed
- Mount McKinley National Park Headquarters District, Mile 3.4 McKinley Park Hwy., Denali National Park and Preserve, Alaska (most buildings designed by National Park Service architects), NRHP-listed
- Upper Toklat River Cabin No. 24, built in 1931 in a standard design of the NPS Branch of Plans and Designs, near main branch of Toklat River at Mile 53.7, west of Park Rd., Denali National Park and Preserve, Alaska (National Park Service), NRHP-listed and was built in 1931.

=== Arizona ===
==== Grand Canyon National Park ====
- Grand Canyon National Park Superintendent's Residence (1921), Off Route 8A, in Grand Canyon National Park, Grand Canyon, Arizona (designed in 1921 by Daniel Ray Hull of the National Park Service Branch of Plans and Designs; altered in 1931 by Thomas Chalmers Vint)
- Grand Canyon North Rim Headquarters, North Rim, Grand Canyon, Arizona (built by National Park Service and Civilian Conservation Corps; architect unknown), NRHP-listed
- Grand Canyon Park Operations Building (1929), off West Rim Dr., Grand Canyon National Park, Arizona (National Park Service Landscape Division), NRHP-listed
- Grand Canyon South Rim Ranger's Dormitory (1920-1921), off Arizona Route 64, Grand Canyon National Park, Grand Canyon, Arizona (designed by Daniel Ray Hull of the National Park Service Branch of Plans and Designs)
- Grand Canyon Village Historic District, Grand Canyon, Arizona (1924 master plan by National Park Service landscape architect Daniel Ray Hull; includes Park Service employee residences built under direction of Hull and Thomas Chalmers Vint)
- Trans-Canyon Telephone Line, Grand Canyon National Park, Grand Canyon along Bright Angel & North Kaibab Trails from South Rim to Roaring Springs & South Kaibab Trail to Tipoff, Grand Canyon, Arizona (National Park Service), NRHP-listed

==== Other ====
- Painted Desert Inn (1937-1940), Petrified Forest National Park, west of Navajo County, Arizona (Lyle E. Bennett for the National Park Service), NRHP-listed
- Tumacácori National Historical Park, formerly known as Tumacácori National Monument, on Interstate 19 18 miles north of Nogales, Arizona (museum designed by Scofield DeLong, Charles D. Carter and other NPS personnel), NRHP-listed

=== California ===
==== Yosemite National Park ====
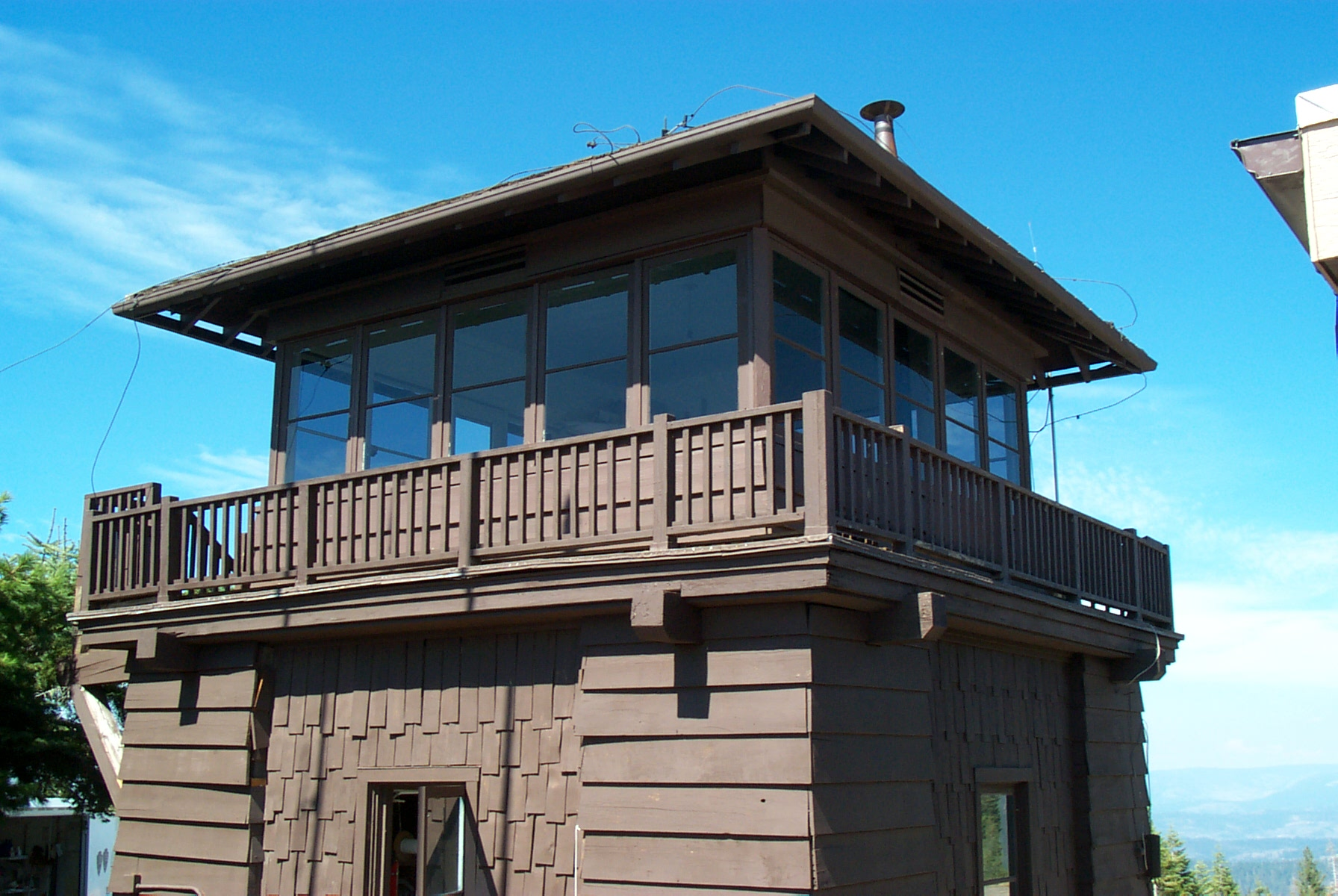
Crane Flat Fire Lookout, Yosemite, built in 1931, a two-story structure with a lower storage level and an upper observation level, with an overhanging roof, designed by the National Park Service's Landscape Division to blend with surroundings.

- Crane Flat Fire Lookout (1931), north of Big Oak Flat Rd., near Crane Creek, Yosemite National Park, Aspen Valley, California (NPS Landscape Division prepared plans for the structure; NPS landscape architect John Wosky planned the site), NRHP-listed

Specifically designed as a National Park Service lookout intended to blend with its surroundings, in contrast to the metal towers used by the U.S. Forest Service. This lookout was highlighted by Thomas Chalmers Vint as a prototype for general use.

- Glacier Point Trailside Museum (1924), also known as Glacier Point Lookout, Yosemite National Park, east of El Portal, California (NPS architects Herbert Maier and Ansel Hall), NRHP-listed
- Mariposa Grove Museum (1930), Yosemite National Park, southeast of Wawona, California (National Park Service), NRHP-listed
- Merced Grove Ranger Station (1933-1935), Yosemite National Park, north of El Portal, California (National Park Service), NRHP-listed
- Tioga Pass Entrance Station (1931-1934), Yosemite National Park, southwest of Lee Vining, California (National Park Service), NRHP-listed
- Tuolumne Meadows, Yosemite National Park, southwest of Lee Vining, California (National Park Service), NRHP-listed
- Tuolumne Meadows Ranger Stations and Comfort Stations (1924-1936), Yosemite National Park, southwest of Lee Vining, California (National Park Service), NRHP-listed
- Yosemite Valley Bridges (1922-1933), 8 bridges, mostly over the Merced River, Yosemite National Park, Yosemite Village, California (Bureau of Public Roads provided the engineering, design and construction, with the National Park Service involved through review by its landscape architecture and engineering divisions), NRHP-listed
- Yosemite Village Historic District, Yosemite National Park (overall layout and road pattern by NPS landscape architect Charles Punchard, Jr.; Post Office and Yosemite Museum/Valley District Building by NPS architect Herbert Maier; Administration Building by private architect Myron Hunt; Ranger's Club by private architect Charles K. Sumner), NRHP-listed

==== Sequoia National Park ====
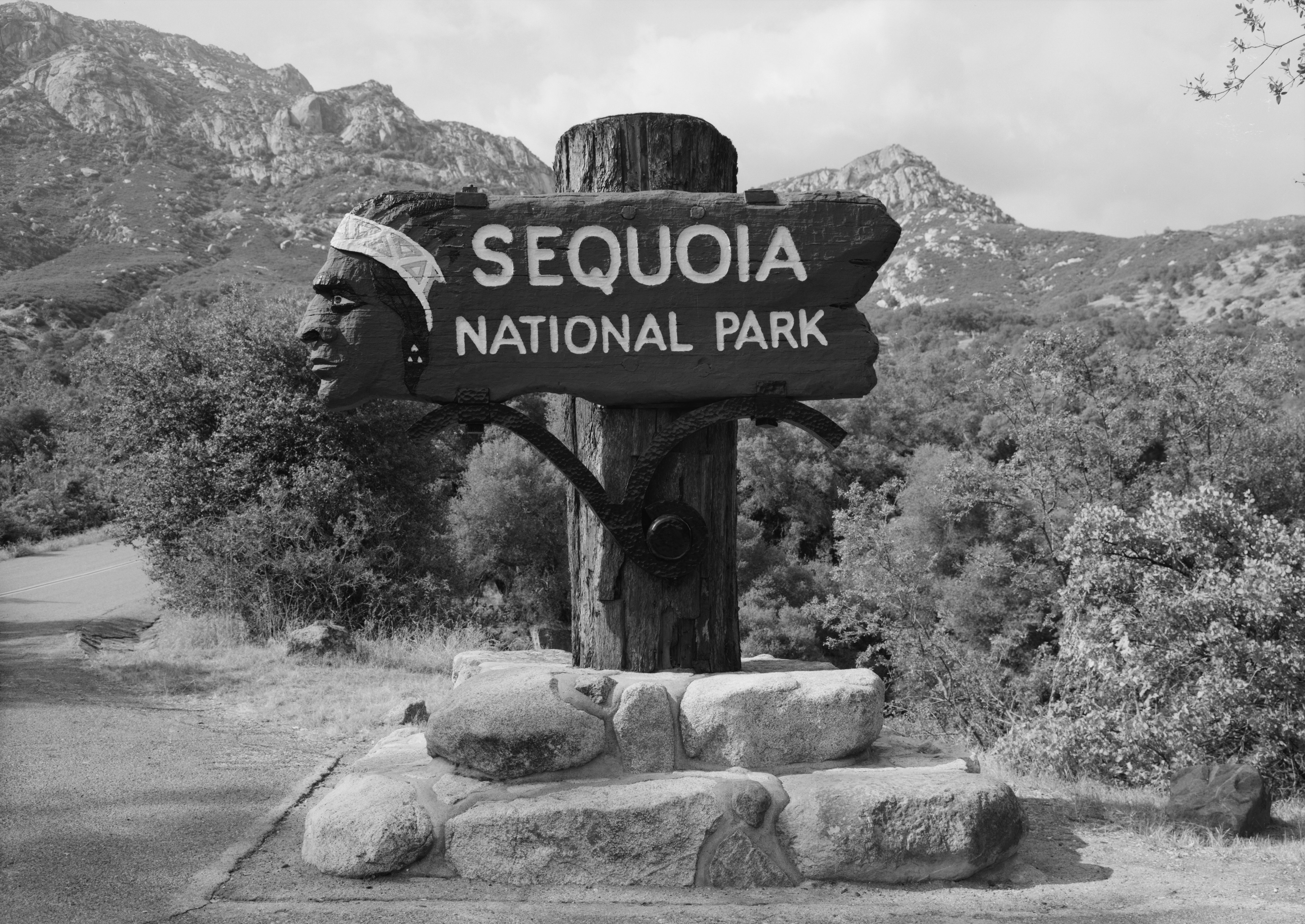
Ash Mountain Entrance Sign

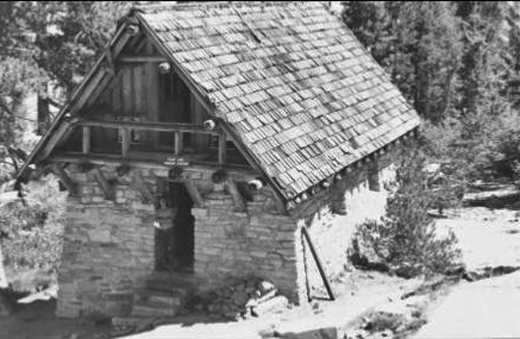
Pear Lake Ski Hut

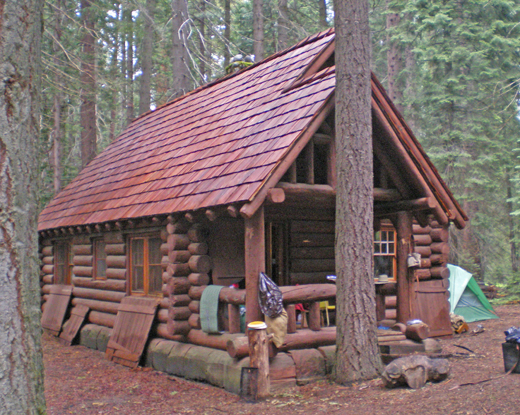
Redwood Meadow Ranger Station

- Ash Mountain Entrance Sign, Sequoia National Park (design by NPS architects Merel S. Sager and Harold G. Fowler), NRHP-listed
- Cabin Creek Ranger Residence and Dormitory, off Generals Highway in Sequoia National Park, southeast of Wilsonia, California (National Park Service: landscape architect Harold G. Fowler; Emergency Conservation Work landscape architect Lloyd Fletcher), NRHP-listed
- Generals' Highway Stone Bridges (1930-1931), Sequoia National Park, north of Mineral King, California (John Wosky of NPS Division of Landscape Architecture on the Clover Creek and Marble Fork Bridges), NRHP-listed
- Giant Forest Village-Camp Kaweah Historic District, Sequoia National Park (camp cabins laid out according to a plan developed by NPS landscape architect Merel S. Sager; NPS landscape engineer Daniel Ray Hull established the Giant Forest Village site), NRHP-listed
- Hockett Meadow Ranger Station (1934), Sequoia National Park, south of Silver City, California (National Park Service), NRHP-listed
- Moro Rock Stairway (1931), Sequoia National Park, north of Three Rivers, California (NPS landscape architect Merel S. Sager and engineer Frank Diehl), NRHP-listed
- Pear Lake Ski Hut (1939-1941), Sequoia National Park, north of Mineral King, California ("one of the most environmentally successful alpine structures ever designed by the NPS"), NRHP-listed
- Redwood Meadow Ranger Station (1938-1941), Sequoia National Park, vicinity of Three Rivers, California (National Park Service), NRHP-listed

==== Lassen Volcanic National Park ====
- Horseshoe Lake Ranger Station (1934), Lassen Volcanic National Park, on Horseshoe Lake north of Chester, California (National Park Service architects), NRHP-listed
- Park Headquarters (1929), Lassen Volcanic National Park (designed by G. W. Norgard of the NPS Branch of Plans and Designs), NRHP-listed
- Summit Lake Ranger Station (1926), Lassen Volcanic National Park, northeast of Mineral, California (National Park Service), NRHP-listed
- Warner Valley Ranger Station (1926), Lassen Volcanic National Park, north of Chester, California (National Park Service), NRHP-listed

=== Colorado ===
==== Rocky Mountain National Park ====
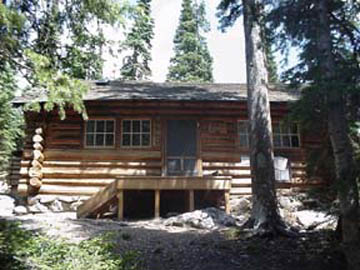
Fern Lake Patrol Cabin

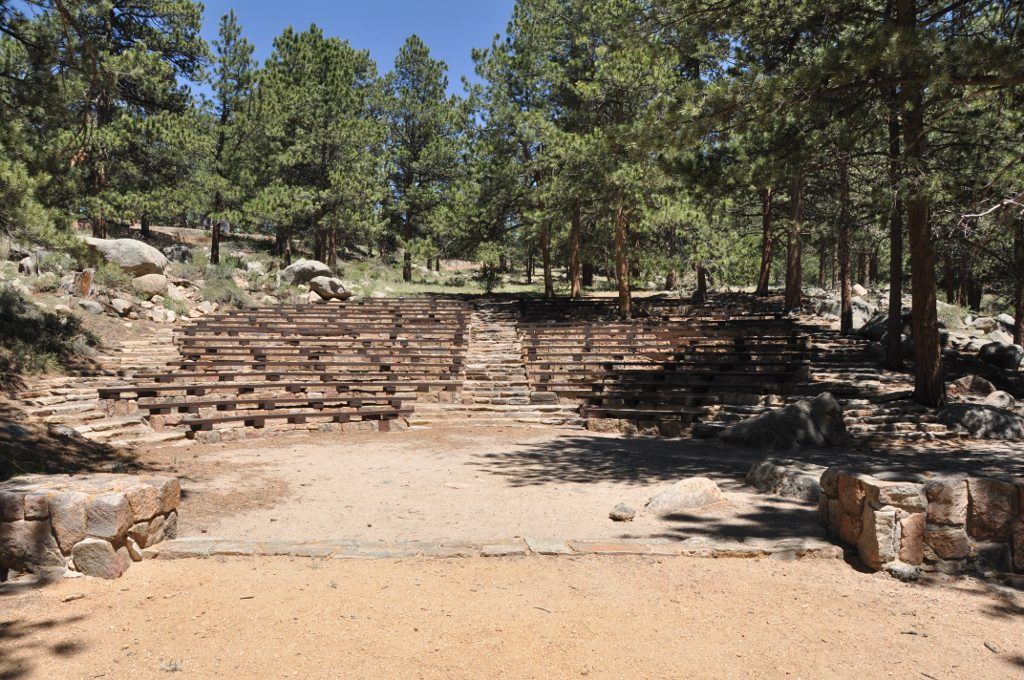
Moraine Park Amphitheater

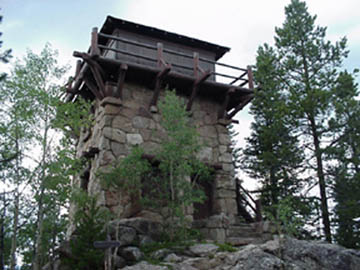
Shadow Mountain Lookout

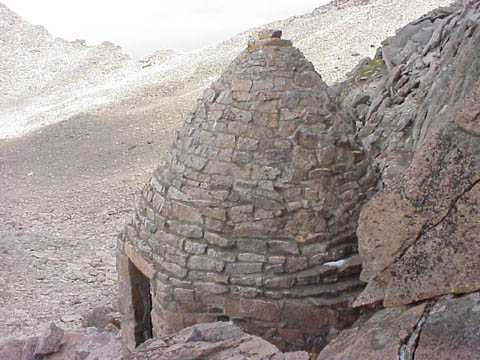
Agnes Vaille Shelter

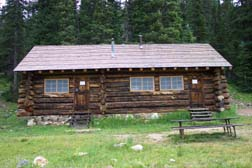
Willow Park Patrol Cabin

- Bear Lake Comfort Station (1940), Rocky Mountain National Park, Bear Lake, Estes Park, Colorado (designed by W. C. Hill, working under Howard W. Baker, Regional Landscape Architect, NPS Branch of Plans and Design), NRHP-listed
- East Inlet Trail, west side of Rocky Mountain National Park, 6.9 miles from Grand Lake to Lake Verna (trail existed in 1914; first NPS construction by 1924; rebuilt in 1931 under leadership of L.S. Moore; listed in part due to its reflecting NPS Naturalistic Design), NRHP-listed
- Fall River Pass Ranger Station, Rocky Mountain National Park, Fall River Pass (designed by Daniel Ray Hull, landscape engineer for NPS), NRHP-listed.
- Fall River Pump House and Catchment Basin, near the top of Fall River Rd., Rocky Mountain National Park, Estes Park, Colorado (L. Fletcher and W. G. Hill, landscape architects with the National Park Service), NRHP-listed
- Fall River Entrance Historic District, Rocky Mountain National Park, Fall River Entrance, Estes Park, Colorado (three buildings designed by Edward A. Nickel, Associate Structural Engineer, NPS Branch of Plans and Design, Western Division), NRHP-listed
- Fern Lake Patrol Cabin (1925), Rocky Mountain National Park, Fern Lake, Estes Park, Colorado (designed by members of the NPS Landscape Engineering Division in Los Angeles under supervision of Daniel Ray Hull), NRHP-listed
- Fern Lake Trail, Rocky Mountain National Park, Estes Park, Colorado, (trail reworked by NPS landscape architects in 1933; rebuilt by CCC workers), NRHP-listed
- Flattop Mountain Trail, Rocky Mountain Park, Estes Park, Colorado, (National Park Service and Civilian Conservation Corps), NRHP-listed
- Glacier Basin Campground Ranger Station (1930), Rocky Mountain National Park, Glacier Basin, Estes Park, Colorado, (NPS Branch of Plans and Designs), NRHP-listed
- Lake Haiyaha Trail (1930-1935), also known as Nymph Lake Trail and Dream Lake Trail, Rocky Mountain National Park, 2.1 miles roughly along Bear, Nymph & Dream Lakes, then up Chaos Canyon, Estes Park, Colorado, (Allison van V. Dunn, landscape architect, National Park Service), NRHP-listed
- Lost Lake Trail, also known as Sawmill Trail, Rocky Mountain National Park, 4.5 miles roughly along North Fork of the Big Thompson River, Estes Park, Colorado (rebuilt in 1934 under direction of Allison van V. Dunn, landscape architect with National Park Service), NRHP-listed
- Milner Pass Road Camp Mess Hall and House (1926), Rocky Mountain National Park, Milner Pass Road, Estes Park, Colorado (designed by personnel of NPS Landscape Engineering Division, Los Angeles, under supervision of Daniel Ray Hull; "one of the earliest structures in the park to demonstrate the 'NPS Rustic' style of architecture"), NRHP-listed
- Moraine Park Museum and Amphitheater (1934), Rocky Mountain National Park, Estes Park, Colorado (National Park Service Branch of Plans and Design), NRHP-listed
- North Inlet Trail (1926-1931), 11.5 miles roughly along North Inlet & Hallett Creek to Flattop Mountain, Grand Lake, Colorado (trail rebuilt 1926-1931; Allison van V. Dunn, an NPS landscape architect, arrived in 1929 and oversaw the final years of rebuilding), NRHP-listed
- Shadow Mountain Lookout (1932), southeast of Grand Lake in Rocky Mountain National Park, Grand Lake, Colorado (original plans by NPS Landscape Architecture Division were rejected; new plans completed by NPS Chief Forester, John Coffman), NRHP-listed
- Shadow Mountain Trail, 4.8 miles long on east side of Shadow Mountaine Lake, Grand Lake, Colorado (trail rebuilt in 1930 by National Park Service; trail design reflects NPS Naturalistic Design of the 1920s to 1940s), NRHP-listed
- Thunder Lake Patrol Cabin (1930), Rocky Mountain National Park (Howard R. Baker and Thomas Chalmers Vint of the NPS Design Staff), NRHP-listed
- Thunder Lake Trail-Bluebird Lake Trail, roughly along North Saint Vrain Creek, west of Wild Basin Ranger Station, Allens Park, Colorado (National Park Service and Civilian Conservation Corps), NRHP-listed

Upper Thunder Lake Trail reconstructed in 1929-1930 upon arrival of the park's first NPS-trained landscape architect; portions of Bluebird Lake Trail rebuilt in the late 1930s with CCC labor.

- Timber Creek Campground Comfort Stations Nos. 245, 246, and 247 (1935), Rocky Mountain National Park (Howard W. Baker of NPS Branch of Plans and Designs), NRHP-listed
- Timber Creek Road Camp Barn (1930), Rocky Mountain National Park, approximately 200 yards south of Columbine Lake Rd., 450 yards west of Kawuneeche Visitor Center, Estes Park, Colorado (designed by personnel at NPS Office of Design & Construction, San Francisco, under supervision of Thomas Chalmers Vint), NRHP-listed
- Timberline Cabin (1925), Rocky Mountain National Park, Fall River Rd., vicinity of Estes Park, Colorado (plans prepared by members of the NPS Landscape Engineering Division under supervision of T. C. Vint), NRHP-listed
- Utility Area Historic District, Rocky Mountain National Park, Beaver Meadows Entrance Rd., Estes Park, Colorado (approximately 30 contributing structures; plans by NPS Landscape Engineering Division), NRHP-listed

Nowhere in Rocky Mountain National Park is the theme of NPS Rustic Architecture exemplified better than in the Utility Area Historic District.

- Agnes Vaille Shelter (1927), near the summit of Long's Peak, less than 100 yards south of Keyhole at over 13,400 feet elevation, along East Longs Peak Trail, Rocky Mountain National Park (National Park Service design staff; NPS rustic architecture), NRHP-listed
- Wild Basin House (1931), Rocky Mountain National Park, Wild Basin, Estes Park, Colorado (plans approved by T. C. Vint, drawn by the NPS Branch of Plans and Design), NRHP-listed
- Wild Basin Ranger Station and House (1932), Rocky Mountain National Park, Wild Basin, Estes Park, Colorado (plans drawn by NPS Branch of Plans and Design), NRHP-listed
- Willow Park Patrol Cabin (1923), Rocky Mountain National Park, Fall River Rd., Estes Park, Colorado (designed by members of the NPS Landscape Engineering Division under the supervision of Daniel Ray Hull), NRHP-listed
- Willow Park Stable (1926), Rocky Mountain National Park, Fall River Pass, Estes Park, Colorado (designed by members of the NPS Landscape Engineering Division under the supervision of Daniel Ray Hull), NRHP-listed

==== Colorado National Monument ====
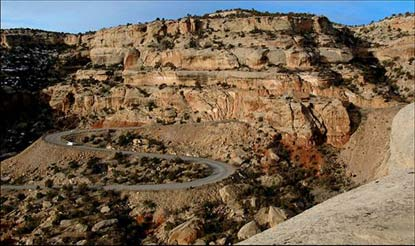
Rim Rock Drive

- Colorado National Monument Visitor Center Complex (1963-1965), Fruita, Colorado (visitor center, designed by National Park Service architect Cecil J. Doty, the Bookcliff Shelter, designed by NPS architect Phil Romigh, and the Canyon Rim Trail, designed by NPS landscape architects Babbitt Hughes)
- Devils Kitchen Picnic Shelter (1940), Colorado National Monument, Grand Junction, Colorado (designed by Harvey H. Cornell, Jerome C. Miller and Kenneth M. Saunders of the National Park Service Branch of Plans and Design), NRHP-listed
- Rim Rock Drive Historic District (1932), Colorado National Monument, Grand Junction, Colorado (road design by NPS Branch of Engineering and Branch of Plans and Design), NRHP-listed
- Saddlehorn Caretaker's House and Garage (1934), Colorado National Monument, Grand Junction, Colorado (designed by W. G. Carney of NPS Branch of Plans and Designs, Western Division), NRHP-listed
- Saddlehorn Comfort Station (1936), Colorado National Monument, Grand Junction, Colorado (H. A. Kreinkamp of NPS Branch of Plans and Designs), NRHP-listed
- Saddlehorn Utility Area Historic District (1939), Colorado National Monument, Grand Junction, Colorado (Kenneth M. Saunders of NPS Branch of Plans and Design), NRHP-listed

==== Other ====
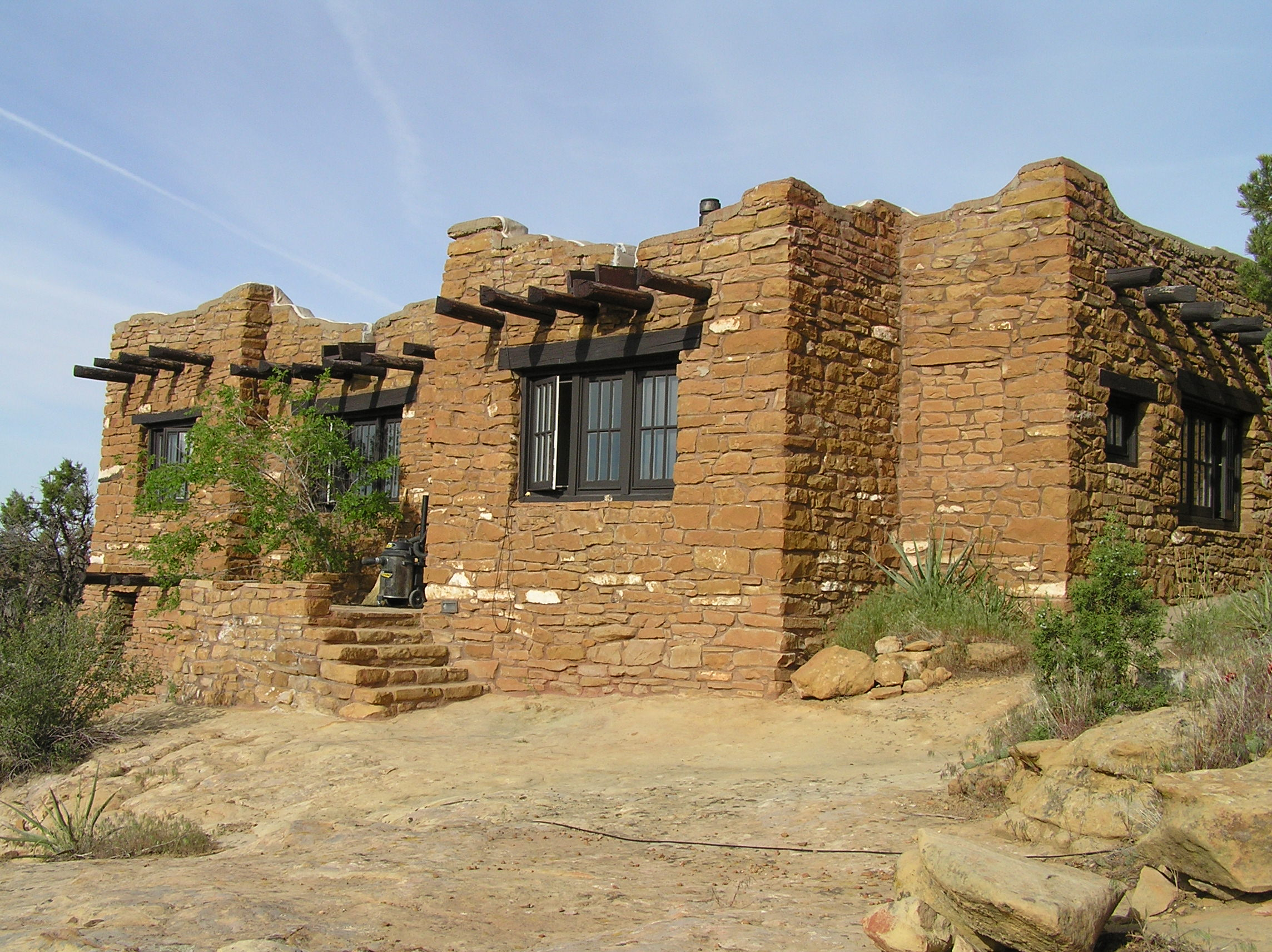
Mesa Verde Superintendent's Office

- Mesa Verde Administrative District, area at head of Spruce Canyon off park service road, Mesa Verde National Park, Colorado (NPS archeologist Jesse Nusbum and NPS Branch of Plans & Design), NRHP-listed
- North Rim Road (1933-1938), Black Canyon of the Gunnison National Park, Crawford, Colorado (designed by NPS Engineering Branch, including T.W. Secrest, with input from NPS landscape architects, including Thomas Chalmers Vint, Howard M. Baker, and Charles A. Richey), NRHP-listed

=== Florida ===
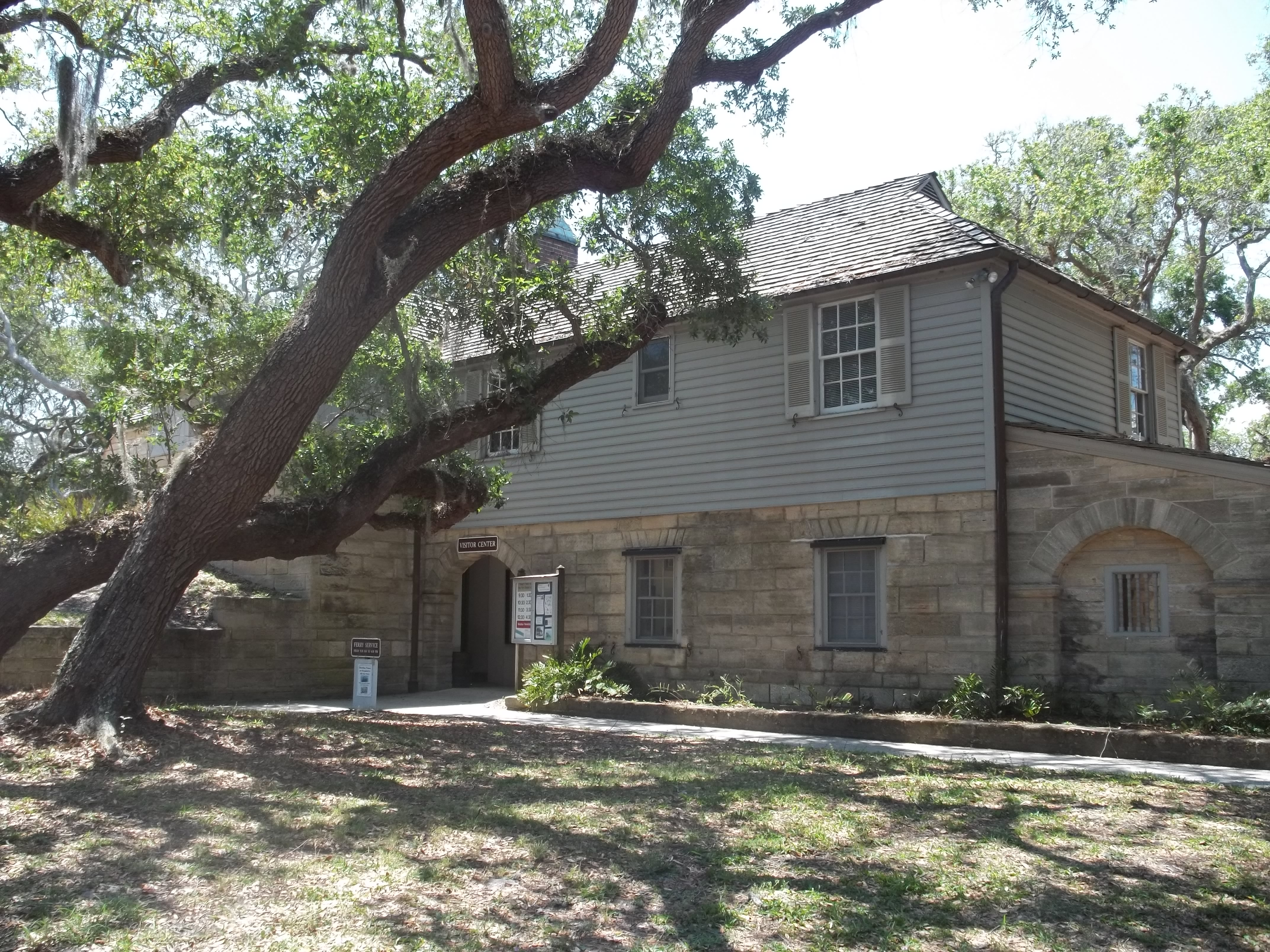
Fort Matanzas National Monument visitors center

- Fort Matanzas National Monument Headquarters and Visitor Center, 8635 A1A S., St. Augustine, Florida (NPS Eastern Div. of Plans & Design), NRHP-listed

A work of National Park Service Rustic architecture

=== Minnesota ===
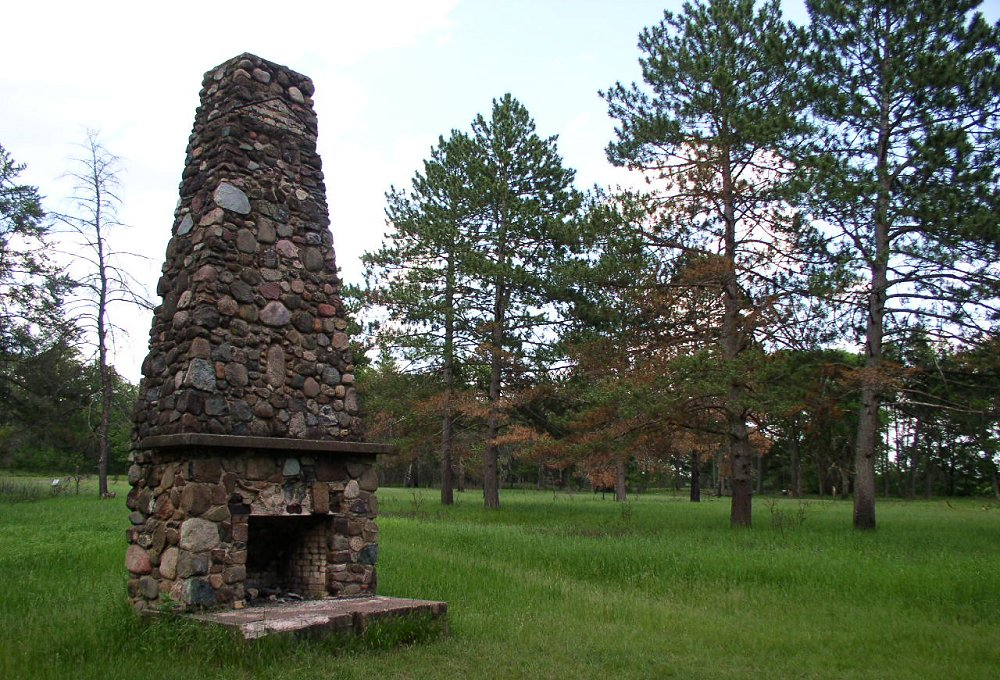
Surviving CCC camp building chimney, at St. Croix Recreational Demonstration Area

- Jay Cooke State Park CCC/WPA/Rustic Style Picnic Grounds, off Minnesota State Highway 210 southeast of Forbay Lake, Thomson Township, Carlton, Minnesota (National Park Service), NRHP-listed
- Jay Cooke State Park CCC/WPA/Rustic Style Service Yard, off Minnesota State Highway 210 east of Forbay Lake, Thomson Township, Carlton, Minnesota (National Park Service), NRHP-listed
- Interstate State Park CCC/WPA/Rustic Style Campground, off U.S. Route 8 southwest of Taylors Falls, Minnesota (National Park Service), NRHP-listed
- Lac qui Parle State Park WPA/Rustic Style Historic District, off Co. Hwy. 33 at southeast end of Lac qui Parle, Lac qui Parle Township, Montevideo, Minnesota (National Park Service), NRHP-listed
- Lake Carlos State Park WPA/Rustic Style Group Camp, off Minnesota State Highway 29 on northeast shore of Lake Carlos, Carlos Township, Carlos, Minnesota (National Park Service), NRHP-listed
- Scenic State Park CCC/Rustic Style Service Yard, off County Highway 7, Scenic State Park, Bigfork, Minnesota (National Park Service), NRHP-listed
- Scenic State Park CCC/WPA/Rustic Style Historic Resources, Off County Highway 7 east of Bigfork, Minnesota (National Park Service), NRHP-listed
- State Park CCC/Rustic Style Historic District, off U.S. Route 71 west of New London, Minnesota (National Park Service), NRHP-listed
- St. Croix Recreational Demonstration Area, off Minnesota State Highway 48, along the St. Croix National Scenic Riverway, Clover, Ogema, Crosby, Munch, and Chengwatana Townships, Hinckley, Minnesota (NPS), NRHP-listed

The National Park Service provided technical, overall expertise on the design of traffic circulation in the park, and in buildings' designs; work was done by CCC and WPA.

=== Missouri ===
==== Arrow Rock State Historic Site ====
- Arrow Rock State Historic Site Bridge, Arrow Rock State Historic Site, southeast of Arrow Rock, Missouri (National Park Service and Works Progress Administration), NRHP-listed
- Arrow Rock State Historic Site Grave Shelter, Arrow Rock State Historic Site, southeast of Arrow Rock, Missouri (National Park Service and Works Progress Administration), NRHP-listed
- Arrow Rock State Historic Site Lookout Shelter, Arrow Rock State Historic Site, east of Arrow Rock, Missouri (National Park Service and Works Progress Administration), NRHP-listed
- Arrow Rock State Historic Site Open Shelter, Arrow Rock State Historic Site, southeast of Arrow Rock, Missouri (National Park Service and Works Progress Administration), NRHP-listed

==== Lake of the Ozarks State Park ====
- Camp Pin Oak Historic District, Lake of the Ozarks State Park, northeast of Camdenton, Missouri (National Park Service and Civilian Conservation Corps), NRHP-listed
- Lake of the Ozarks Recreational Demonstration Area Barn/Garage in Kaiser Area, Lake of the Ozarks State Park, northeast of Camdenton, Missouri in State Park (National Park Service and Civilian Conservation Corps), NRHP-listed
- Lake of the Ozarks Recreational Demonstration Area Rising Sun Shelter, northeast of Camdenton, Missouri in State Park (National Park Service and Civilian Conservation Corps), NRHP-listed
- Lake of the Ozarks Recreational Demonstration Area Shelter at McCubbin Point, northeast of Camdenton, Missouri in State Park (National Park Service and Civilian Conservation Corps), NRHP-listed
- Lake of the Ozarks State Park Camp Clover Point Recreation Hall, northeast of Camdenton, Missouri in State Park (National Park Service and Civilian Conservation Corps), NRHP-listed
- Lake of the Ozarks State Park Camp Rising Sun Recreation Hall, northeast of Camdenton, Missouri in State Park (National Park Service and Civilian Conservation Corps), NRHP-listed

==== Knob Noster State Park ====
- Montserrat Recreation Demonstration Area Bridge, Missouri Route 132, Knob Noster, Missouri (National Park Service and Works Progress Administration), NRHP-listed
- Montserrat Recreation Demonstration Area Dam and Spillway, southwest of Knob Noster, Missouri (National Park Service and Works Progress Administration), NRHP-listed
- Montserrat Recreation Demonstration Area Entrance Portal, off Missouri Route 132, Knob Noster, Missouri (National Park Service and Works Progress Administration), NRHP-listed
- Montserrat Recreational Demonstration Area Rock Bath House, southwest of Knob Noster, Missouri (National Park Service and Works Progress Administration), NRHP-listed
- Montserrat Recreational Demonstration Area Warehouse No. 2 and Workshop, off Missouri Route 132, Knob Noster, Missouri (National Park Service and Works Progress Administration), NRHP-listed

==== Meramec State Park ====
- Meramec State Park Beach Area Historic District, Missouri Route 185 at the Meramec River, Sullivan, Missouri (National Park Service and Civilian Conservation Corps)
- Meramec State Park Lookout House/Observation Tower, off Missouri Route 185, east of Sullivan, Missouri (National Park Service and Civilian Conservation Corps), NRHP-listed
- Meramec State Park Pump House, off Missouri Route 185, east of Sullivan, Missouri (National Park Service and Civilian Conservation Corps), NRHP-listed
- Meramec State Park Shelter House, off Missouri Route 185, east of Sullivan, Missouri (National Park Service and Civilian Conservation Corps), NRHP-listed

==== Montauk State Park ====
- Dam and Spillway in the Hatchery Area at Montauk State Park, off Missouri Route 119, Montauk State Park, Salem, Missouri (National Park Service and Civilian Conservation Corps), NRHP-listed
- Montauk State Park Open Shelter, off Missouri Route 119, Montauk State Park, Salem, Missouri (National Park Service and Civilian Conservation Corps), NRHP-listed

==== Roaring River State Park ====
- Roaring River State Park Bath House, off Park Rd., Roaring River State Park, Cassville, Missouri (National Park Service and Civilian Conservation Corps), NRHP-listed
- Roaring River State Park Dam/Spillway, off Park Rd., Cassville, Missouri (National Park Service and Civilian Conservation Corps), NRHP-listed
- Roaring River State Park Deer Leap Trail, off Park Rd., Cassville, Missouri (National Park Service and Civilian Conservation Corps), NRHP-listed
- Roaring River State Park Hotel, off Park Rd., Cassville, Missouri (National Park Service and Civilian Conservation Corps), NRHP-listed
- Roaring River State Park Shelter Kitchen No. 2 and Rest Room, off Park Rd., Cassville, Missouri (National Park Service and Civilian Conservation Corps), NRHP-listed

==== Van Meter State Park ====
- Van Meter State Park Combination Building, Van Meter State Park, Marshall, Missouri (National Park Service and Civilian Conservation Corps), NRHP-listed
- Van Meter State Park Shelter Building, Van Meter State Park, Marshall, Missouri (National Park Service and Civilian Conservation Corps), NRHP-listed

==== Other ====
- Bennett Spring State Park Shelter House and Water Gauge Station, off Missouri Route A64, Bennett Springs, Missouri (National Park Service and Civilian Conservation Corps), NRHP-listed
- Crowder State Park Vehicle Bridge, Missouri Route 128, Trenton, Missouri (National Park Service and Civilian Conservation Corps), NRHP-listed
- Mark Twain State Park Picnic Shelter at Buzzard's Roost, off Missouri Route 107, Santa Fe, Missouri (National Park Service and Civilian Conservation Corps), NRHP-listed
- Sugar Lake State Park Open Shelter, off Missouri Route 138, Rushville, Missouri (National Park Service and Civilian Conservation Corps), NRHP-listed

=== Montana and Wyoming ===
==== Devils Tower National Monument ====
- Entrance Road-Devils Tower National Monument, Devils Tower National Monument, Devils Tower, Wyoming (NPS Branch of Plans and Design), NRHP-listed
- Entrance Station (Devils Tower National Monument), Devils Tower National Monument, Wyoming (based on 1933 plans created by the National Park Service Landscape Division for a now-vanished caretaker's cabin at Aspenglen Campground in Rocky Mountain National Park, adapted by NPS architect Howard W. Baker of the Branch of Plans and Design)
- Old Headquarters Area Historic District, Devils Tower National Monument, Wyoming (Custodian's Residence by Thomas Chalmers Vint, Old Administration Building designed by Edward A. Nickel of NPS Branch of Plans and Design

==== Glacier National Park ====
- Bowman Lake Road, Glacier National Park, North Fork drainage, between Polebridge and Bowman ranger stations, West Glacier, Montana (National Park Service, Branch of Plan), NRHP-listed
- Cattle Queen Snowshoe Cabin, McDonald Subdistrict, West Glacier, Montana (National Park Service), NRHP-listed
- Coal Creek Patrol Cabin, U.S. Route 2, West Glacier, Montana (National Park Service), NRHP-listed
- Cut Bank Ranger Station Historic District, north side Cut Bank Creek, East Glacier, Montana (National Park Service), NRHP-listed
- Glacier National Park Tourist Trails--Inside Trail, South Circle, North Circle, Inside Trail, South Circle and North Circle Trails, St. Mary, Montana (NPS Landscape Division), NRHP-listed
- Going-to-the-Sun Road, Glacier Rt. 1, West Glacier, Montana (National Park Service), NRHP-listed
- Gunsight Pass Shelter, junction of Gunsight Pass Trail and the Continental Divide, West Glacier, Montana (NPS Landscape Division), NRHP-listed
- Headquarters Historic District, east of Glacier Rt. 1 at crossing of Middle Fork of the Flathead River, West Glacier, Montana (NPS Landscape Division), NRHP-listed
- Kootenai Creek Snowshoe Cabin, Flattop Mountain, along Kootenai Creek, St. Mary, Montana (National Park Service), NRHP-listed
- Lake McDonald Lodge Historic District, north of West Glacier, Montana (Lewis, John, NPS et al.), NRHP-listed
- Lee Creek Snowshoe Cabin, northeast corner of Glacier National Park, (National Park Service), NRHP-listed
- Lincoln Creek Snowshoe Cabin, U.S. Route 2, West Glacier, Montana (National Park Service), NRHP-listed
- Logging Creek Ranger Station Historic District, Glacier Rt. 7 near Logging Creek, West Glacier, Montana (NPS), NRHP-listed
- North Fork Road, Glacier National Park, North Fork drainage, Fish Creek to Kintla Lake, West Glacier, Montana (NPS Landscape Division), NRHP-listed
- Many Glacier Barn and Bunkhouse, Glacier Rt. 3 at Apikuni Flat, St. Mary, Montana (National Park Service), NRHP-listed
- Many Glacier Campground Camptender's Cabin, Many Glacier, St. Mary, Montana (National Park Service), NRHP-listed
- Polebridge to Numa Ridge Phoneline, North Fork drainage, Polebridge to Numa Ridge, West Glacier, Montana (National Park Service), NRHP-listed
- Roes Creek Campground Camptender's Cabin, north of Going-to-the-Sun Rd. at St. Mary Lake, St. Mary, Montana (National Park Service, Branch of Plan), NRHP-listed
- St. Mary Utility Area Historic District, east of St. Mary, Montana at Divide Creek (National Park Service), NRHP-listed
- Sun Camp Fireguard Cabin, Going-to-the-Sun Rd., St. Mary, Montana (National Park Service), NRHP-listed
- Swiftcurrent Auto Camp Historic District, west end of Glacier Rt. 3, Many Glacier, Montana (National Park Service, Branch of Plan), NRHP-listed
- Two Medicine Campground Camptender's Cabin, Two Medicine Lake, East Glacier, Montana (National Park Service), NRHP-listed
- West Entrance Station, Going-to-the-Sun Rd., near West Glacier, Montana (National Park Service, Branch of Plan), NRHP-listed

==== Grand Teton National Park ====
- Jenny Lake CCC Camp NP-4, Grand Teton National Park, 1/4 mile south of Jenny Lake, west side of Cottonwood Creek, Moose, Wyoming (NPS), NRHP-listed
- Jenny Lake Ranger Station Historic District, Grand Teton National Park, Jenny Lake Rd., Moose, Wyoming (NPS Branch of Plans & Design), NRHP-listed
- Old Administrative Area Historic District, Grand Teton National Park, off Teton Park Rd., Moose, Wyoming (NPS Branch of Plans & Design), NRHP-listed
- Moose Entrance Kiosk, Grand Teton National Park, Park Rd., Moose, Wyoming (NPS Branch of Plans & Design), NRHP-listed
- String Lake Comfort Station, Grand Teton National Park, off Teton Park Rd. at String Lake, Moose, Wyoming (NPS Branch of Plans & Design), NRHP-listed
- White Grass Ranger Station Historic District, Grand Teton National Park, off Moose Wilson Rd., Moose, Wyoming (NPS Branch of Plans & Design), NRHP-listed

==== Yellowstone National Park ====
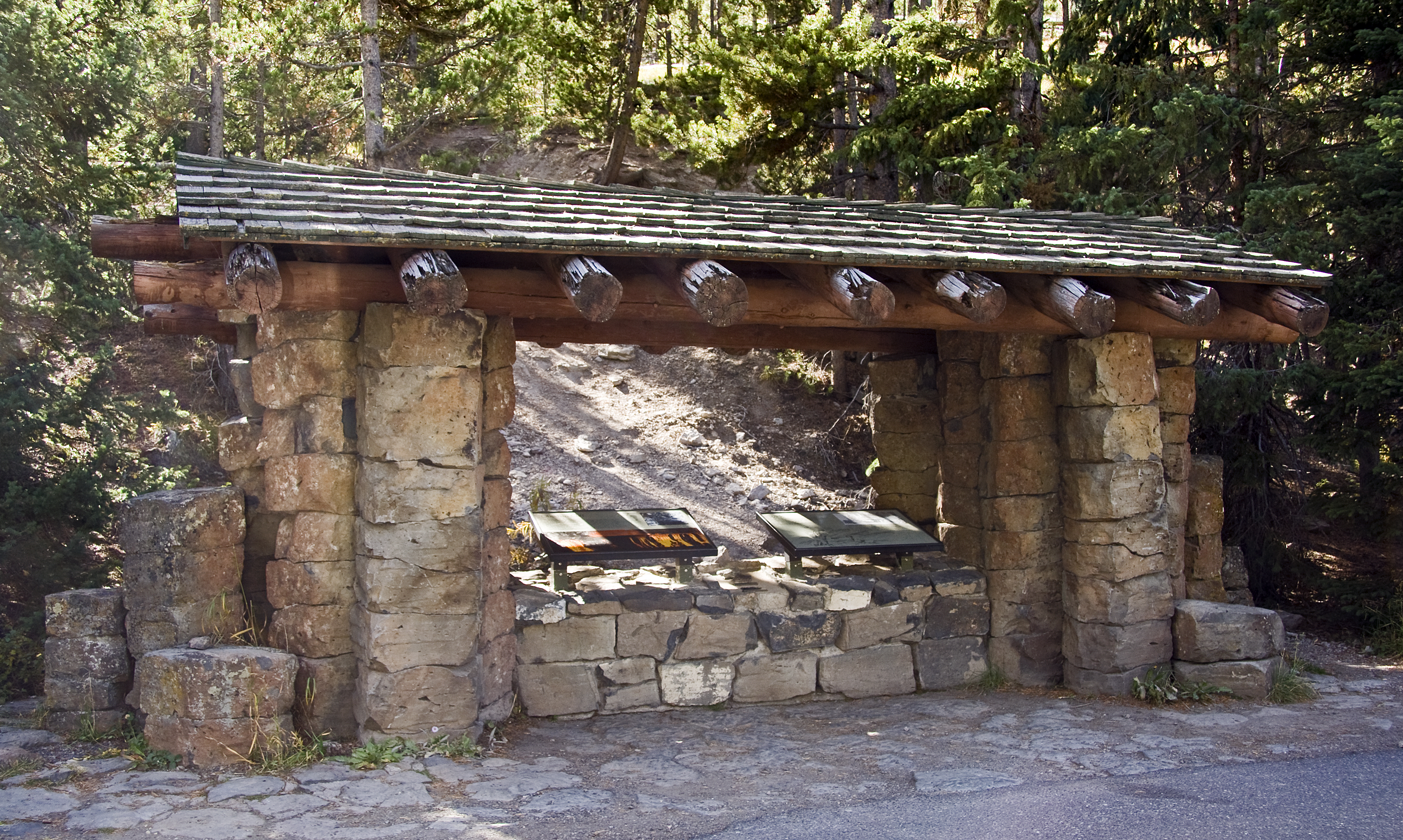
Obsidian Cliff Kiosk

- Fishing Bridge Museum (1929), Yellowstone National Park (designed by NPS architect Herbert Maier), part of the Norris, Madison, and Fishing Bridge Museums which has been designated as a National Historic Landmark
- Grand Loop Road Historic District, Grand Loop Rd. Yellowstone National Park, Wyoming (National Park Service), NRHP-listed
- Lamar Buffalo Ranch, E of Mammoth Hot Springs on Northeast Entrance Rd. Mammoth Hot Springs, Wyoming (National Park Service), NRHP-listed
- Madison Museum (1929), Yellowstone National Park (designed by NPS architect Herbert Maier), part of the Norris, Madison, and Fishing Bridge Museums which has been designated as a National Historic Landmark
- Norris Geyser Basin Museum (1929-1930), Yellowstone National Park (designed by NPS architect Herbert Maier), part of the Norris, Madison, and Fishing Bridge Museums which has been designated as a National Historic Landmark
- Northeast Entrance Station, US 212, Yellowstone National Park, Montana (NPS Branch of Plans & Design), NRHP-listed
- Obsidian Cliff Kiosk (1931), Yellowstone National Park Mammoth, Wyoming (designed by NPS park naturalist, Carl Russell), NRHP-listed

First "wayside exhibit built in the National Park System", an "open-air museum-in-miniature", and a small shelter for interpretative information, in National Park Service Rustic style.

- Old Faithful Museum of Thermal Activity (1929), Yellowstone National Park (designed by NPS architect Herbert Maier), demolished in 1971

=== Nevada ===
- Boulder Dam Park Museum (1935), now known as the Lost City Museum, Nevada State Route 169, west side, south of Overton, Nevada (built by the National Park Service and Civilian Conservation Corps to exhibit Anasazi artifacts from Pueblo Grande de Nevada, also known as Nevada's "Lost City"), NRHP-listed

=== New Mexico ===
==== Carlsbad Caverns National Park ====
- The Caverns Historic District (1940-1942), Carlsbad Caverns National Park, Carlsbad, New Mexico (several structures designed by Thomas Chalmers Vint of NPS; others by Lyle E. Bennett and other NPS personnel)
- Rattlesnake Springs Historic District, Carlsbad Caverns National Park, Carlsbad, New Mexico (1940 Ranger's Residence and the 1933 Pump House designed by William G. Carnes of the NPS; later structures designed by Ken Saunders and Del Jones at the Park Service Branch of Plans and Designs in Santa Fe)

=== Oklahoma ===
- Nichols Park (1938-1941), located on the Indian Nation Turnpike (toll road) approximately two mile south of downtown Henryetta in Okmulgee County, Oklahoma (design by Charles Krueger of the National Park Service; built by Civilian Conservation Corps), NRHP-listed

The registered properties are listed in part due to their NPS rustic architecture and include a beach house, two picnic shelter, and comfort station.

- Perry Lake Park (1934-1935), also known as CCC Park, 1520 South 4th Street, Perry, Oklahoma (National Park Service; built by Civilian Conservation Corps), NRHP-listed

The registered properties include a boat house and are listed in part as "an excellent example of the architecture and landscape design philosophy of the National Park Service."

=== Oregon ===
==== Crater Lake National Park ====
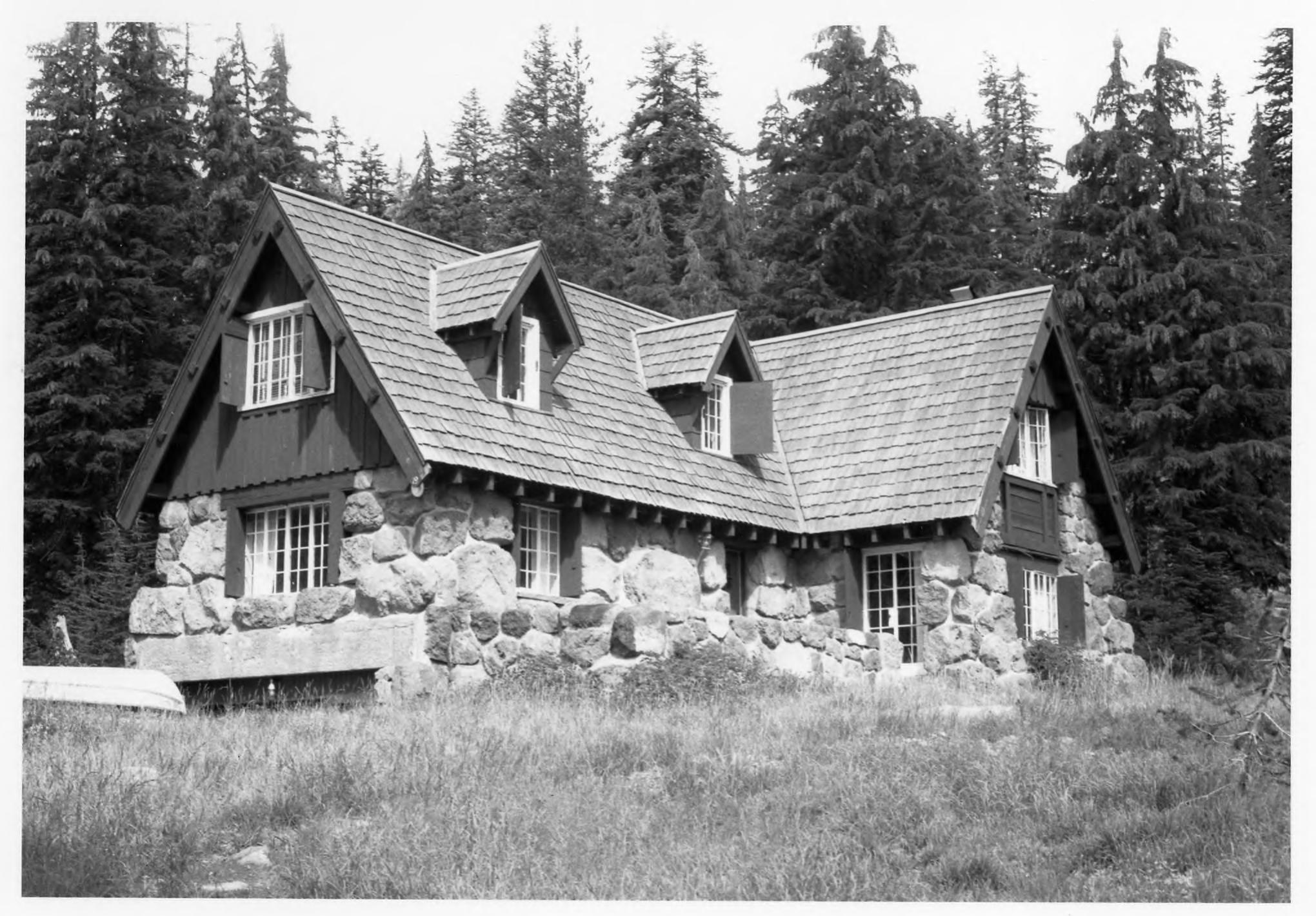
Crater Lake Superintendent's Residence

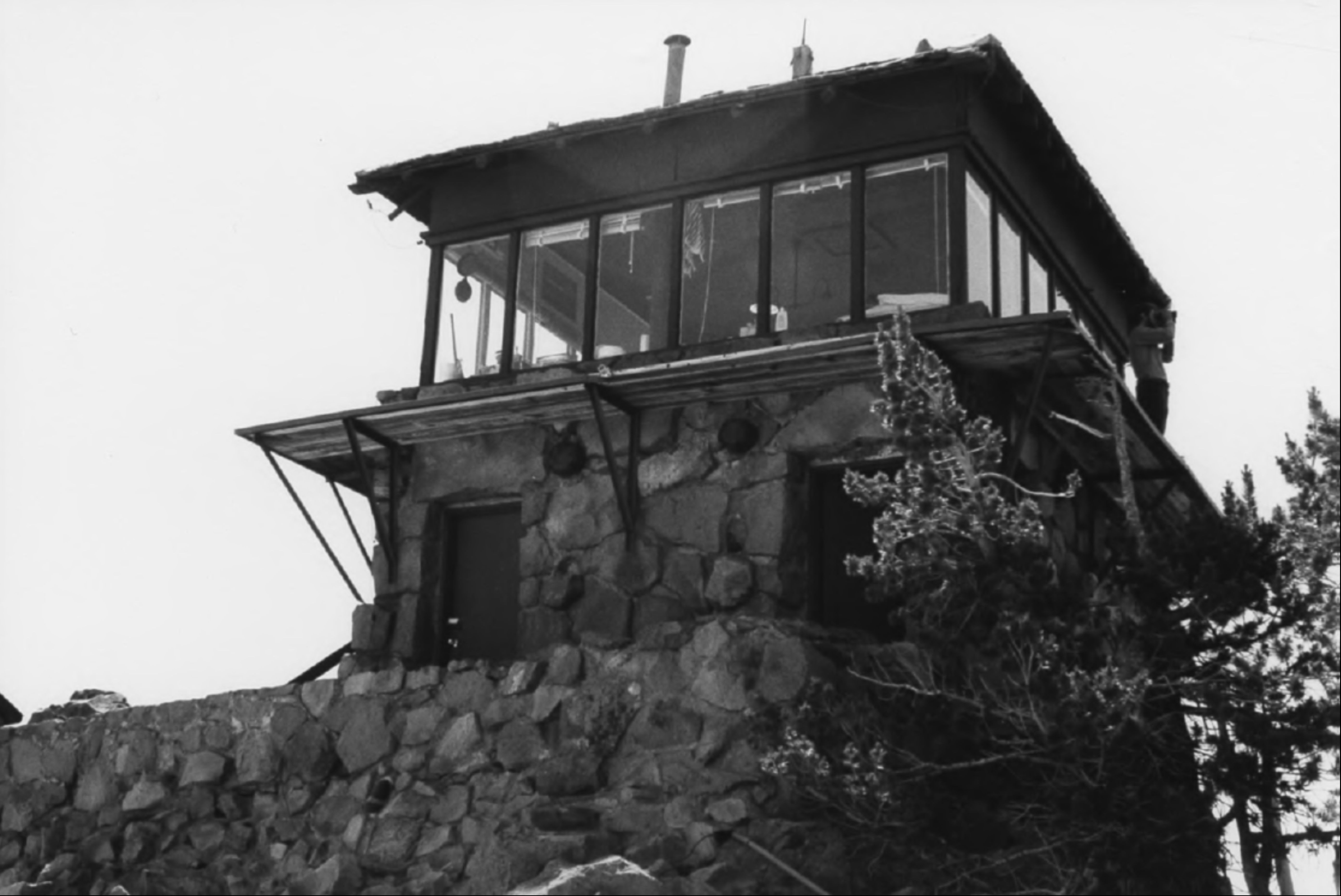
Watchman Lookout Station No. 68

- Comfort Station No. 72, Rim Dr., in Rim Village Campground, Crater Lake National Park, Fort Klamath, Oregon (National Park Service), NRHP-listed
- Crater Lake Superintendent's Residence, Munson Valley, Crater Lake National Park, Oregon (NPS Branch of Plans & Design), NRHP-listed and a National Historic Landmark.

- Munson Valley Historic District, junction of Crater Lake Highway and Rim Drive, Fort Klamath, Oregon (master plan overseen by Thomas Chalmers Vint of NPS Landscape Engineering Division), NRHP-listed
- Sinnott Memorial Building No. 67 (1931), Rim Drive, near Rim Village Campground, Fort Klamath, Oregon (Merel S. Sager of the National Park Service), NRHP-listed
- Watchman Lookout Station No. 68 (1932), off Rim Drive on Watchman Peak, Fort Klamath, Oregon (Merel S. Sager of the National Park Service), NRHP-listed

==== Other ====
- Jessie M. Honeyman Memorial State Park Historic District (1936-1941), U.S. Route 101, Florence, Oregon (built by Civilian Conservation Corps; plans by National Park Service), NRHP-listed

Listed properties include bathhouse (1938, designed by J. Elwood Isted), kitchen shelters (adapted by Glen O. Stevenson from a Plan by J. Elwood Isted for Washington State Parks), pumphouse (1937, designed by J. Elwood Isted), caretaker's house (1936, designed by Jack Peterson), caretaker's garage (1937, designed by J. Elwood Isted)

=== South Dakota ===
- Ranger Station (1935), also known as Old Administration Building, Jewel Cave National Monument, Custer County, South Dakota (NPS), NRHP-listed

=== Utah ===
==== Bryce Canyon National Park ====
- Old Administration Building, Bryce Canyon National Park (NPS), NRHP-listed
- Bryce Canyon National Park Scenic Trails Historic District, Bryce Canyon National Park (NPS), NRHP-listed
- Horse Barn, Bryce Canyon National Park (NPS), NRHP-listed
- Loop C Comfort Station, N. Campground, Bryce Canyon National Park (NPS), NRHP-listed
- Loop D Comfort Station, N. Campground, Bryce Canyon National Park (NPS), NRHP-listed
- National Park Service Housing, Old, Historic District, Bryce Canyon National Park (NPS), NRHP-listed
- Rainbow Point Comfort Station and Overlook Shelter, Bryce Canyon National Park (NPS), NRHP-listed
- Riggs Spring Fire Trail, Bryce Canyon National Park (NPS), NRHP-listed
- Under-the-Rim Trail, Bryce Canyon National Park (NPS), NRHP-listed

==== Zion National Park ====
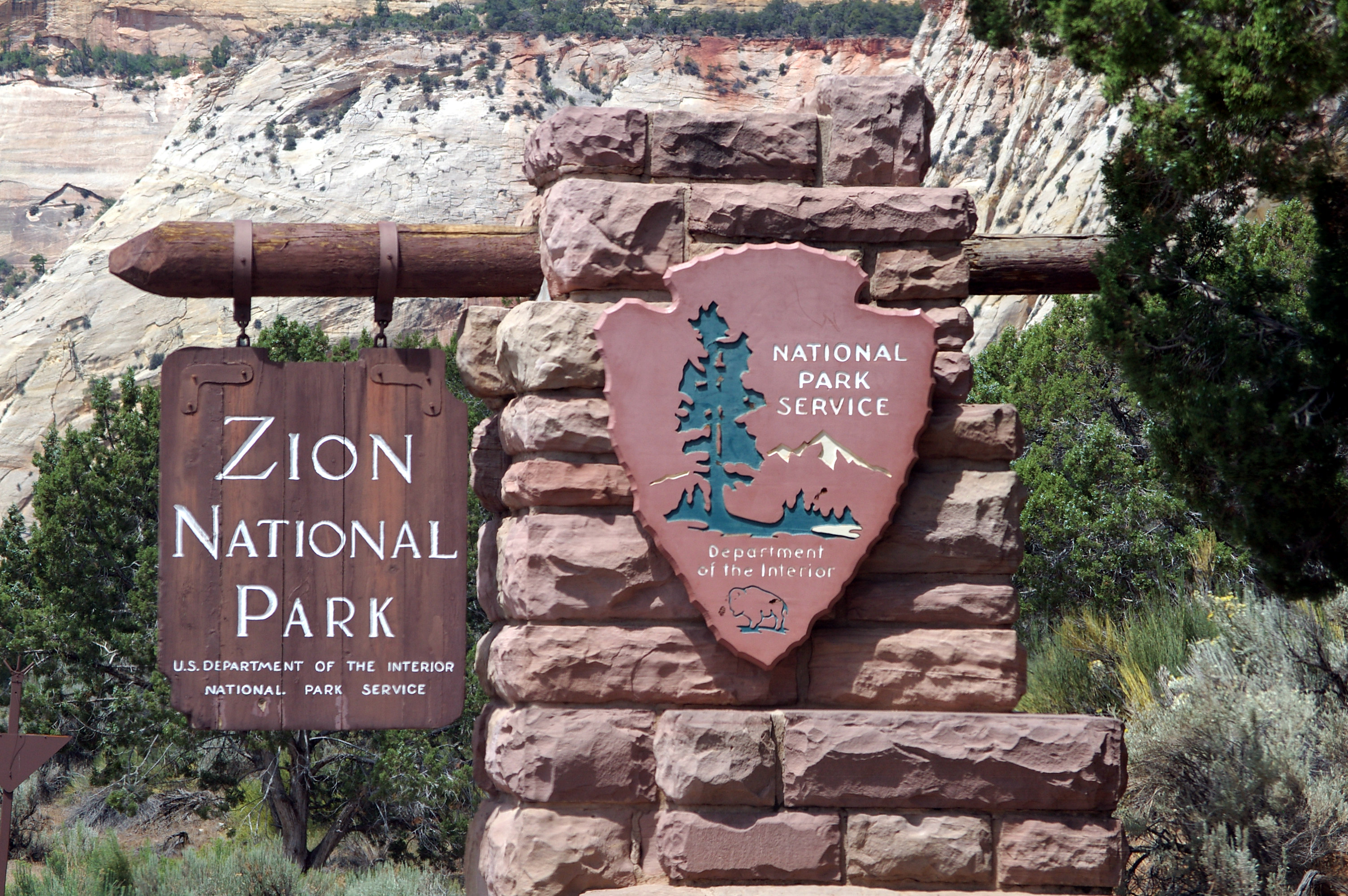
East Entrance Sign

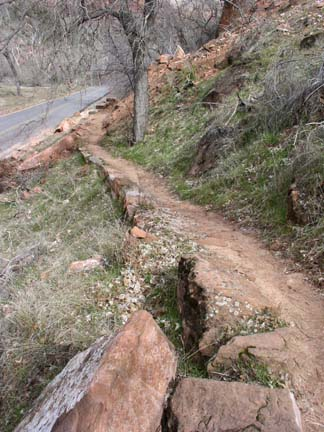
Grotto Trail

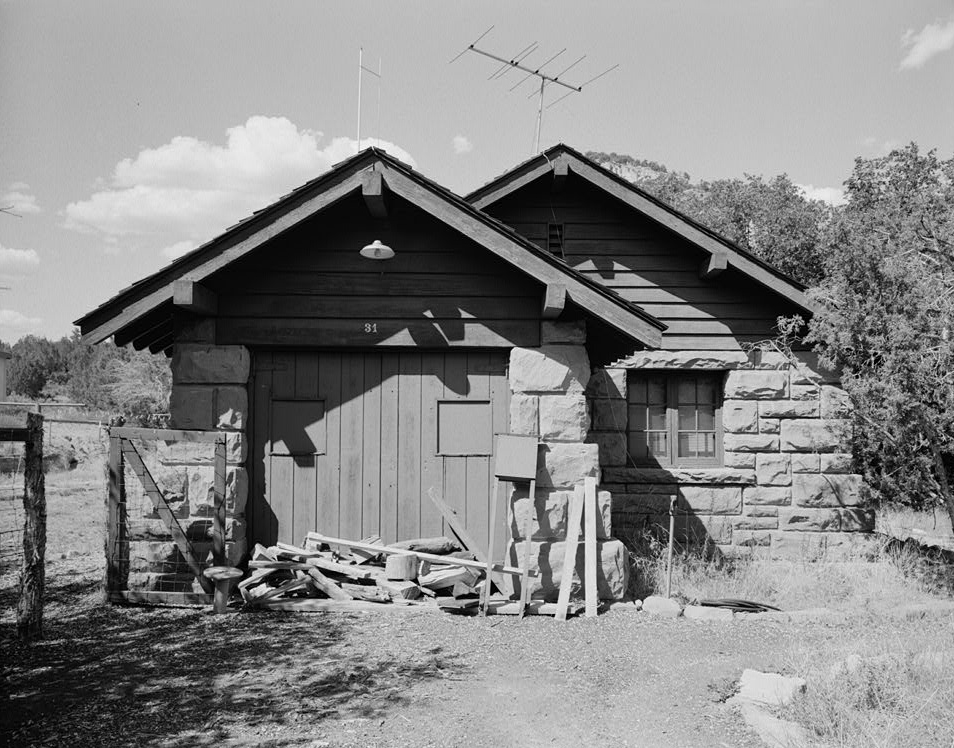
East Entrance Residence

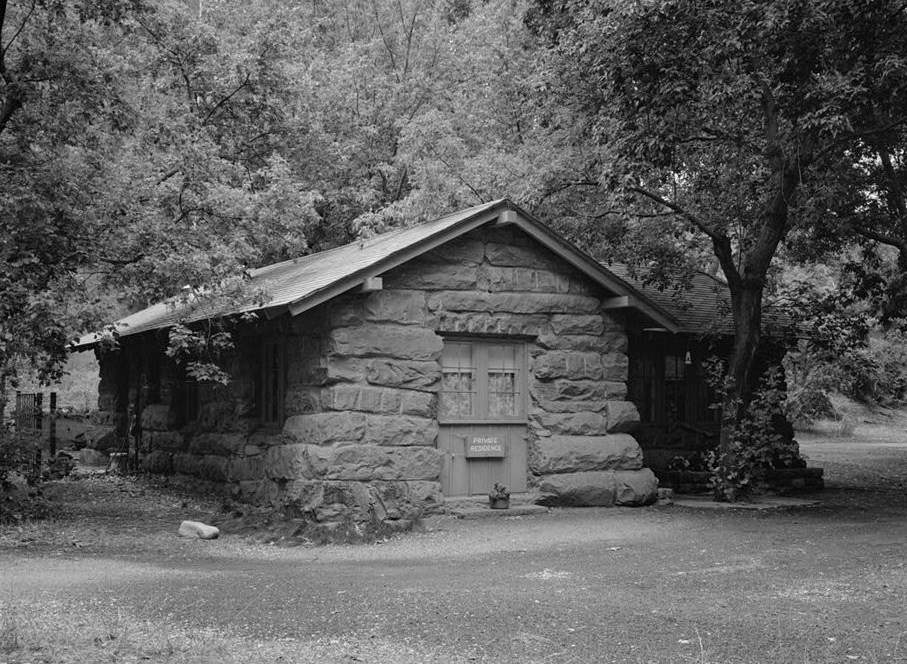
Museum-Grotto Residence

- Angels Landing Trail-West Rim Trail (1926), Angels Landing, Zion National Park (planned by Thomas Chalmers Vint of the NPS Branch of Plans and Design and Walter Ruesch, Zion Park building foreman), NRHP-listed
- The Cable Creek Bridge (1932), on the Floor of the Valley Road, Zion National Park (designed by NPS Western Office of Design and Construction), NRHP-listed
- East and South Entrance Signs (1936), Zion National Park (designed by NPS Branch of Plans and Designs; altered in 1950 to design of NPS architects H.W. Young and A.C. Kuehl), NRHP-listed
- East Entrance Checking Station (1935), East Entrance, Zion National Park (designed by NPS Branch of Plans and Design), NRHP-listed
- East Entrance Residence, East Entrance 150 ft. north of Utah Route 9, Springdale, Utah (designed by NPS's Branch of Plans and Design; built by CCC), NRHP-listed
- Floor of the Valley Road, Zion National Park (built in 1916, later redesigned by NPS Branch of Plans and Designs to highlight the natural features of the valley while presenting a natural-appearing built environment), NRHP-listed
- Gateway to the Narrows Trail (1928), one-mile trail along the Virgin River, Zion National Park, Utah (designed by NPS engineer Guy D. Edwards), NRHP-listed
- Grotto Camping Ground Comfort Stations (1925), Grotto Picnic Area near Grotto Residence, east of Scenic Dr., Springdale, Utah (designed by NPS architect Harry Langley), NRHP-listed
- Grotto Trail (1932), begins at Zion Lodge, running along the floor of the valley to the Zion Museum at what is now the Grotto Picnic Area (designed by NPS landscape architect Harry Langley), NRHP-listed
- Museum-Grotto Residence, southeast of Grotto Picnic Area, Springdale, Utah (designed by Harry Langley of NPS Branch of Plans and Designs), NRHP-listed
- Oak Creek Historic District, off State Route 9 along bank of Oak Creek, Springdale, Utah (NPS), NRHP-listed
- Pine Creek Historic District (1929-1930), Zion National Park (designed by Thomas Chalmers Vint), NRHP-listed
- South Campground Comfort Station (1934), South Campground at north end of campsite loop, Springdale, Utah (designed by W. G. Carnes of the NPS Western Division of Plans and Design), NRHP-listed

=== Washington ===
==== Mount Rainier National Park ====
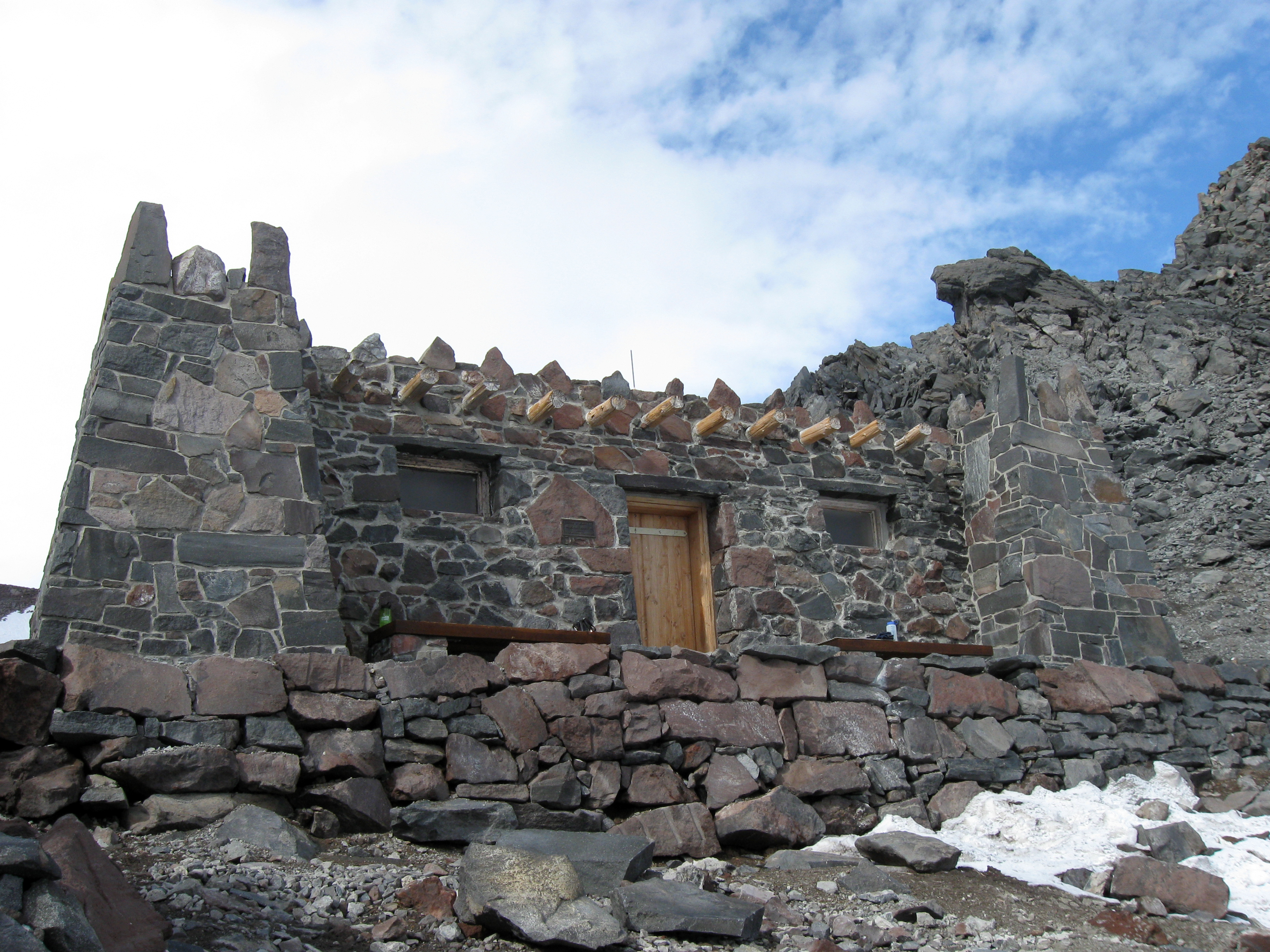
Shelter at Camp Muir

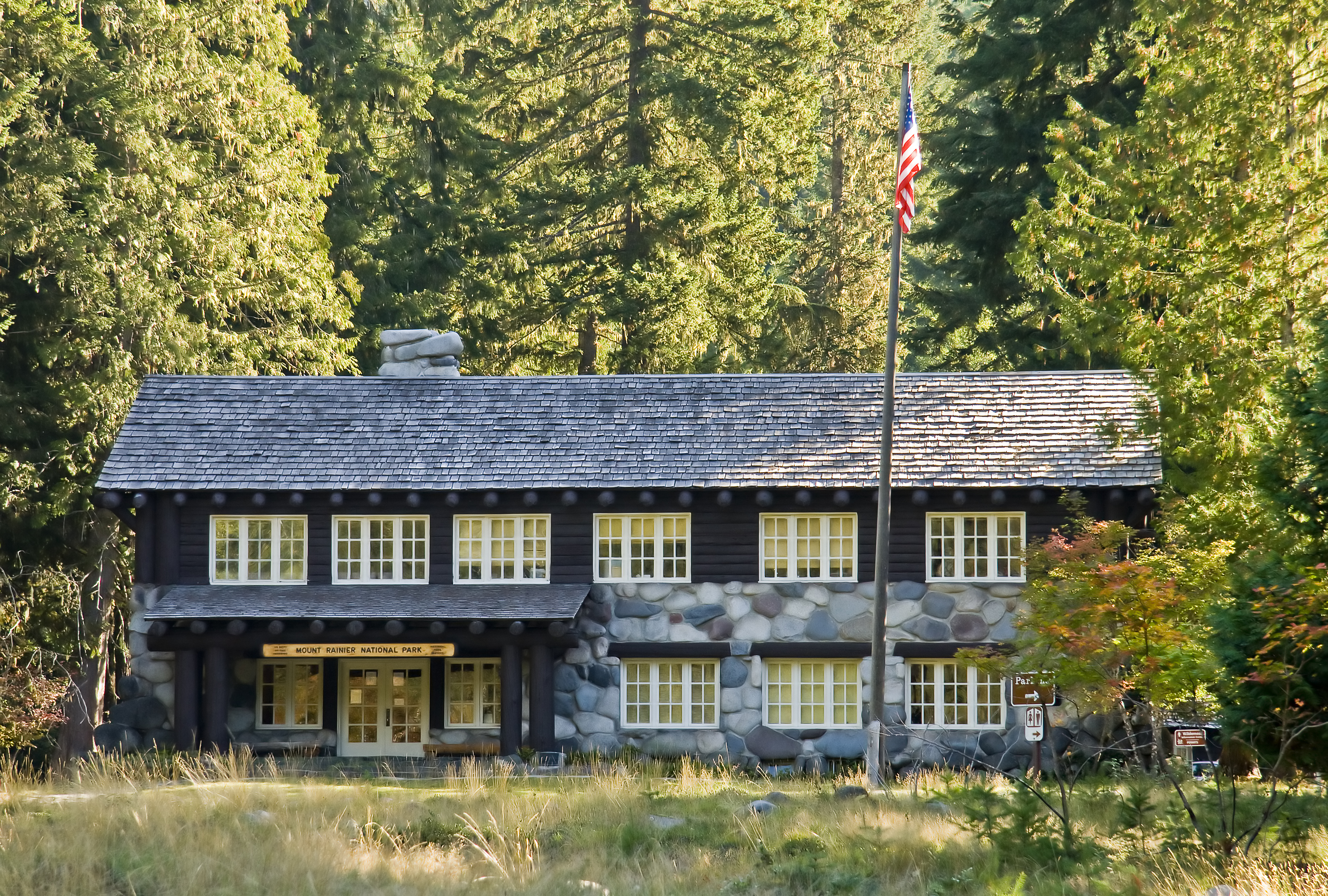
Longmire Headquarters

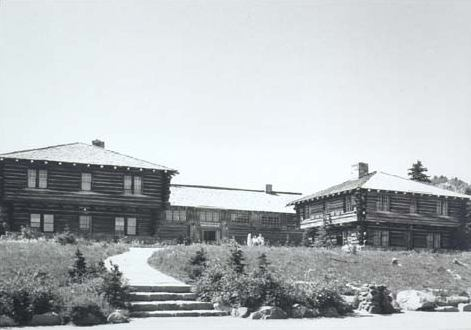
Yakima Park Stockade Group

- Camp Muir, Mount Rainier National Park, Paradise, Washington (plans supervised by Daniel Ray Hull of NPS)
- Chinook Pass Entrance Arch (1933), Chinook Pass Entrance to Mount Rainier National Park (NPS Branch of Plans and Designs), NRHP-listed
- Christine Falls Bridge (1927-1928), Paradise Road over Van Trump Creek, Paradise, Washington (architectural plans by National Park Service Branch of Plans and Design, San Francisco)
- Gobbler's Knob Fire Lookout (1933), Nisqually Entrance, Mount Rainier National Park (designed by NPS Branch of Plans and Designs under supervision of Acting Chief Architect Edwin A. Nickel), NRHP-listed
- Huckleberry Creek Patrol Cabin (1934), Mount Rainier National Park (NPS Acting Chief Architect W. G. Carnes designed the "1930s standard patrol cabin plan"), NRHP-listed.
- Indian Bar Trail Shelter (1940), Mount Rainier National Park, Paradise, Washington (designed by NPS Branch of Plans and Design under supervision of Edwin A. Nickel), NRHP-listed
- Ipsut Creek Patrol Cabin (1933), Mount Rainier National Park, Carbon River Entrance (one of several patrol cabins in the park built using plans by the NPS Branch of Plans and Design under supervision of Acting Chief Architect W. G. Carnes), NRHP-listed
- Longmire Buildings (1927-1929), Longmire, Mount Rainier National Park (designed by National Park Service staff, including Ernest A. Davidson, under direction of Thomas Chalmers Vint)
- Longmire Campground Comfort Stations (1930), Mount Rainier National Park, Longmire, Washington (designed by NPS Branch of Plans and Designs; construction supervised by park landscape architect Ernest A. Davidson, NRHP-listed
- Mt. Fremont Fire Lookout(1934), Mount Rainier National Park, vicinity of Sunrise, Washington (built to standard plan developed by NPS Western Division, Branch of Plans and Design, with Edward A. Nickel), NRHP-listed
- Narada Falls Comfort Station (1942), Mount Rainier National Park (designed by NPS Western Region Landscape Engineering Division, with plan approval by Thomas Chalmers Vint), NRHP-listed
- Summerland Trail Shelter (1934), Mount Rainier National Park, Sunrise, Washington (designed by NPS Branch of Plans and Design under supervision of Edwin A. Nickel), NRHP-listed
- Sunrise Comfort Station (1932), Mount Rainier National Park, Sunrise, Washington (designed by Thomas Chalmers Vint in association with Ernest A. Davidson), NRHP-listed
- Shriner Peak Fire Lookout (1932), Mount Rainier National Park, Ohanapecosh, Washington (built to standard design developed by NPS, Landscape Division, Branch of Plans and Design, NRHP-listed
- Tahoma Vista Comfort Station (1931), Mount Rainier National Park (designed by NPS, Western Region, Branch of Plans and Design with Thomas Chalmers Vint; NPS landscape architect Ernest A. Davidson "extensively involved in supervising construction of the scenic overlook"), NRHP-listed
- Three Lakes Patrol Cabin (1934), Mount Rainier National Park (built to a standard plan designed by W.G. Carnes, NPS Acting Chief Architect, Branch of Plans and Designs, supervised by Thomas Chalmers Vint), NRHP-listed
- Tipsoo Lake Comfort Station (1934), Mount Rainier National Park (NPS Branch of Design and Plans under supervision of Thomas Chalmers Vint)
- Tolmie Peak Fire Lookout (1933), Mount Rainier National Park, Mowich Lake Entrance (design was prepared under the supervision of Edwin A. Nickel of the NPS Branch of Plans and Designs), NRHP-listed
- White River Mess Hall and Dormitory (1934), Mount Rainier National Park, White River Entrance (designed by NPS Branch of Plans and Design under supervision of Thomas Chalmers Vint), NRHP-listed
- Yakima Park Stockade Group (1930), Mount Rainier National Park (Ernest A. Davidson, landscape architect, and A. Paul Brown, architect, of the NPS Landscape Engineering Division), NRHP-listed and National Historic Landmark

==== Olympic National Park ====
- Canyon Creek Shelter (1939), also known as Sol Duc Falls Shelter, approximately .9 miles north of the Upper Sol Duc River Trailhead, Olympic National Park (built by Civilian Conservation Corps under guidance of National Park Service), NRHP-listed
- Graves Creek Ranger Station (1939-1941), approximately 22 miles northeast of Route 101 on Quinault River Road, Quinault District of Olympic National Park (National Park Service with assistance of Public Works Administration and Civilian Conservation Corps labor), NRHP-listed
- Olympic National Park Headquarters Historic District (1940-1941), 600 East Park Ave., Port Angeles, Washington (National Park Service with assistance of Public Works Administration and Civilian Conservation Corps labor), NRHP-listed

== See also ==
- Architects of the United States Forest Service
- History of the National Park Service
- National Park Service rustic
