= North Rim Road, Black Canyon of the Gunnison National Park =

- U.S. National Register of Historic Places
- U.S. Historic district
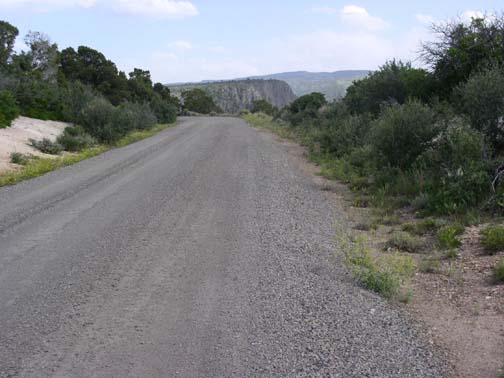
- North Rim Road at Black Canyon of the Gunnison National Park, Colorado, USA

- Location within Colorado Location within the United States
- Nearest city: Crawford, Colorado
- Area: 231 acres (0.93 km^{2})
- Built: 1933
- Built by: Civilian Conservation Corps
- Architect: NPS-Engineering Branch
- NRHP reference No.: 05001181
- Added to NRHP: September 6, 2005

The North Rim Road, Black Canyon of the Gunnison National Park, near Crawford, Colorado was built during 1933–38. It is an approximately five mile long roadway, with viewpoints and associated structures. It is recognized as a "designed landscape". It includes five overlooks over the Black Canyon of the Gunnison.

== Construction ==
Designed by the National Park Service's NPS-Engineering Branch, the road would be built by the Civilian Conservation Corps Designers included T.W. Secrest, who received input from NPS landscape architects including Thomas Chalmers Vint, Howard M. Baker, and Charles A. Richey.

== Listing ==
It was listed as a historic district on the National Register of Historic Places in 2005; the listing also termed it the North Rim Road Historic District. The district includes five contributing buildings, six contributing sites and 11 other contributing structures.
