= Grand Canyon South Rim Ranger's Dormitory =

- Ranger's Dormitory
- U.S. National Register of Historic Places
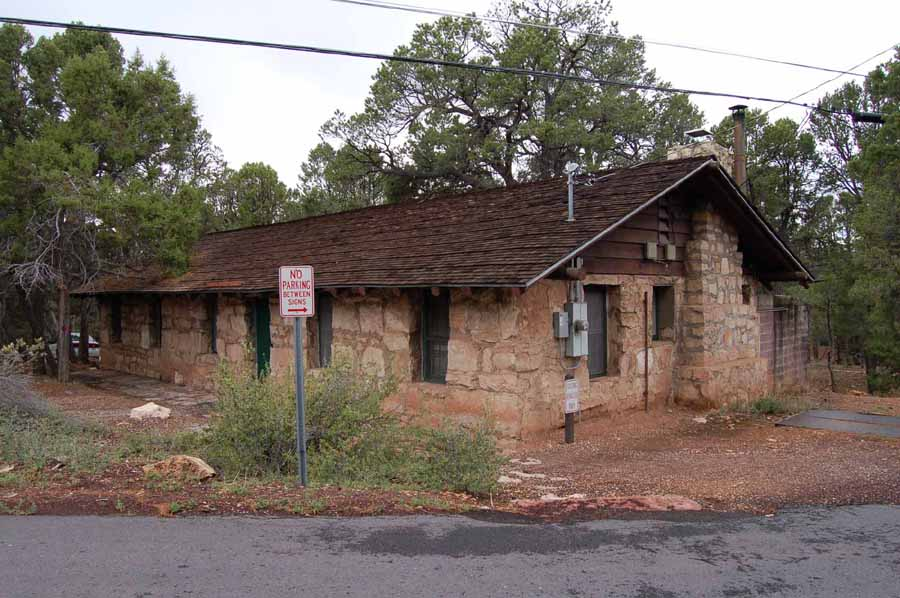

- Location within Arizona Location within the United States
- Location: Off AZ 64 in Grand Canyon National Park, Grand Canyon, Arizona
- Coordinates: 36°3′20″N 112°8′11″W
- Built: 1921
- NRHP reference No.: 75000219
- Added to NRHP: September 5, 1975

The Ranger's Dormitory at the South Rim of Grand Canyon National Park was built in 1920–21. Originally built as a worker's dormitory, it was converted for use by rangers in 1927. The stone building was designed by Daniel Ray Hull of the National Park Service Branch of Plans and Designs, and is a precursor of the later National Park Service Rustic style.

The dormitory is one of the earliest National Park Service-built structures at the South Rim. Measuring about 55 feet (17 m) by 25 feet (7.6 m), the single-story structure's exterior walls are constructed of rubble sandstone with a long gabled roof. The gable ends are sheathed in wood. The ground falls away from front to back, so that the back door has a stone stairway. The interior features an entrance hall and a large communal room with a stone fireplace at the western end, with a central hall running down the center to the rear door with individual rooms on either side.

The dormitory was placed on the National Register of Historic Places on September 5, 1975. It is included in the Grand Canyon Village National Historic Landmark District.

== See also ==
- Architects of the National Park Service
