= Pear Lake Ski Hut =

- U.S. National Register of Historic Places
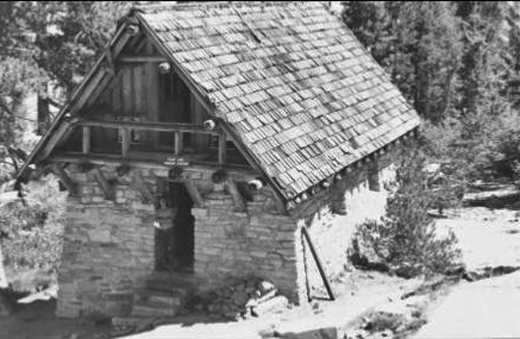

- Location within California Location within the United States
- Nearest city: Lodgepole
- Coordinates: 36°36′29″N 118°40′15″W
- Built: 1939
- Architect: National Park Service
- Architectural style: National Park Service Rustic
- NRHP reference No.: 78000285
- Added to NRHP: May 05, 1978

The Pear Lake Ski Hut (also known as Pear Lake Winter Hut) is a mountain hut in Sequoia National Park, California, listed on the National Register of Historic Places. Built in Sequoia National Park by the Civilian Conservation Corps from 1939–41 using local Sierra granite and timber materials, the hut is an example of the National Park Service Rustic style, using rough masonry and a log roof structure.

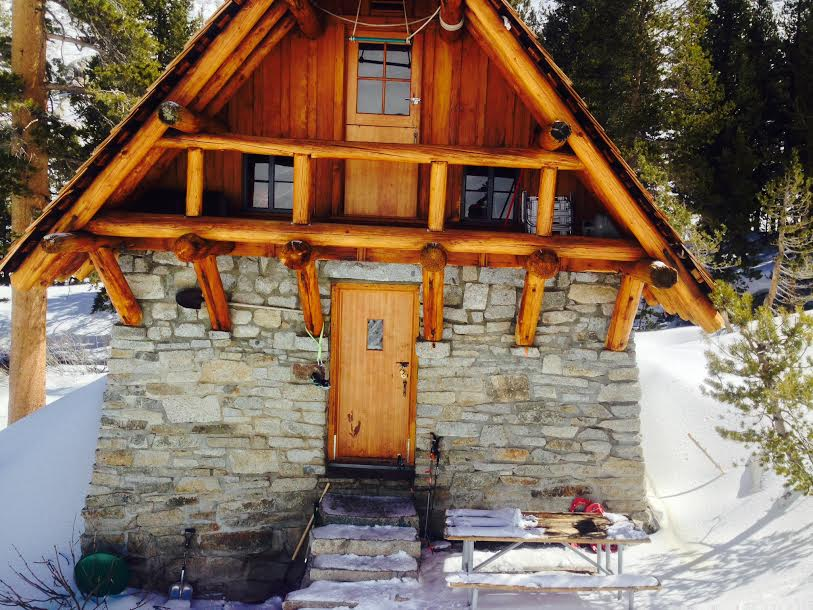
Pear Lake Hut

Pear Lake Hut is located in the high Sierra east of Lodgepole, and 0.375 miles (0.604 km) north of Pear Lake at 9,200 feet (2,800 meters) and is reached by ascending a steep six miles (9.7 km) of trail from Wolverton Meadow (7,200 feet [2,200 meters]). It has been said to be "one of the most environmentally successful alpine structures ever designed by the NPS".

The Pear Lake Ski Hut is open to the public in the winter between December and April and advanced reservations are required. The hut sleeps up to ten guests, has a separate quarters upstairs for a hut keeper and is heated by a wood pellet stove. In addition to serving as a wintertime ski hut, the structure serves as a Ranger Station for the busy Pear Lake Basin during summer months.
