= Shadow Mountain Trail =

- U.S. National Register of Historic Places
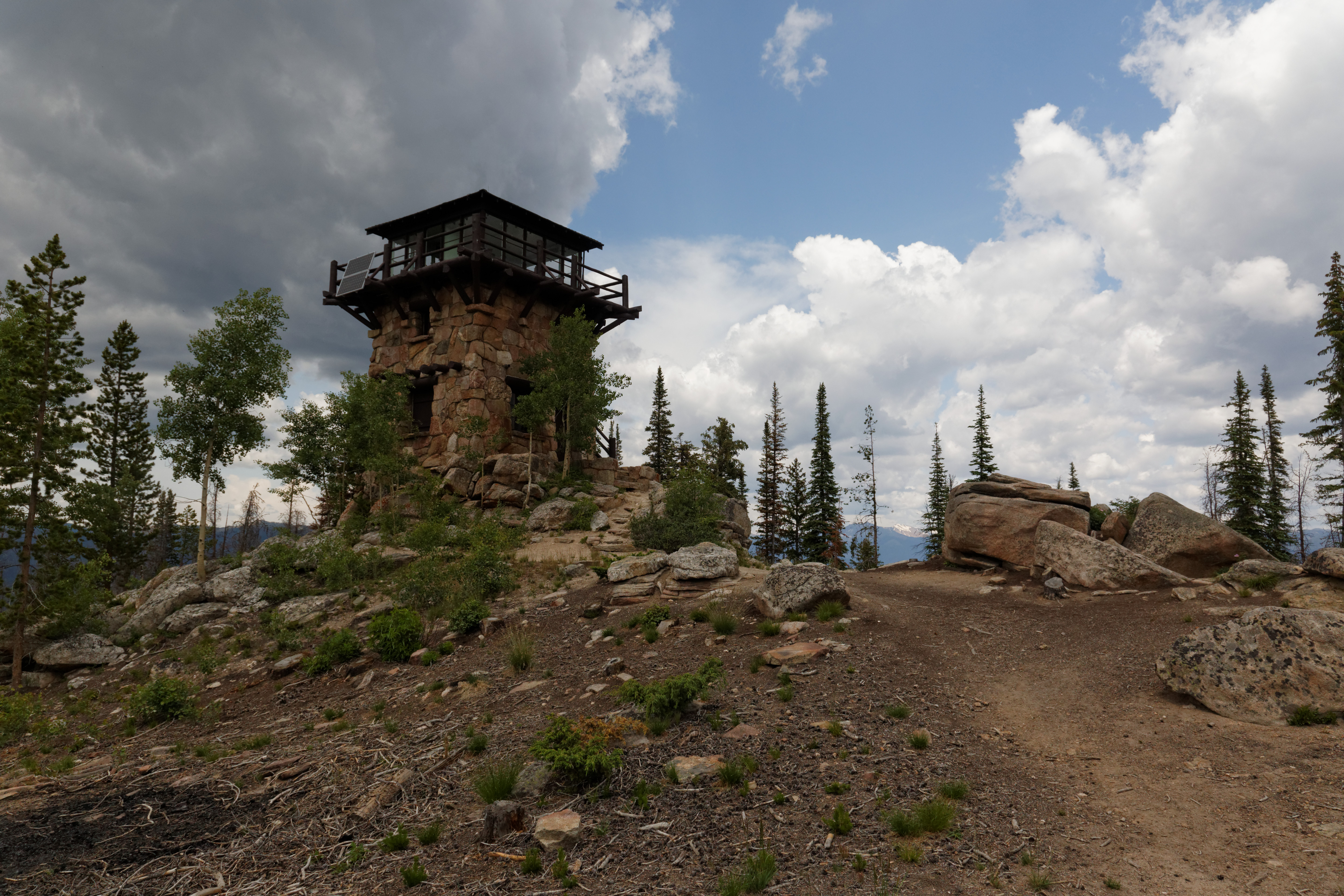

- Location within Colorado Location within the United States
- Nearest city: Grand Lake, Colorado
- Area: 8 acres (3.2 ha)
- Built: 1930; 96 years ago
- Architect: National Park Service
- Architectural style: Late 19th and Early 20th Century American Movements, Rustic
- MPS: Rocky Mountain National Park MPS
- NRHP reference No.: 08000124
- Added to NRHP: March 5, 2008

Shadow Mountain Trail is a trail 4.8 miles (7.7 km) long on the east side of Shadow Mountain Lake, near Grand Lake, Colorado. It is also known as, or is associated with, Echo Mountain Trail, Lookout Mountain Trail and Pine Ridge Trail. The trail was rebuilt in 1930 by the National Park Service; trail design reflects NPS Naturalistic Design of the 1920s to 1940s.

It was listed on the National Register of Historic Places in 2008. The listing included 8 acres (3.2 ha) with one contributing structure.
