= Lower Toklat River Ranger Cabin No. 18 =

- U.S. National Register of Historic Places
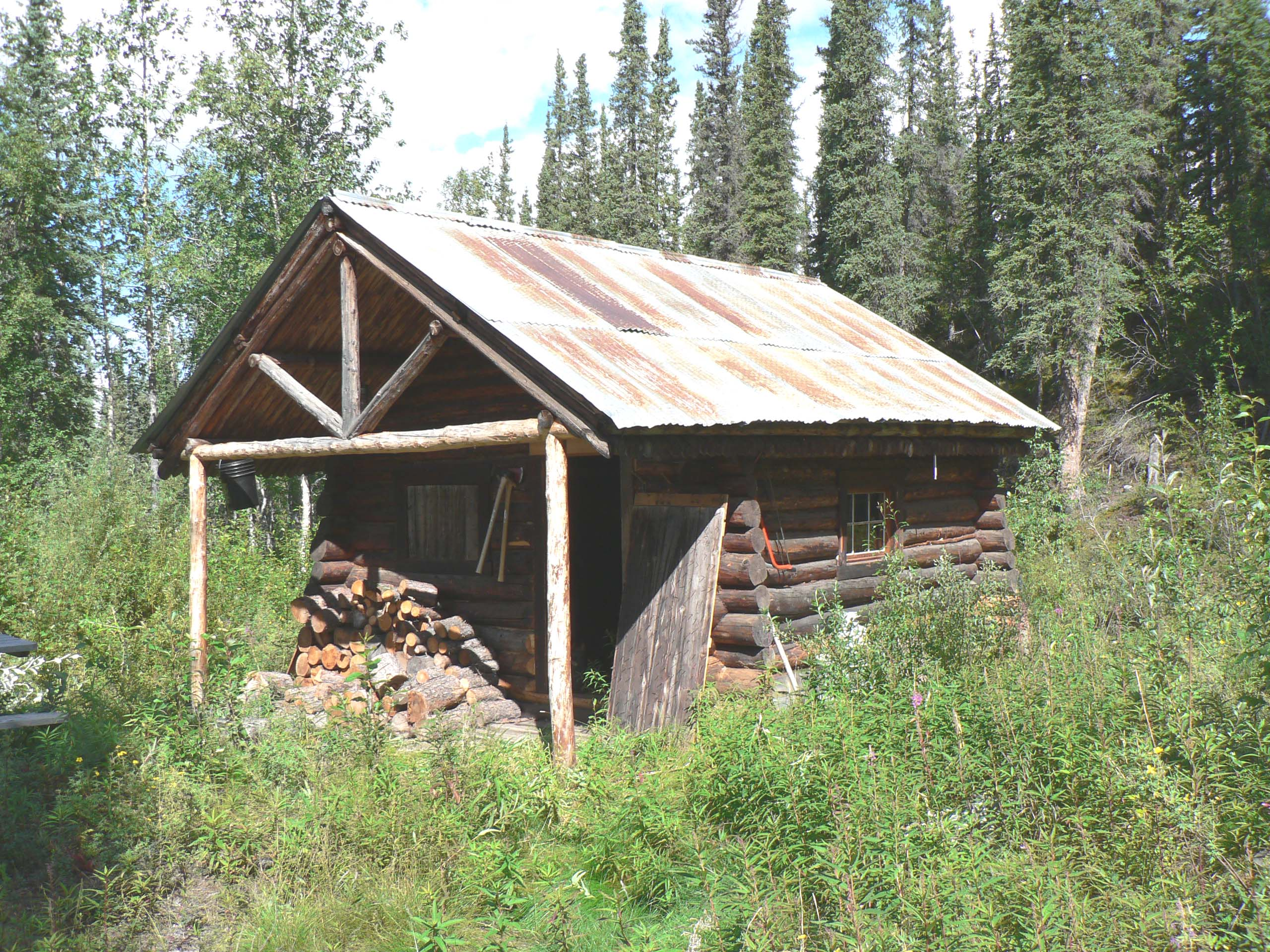
- Lower Toklat Ranger Cabin

- Location within Alaska
- Location: 30 miles (48 km) north on Toklat River from Park Road, Denali National Park and Preserve, Alaska, U.S.
- Coordinates: 63°47′46″N 150°15′10″W
- Area: less than one acre
- Built: 1931
- Built by: National Park Service
- MPS: Patrol Cabins, Mount McKinley National Park TR
- NRHP reference No.: 86003222
- Added to NRHP: November 25, 1986

The Lower Toklat Ranger Cabin No. 18, also known as the Lower Toklat Patrol Cabin, is a log shelter in the National Park Service Rustic style in Denali National Park. The cabin is part of a network of shelters used by patrolling park rangers throughout the park. It is a standard design by the National Park Service Branch of Plans and Designs and was built in 1931. The cabin has twelve separate log dog kennels, also to a standard Park Service design.

Work began in the summer of 1931, with construction carried out by contracted carpenters, described as "two old Swedes". A ranger-built food cache and dog houses followed in 1933 and 1936.The design originated at Yellowstone National Park, adapted in this case with a somewhat larger size.
