= Two Medicine Campground Camptender's Cabin =

- U.S. National Register of Historic Places
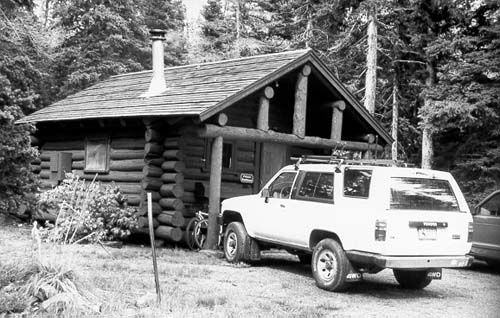

- Location within Montana Location within the United States
- Location: Two Medicine Lake, Glacier NP, East Glacier, Montana
- Coordinates: 48°29′18″N 113°21′54″W
- Architect: National Park Service
- MPS: Glacier National Park MPS
- NRHP reference No.: 95001580
- Added to NRHP: January 19, 1996

The Two Medicine Campground Camptender's Cabin in Glacier National Park is an example of the National Park Service Rustic style. Built in 1923 and altered in 1992, when it gained electricity, it was the chief point of administrative contact in the park's Two Medicine area and served as a seasonal ranger residence.

== See also ==
- Many Glacier Campground Camptender's Cabin
- Two Medicine General Store
