= Many Glacier Barn and Bunkhouse =

- U.S. National Register of Historic Places
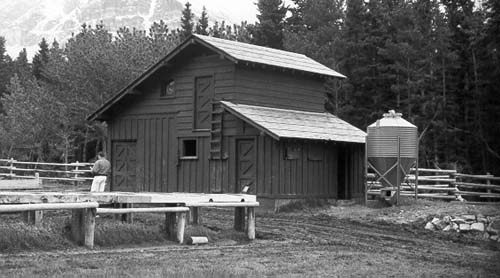
- Many Glacier Barn

- Location within Montana Location within the United States
- Location: Glacier Rt. 3 at Apikuni Flat, Glacier NP, St. Mary, Montana
- Coordinates: 48°48′4″N 113°38′33″W
- Built: 1938
- Architect: National Park Service
- MPS: Glacier National Park MPS
- NRHP reference No.: 95001570
- Added to NRHP: January 19, 1996

The Many Glacier Barn and Bunkhouse in Glacier National Park, also known as Packer's Roost East, were constructed to serve backcountry pack trail activities near the Many Glacier Hotel. The barn was designed in 1938 by the National Park Service Branch of Plans and Design to replace a barn that had burned in the Swiftcurrent Valley fire of 1936, using a simplified form of the National Park Service Rustic style. The bunkhouse was built nearby, then moved directly adjacent to the barn.

== See also ==
- Many Glacier Hotel
- Many Glacier Campground Camptender's Cabin
