= Redwood Meadow Ranger Station =

- U.S. National Register of Historic Places
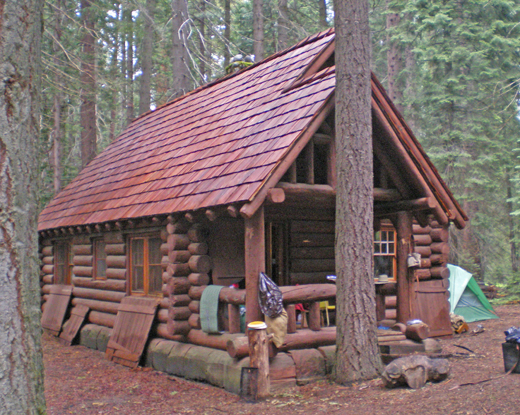

- Location within California Location within the United States
- Nearest city: Three Rivers, California
- Coordinates: 36°31′46″N 118°38′7″W
- Built: 1938
- Architect: National Park Service
- Architectural style: National Park Service Rustic
- NRHP reference No.: 78000289
- Added to NRHP: April 13, 1978

The Redwood Meadow Ranger Station was built in 1938 in Sequoia National Park. It was designed in 1938 by the National Park Service Branch of Plans and Designs, and was begun the following year and completed by 1941, using Civilian Conservation Corps labor. It is an example of the National Park Service Rustic style. The station consists of the three-room ranger station and a small barn.
