= Gunsight Pass Shelter =

- U.S. National Register of Historic Places
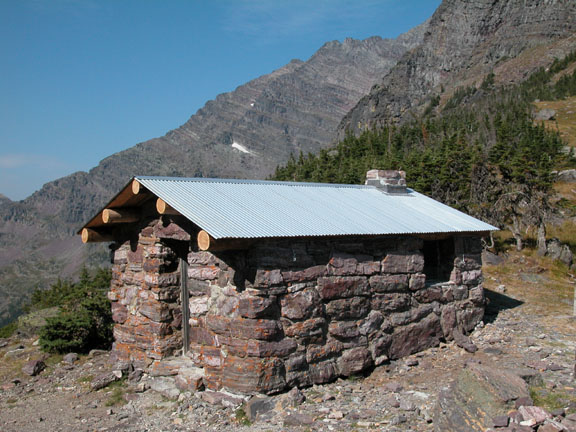

- Location within Montana Location within the United States
- Nearest city: West Glacier, Montana
- Coordinates: 48°36′34″N 113°44′16″W
- Built: 1932
- Architect: NPS Landscape Division
- MPS: Glacier National Park MRA
- NRHP reference No.: 86000344
- Added to NRHP: February 14, 1986

The Gunsight Pass Shelter in Glacier National Park is a rustic stone building near the treeline. The one-room shelter is equipped with a woodstove. Work began on the shelter in September 1931 and was complete in June 1932 to a design by the National Park Service Landscape Division. The design was inspired by similar cabins built by the Appalachian Mountain Club in the White Mountains of New Hampshire. The shelter is located on the South Loop Trail, itself listed on the National Register of Historic Places.
