= Graves Creek Ranger Station =

- U.S. National Register of Historic Places
- U.S. Historic district
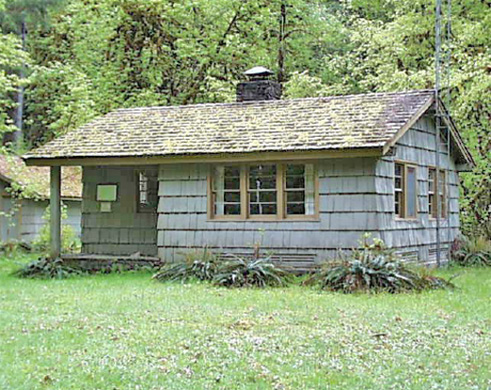

- Location within Washington (state)
- Nearest city: Port Angeles, Washington
- Coordinates: 47°34′15.58″N 123°34′46″W
- Area: 2 acres (0.81 ha)
- Architect: National Park Service; Civilian Conservation Corps
- Architectural style: Rustic
- MPS: Olympic National Park MPS
- NRHP reference No.: 07000717
- Added to NRHP: July 13, 2007

The Graves Creek Ranger Station is a small historic district in Olympic National Park, Washington, USA. It includes the first administrative buildings to be built by the National Park Service in the newly designated park. The district comprises two buildings built in 1939-41 by the National Park Service in the Graves Creek region of the western park. Labor from the Civilian Conservation Corps and the Public Works Administration was used for both the ranger station residence and the garage-woodshed, as well as for a generator building that no longer stands. The 1939 ranger station residence is a one-story frame structure, clad in cedar shingles. The garage is of similar construction, built in 1941. Both structures are examples of the late National Park Service Rustic style, featuring broad shingle courses and deep eaves.

Workers for the residence came from the Camp Elwha CCC camp in the northern portion of the park, the only CCC camp in the area in 1939. By 1941 another CCC camp was established near Lake Quinault at the Norwood Guard Station. The crew from the new camp went on in 1942 to construct a campground at Graves Creek.

The Graves Creek Historic District was placed on the National Register of Historic Places on July 13, 2007.
