= Many Glacier Campground Camptender's Cabin =

- U.S. National Register of Historic Places
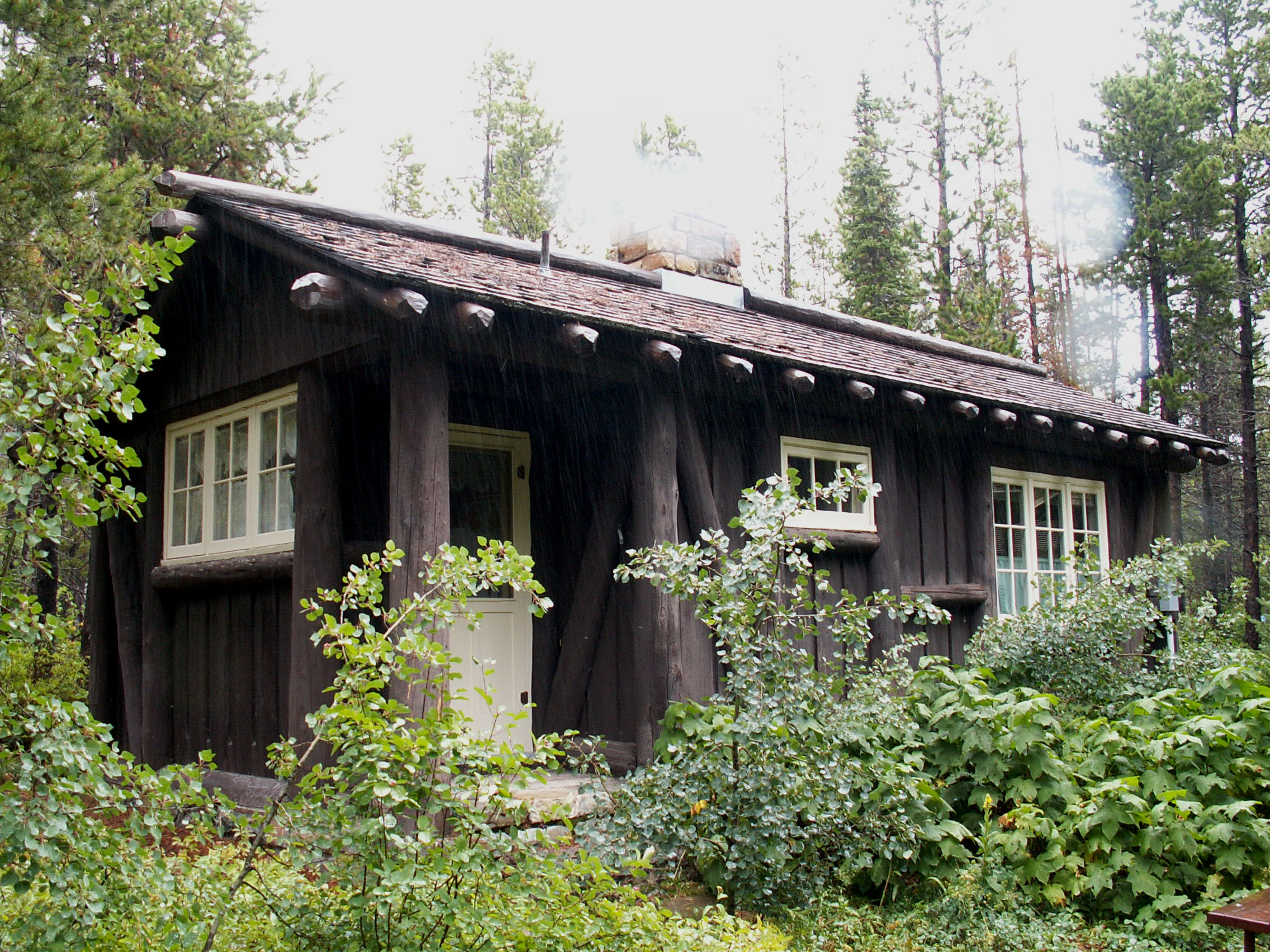

- Location within Montana Location within the United States
- Location: Many Glacier, Glacier NP, St. Mary, Montana
- Coordinates: 48°47′49″N 113°40′37″W
- Architect: National Park Service
- MPS: Glacier National Park MPS
- NRHP reference No.: 95001571
- Added to NRHP: January 19, 1996

The Many Glacier Campground Camptender's Cabin in Glacier National Park is an example of the National Park Service Rustic style. Built in 1934, the small cabin is significant for its association with park visitation patterns, auto camping, and NPS rustic architecture.

The Many Glacier Campground is located approximately 2 miles west of the Many Glacier Hotel and south of the Swiftcurrent Auto Camp. The Camptender's cabin is centrally located within the campground, amidst heavy timber. It is a single-story rectangular building constructed of an exposed-log framing system with vertical-plank siding. The building rests on a concrete-pier foundation and is covered by a log-frame side-gable roof surfaced with wood shingles. Pole purlins and rafters are exposed and the roof features a stone chimney extending from the gable ridge. A 2-step stoop of coursed, cut stone provides access to the vertical-plank door offset within the north elevation. Windows are 6 or 4-light wood frame, casement, arranged in groups of 2 or 3.

== See also ==
- Two Medicine Campground Camptender's Cabin
- Many Glacier Barn and Bunkhouse
- Many Glacier Hotel
