= Upper Toklat River Cabin No. 24 =

- U.S. National Register of Historic Places
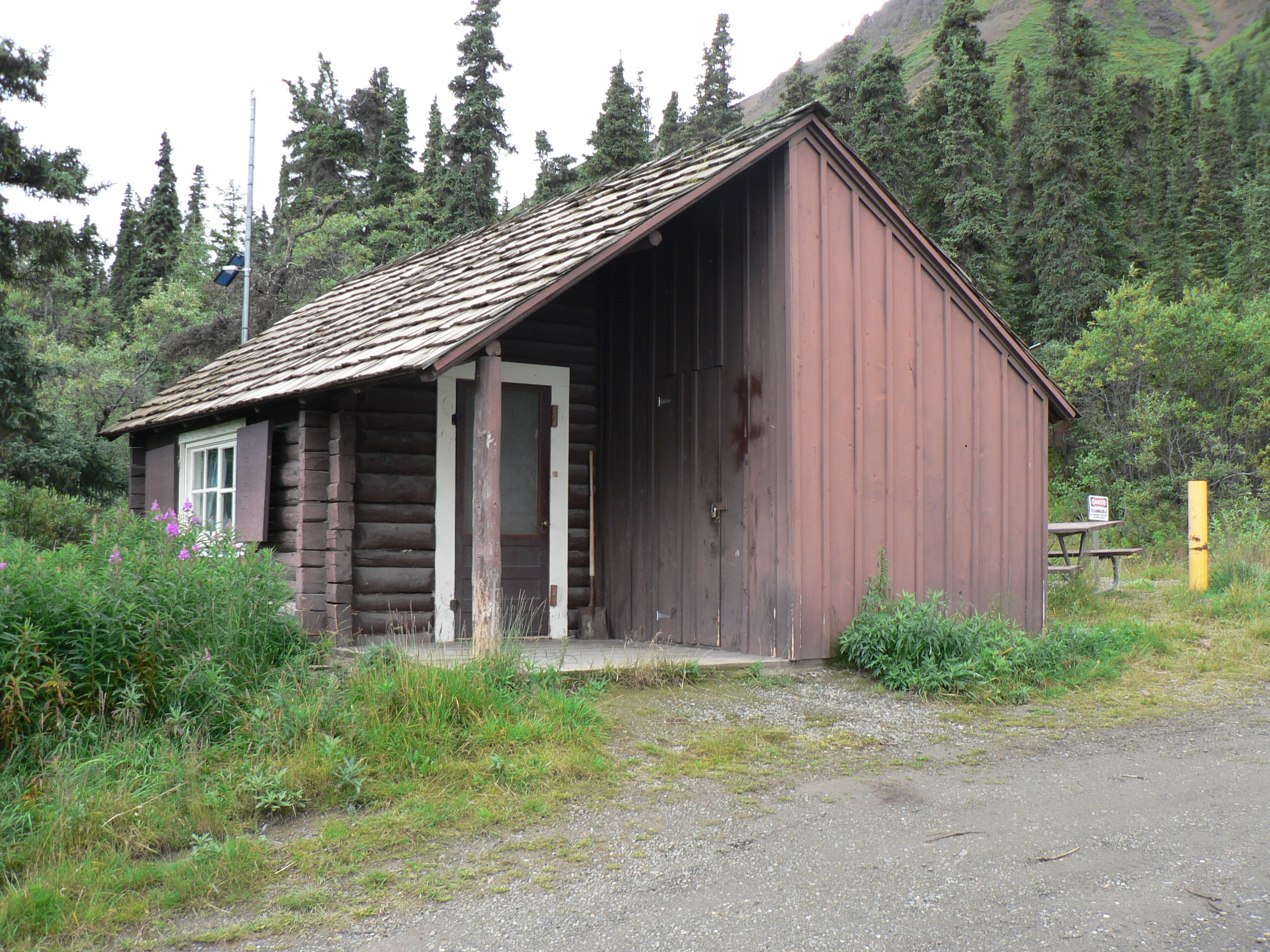

- Location within Alaska
- Location: Near main branch of Toklat River at Mile 53.7, west of Park Road, Denali National Park and Preserve, Alaska, U.S.
- Coordinates: 63°31′5″N 150°2′53″W
- Area: less than one acre
- Built: 1930
- Built by: Alaska Road Commission; National Park Service
- MPS: Patrol Cabins, Mount McKinley National Park TR
- NRHP reference No.: 86003211
- Added to NRHP: November 25, 1986

Upper Toklat Ranger Station No. 24, also known as the Upper Toklat River Cabin, is a log shelter in the National Park Service Rustic style in Denali National Park. The cabin is now part of a network of shelters for patrolling park rangers throughout the park. It is a standard design by the National Park Service Branch of Plans and Designs and was built in 1930. The cabin is one of five cabins originally built by the Alaska Road Commission to provide shelter to crews working on park roads. The Upper Toklat River cabin is centrally located and was a distribution point for supplies.
