= Ewe Creek Ranger Cabin No. 8 =

- U.S. National Register of Historic Places
- Location within Alaska
- Location: 5 miles (8.0 km) downstream on the Savage River from Park Highway. Near Ewe Creek, Denali National Park & Preserve, Alaska
- Coordinates: 63°48′4″N 149°20′59″W
- Area: less than one acre
- Built: 1931
- Built by: National Park Service
- Architectural style: Log cabin
- MPS: Patrol Cabins, Mount McKinley National Park TR
- NRHP reference No.: 86003217
- Added to NRHP: November 25, 1986

The Ewe Creek Ranger Cabin No. 8, also known as Lower Savage River Cabin and Lower Savage Patrol Cabin, is a historic backcountry shelter in Denali National Park and Preserve. It is located 5 miles (8.0 km) (river miles) downstream (north) from the park highway, on the banks of the Savage River. It is fashioned from peeled logs, with the gaps filled with moss, oakum, and chinking. The gable roof is corrugated metal. The cabin is one of four built by the National Park Service in the park in 1931. The cabin is used by rangers who patrol the park's backcountry.

The cabin was listed on the National Register of Historic Places in 1986.
