= Moose Creek Ranger Cabin No. 19 =

- U.S. National Register of Historic Places
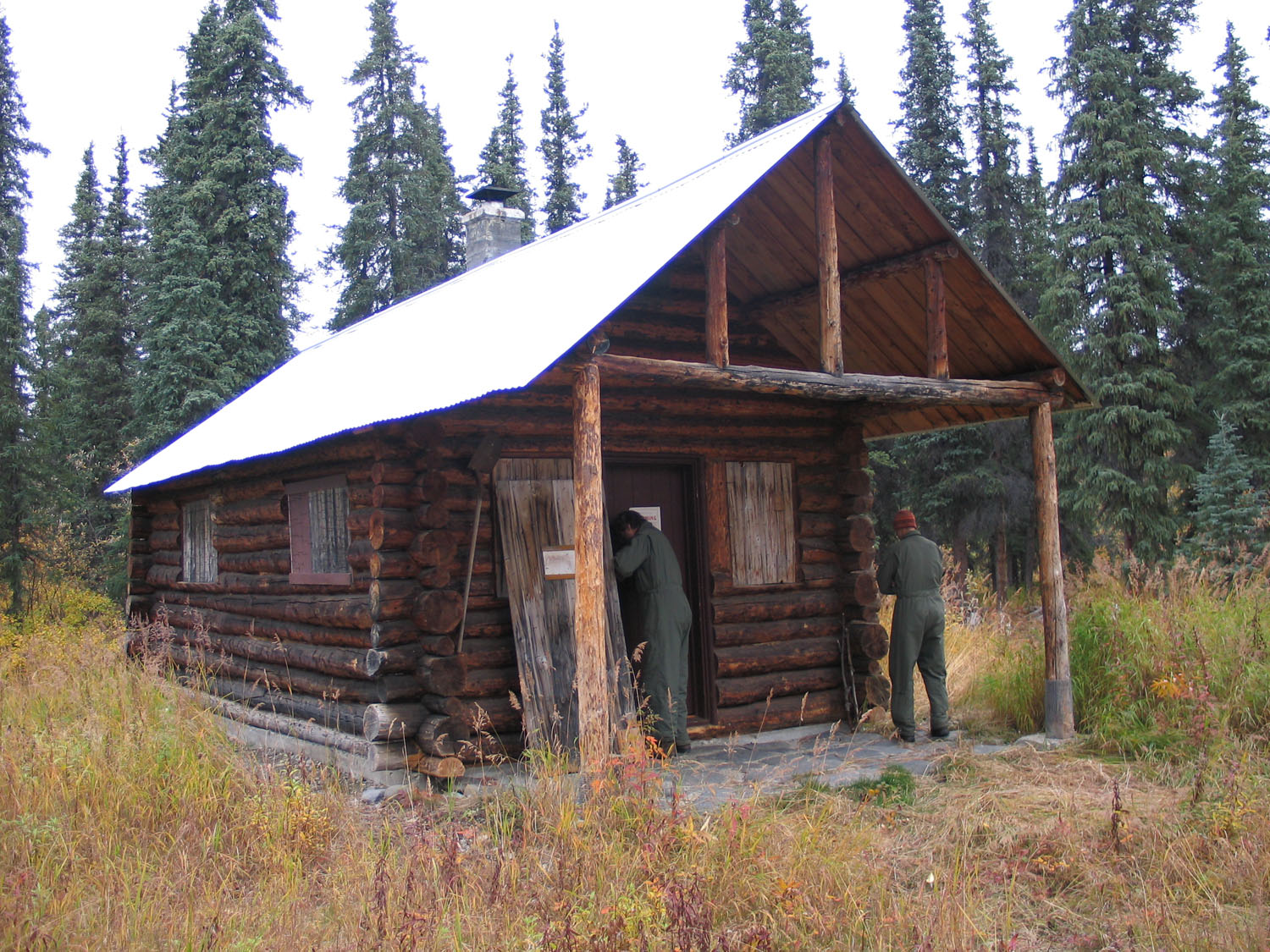
- Moose Creek Ranger Cabin

- Location within Alaska
- Location: 5 miles (8.0 km) north of Mile 73.8 on Park Road, Denali National Park and Preserve, Alaska, U.S.
- Coordinates: 63°29′6″N 150°37′22″W
- Area: less than one acre
- Built: 1935
- Built by: National Park Service
- Architect: National Park Service
- MPS: Patrol Cabins, Mount McKinley National Park TR
- NRHP reference No.: 86003231
- Added to NRHP: November 25, 1986

Moose Creek Ranger Cabin No. 19, also known as Moose Creek Patrol Cabin and Moose Creek Shelter Cabin, is a log shelter in the National Park Service Rustic style in Denali National Park. The cabin is part of a network of shelters for patrolling park rangers throughout the park. It is a standard design by the National Park Service Branch of Plans and Designs and was built in 1935. (Note: While report the cabin as built in 1934, its construction was not finished until 1935, as can be read in.) The cabin has five separate log dog kennels, also to a standard Park Service design, as well as an elevated food cache.

The cabin was the last patrol cabin built in Denali.

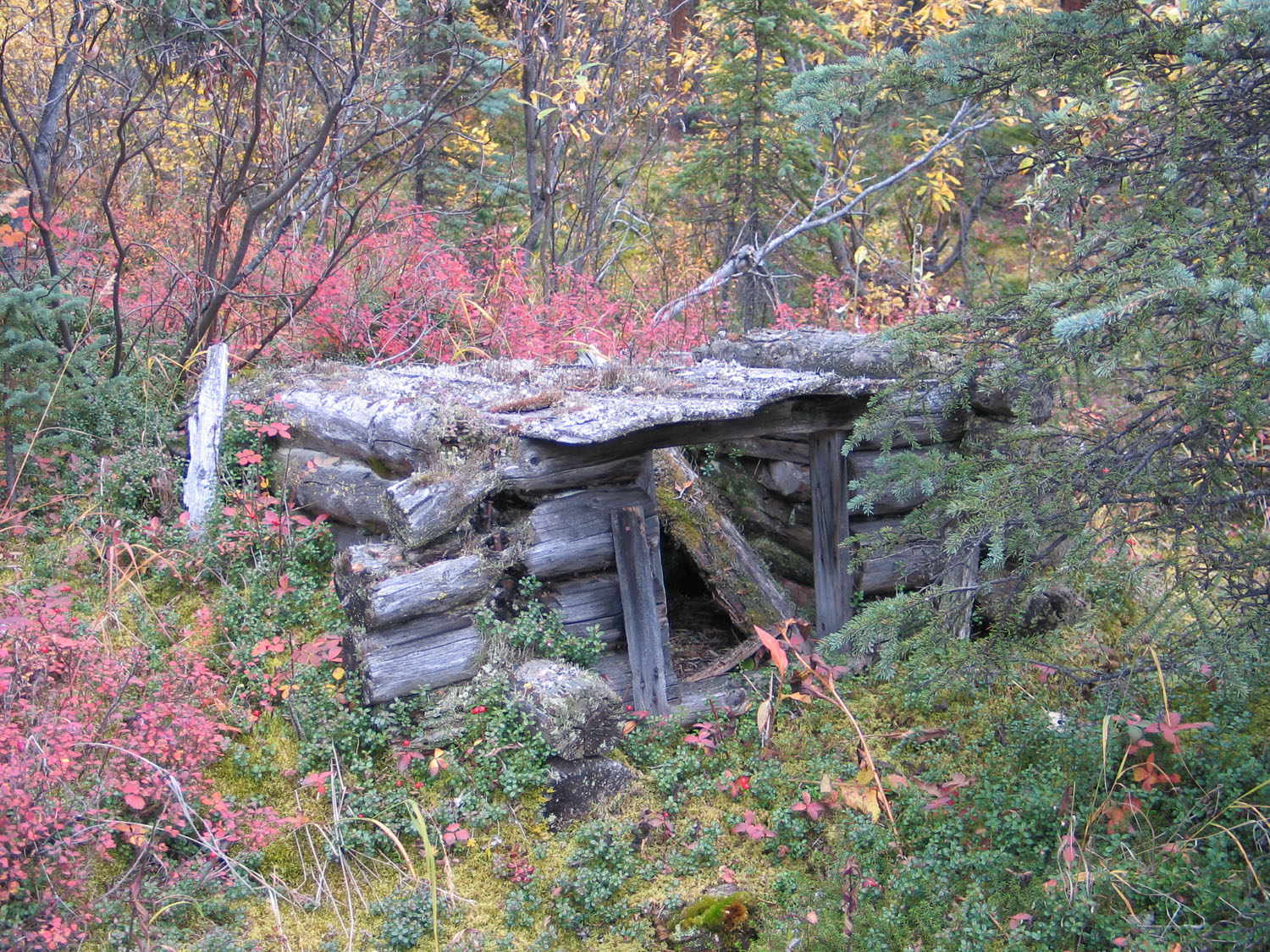
Moose Creek dog houses

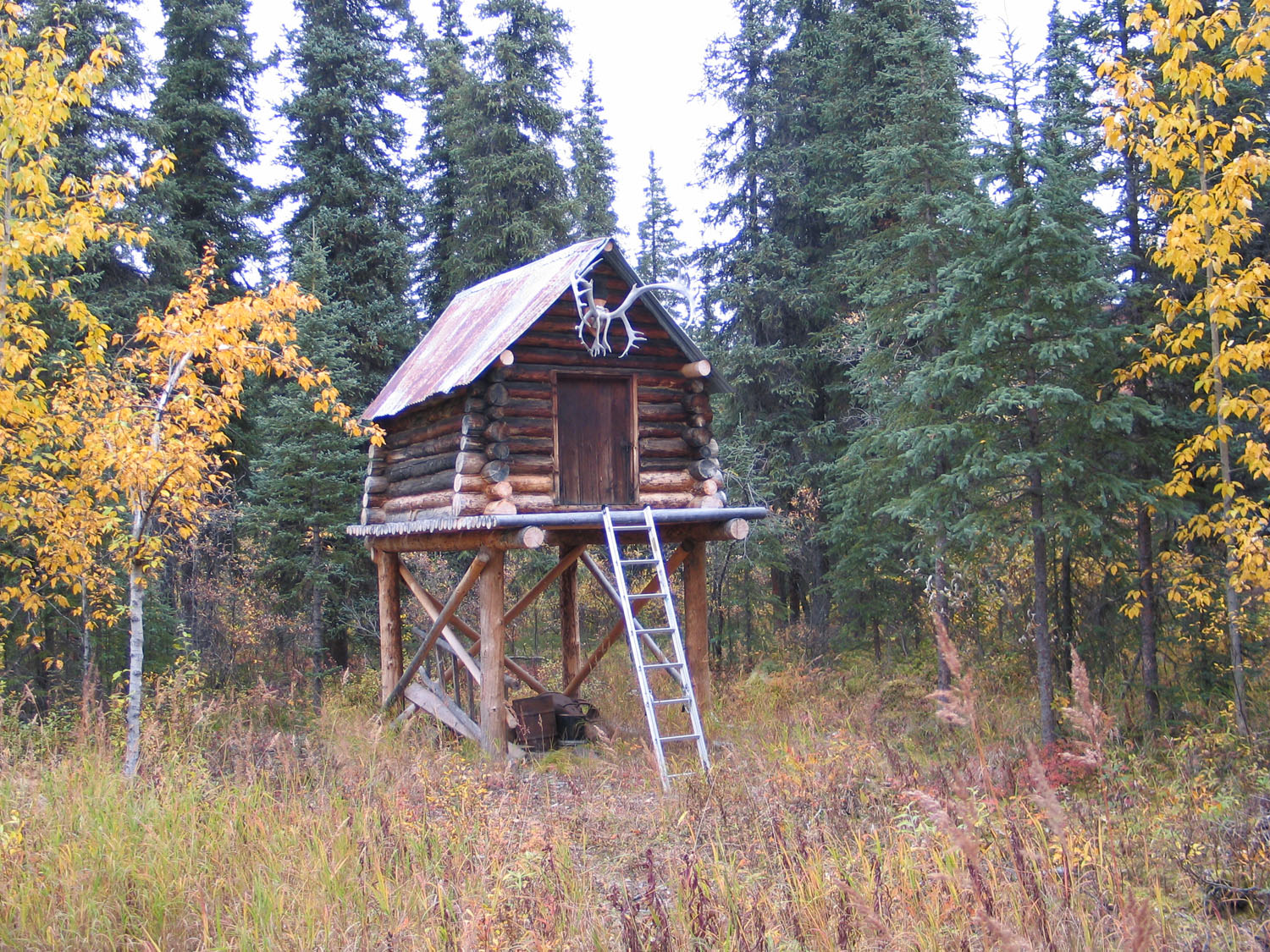
Moose Creek food cache
