= National Register of Historic Places listings in Sequoia-Kings Canyon National Parks =

This is a list of the National Register of Historic Places listings in Sequoia and Kings Canyon National Parks.

This is intended to be a complete list of the properties and districts on the National Register of Historic Places in Sequoia National Park and Kings Canyon National Park, California, United States. The locations of National Register properties and districts for which the latitude and longitude coordinates are included below, may be seen in a Google map.

There are 23 properties and districts listed on the National Register in the park.

This National Park Service list is complete through NPS recent listings posted June 20, 2025.

== Current listings ==
	Name on the Register	Image	Date listed	Location	City or town	Description
1	Ash Mountain Entrance Sign	Ash Mountain Entrance Sign	April 27, 1978 (#78000367)	N of Three Rivers in Sequoia National Park; 36°29′15″N 118°50′09″W	Three Rivers	
2	Barton-Lackey Cabin	Barton-Lackey Cabin	March 30, 1978 (#78000290)	Kings Canyon National Park; 36°42′46″N 118°34′59″W	Cedar Grove	
3	Bearpaw Meadow High Sierra Camp	Bearpaw Meadow High Sierra Camp	April 21, 2016 (#16000192)	Sequoia National Park; 36°33′55″N 118°37′17″W	Three Rivers	
4	Cabin Creek Ranger Residence and Dormitory	Cabin Creek Ranger Residence and Dormitory	April 27, 1978 (#78000368)	SE of Wilsonia on Generals Highway in Sequoia National Park; 36°38′56″N 118°48′49″W	Wilsonia	
5	Cattle Cabin	Cattle Cabin	September 15, 1977 (#77000150)	NE of Three Rivers on Sequoia National Park; 36°34′18″N 118°45′11″W	Three Rivers	
6	Gamlin Cabin	Gamlin Cabin	March 8, 1977 (#77000123)	NW of Wilsonia; 36°44′56″N 118°58′13″W	Wilsonia	
7	Generals' Highway Stone Bridges	Generals' Highway Stone Bridges	September 13, 1978 (#78000284)	N of Mineral King in Sequoia National Park; 36°36′27″N 118°44′46″W	Mineral King	
8	Giant Forest Lodge Historic District	Giant Forest Lodge Historic District	May 5, 1978 (#78000287)	NE of Three Rivers in Sequoia National Park; 36°33′56″N 118°45′58″W	Three Rivers	
9	Giant Forest Village-Camp Kaweah Historic District	Giant Forest Village-Camp Kaweah Historic District	May 22, 1978 (#78000311)	N of Three Rivers in Sequoia National Park; 36°33′52″N 118°46′24″W	Three Rivers	
10	Groenfeldt Site		March 30, 1978 (#78000288)	Address Restricted	Three Rivers	
11	Hockett Meadow Ranger Station	Hockett Meadow Ranger Station	April 27, 1978 (#78000369)	S of Silver City in Sequoia National Park; 36°22′37″N 118°39′19″W	Silver City	
12	Hospital Rock	Hospital Rock	August 29, 1977 (#77000122)	Address Restricted	Three Rivers	
13	Knapp Cabin	Knapp Cabin	December 20, 1978 (#78000291)	W of Cedar Grove in Kings Canyon National Park; 36°47′02″N 118°38′09″W	Cedar Grove	
14	Mineral King Road Cultural Landscape	Mineral King Road Cultural Landscape	October 24, 2003 (#03001063)	Mineral King Rd, Sequoia National Park; 36°26′49″N 118°40′50″W	Mineral King	
15	Moro Rock Stairway	Moro Rock Stairway	December 29, 1978 (#78000283)	N of Three Rivers in Sequoia National Park; 36°32′39″N 118°45′51″W	Three Rivers	
16	John Muir Memorial Shelter	John Muir Memorial Shelter	August 15, 1978 (#16000576)	CA 180, Grant Grove Village in Kings Canyon National Park; 37°06′43″N 118°40′15″W	Grant Grove	
17	Pear Lake Ski Hut	Pear Lake Ski Hut	May 5, 1978 (#78000285)	N of Mineral King on Sequoia National Park; 36°36′29″N 118°40′15″W	Mineral King	
18	Quinn Ranger Station	Quinn Ranger Station	April 13, 1977 (#77000118)	S on Mineral King on Sequoia National Park; 36°19′29″N 118°34′33″W	Mineral King	
19	Redwood Meadow Ranger Station	Redwood Meadow Ranger Station	April 13, 1978 (#78000289)	NE of Three Rivers in Sequoia National Park; 36°31′46″N 118°38′07″W	Three Rivers	
20	Shorty Lovelace Historic District	Shorty Lovelace Historic District	January 31, 1978 (#78000293)	E of Pinehurst on Kings Canyon National Park; 36°44′26″N 118°31′03″W	Pinehurst	
21	Smithsonian Institution Shelter	Smithsonian Institution Shelter	March 8, 1977 (#77000119)	W of Lone Pine in Sequoia National Park; 36°34′49″N 118°17′32″W	Lone Pine	
22	Squatter's Cabin	Squatter's Cabin	March 8, 1977 (#77000116)	NE of Three Rivers; 36°33′31″N 118°45′09″W	Three Rivers	
23	Tharp's Log	Tharp's Log	March 8, 1977 (#77000117)	NE of Three Rivers; 36°33′40″N 118°44′29″W	Three Rivers	

== See also ==
- National Register of Historic Places listings in Fresno County, California
- National Register of Historic Places listings in Tulare County, California
- National Register of Historic Places listings in California
