= National Register of Historic Places listings in Tulare County, California =

Location of Tulare County in California

This is a list of the National Register of Historic Places listings in Tulare County, California.

This is intended to be a complete list of the properties and districts on the National Register of Historic Places in Tulare County, California, United States. Latitude and longitude coordinates are provided for many National Register properties and districts; these locations may be seen together in an online map.

There are 37 properties and districts listed on the National Register in the county.

This National Park Service list is complete through NPS recent listings posted September 4, 2026.

== Current listings ==
	Name on the Register	Image	Date listed	Location	City or town	Description
1	Allensworth Historic District	Allensworth Historic District	February 23, 1972 (#72000263)	Town of Allensworth and its environs along CA 43; 35°51′45″N 119°23′12″W	Allensworth	
2	Ash Mountain Entrance Sign	Ash Mountain Entrance Sign	April 27, 1978 (#78000367)	N of Three Rivers in Sequoia National Park; 36°29′15″N 118°50′09″W	Three Rivers	
3	Bank of Italy Building	Bank of Italy Building	April 1, 1982 (#82002280)	128 E. Main St. 36°19′49″N 119°17′16″W	Visalia	
4	Barton-Lackey Cabin	Barton-Lackey Cabin	March 30, 1978 (#78000290)	N of Mineral King in Kings Canyon National Park; 36°42′46″N 118°34′59″W	Mineral King	
5	Bearpaw High Sierra Camp	Bearpaw High Sierra Camp	April 21, 2016 (#16000192)	Along High Sierra Trail, 11 mi. east of Crescent Meadow, Sequoia National Park; 36°33′54″N 118°37′17″W	Three Rivers	
6	Cabin Creek Ranger Residence and Dormitory	Cabin Creek Ranger Residence and Dormitory	April 27, 1978 (#78000368)	SE of Wilsonia on Generals Highway in Sequoia National Park; 36°38′56″N 118°48′49″W	Wilsonia	
7	Cattle Cabin	Cattle Cabin	September 15, 1977 (#77000150)	NE of Three Rivers in Sequoia National Park; 36°34′18″N 118°45′11″W	Three Rivers	
8	C. A. Elster Building	C. A. Elster Building	March 25, 1982 (#82002279)	CA 190 and Tule River Dr. 36°07′50″N 118°48′59″W	Springville	
9	Exeter Public Library	Exeter Public Library	December 10, 1990 (#90001811)	309 S. E St. 36°17′36″N 119°08′17″W	Exeter	
10	First Congregational Church	First Congregational Church	January 5, 1999 (#98001553)	165 E. Mill St. 36°04′07″N 119°00′43″W	Porterville	
11	Generals' Highway Stone Bridges	Generals' Highway Stone Bridges	September 13, 1978 (#78000284)	N of Mineral King in Sequoia National Park; 36°36′27″N 118°44′46″W	Mineral King	
12	Giant Forest Lodge Historic District	Giant Forest Lodge Historic District	May 5, 1978 (#78000287)	NE of Three Rivers in Sequoia National Park; 36°33′56″N 118°45′58″W	Three Rivers	
13	Giant Forest Village-Camp Kaweah Historic District	Giant Forest Village-Camp Kaweah Historic District	May 22, 1978 (#78000311)	N of Three Rivers in Sequoia National Park; 36°33′52″N 118°46′24″W	Three Rivers	
14	Groenfeldt Site		March 30, 1978 (#78000288)	Address Restricted	Three Rivers	
15	Hockett Meadow Ranger Station	Hockett Meadow Ranger Station	April 27, 1978 (#78000369)	S of Silver City in Sequoia National Park; 36°22′37″N 118°39′19″W	Silver City	
16	Hospital Rock	Hospital Rock	August 29, 1977 (#77000122)	Address Restricted	Three Rivers	
17	Hyde House	Hyde House	April 26, 1979 (#79000565)	500 S. Court St. 36°19′33″N 119°17′28″W	Visalia	
18	Jeremiah D. and Mary Hyde House	Jeremiah D. and Mary Hyde House	September 5, 2024 (#100010826)	513 N. Encina Street; 36°20′04″N 119°17′41″W	Visalia	
19	Mineral King Road Cultural Landscape	Mineral King Road Cultural Landscape	October 24, 2003 (#03001063)	Mineral King Rd., Sequoia National Park; 36°26′49″N 118°40′50″W	Mineral King	
20	Moro Rock Stairway	Moro Rock Stairway	December 29, 1978 (#78000283)	N of Three Rivers in Sequoia National Park; 36°32′39″N 118°45′51″W	Three Rivers	
21	Orosi Branch Library	Orosi Branch Library	August 25, 1983 (#83001247)	12662 Ave. 416; 36°32′42″N 119°17′22″W	Orosi	
22	Pear Lake Ski Hut	Pear Lake Ski Hut	May 5, 1978 (#78000285)	N of Mineral King in Sequoia National Park; 36°36′29″N 118°40′15″W	Mineral King	
23	Pogue Hotel	Pogue Hotel	August 5, 1991 (#91000927)	32792 Sierra Dr. (CA 198); 36°22′58″N 119°01′25″W	Lemon Cove	
24	Quinn Ranger Station	Quinn Ranger Station	April 13, 1977 (#77000118)	S of Mineral King in Sequoia National Park; 36°19′29″N 118°34′33″W	Mineral King	
25	Redwood Meadow Ranger Station	Redwood Meadow Ranger Station	April 13, 1978 (#78000289)	NE of Three Rivers in Sequoia National Park; 36°31′46″N 118°38′07″W	Three Rivers	
26	Sequoia Field- Visalia-Dinuba School of Aeronautics	Sequoia Field- Visalia-Dinuba School of Aeronautics	June 9, 2000 (#99001591)	Near jct. of Ave. 368 and Road 112, 9 mi (14 km). N of Visalia; 36°26′51″N 119°19′15″W	Visalia	
27	Shorty Lovelace Historic District	Shorty Lovelace Historic District	January 31, 1978 (#78000293)	E of Pinehurst in Kings Canyon National Park; 36°44′26″N 118°31′03″W	Pinehurst	
28	Smithsonian Institution Shelter	Smithsonian Institution Shelter	March 8, 1977 (#77000119)	W of Lone Pine in Sequoia National Park; 36°34′49″N 118°17′32″W	Lone Pine	
29	Squatter's Cabin	Squatter's Cabin	March 8, 1977 (#77000116)	NE of Three Rivers; 36°33′31″N 118°45′09″W	Three Rivers	
30	Tenalu		September 4, 1986 (#86002194)	Address Restricted	Porterville	
31	Tharp's Log	Tharp's Log	March 8, 1977 (#77000117)	NE of Three Rivers; 36°33′40″N 118°44′29″W	Three Rivers	
32	The Pioneer		May 5, 1977 (#77000358)	27000 S. Mooney Blvd. 36°16′50″N 119°18′43″W	Visalia	
33	Tulare Union High School Auditorium and Administration Building	Tulare Union High School Auditorium and Administration Building	December 17, 1999 (#99001566)	755 E. Tulare Ave. 36°12′32″N 119°20′17″W	Tulare	
34	US Post Office-Porterville Main	US Post Office-Porterville Main	January 11, 1985 (#85000141)	65 W. Mill Ave. 36°04′07″N 119°01′01″W	Porterville	
35	US Post Office-Visalia Town Center Station	US Post Office-Visalia Town Center Station	January 11, 1985 (#85000142)	11 W. Acequia St. 36°19′41″N 119°17′27″W	Visalia	
36	Wilsonia Historic District		March 14, 1996 (#95001151)	Roughly bounded by Pine Ln., Fern Ln., Hillcrest Rd., Sierra Ln., Kaweah Ln., Goddard Ln. and Park Rd. 36°44′05″N 118°57′22″W	Wilsonia	
37	Zalud House	Zalud House	March 31, 1987 (#86003681)	393 N. Hockett St. 36°04′21″N 119°00′56″W	Porterville	

== See also ==
- List of National Historic Landmarks in California
- National Register of Historic Places listings in California
- California Historical Landmarks in Tulare County, California
