= Barton House =

Barton House may refer to:

== United States ==
- Abraham Barton House, Lexington, Kentucky
- Barton House (Florissant, Missouri)
- Guy C. Barton House, Omaha, Nebraska
- George Barton House, Buffalo, New York
- Pauline Cheek Barton House, Memphis, Tennessee
- Barton House (Salado, Texas)
- William Barton House, Beaver, Utah
- Barton Villa, also known as Barton House, Redlands, California

== Other uses ==
- Barton House, Bristol, England

== See also ==
- Barton Hall, Cherokee, Alabama, United States
- Barton-Lackey Cabin, Mineral King, California, United States
- Clara Barton National Historic Site, Glen Echo, Maryland, United States
- Clara Barton Homestead, Oxford, Massachusetts, United States
- Reed and Barton Complex, Taunton, Massachusetts, United States
- Barton Historic District, West Bend, Wisconsin, United States
