= Montgomery House =

Montgomery House may refer to:

== United Kingdom ==
- Montgomery House (Seaforth, Liverpool), in Seaforth, Merseyside
- Montgomery House (Aldershot), headquarters of the British Army Home Command

== United States ==
- Montgomery-Janes-Whittaker House, Prattville, Alabama, listed on the National Register of Historic Places (NRHP) in Autaga County
- Pogue Hotel, Lemon Cove, California, also known as Montgomery House, NRHP-listed in Tulare County
- Montgomery House (Los Angeles, California), a popular hotel and saloon in 1850s Los Angeles, owned by William C. Getman
- Montgomery House (Wilmington, Delaware), NRHP-listed
- John Rogerson Montgomery House, Glencoe, Illinois, NRHP-listed in Cook County
- Conklin-Montgomery House, Cambridge City, Indiana, listed on the NRHP in Indiana
- Burnett-Montgomery House, Fairfield, Iowa, listed on the NRHP in Iowa
- Montgomery House (Clay Village, Kentucky), listed on the NRHP in Kentucky
- Todd-Montgomery Houses, Danville, Kentucky, listed on the NRHP in Kentucky
- Montgomery House (Donansburg, Kentucky), listed on the NRHP in Kentucky
- William Montgomery House (Elizabethtown, Kentucky), listed on the NRHP in Kentucky
- Dr. Thomas Montgomery House, Stanford, Kentucky, listed on the NRHP in Kentucky
- Montgomery House (Madison, Mississippi), listed on the NRHP in Mississippi
- I. T. Montgomery House, Mound Bayou, Mississippi, listed on the NRHP in Mississippi
- Montgomery House (Claysville, Pennsylvania), listed on the NRHP in Pennsylvania
- General William Montgomery House, Danville, Pennsylvania, listed on the NRHP in Pennsylvania
- William Montgomery House (Lancaster, Pennsylvania), listed on the NRHP in Pennsylvania
- Nathaniel Montgomery House, Pawtucket, Rhode Island, listed on the NRHP in Rhode Island
- Walter Scott Montgomery House, Spartanburg, South Carolina, listed on the NRHP in South Carolina
- Montgomery House (Montgomery, Vermont), listed on the NRHP in Vermont

== See also ==
- William Montgomery House (disambiguation)
- Montgomery Court (disambiguation)
