= Hockett =

Hockett is a surname. Notable people with the surname include:

- Charles F. Hockett (1916–2000), American linguist
- Jesse Hockett (1983–2010), American sprint car racer
- Oris Hockett (1909–1969), American baseball player
- Robert C. Hockett, American lawyer, law professor, and policy advocate

== See also ==
- Hockett Meadow Ranger Station, a location in Sequoia National Forest
