= Harold G. Fowler =

American landscape architect

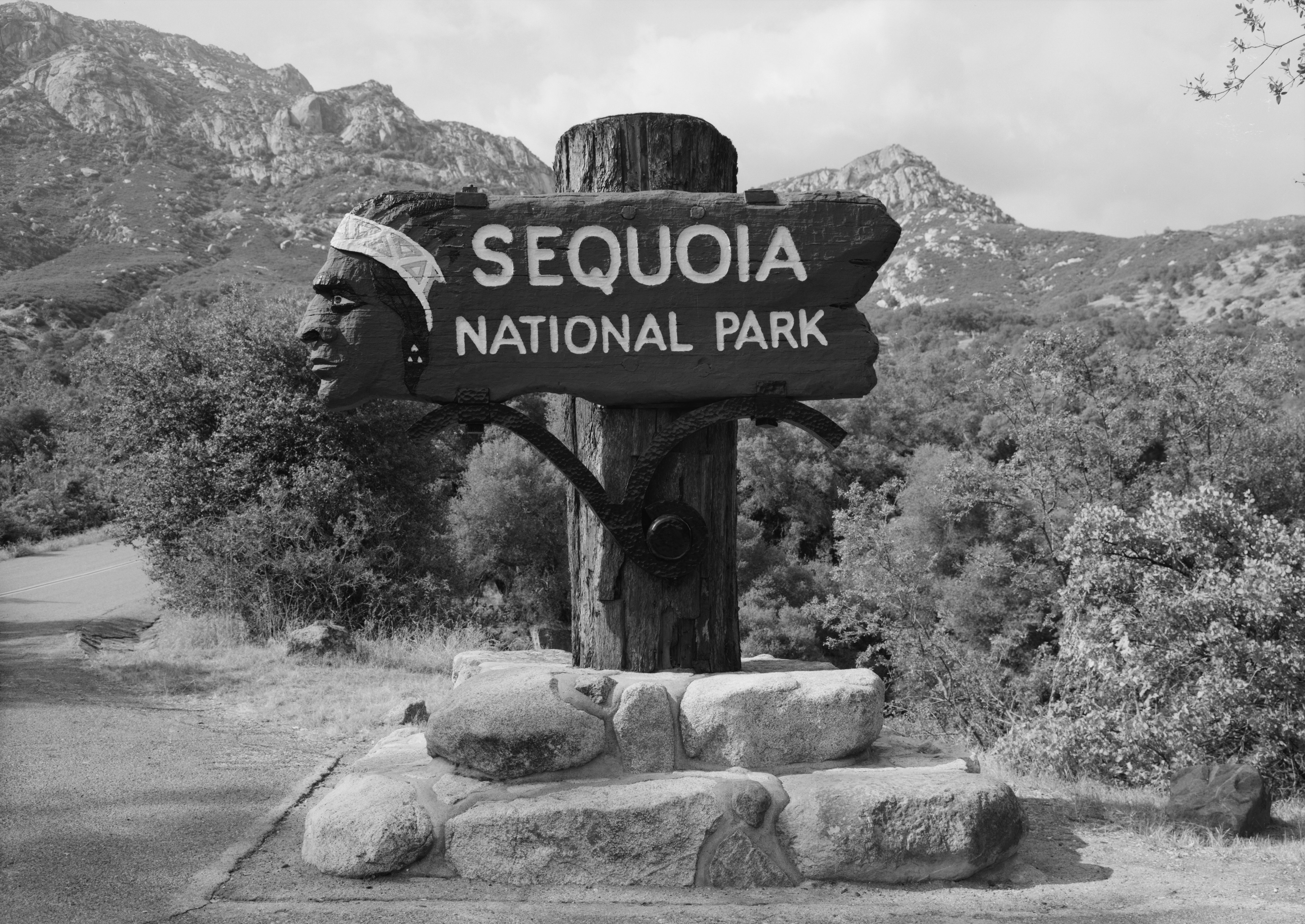
Ash Mountain Entrance Sign

Harold G. Fowler was an American landscape architect who worked for the National Park Service.

Fowler's works include:

- Ash Mountain Entrance Sign, North of Three Rivers in Sequoia National Park, Three Rivers, California, NRHP-listed
- Cabin Creek Ranger Residence and Dormitory, Generals Highway in Sequoia National Park, southeast of Wilsonia, California (National Park Service: landscape architect Harold G. Fowler; Emergency Conservation Work landscape architect Lloyd Fletcher), NRHP-listed

Fowler was one of two Principal Landscape Architects of the Generals Highway, following Merel S. Sager in that role.

Fowler assessed the possibility of opening what became the Hidden Valley ski area.
