= Montgomery Court =

Montgomery Court may refer to:

- Montgomery Court (Portland State University), designed by A. E. Doyle and acquired by Portland State University for use as a residence hall in 1969. Demolished in 2026.
- Montgomery Court (Denver, Colorado), listed on the National Register of Historic Places

== See also ==
- Montgomery House (disambiguation)
- Montgomery County Courthouse (disambiguation)
