= Sentinel Tree =

Giant sequoia tree in California, United States

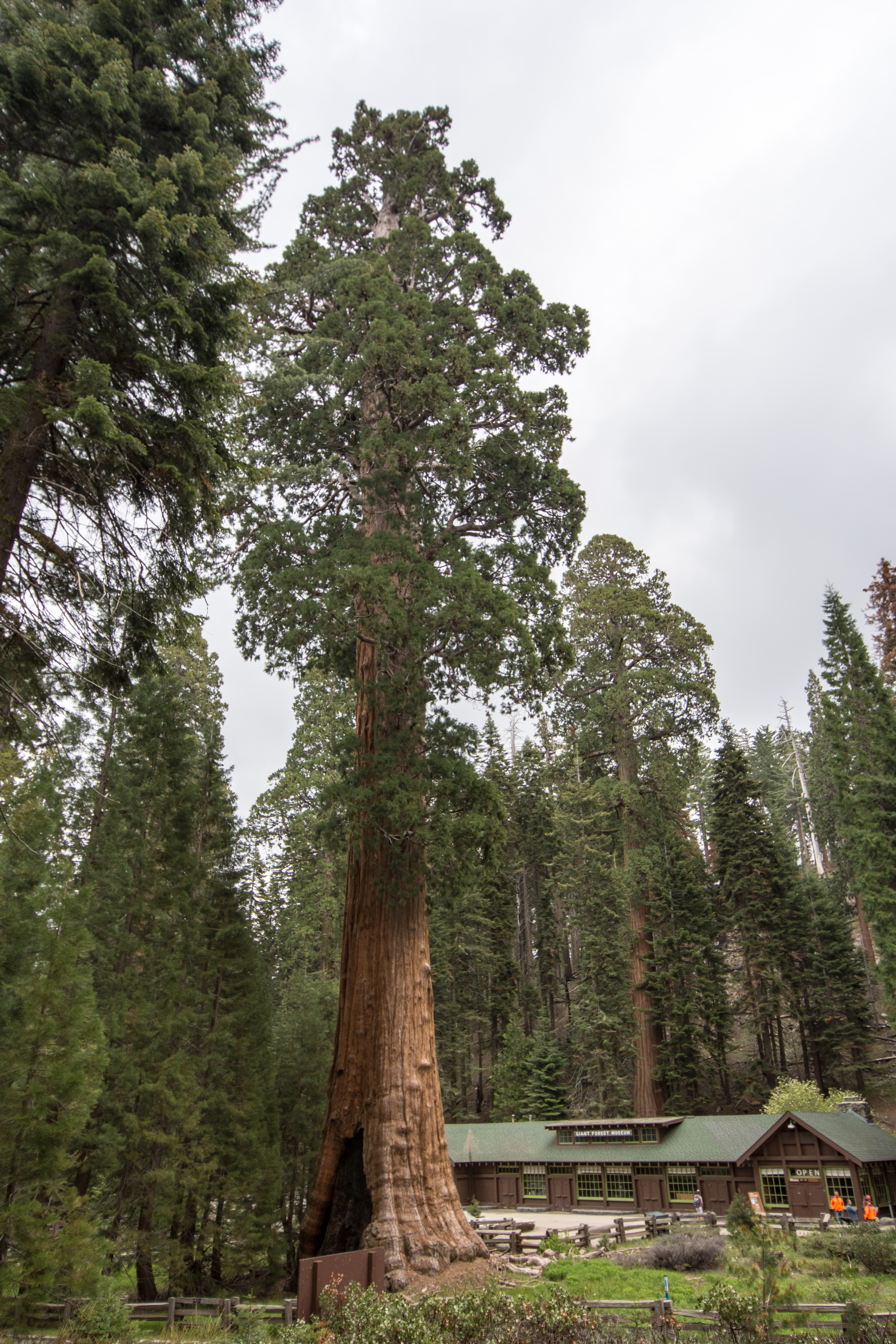
The Sentinel Tree and the Giant Forest Museum

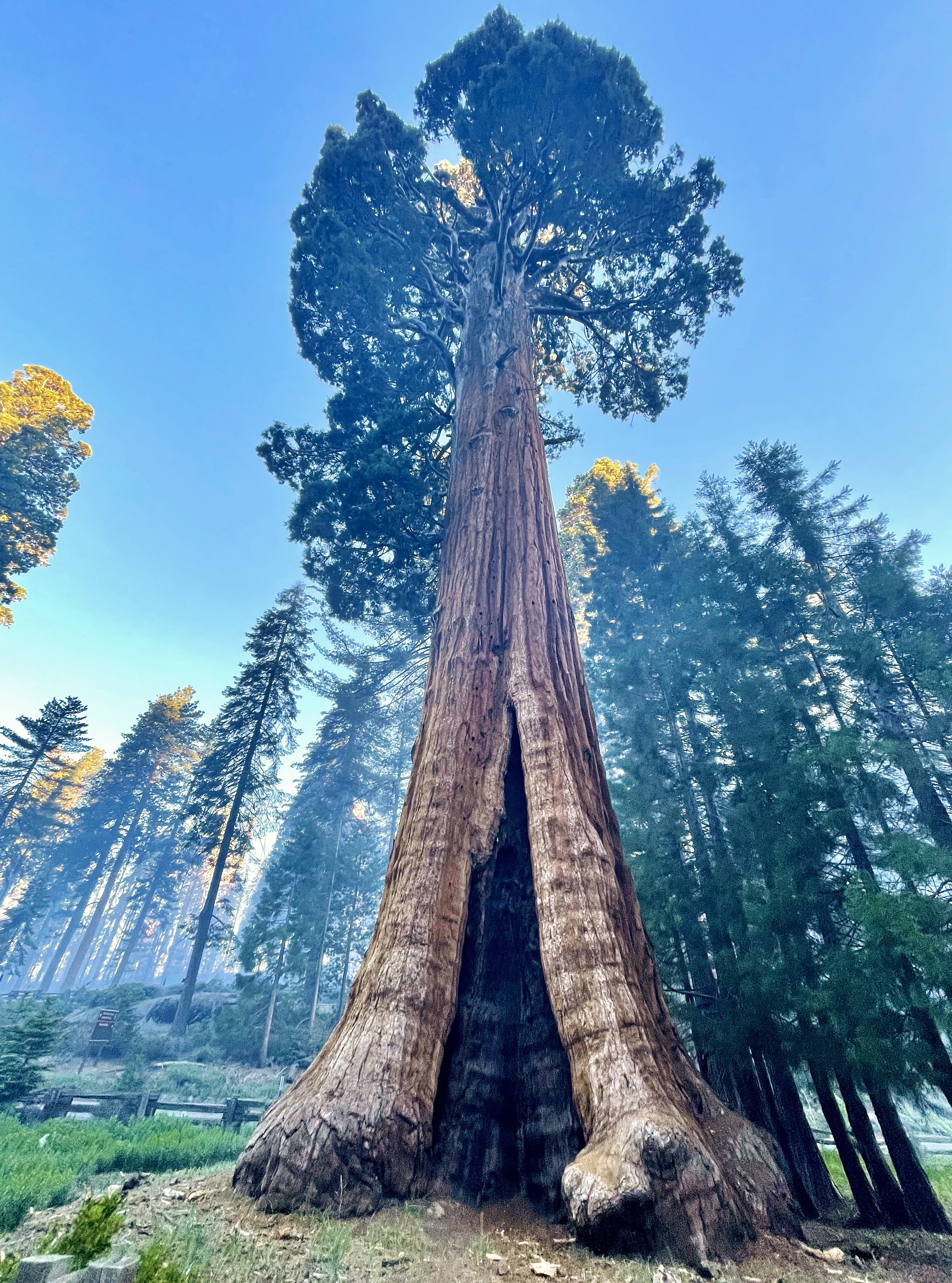
The other side of the Sentinel Tree; this side of the tree faces the Giant Forest Museum

The Sentinel Tree is a giant sequoia located within the Giant Forest Grove of Sequoia National Park, California. It is the 43rd largest giant sequoia in the world, and could be considered either the 42nd or 41st largest depending on how badly Ishi Giant and Black Mountain Beauty have atrophied following devastating wildfires in 2015 and 2017, respectively.

== Description ==
The tree stands directly in front of the Giant Forest Museum, from which one can get close to the base of the tree. It features a lush canopy and two prominent burn scars at the base of the trunk.

== Dimensions ==
The dimensions of the Sentinel Tree as measured by Flint and Law are shown below. The calculated volume ignores burns.

	Metres	Feet
Height above base	78.52	257.6
Diameter 1.5 m above base	7.65	25.1
Estimated bole volume (m^{3}.ft^{3})	790.04	27,900

== See also ==
- List of largest giant sequoias
- List of individual trees
