= William Montgomery House =

William Montgomery House may refer to:

in the United States

- William Montgomery House (Elizabethtown, Kentucky), listed on the NRHP in Kentucky
- William Montgomery House (Lancaster, Pennsylvania), listed on the NRHP in Pennsylvania

== See also ==
- Montgomery House (disambiguation)
