= Sprint Bandits =

- Sport: Auto racing
- Jurisdiction: United States
- Affiliation: American Sprint Car Series
- Headquarters: Tulsa, Oklahoma

Official website
- www.sprintbandits.com
- (United States)

Sprint Bandits is an open-wheel auto racing sanctioning body that organizes the O'Reilly Sprint Bandits Tour 'N Topless (TNT) Midwest Swing event for wingless 410-ci sprint cars. Sprint Bandits is part of a larger organization, the American Sprint Car Series, (ASCS).

== 2008 Tour 'N Topless Midwest Swing Schedules ==
2008 TNT Tour
Date	Location	Track	Track Type/Winner
8/11	Wheatland, MO	Lucas Oil Speedway	Winner: Robert Ballou
8/12	Greenwood, NE	I-80 Speedway @ Nebraska Raceway Park	Winner: Dave Darland
8/13	Oklahoma City, OK	State Fair Speedway	Winner: Brady Bacon
8/14	Sapulpa, OK	Creek County Speedway	Winner: Brady Bacon
8/15	Kansas City, KS	Lakeside Speedway	Winner: Brady Bacon
8/16	Kansas City, KS	Lakeside Speedway - $10,000 to Win	Winner: Robert Ballou

Past O'Reilly Sprint Bandits TNT Midwest Swing Champions:
2004 - Shane Stewart*
2005 - Levi Jones
2006 - Jesse Hockett
2007 - Robert Ballou and Tim Kaeding, Co-Champions
2008 - Dave Darland
2009 - Brady Bacon
2010 - Robert Ballou

- Winged 410 Sprint Cars in 2004
