= United States Post Office (Porterville, California) =

United States historic post office

- US Post Office--Porterville Main
- U.S. National Register of Historic Places
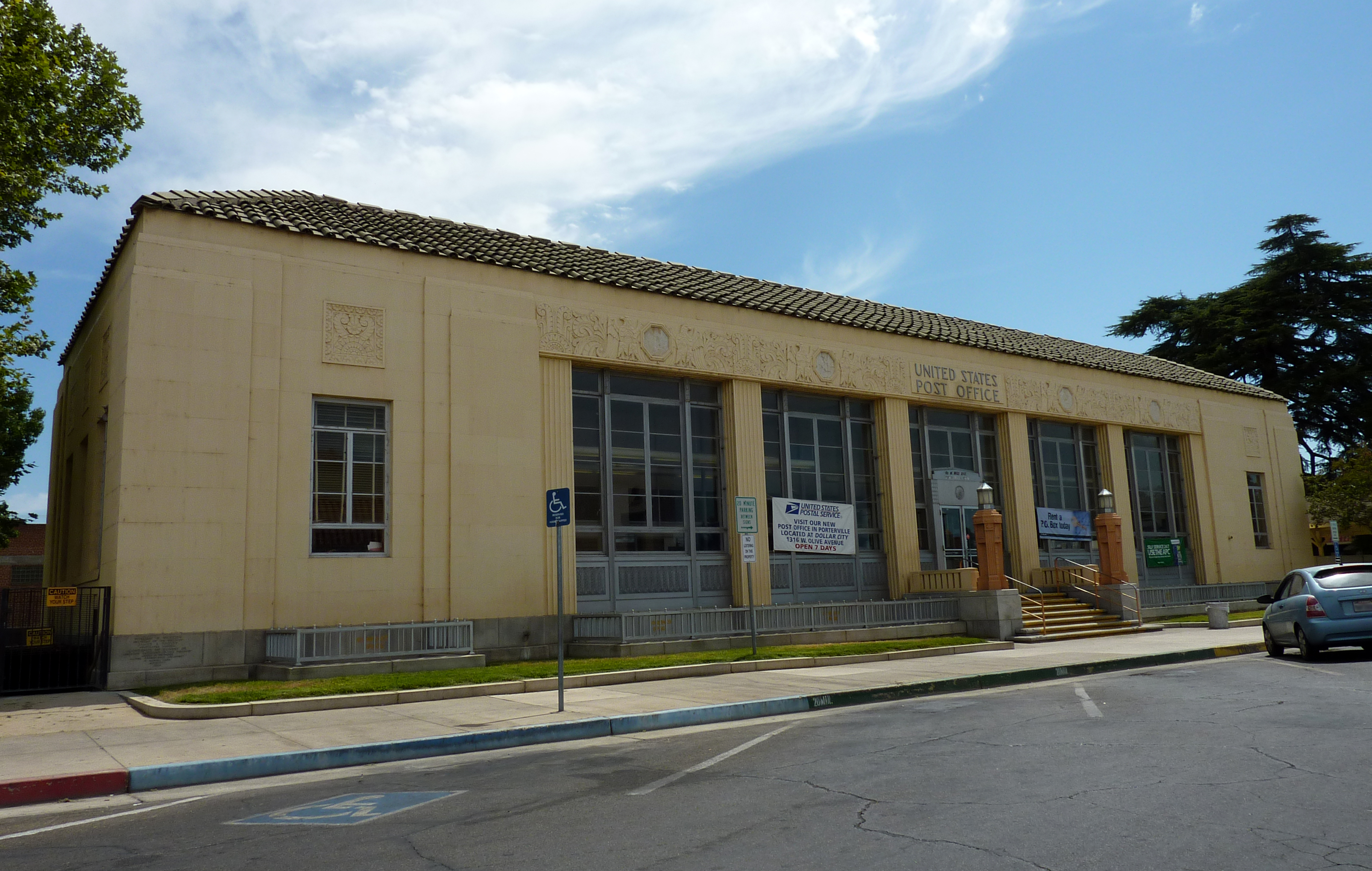

- Location within California Location within the United States
- Location: 65 W. Mill Ave., Porterville, California
- Coordinates: 36°4′7″N 119°1′1″W
- Area: 1 acre (0.40 ha)
- Built: 1933–1937
- Architect: Lake, H. Rafael
- Architectural style: Art Deco
- MPS: US Post Office in California 1900-1941 TR
- NRHP reference No.: 85000141
- Added to NRHP: January 11, 1985

The U.S. Post Office, located at 65 W. Mill Ave., is the main post office in Porterville, California. Built from 1933 to 1937, the post office was designed by H. Rafael Lake in the Art Deco style. The design features decorative terra cotta plaques over the windows and cast aluminum plaques below the front windows, decorative features used in no other building in Porterville. A terra cotta frieze atop the front entry features eagle and acanthus motifs borrowed from Roman designs and a sunrise pattern typical of Art Deco decorations. The building is topped with a green tile roof, an unusual element in Art Deco buildings which is consistent with the vernacular Mission Revival style common in Porterville architecture. The post office is one of three Art Deco post offices remaining in California.

The post office was added to the National Register of Historic Places as US Post Office–Porterville Main on January 11, 1985.

== See also ==
- National Register of Historic Places listings in Tulare County, California
- List of United States post offices
