= Knapp Cabin =

Historic house in California, United States

- U.S. National Register of Historic Places
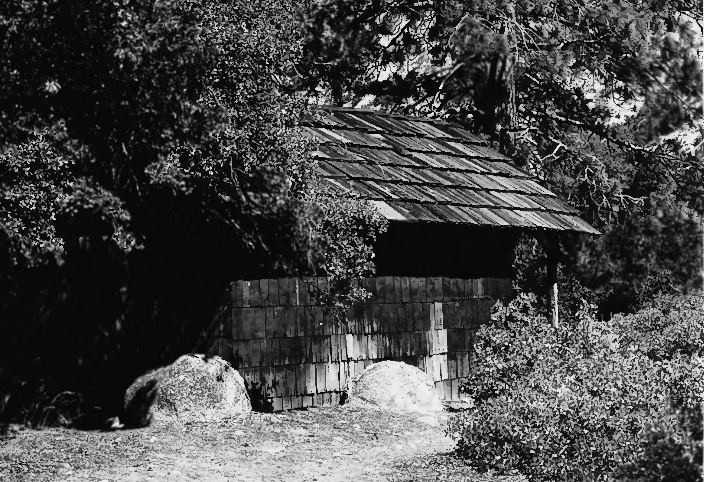
- Park Service photo, 1975

- Location within California Location within the United States
- Nearest city: Cedar Grove, California
- Coordinates: 36°47′2″N 118°38′9″W
- Area: 0.2 acres (0.081 ha)
- Built: 1925
- Built by: Knapp, George Owen
- NRHP reference No.: 78000291
- Added to NRHP: December 20, 1978

Knapp Cabin is a historic cabin located in Kings Canyon National Park, west of Cedar Grove, in Fresno County, California.

== History ==
The one-room cabin was built in 1925 by George Owen Knapp, founder of Union Carbide. Knapp used the cabin for storage while camping in the area. After Knapp stopped camping in 1928, he no longer used the cabin.

The cabin saw occasional use until the creation of Kings Canyon National Park in 1940. In the 1950s, the National Park Service assumed maintenance of the cabin.

The Knapp Cabin was added to the National Register of Historic Places on December 20, 1978.

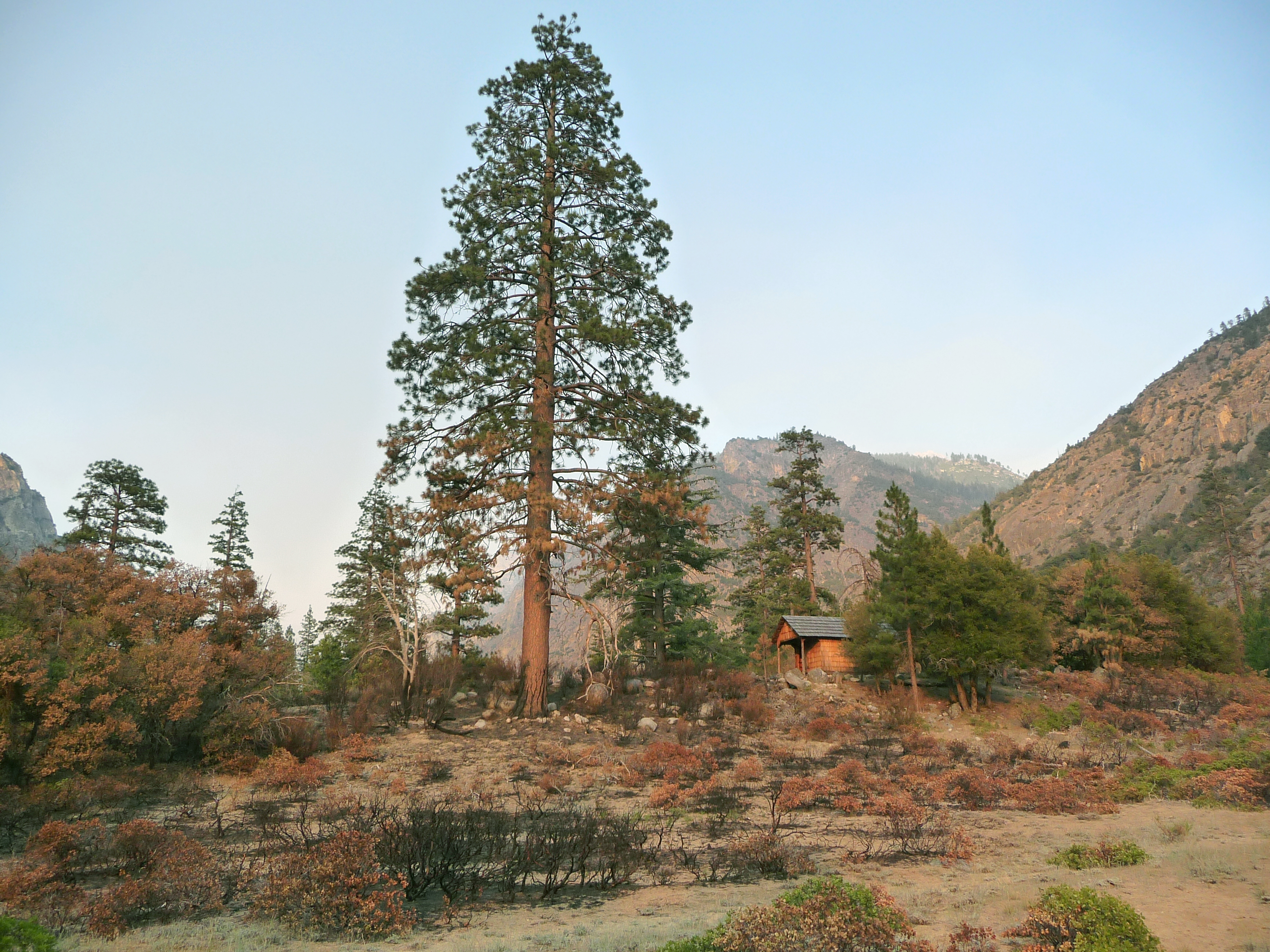
Knapp Cabin and Jeffrey pine (Pinus jeffreyi), on a moraine in Kings Canyon National Park.

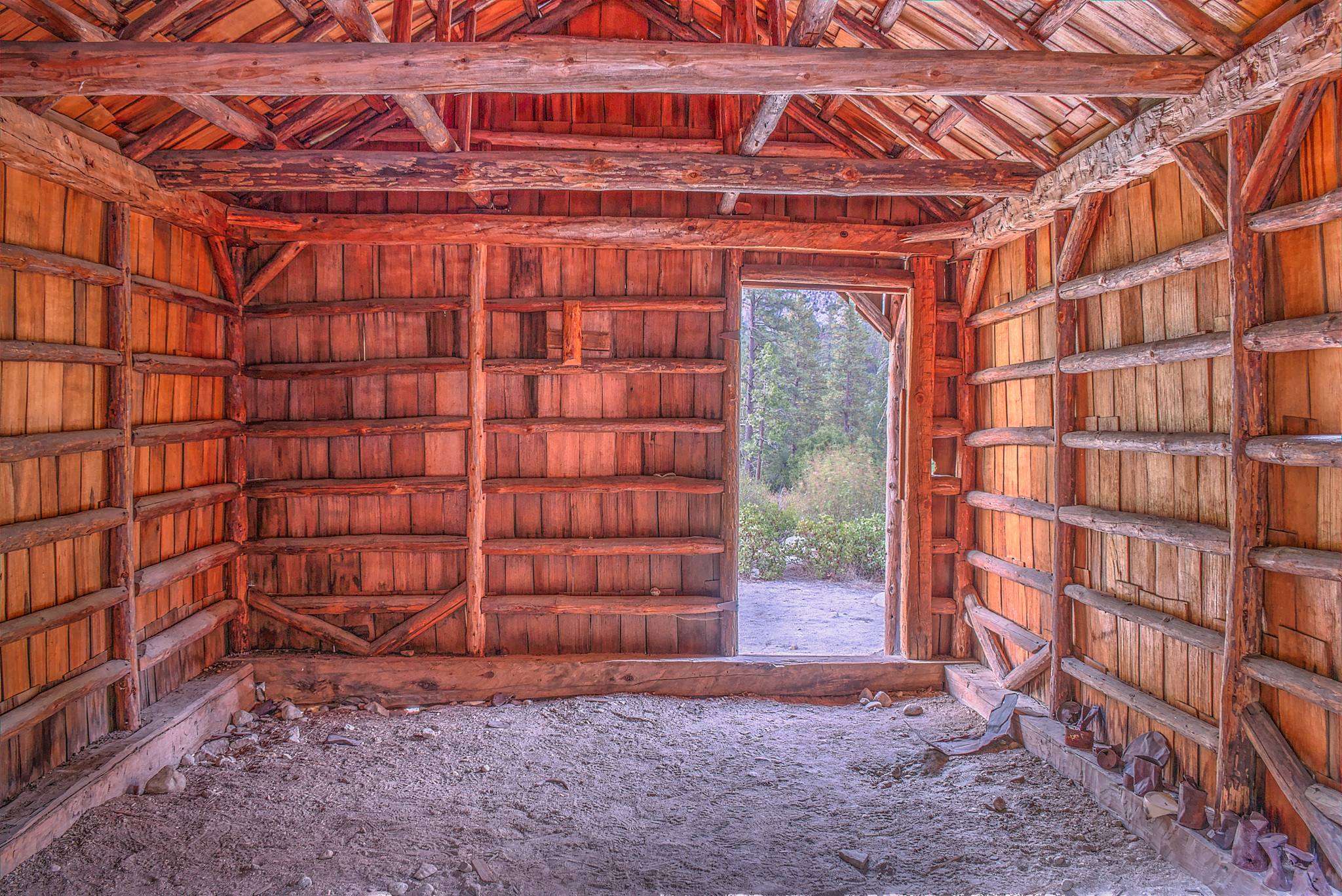
Interior of Cabin

== See also ==
- National Register of Historic Places listings in Sequoia-Kings Canyon National Parks
