= Hidden Valley (Ski Estes Park) =

Former ski resort in Colorado, United States

- Location: Rocky Mountain National Park; Estes Park, Colorado, United States
- Status: Defunct
- Opened: 1955
- Closed: 1991
- Owner: National Park Service
- Vertical: 2,000 ft (610 m)
- Top elevation: 11,400 ft (3,500 m)

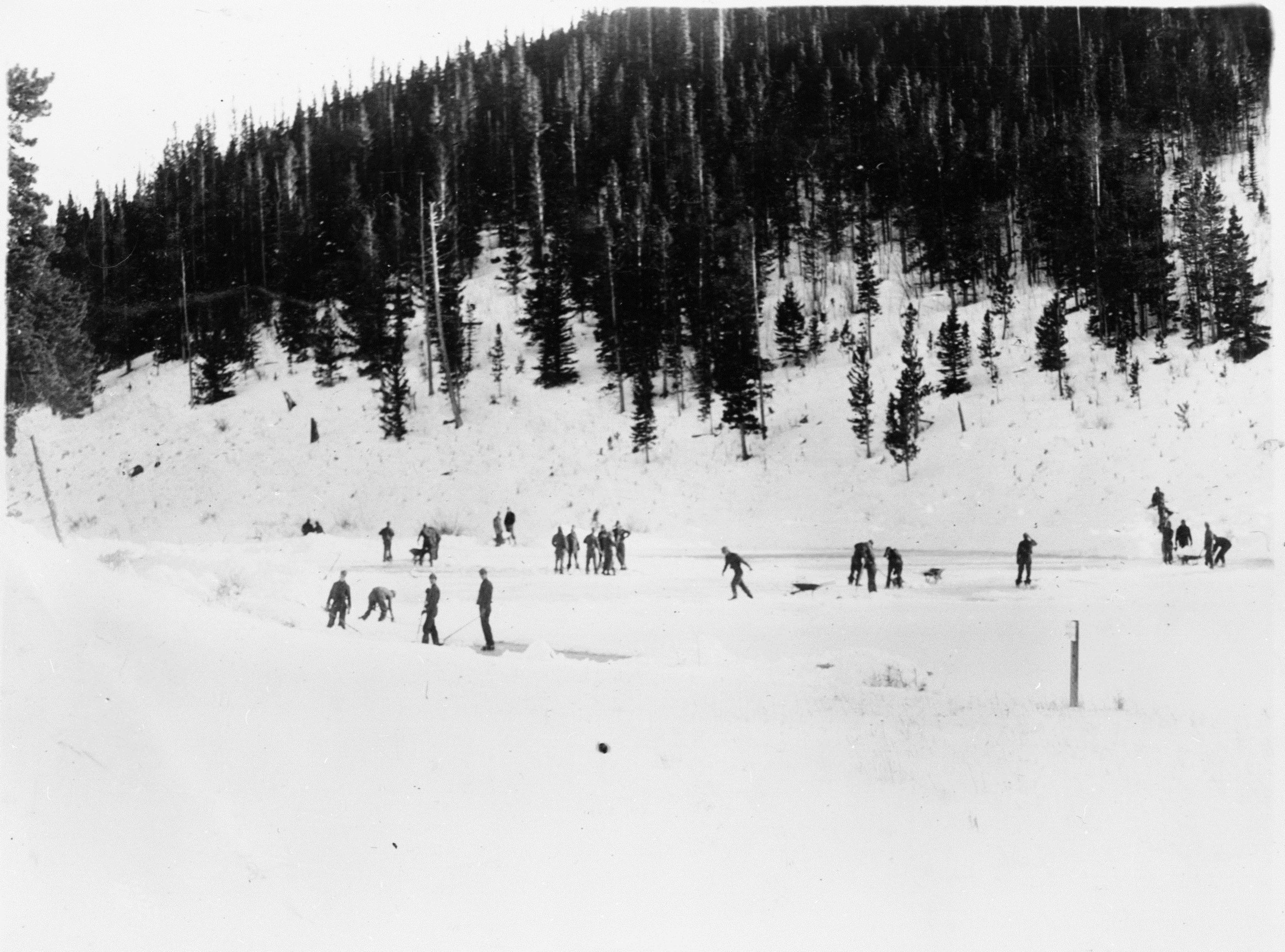
The Hidden Valley Skating Pond, a part of the Hidden Valley Ski Area

Hidden Valley, also known as Ski Estes Park, was a ski area near Estes Park, Colorado in Rocky Mountain National Park. It opened in 1955, and operated until 1991 when the National Park Service closed the ski area.

== History ==
Skiing in Hidden Valley dates back to 1917. A ski tournament was held in Hidden Valley in June 1931 by the then newly-established Rocky Mountain National Park Ski Club.

In 1953, the Colorado Senate authorized a request to construct a ski lift in Hidden Valley, which was ultimately constructed in 1954 as a T bar lift. By 1955, two platter lifts were in operation. A ski lodge was also constructed at the foot of the valley in time for the resort's opening in December 1955. The National Park Service seemed reluctant about opening it at all, and seemed to have succumbed to local pressure. NPS landscape architect Harold G. Fowler happened to be involved in assessing its feasibility.

A 1976 report by Sno-Engineering of Aspen, Colorado recommended that the National Park Service purchase the ski facilities from Rocky Mountain Park Co., the concessioner that had operated the ski resort since 1955. By 1978, the Estes Park Recreation and Park District began managing the ski area on behalf of the Park Service, but it was noted that profability began to decline. A 1989 report noted that the ski area was not economically viable in its current form. Several options to improve the ski area were listed, including installing a new chairlift and increasing the length of the ski season with the purchase of new snowmaking equipment, all at a considerable cost.

== See also ==
- Trail Ridge Road § Miscellanea
