= Montgomery House (Wilmington, Delaware) =

Historic house in Delaware, United States

- U.S. National Register of Historic Places
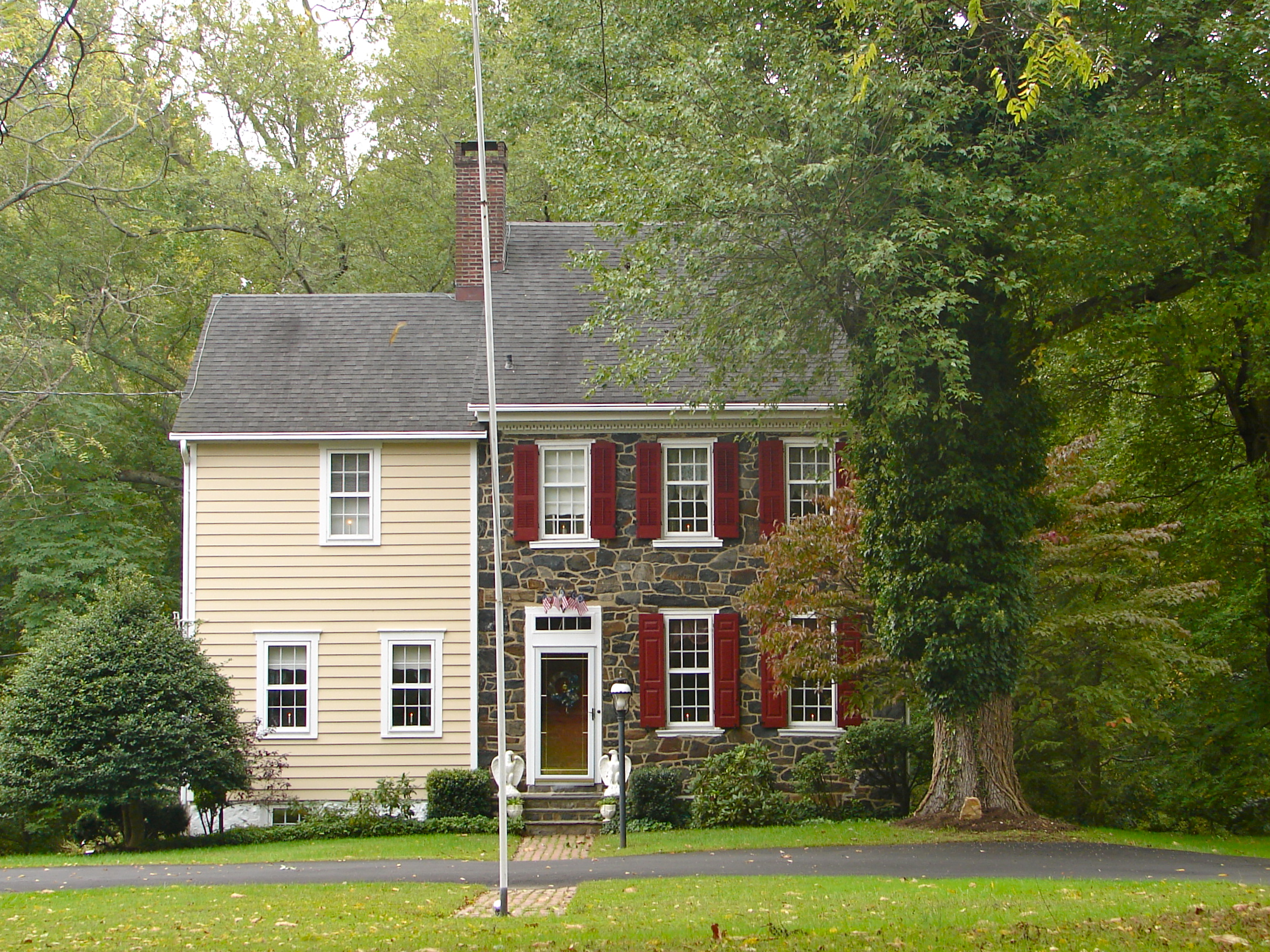
- Montgomery House, October 2011

- Location within Delaware Location within the United States
- Location: 2900 Old Limestone Rd., near Wilmington, Delaware
- Coordinates: 39.73149°N 75.67075°W
- Area: 2.4 acres (0.97 ha)
- Built: 1789
- Architectural style: Penn plan bank house
- NRHP reference No.: 88001160
- Added to NRHP: July 28, 1988

Montgomery House is a historic home located near Wilmington, New Castle County, Delaware. It was built in 1789, and is a two- to three-story, three bay wide, gable roofed, Penn Plan banked dwelling of uncoursed fieldstone. It has a two-story frame addition at the south side of the house that dates from the 1950s. Also on the property are a contributing frame stable and a small frame well house.

It was added to the National Register of Historic Places in 1988.
