= Ash Mountain Entrance Sign =

Sign at Sequoia National Park

- U.S. National Register of Historic Places

- Location within California Location within the United States
- Nearest city: Three Rivers, California
- Coordinates: 36°29′15″N 118°50′9″W
- Built: 1935
- Architect: George Muno, Harold Fowler, Merel S. Sager
- Architectural style: Woodworking, wrought iron
- NRHP reference No.: 78000367
- Added to NRHP: April 27, 1978

The Ash Mountain Entrance Sign is a sign at Sequoia National Park located just past the Ash Mountain Entrance Station which serves as the southern entryway into the park. It was constructed in 1935 by craftsmen of the Civilian Conservation Corps and features a carved Native American face. The sign was made from blocks of sequoia wood and fastened with wrought iron brackets.

The design was first proposed by National Park Service architect Merel S. Sager in 1931, who designed a small log sign for the Ash Mountain entrance. In 1935 resident park landscape architect Harold G. Fowler created a much larger design. He recruited CCC worker George W. Muno, who had displayed a talent for woodworking, and they selected a piece of fallen sequoia wood from the Giant Forest. Fowler sketched the profile in blue chalk on the wood using an Indian Head nickel as a guide. Muno carved the wood over several months and the sign was assembled and erected over the winter of 1935–36. It was moved in 1964 to make room for a new park entrance station.

The sign is supported by a four-foot-diameter (1.2 m) sequoia log rising from a two-tiered masonry platform. The sign panel is ten feet (3.0 m) feet wide by four feet (1.2 m) high and one foot (0.30 m) thick, carved into a profile reputed to signify Sequoyah, whose Cherokee tribe never inhabited California. The sign was originally unpainted but assumed its present appearance in the 1950s. As originally built, a matching log pylon stood on the opposite side of the road. The pylon was removed when the sign was relocated.

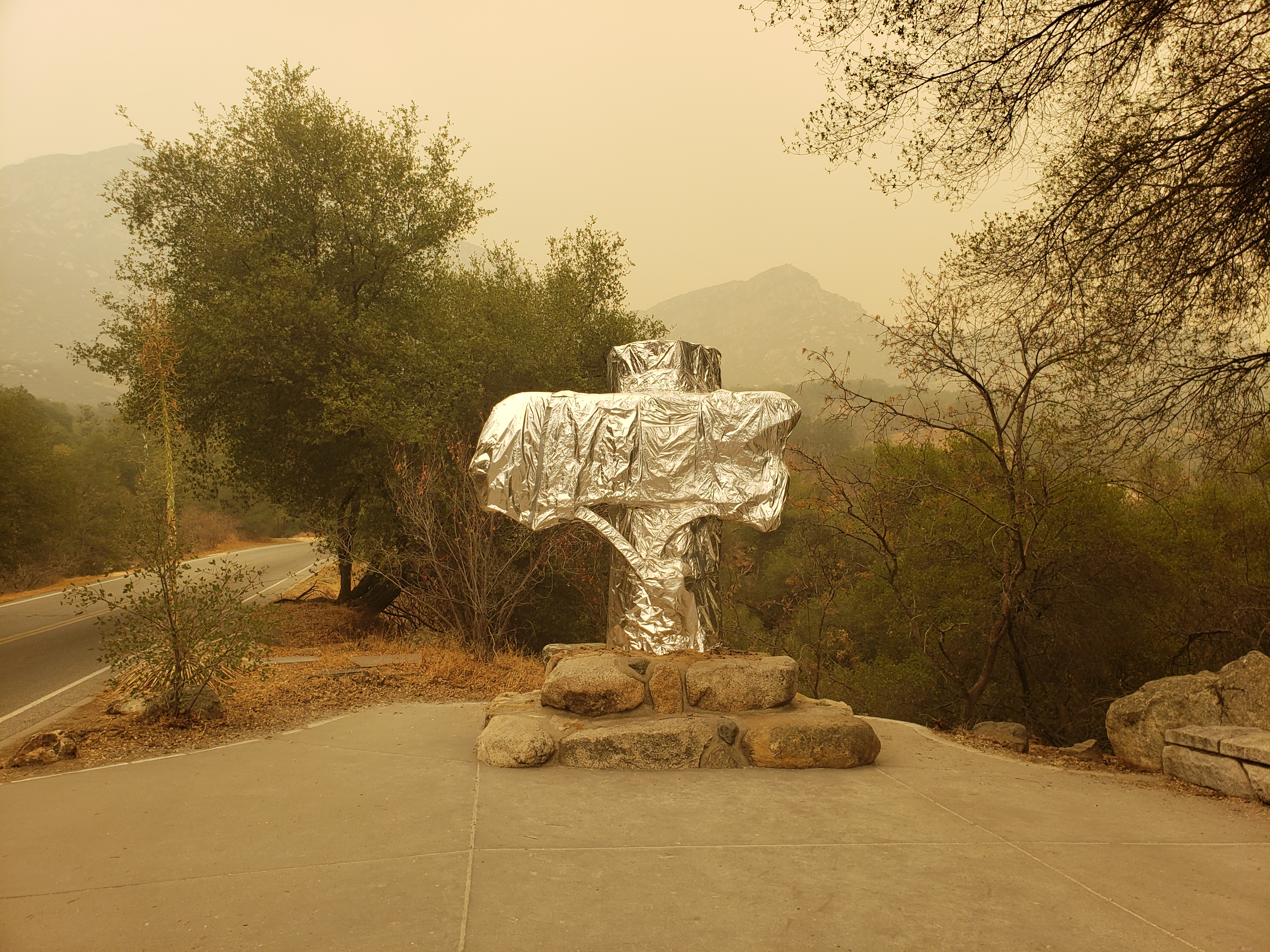
The Ash Mountain Entrance Sign, wrapped in protective foil during the approach of the KNP Complex Fire in 2021.

== See also ==
- East Entrance Sign (Zion National Park)
- South Entrance Sign (Zion National Park)
