= Tenalu =

Historic house in California, United States

- U.S. National Register of Historic Places
- Nearest city: Porterville, California
- Area: 130 acres (53 ha)
- Built: 1929
- Architect: Greene, Henry M.
- Architectural style: Arts & Crafts
- NRHP reference No.: 86002194
- Added to NRHP: September 4, 1986

Tenalu, also known as the Walter L. Richardson House, is a historic house in Porterville, California. The house is located on a ridge above citrus groves; its exact address is restricted. Built in 1929, the ranch house was designed by Henry Mather Greene; the home was the last significant building designed by Greene. The house has a U-shaped design with a central courtyard, a layout which had been previously used by Greene. Local materials were used to build the house; the walls were constructed with adobe from the hill the house sits atop, the rock used to build the chimney and foundation also came from the hill, and the sandstone used in the terrace came from the home site.

The house was added to the National Register of Historic Places on September 4, 1986.
