= Abraham Barton House =

- U.S. National Register of Historic Places
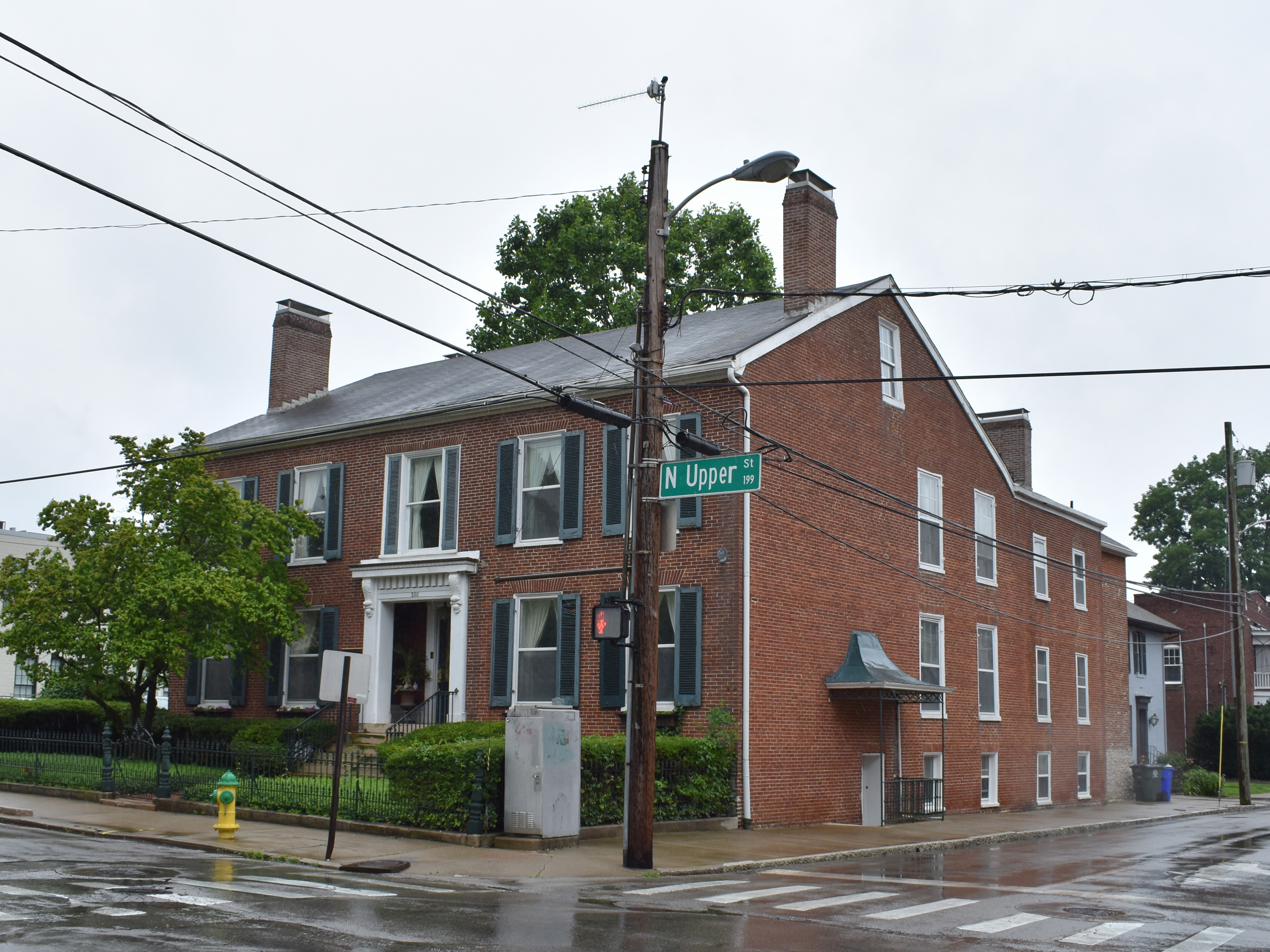
- The Abraham Barton House in 2019

- Location within Kentucky Location within the United States
- Location: 200 N. Upper St., Lexington, Kentucky
- Coordinates: 38°02′56″N 84°29′42″W
- Area: less than one acre
- Built: 1795
- Built by: Long, Samuel (1812)
- Architect: Shyrock, Gideon (1830s)
- Architectural style: Greek Revival, Late Victorian
- NRHP reference No.: 77000611
- Added to NRHP: August 26, 1977

The Abraham Barton House in Lexington, Kentucky, is a 2 1/2-story Greek Revival structure dating from 1795. The house was constructed in multiple stages, and the original dwelling faced Second Street. Architect Gideon Shryock is credited both for the Greek Revival expansion and remodel in the early 1830s and for changing the front exposure to face North Upper Street. The House was added to the National Register of Historic Places in 1977.

== History ==
The Barton House was constructed in 1795 for Peyton Short, a Lexington merchant, politician, and land speculator. In 1792 Short had developed 22 lots near what is now the Gratz Park Historic District, and his house was constructed within the development. Short sold the house in 1798 to George Caldwell, who leased it to James MacCoun. Caldwell sold the house in 1810 to Samuel Long, who leased it to George Ross. Long enlarged the house in 1812 and later sold it to Abraham Barton. When Barton died in 1824, his wife, Sarah (Hart) Barton, hired Gideon Shryock to renovate and expand the house.

Henry Brainerd McClellan later owned the house, and while there he wrote The Life and Campaigns of Major General J.E.B. Stuart, published by Houghton, Mifflin & Co. in 1885.

== Abraham S. Barton ==
Abraham Stout Barton was a merchant in Lexington. In 1805 he sold dry goods and hardware under the business name Abraham S. Barton & Co., and by 1810 Barton was a partner in the firm Hart, Barton & Hart. Barton also was employed as clerk of the Kentucky Insurance Co. and was a director of the Lexington branch of the Bank of the United States.
