= Montgomery County Courthouse =

Montgomery County Courthouse may refer to:

- Montgomery County Courthouse (Arkansas), Mount Ida, Arkansas
- Montgomery County Courthouse (Georgia), Mount Vernon, Georgia
- Montgomery County Courthouse (Iowa), Red Oak, Iowa
- Montgomery County Courthouse (Illinois), Hillsboro, Illinois
- Montgomery County Courthouse (Indiana), in Crawfordsville, Indiana, location of one of Indiana's public art works
- Montgomery County Courthouse (Kansas), a courthouse in Independence, Kansas
- Any of the Montgomery County Circuit Courthouses, Rockville, Maryland
- Montgomery County Courthouse (North Carolina), Troy, North Carolina
- Montgomery County Courthouse (Ohio), Dayton, Ohio
