= Jesse Hockett =

American sprint car racer

- Nationality: (United States) American
- Born: September 7, 1983 Kansas City, Missouri, U.S.
- Died: May 26, 2010 (aged 26) Warsaw, Missouri, U.S.

410 sprint cars
- Years active: 1998-2010
- Wins: 125

Jesse "The Rocket" Hockett (September 7, 1983 – May 26, 2010) was an American sprint car racer. He made his debut in 1998 and went on to win numerous events in the course of his career. In 2006, he became the O'Reilly Sprint Bandits TNT Midwest Swing Champion. He also competed in the World of Outlaws sprint car tour, having made his debut in the series in 2003.

Hockett was killed by electrocution while using a pair of pliers to fix his trailer's electrical box, and found by his wife, in his shop in Warsaw, Missouri in preparation for several races. He was survived by his wife Tina Marie Church-Hockett, after barely being married three months on February 13, 2010.
