= Groenfeldt Site =

Archaeological site in California, United States

- U.S. National Register of Historic Places
- Nearest city: Three Rivers, California
- Area: 0.2 acres (0.081 ha)
- NRHP reference No.: 78000288
- Added to NRHP: March 30, 1978

The Groenfeldt Site is an archaeological site located within Sequoia National Park near Three Rivers, California. The site is located in a remote and relatively inaccessible area of the park between General Grant Grove and the Giant Forest. The site contains a rock shelter from the late prehistoric era and had a "considerable" human presence according to the National Park Service.

The Groenfeldt Site was added to the National Register of Historic Places on March 30, 1978.
