= Barton Historic District =

- U.S. National Register of Historic Places
- U.S. Historic district
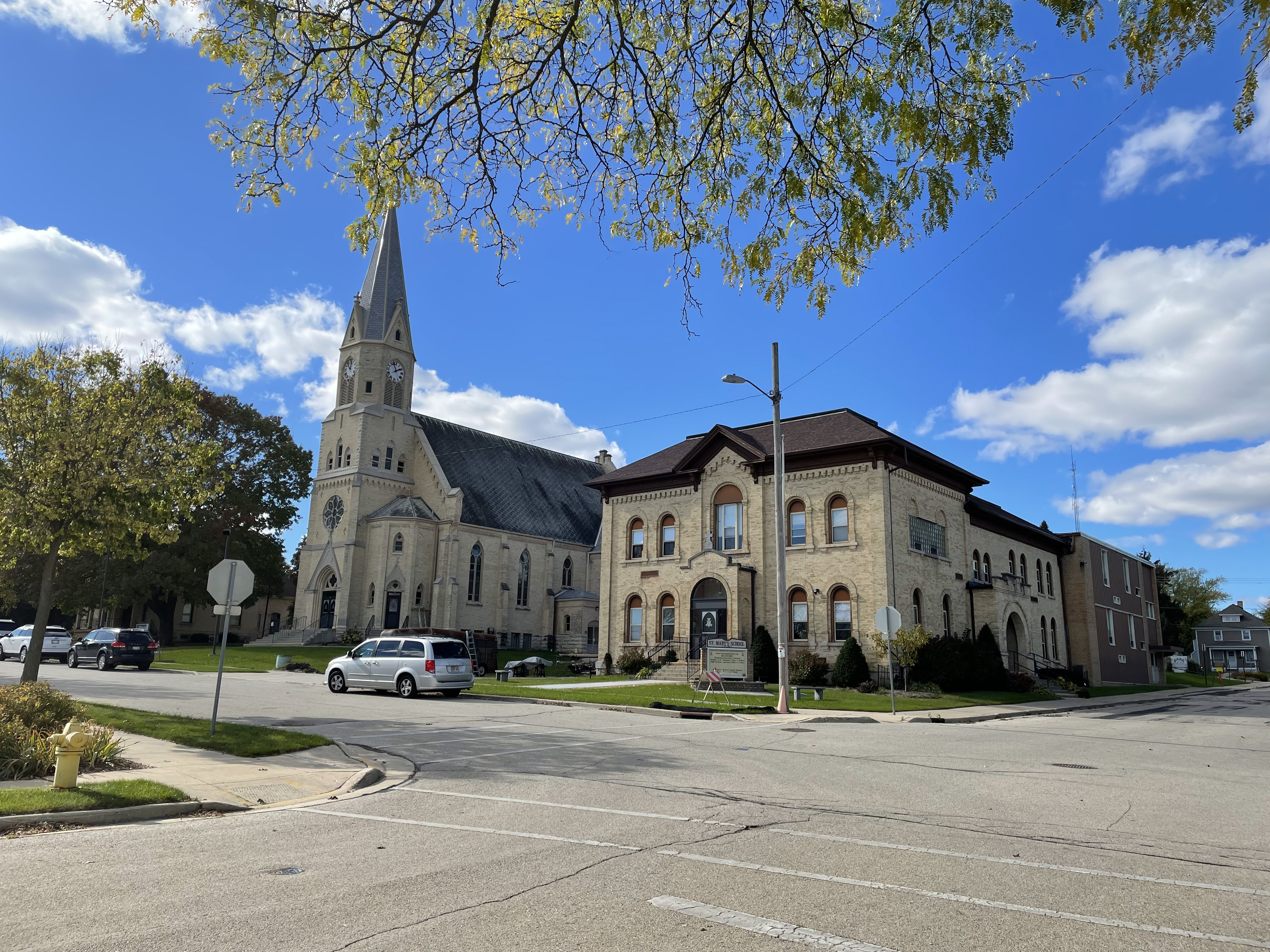
- St. Mary's Church and School

- Location within Wisconsin Location within the United States
- Location: Roughly bounded by Harrison and Jefferson Sts., Barton Ave., Salisbury Rd., Monroe St. and the Milwaukee R., West Bend, Wisconsin
- Coordinates: 43.4417°N 88.1819°W
- Area: 25 acres (10 ha)
- Architectural style: Bungalow/craftsman, Greek Revival, Italianate
- NRHP reference No.: 92000109
- Added to NRHP: March 5, 1992

The Barton Historic District is a historic district in West Bend, Wisconsin.

Now engulfed by West Bend, the modest former village of Barton retains survivors from its early frontier days. Includes the 1850 gabled-ell Hays-Raif house, the 1865 Barton Roller Mill, the 1865 Frazer General Store, the 1865 Greek Revival Frazer House, the 1900 Gothic Revival St Mary's church, the 1915 Barton Bank, the 1921 Ustruck bungalow, and the 1928 French Revival Kircher house.
