= Wuksachi Village =

- National park services village
- Interactive map of Wuksachi Village
- Coordinates: 36°36′32″N 118°45′10″W
- Country: United States
- State: California
- County: Tulare
- National Park: Sequoia
- Established: 1985
- Founder: National Park Service
  - Summer (DST): Pacific Standard Time (PCT)

Wuksachi Village is a visitor services development in Sequoia National Park, California. It was developed to replace the Giant Forest-Camp Kaweah development, which was regarded as being much too close to sensitive giant sequoia groves. Wuksachi Village is about 5 miles (8.0 km) north of the Giant Forest. It was originally proposed in the 1971 park master plan as the "Clover Creek-Willow Meadow" development, incorporating campgrounds as well as lodgings. Over time the campground feature was dropped. By 1980 the Clover Creek site was approved for development. Work involved a new maintenance facility at Red Fir and improvements to the existing Lodgepole campsite. Work began on Wuksachi Village in 1985 to build employee accommodations, a fire station and water and wastewater treatment facilities. Guest accommodations were built by concessioner Delaware North, opening in June 1999. There are three lodging units with a total of 102 rooms, with potential expansion to 414 rooms. The lodge buildings were designed by Clayton B. Wardel.

Wuksachi Village was named after the Wuksachi band of the Mono people who used the area on a seasonal basis before the area was settled. The facility is open all year and includes conference and meeting facilities.
