= Barton House (Florissant, Missouri) =

Historic house in Missouri, United States

- U.S. National Register of Historic Places
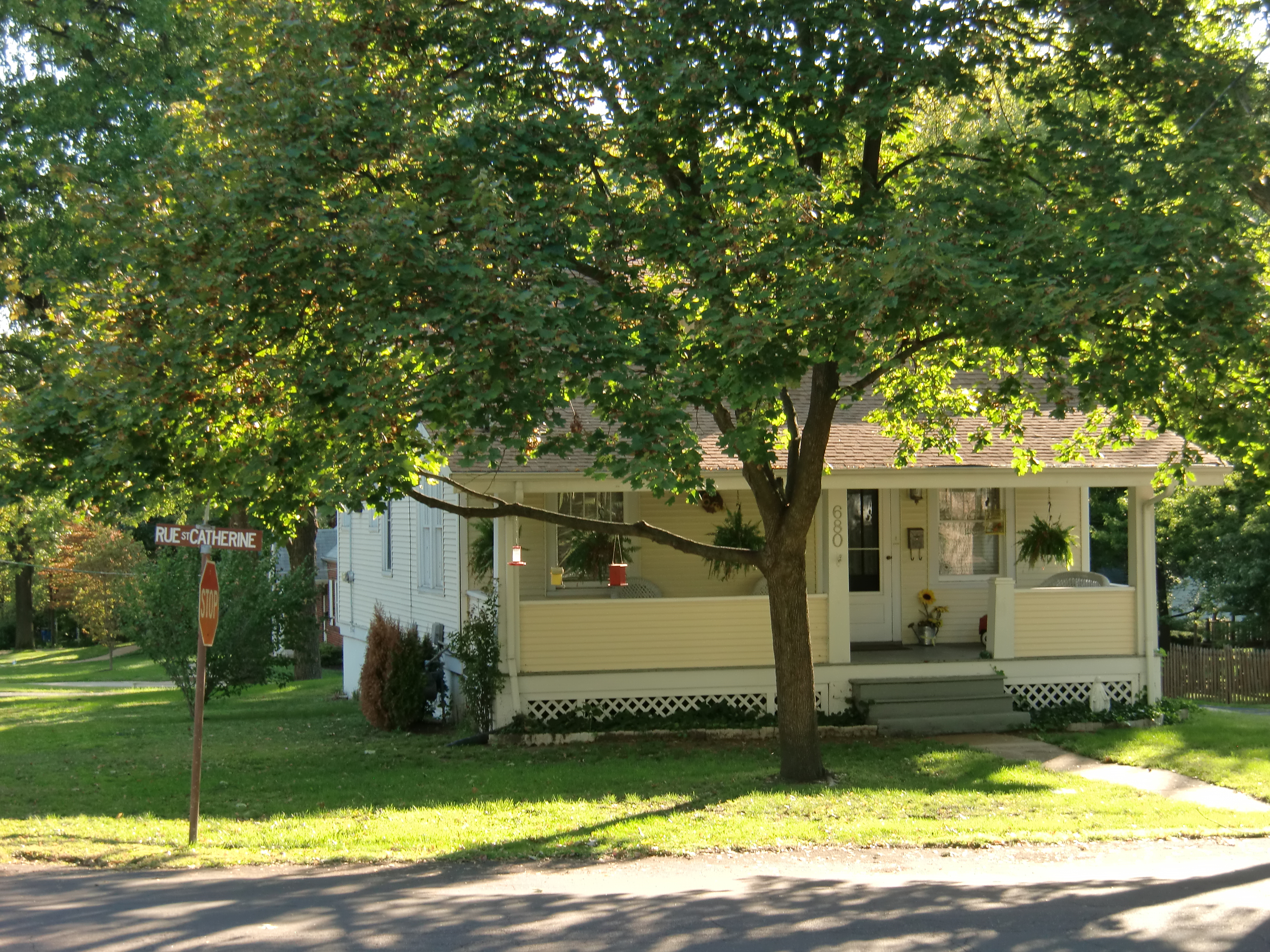

- Location within Missouri Location within the United States
- Location: 680 St. Catherine, Florissant, Missouri
- Coordinates: 38°47′30″N 90°19′36″W
- Built: 1923
- Architectural style: Missouri French
- MPS: St. Ferdinand City MRA
- NRHP reference No.: 79003650
- Added to NRHP: September 12, 1979

The Barton House in Florissant, Missouri is a "Missouri French" style house from 1923. It was listed on the National Register of Historic Places in 1979.

It is one of 16 houses in the City of St. Ferdinand which were described as "Missouri French" and listed together on the National Register in 1979, as part of a larger study of historic resources in the area.
