= Quinn Ranger Station =

- U.S. National Register of Historic Places
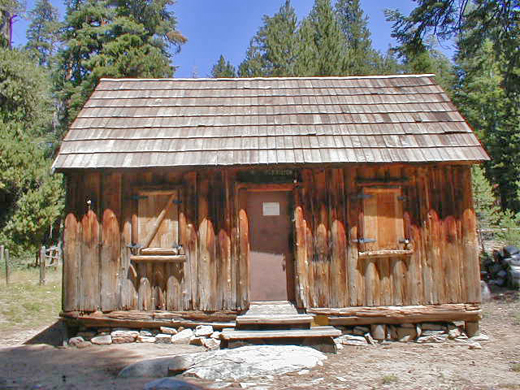

- Location within California Location within the United States
- Nearest city: Mineral King, California
- Coordinates: 36°19′29″N 118°34′33″W
- Built: 1907
- Architect: Harry Britten
- Architectural style: National Park Service Rustic
- NRHP reference No.: 77000118
- Added to NRHP: April 13, 1977

The Quinn Ranger Station, also known as the Quinn Patrol Cabin and Quinn's Horse Camp, is the only surviving ranger station from the time when Sequoia National Park was administered by the U.S. Army.

Sequoia was the second National Park to be established after Yellowstone National Park, and predated the establishment of the National Park Service. The one-room log cabin was built in 1907, in early National Park Service Rustic style.
