= William Montgomery House (Lancaster, Pennsylvania) =

Historic house in Pennsylvania, United States

- U.S. National Register of Historic Places
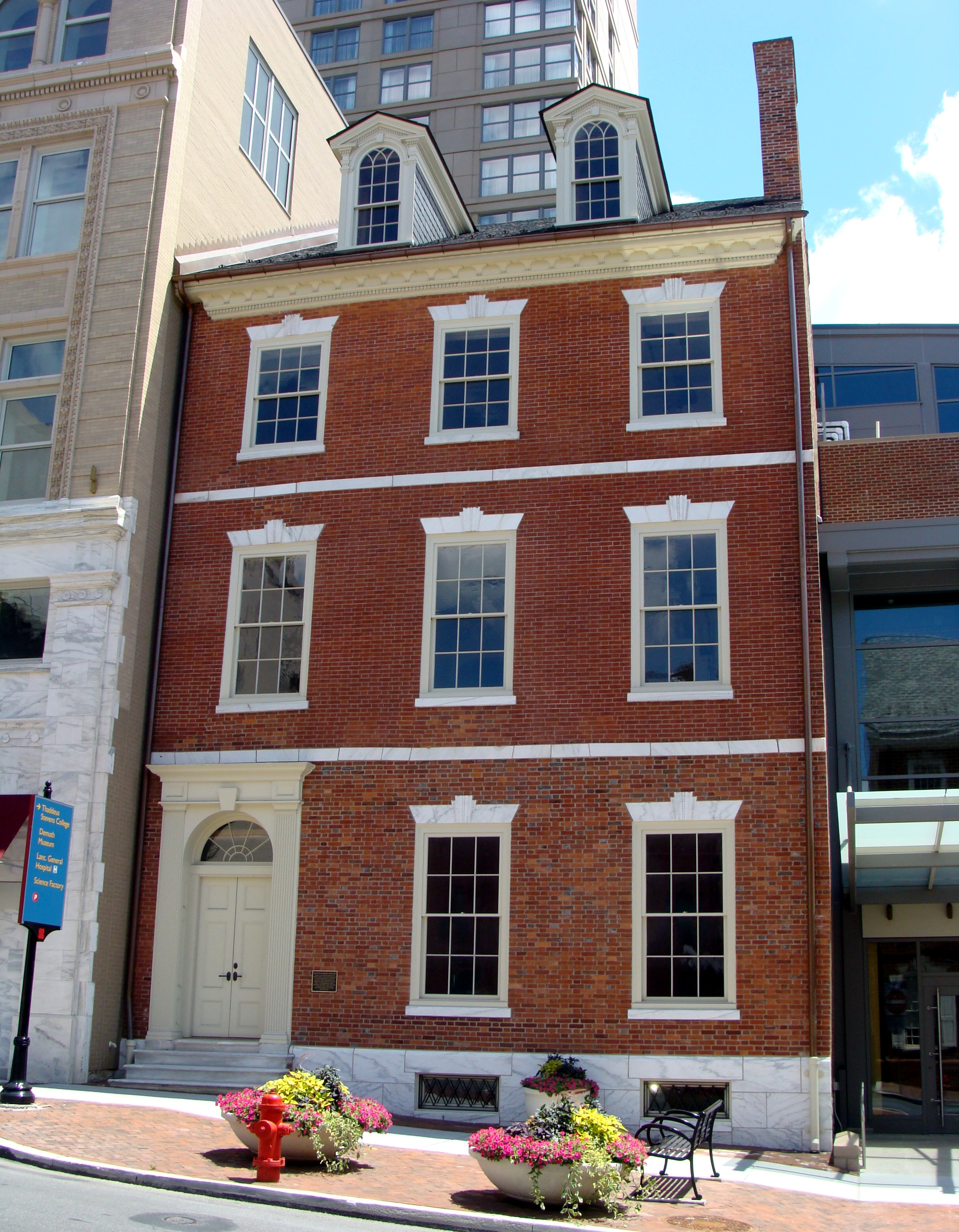
- Location: 19–21 South Queen Street, Lancaster, Pennsylvania
- Coordinates: 40°2′14″N 76°18′19″W
- Built: 1803
- Architect: Stephen Hills
- Architectural style: Federal
- NRHP reference No.: 00000519
- Added to NRHP: May 18, 2000

The William Montgomery House is an historic mansion on South Queen Street in Lancaster, Pennsylvania, United States. Built in 1803, it was listed on the National Register of Historic Places on May 18, 2000.

It has been recognized as one of the best Federal-style buildings in Lancaster.

== History ==
The William Montgomery House was designed by the architect Stephen Hills, who also designed the first Pennsylvania State Capitol building in 1803. It was owned by William Montgomery, a prominent, local attorney. Bought in 1960 by the next-door Watt & Shand department store, it was vacated after the store closed in 1995.

When the Lancaster County Convention Center was built during the late 2000s, the house was preserved externally and is a feature of the attached Lancaster Marriott's main lobby. In 2012, a project began to renovate the interior to convert it to high-end meeting spaces. The newly branded Montgomery Mansion is slated to open in November 2013.

== See also ==
- National Register of Historic Places listings in Lancaster, Pennsylvania

== Gallery ==
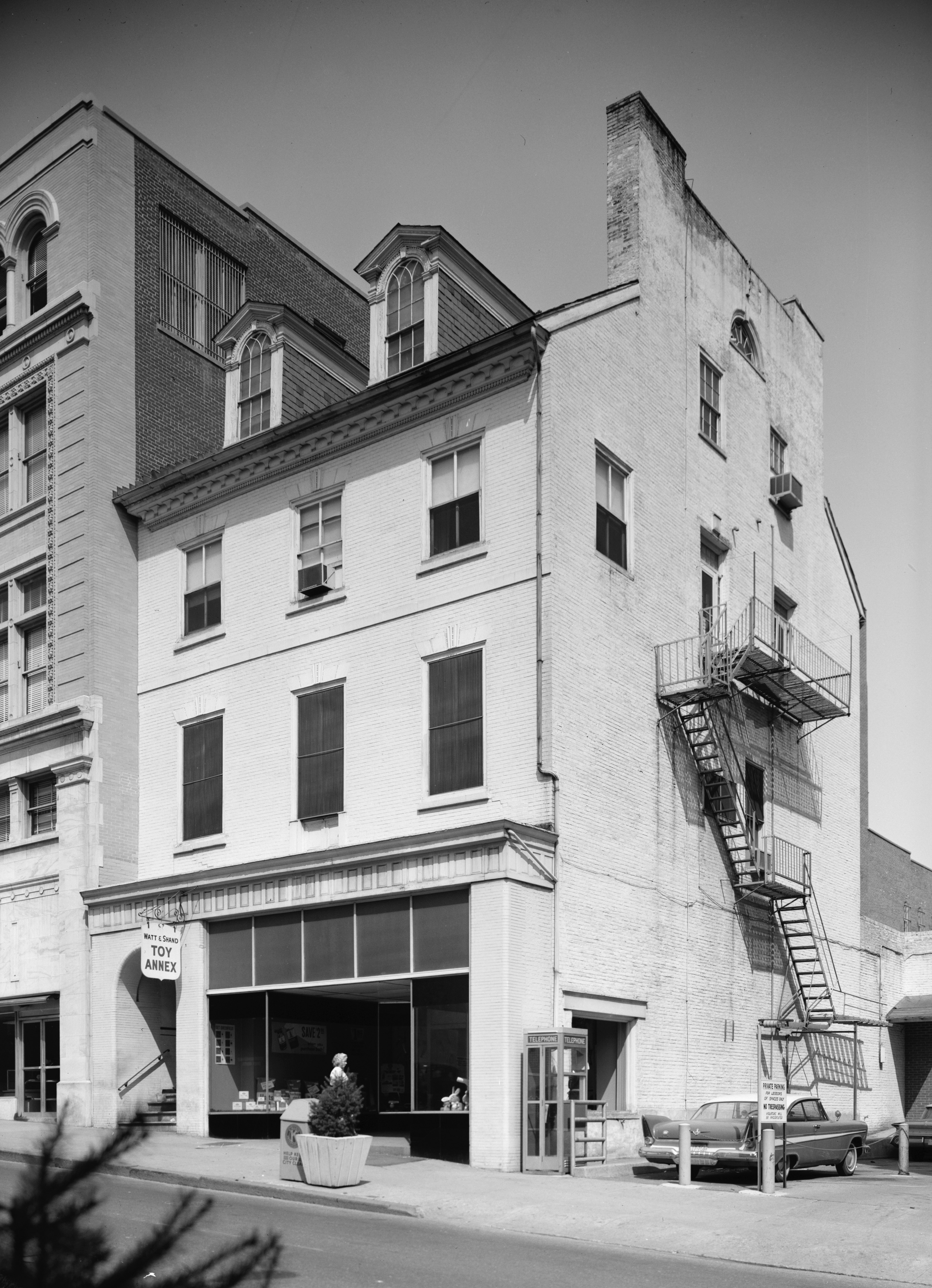
HABS photo of the house in 1965
