= Cabin Creek Ranger Residence and Dormitory =

- U.S. National Register of Historic Places
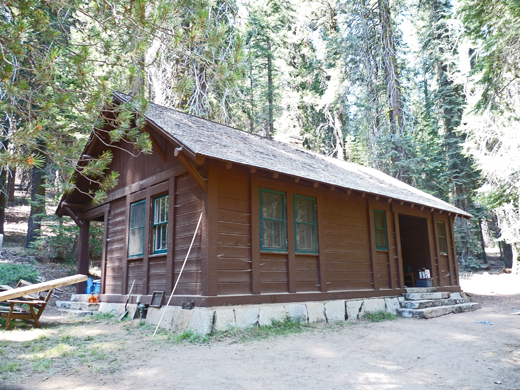
- Cabin Creek ranger residence

- Location within California Location within the United States
- Nearest city: Wilsonia, California
- Coordinates: 36°38′56″N 118°48′49″W
- Built: 1934
- Architect: National Park Service
- Architectural style: National Park Service Rustic
- NRHP reference No.: 78000368
- Added to NRHP: April 27, 1978

The Cabin Creek Ranger Residence and Dormitory, also known as the Cabin Creek Ranger Station, were built in 1934 and 1935 in Sequoia National Park by the Civilian Conservation Corps. The three-room wood-frame residence and the two-room dormitory are examples of the National Park Service Rustic style.

The two buildings stand close to the former site of the Lost Grove Entrance Station. They were built by CCC workers from the Buckeye CCC camp during the summers of 1934 and 1935, to house rangers for the Lost Grove entrance to the Generals Highway. Originally intended to be located at Lost Grove and to use sequoia logs, the move to nearby Cabin Creek resulted in a change to a wood appropriate to the new location, which did not feature sequoias. Design work for the buildings was carried out by Park Service landscape architect Harold G, Fowler and Emergency Conservation Work landscape architect Lloyd Fletcher.
