= Giant Forest Museum =

Museum in Sequoia National Park, California, United States

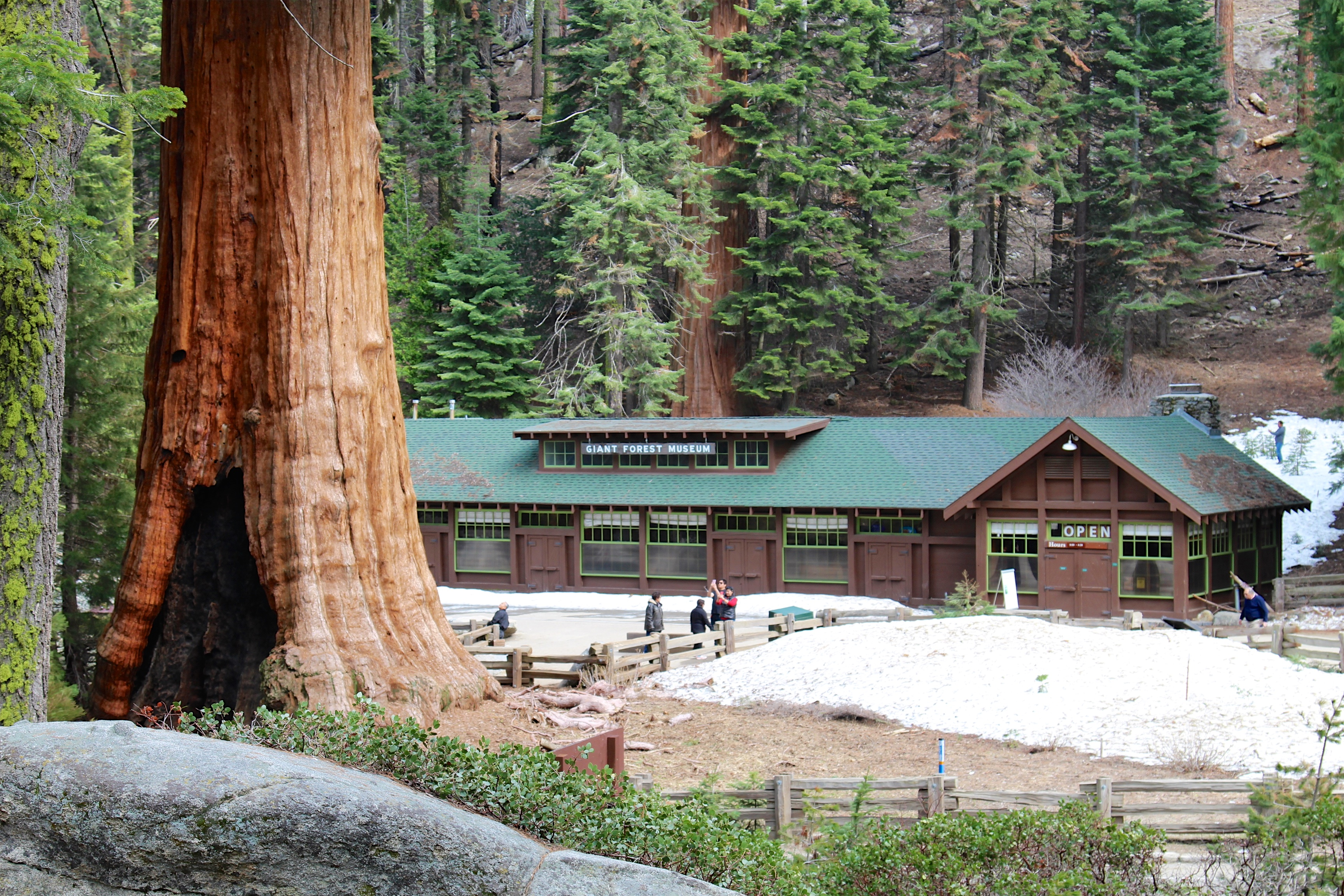
- Giant Forest Museum, and the Sentinel Tree
- Established: 2001
- Location: 47050 Generals Hwy, Three Rivers, CA 93271
- Coordinates: 36°33′53″N 118°46′22″W
- Type: National Park museum
- Website: Giant Forest Museum

The Giant Forest Museum is a museum, dedicated to the main features of the Giant Forest area of Sequoia National Park, including its giant sequoias, meadows, and also the human history of the area.

== History ==
The renovation of the market building of historic Giant Forest, started in 1999, and was completed to a museum and visitor center in summer 2001.

== Activities ==
At the museum and nearby, one can do the following:

- Learn how to identify the trees of the area;
- learn the difference between California coastal redwoods and giant sequoias;
- explore the natural history and ecology of Sequoia National Park via interactive exhibits;
- stroll around Round Meadow, an easy mile; and
- hike the Hazelwood areas and see the Hazelwood Tree.

== Management ==
The museum is managed by the National Park Service.

== See also ==
- List of giant sequoia groves
- List of largest giant sequoias
