= Pogue Hotel =

- U.S. National Register of Historic Places
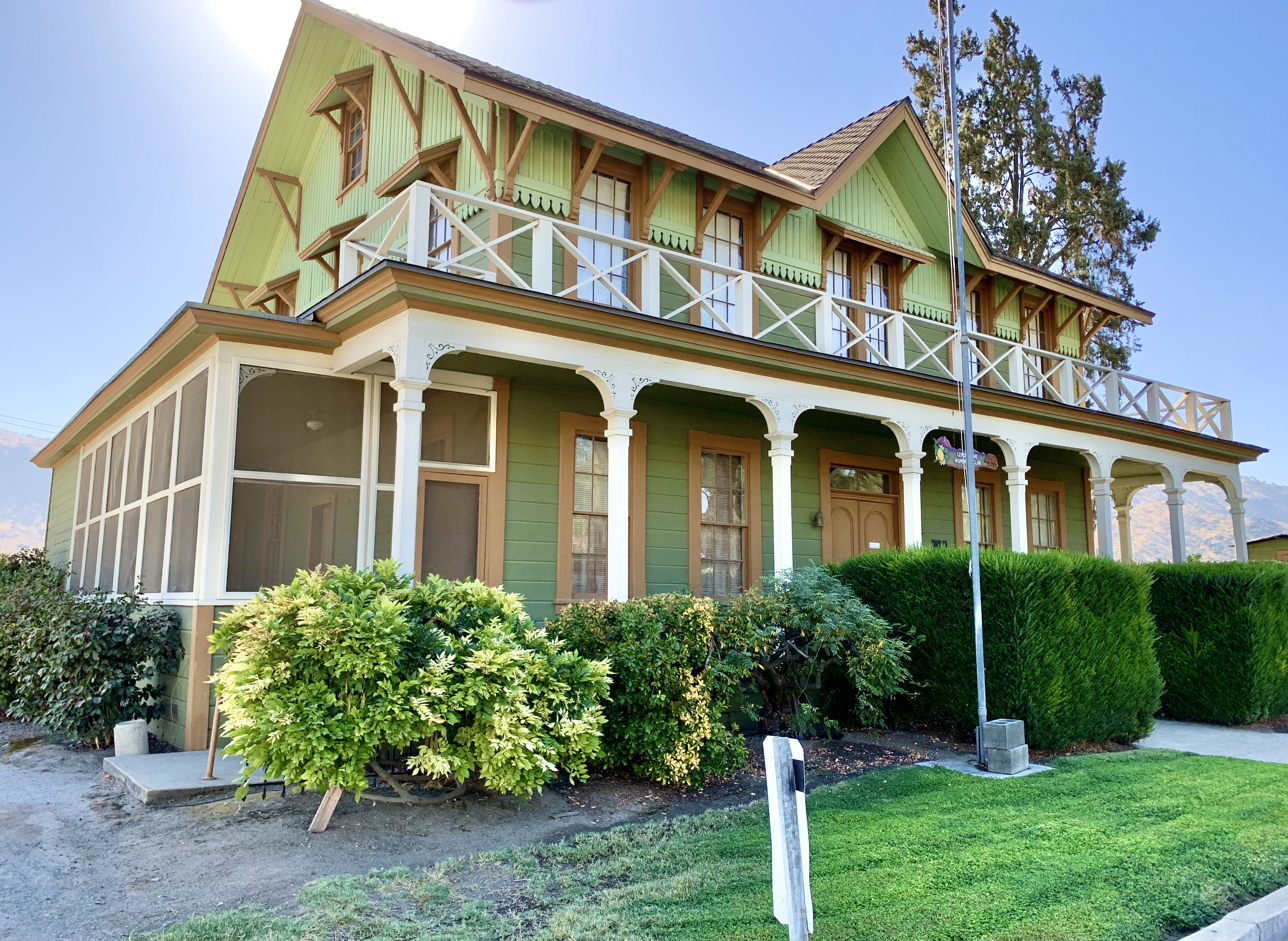

- Location within California Location within the United States
- Location: 32792 Sierra Dr. (CA 198), Lemon Cove, California
- Coordinates: 36°22′58″N 119°01′29″W
- Area: 0.3 acres (0.12 ha)
- Architectural style: Gothic, Stick/eastlake, Swiss
- NRHP reference No.: 91000927
- Added to NRHP: August 5, 1991

The Pogue Hotel, located at 32792 Sierra Dr. (CA SR 198), in Lemon Cove, California, is a historic building that was listed on the National Register of Historic Places in 1991. It has also been known as The Cottonwoods, as Montgomery House, and as the Lemon Cove Woman's Clubhouse.

It is historically significant as the home of James William Center Pogue (1839-1907), pioneer settler who built the hotel and lived there during 1880-98 and 1904–07. Pogue developed the lemon industry in Tulare County, and founded Lemon Cove, and served as a county supervisor.

The building served as a hotel for most of the period from 1879 to 1903. In 1904, Pogue's daughter Nora Alice Pogue acquired the hotel and converted it to a private residence. In 1936, the building became the clubhouse for the Lemon Cove Women's Club.
