= Hockett Meadow Ranger Station =

- U.S. National Register of Historic Places
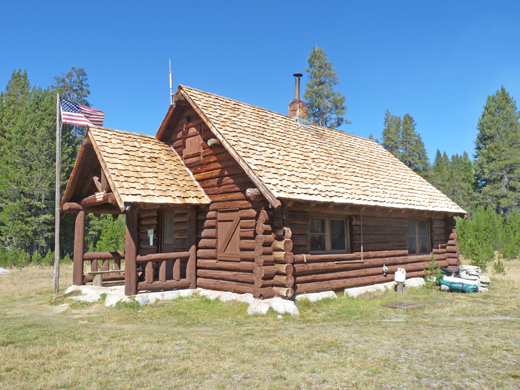

- Location within California Location within the United States
- Nearest city: Three Rivers, California
- Coordinates: 36°22′35.6658″N 118°39′20.4444″W
- Built: 1934
- NRHP reference No.: 78000369
- Added to NRHP: September 15, 1977

The Hockett Meadow Ranger Station was built in Sequoia National Park in 1934 by the Civilian Conservation Corps. The National Park Service Rustic building is a three-room log cabin in the extreme southern end of the park, near Mineral King.

The original Hockett Meadow Ranger Station was built in 1906 within 200 yards of the current station. Charlie Blossom was the first ranger to use the cabin, and did so from 1906 until his death in 1916. It was razed in 1969.
