= Giant Forest =

Giant Forest, Sequoiadendron giganteum, most accessible of all giant sequoia groves

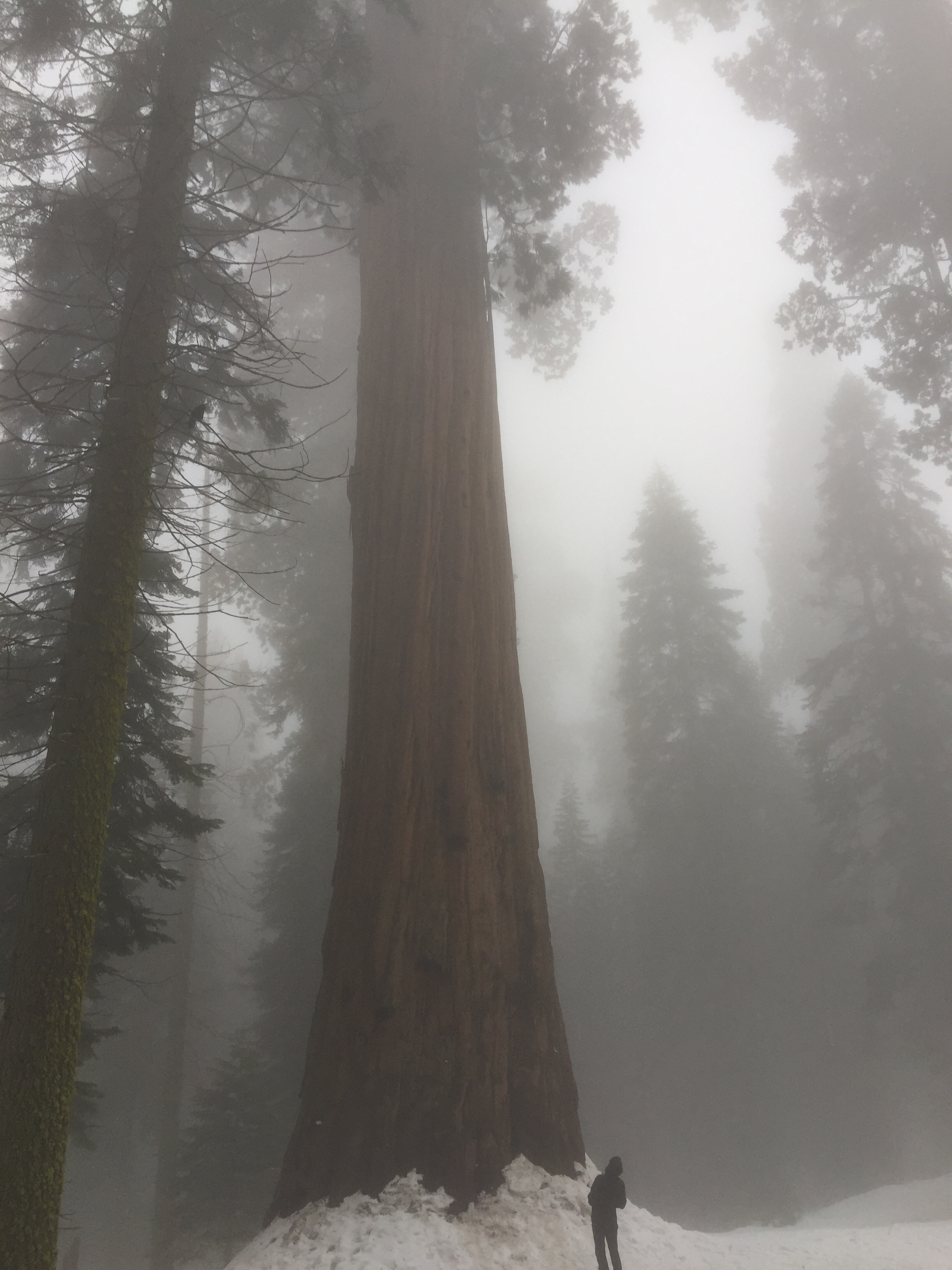
- Giant sequoia trees in the Giant Forest, March 2019

- Location within California

Geography
- Location: Sequoia National Park, California, United States
- Coordinates: 36°33′45″N 118°45′05″W
- Elevation: 6,990 feet (2,100 m)
- Area: 1,880 acres (7.6 km^{2})

Ecology
- WWF Classification: Sierra Nevada forests
- Dominant tree species: Sequoiadendron giganteum

The Giant Forest, famed for its giant sequoia trees, is within the United States' Sequoia National Park in California, United States. This montane forest, situated at over 6,000 ft (1,800 m) above mean sea level in the western Sierra Nevada, covers an area of 1,880 acres (7.6 km^{2}). The Giant Forest is the most accessible of all giant sequoia groves, as it has over 40 mi (64 km) of hiking trails.

Five of the ten most massive trees on Earth are located within the Giant Forest, contributing to its recognition as one of the most significant giant sequoia groves for both scientific study and public visitation. The General Sherman Tree is the largest known tree by volume. The giant sequoia is the world's most massive species of tree. It is also one of the six species known to exceed 300 ft (91 m) in height; the others are coast redwood, yellow meranti, Eucalyptus regnans, Douglas fir, and Sitka spruce. It is also among the longest-lived of all trees in the world.

In addition to its ecological significance, the forest has a long history shaped by Indigenous land stewardship, early conservation efforts, and modern management practices. Fire plays a critical role in maintaining the ecosystem, while ongoing threats such as climate change and increasing wildfire intensity continue to impact the forest.

To combat these ongoing challenges, the forest was historically protected by Indigeous peoples, such as the Western Mono and Tubatulabal tribes, and later by the Buffalo American Soldiers for a time.

== The Area ==
Giant Forest is close to Crystal Cave, Moro Rock and Crescent Meadow. The western trailhead of the High Sierra Trail which crosses the Sierra Nevada to Mount Whitney is at the Crescent Meadow parking area.

Ponderosa, Jeffrey, Sugar, and Lodgepole pine trees are common here, as well as white and red fir. Visitors often see mule deer, Douglas squirrel, and American black bear. The National Park Service advises visitors not to leave any food in unattended vehicles, as bears may break in to obtain it.

Giant Forest is also notable for its large water-storing fen meadows, including Round Meadow, Crescent Meadow and Circle Meadow, which contribute to the ecological diversity of the area.

== Fire Ecology and Management ==
Fire is a fundamental ecological process in the Giant Forest and is central to ongoing conservation and management practices. Giant sequoias depend on periodic low-intensity fires for reproduction, since heat helps open their cones and prepares the soil for seed germination. Historically, fire occurred as frequent, low-intensity surface fires that helped keep the forest more open and supported biodiversity.

During much of the 20th century, fire suppression policies disrupted this cycle, which lead to increased fuel buildup and a higher risk of more severe wildfires. Today, the National Park Service uses prescribed burns and managed wildfires to restore natural fire conditions and reduce long-term ecological risk.

== Giant Forest Village ==
The giant sequoia trees are first encountered on the approach from the south at Giant Forest Village, a small cluster of buildings surrounded by the forest. Some of the sequoias became unstable due to root damage caused by earlier development, emphasizing the long-term ecological impacts of infrastructure within the grove. As a result, many services were relocated to Wuksachi Village, approximately 7 miles (11 km) north.

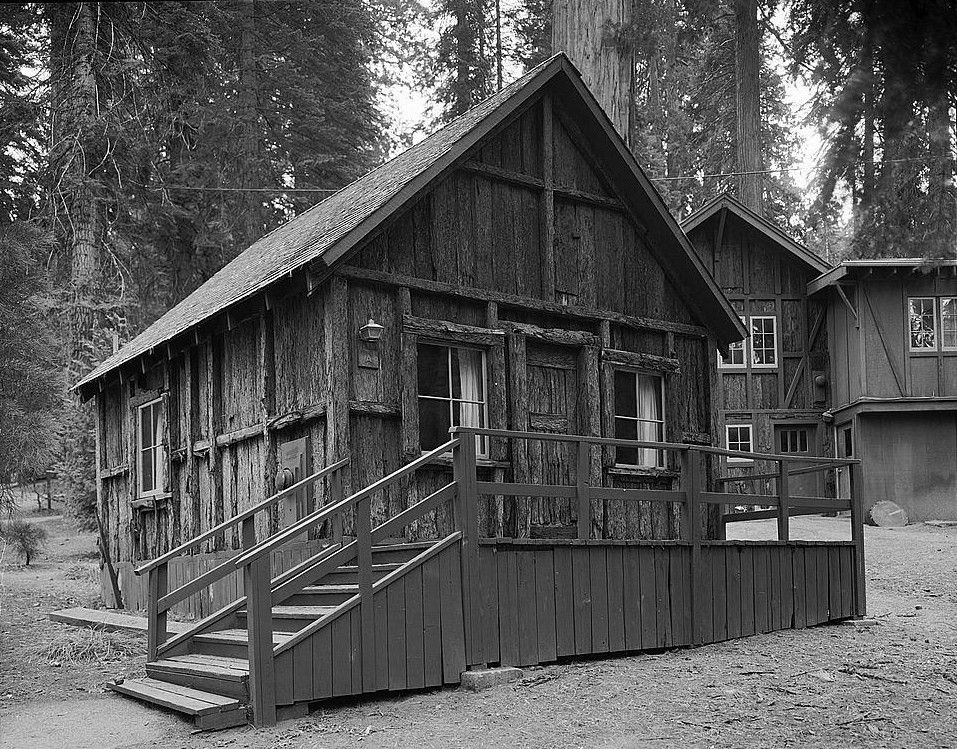
Former Cabin A at Giant Village Lodge, Sequoia National Park, California, USA (demolished)

Once the home of nearly 300 buildings, the region now has four, with no commercial activity. It is a designated "day use" area. The Giant Forest Lodge Historic District was designated in 1978, encompassing the main area of development in the Giant Forest grove. The development was demolished between 1995 and 2000, with day use features moving to the nearby Giant Forest Village–Camp Kaweah Historic District, which was itself extensively altered, and overnight visitor services moving to Wuksachi Village.

The area within the grove was restored to nearly natural conditions, allowing the use of fire for forest management and the germination of new sequoia seedlings. Frequent low-intensity fires have historically played a critical role in maintaining the Giant Forest ecosystem by reducing fuel buildup and promoting giant sequoia regeneration.

The sequoia forest extends primarily east of the village and is accessed by a three-mile (4.8 km) side road along with a network of interconnected trails, ranging from one to five miles (1.6 to 8.0 km) in length. These trails provide access to notable trees and areas within the forest.

The area is generally sheltered and receives relatively high precipitation, which contributes to the growth of large sequoias. These conditions also support seasonal mosquito populations. The terrain is mostly level and shaded, making it accessible for visitors.

== History ==
Before the creation of the park, many indigenous peoples resided in the area. The main two were the Western Mono and Tubatulabal tribes along with the Yokuts and Owens Valley Pauite, who lived close enough to the area to trade. The people took care of the forest especially when it came to fire management. Indigenous cultural burns helped to clear away dead brush and promote new growth, which reduced the intensity of wildfires that could destroy the Sequoias. However, many of the tribes were forced from their land when settlers came to develop the area for logging and the government banned their cultural burning in 1850

Sequoia National Park was created in 1890 by Benjamin Harris, making it the second national park in the United States. While this was intended to protect the giant trees, human activities like the building of infrastructure negatively impacted them and the surrounding area. A limit on development was later placed on the park to avoid too much more of this. Protection of the area was passed from the indigenous peoples to soldiers and then to civilians, who have protected it as park rangers since.

== Buffalo American Soldiers ==
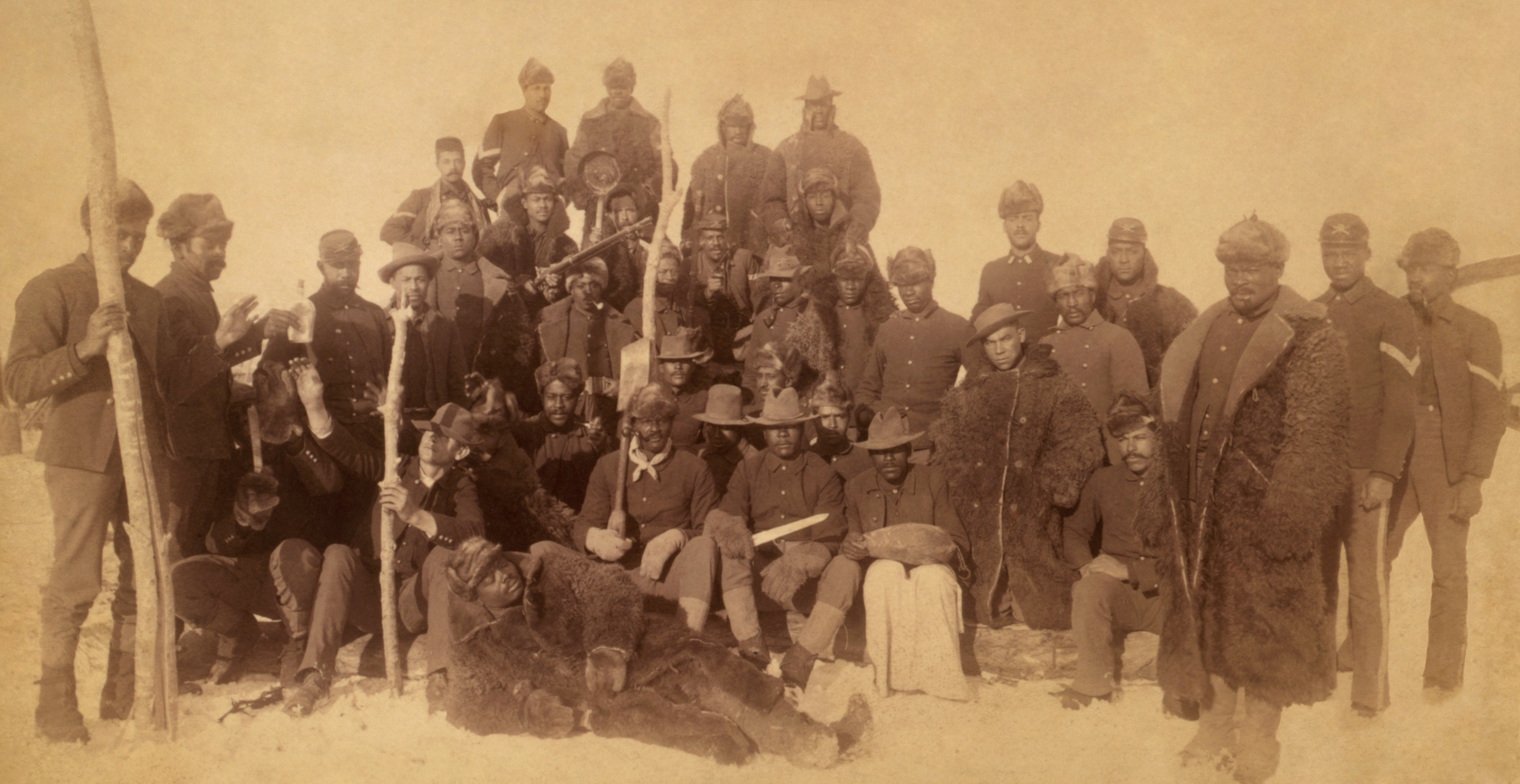
Buffalo American Soldiers

The Buffalo American Soldiers were a group of men who were sent to protect Sequoia National Park from 1891-1913 when WWI needed their service. This group was unusual for the time because it included both white and black soldiers working together for a common goal. Their challenges included combatting logging, poaching and wildfires, as well as conflicts with the Indigenous peoples. They creatively overcame these and also built a significant portion of the park infrastructure including the first road into the park, trails and an arboretum.

A significant figure was Charles Young, the first black military officer, tasked with leading this group of Buffalo American Soldiers. He was dedicated to conservation and later had a tree named after him.

== Environmental Threats ==
The Giant Forest faces increasing environmental pressures, particularly due to its sensitivity to changes in climate and hydrology. Rising temperatures, earlier snowmelt, and more frequent drought conditions have affected the forest ecosystem and contributed to increased stress on giant sequoias.

Drought has become a growing concern, as giant sequoias rely heavily on consistent water availability. During extended dry periods, trees can experience water stress that limits their ability to transport moisture and maintain normal growth. This can make them more vulnerable to long-term decline and other environmental pressures.

== Access ==
The forest can be reached from Fresno by State Route 180 or from Visalia by State Route 198. The Generals' Highway connects Giant Forest to Kings Canyon National Park and the General Grant Grove, home to the General Grant tree among other giant sequoias.

== Noteworthy Trees ==
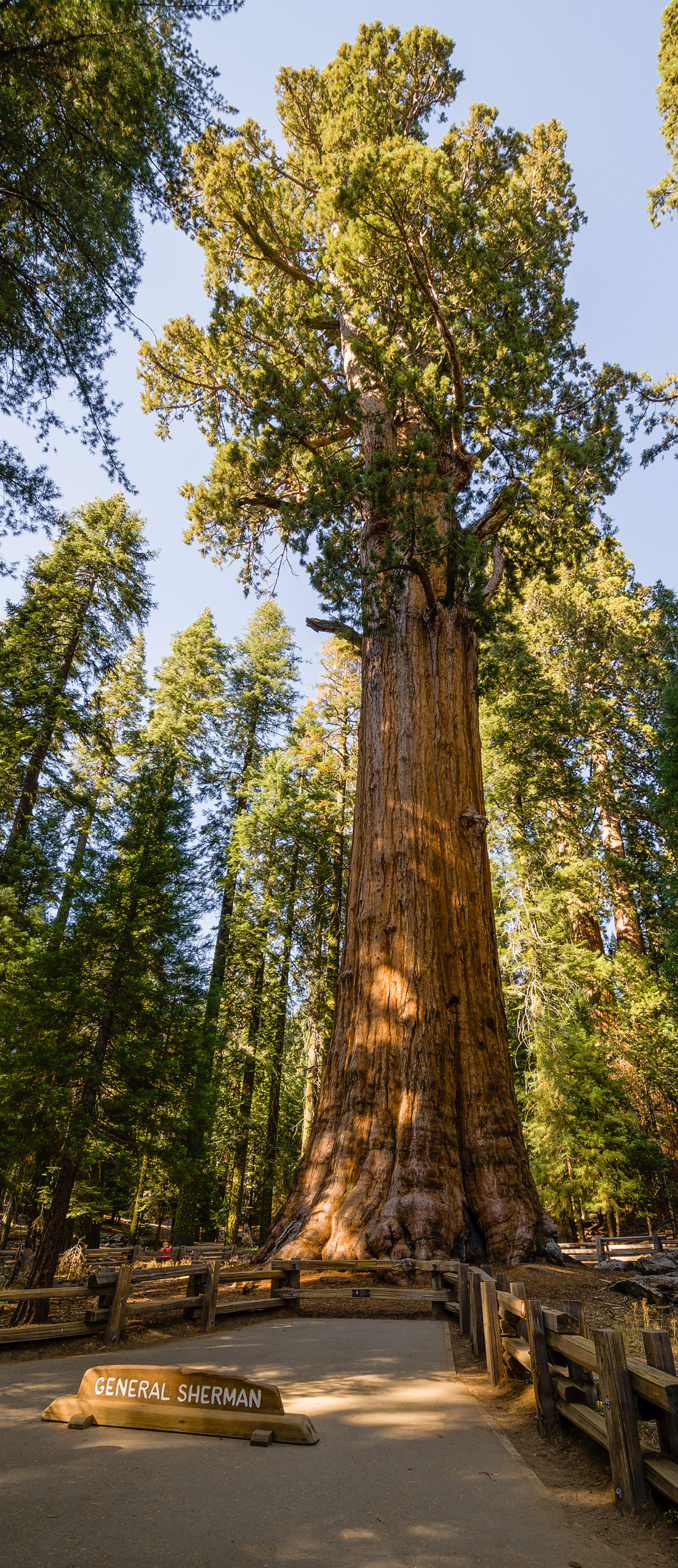
General Sherman, the most massive tree in the world

Some of the trees found in the grove that are worthy of special note are:

- Adams Tree: From about 90 feet (27 m) up, the trunk is very irregular with many limb buttresses and much foliage. The top is a maze of limbs.
- Booker T. Washington Tree: A large giant sequoia associated with the history of the Buffalo Soldiers in Sequoia Nation Park. It was named in honor of Booker T. Washington, an African American educator and leader, recognizing the contributions of African American soldiers to early park conservation efforts.
- Brigadier General Charles Young Tree: Dedicated in 2004 to the Buffalo American Soldier, Charles Young. It stands near the Booker T. Washington Tree.
- Chief Sequoyah: Just uphill from the President tree is the massive and very impressive Chief Sequoyah. This tree is one of the most strikingly rugged trees in the forest.
- Cleveland Tree: One of the 40 largest giant sequoias.
- Column Tree: About 100 yards (91 m) from the General Pershing is another large sequoia. Its lack of taper makes it the fourteenth-largest giant sequoia.
- Congress Group: a grove (36.57281°N 118.74961°W), located between the General Sherman Tree and the Giant Forest Museum, and further divided into The House and The Senate. The Congress Grove is near The President tree. It was in 1922, that Colonel John R. White, the superintendent of Sequoia National Park, named the Senate trees to honor the United States Senate. On the Congress Trail, an easy hike of 2 miles (3.2 km) stroll takes you to The Senate. A short additional distance will add other prominent sequoias.
- Ed by Ned: A pair of intertwined giant sequoia trees located at the southern end of Round Meadow; also known as the "Uncle Ned Tree".
- Franklin: Although it is the eighth-largest tree in the world, this tree has been largely ignored, perhaps because it is in such a massive grove with many other large specimens. This tree has a huge fire scar on one side and a very large diameter.
- General Pershing: The lower trunk is massive and the top is a tapering dead snag.
- General Sherman: In 1931 this tree was established to be the largest living thing in the world and, therefore, also the largest tree in the world. It has a volume of 52,508 cubic feet (1,486.9 cubic meters). The top of the Sherman is a dead limb that at one time served as a leader branch. Its largest limb is around 7 feet (2.1 m) in diameter. The second-largest tree in the world, the General Grant, is located about 27 miles away in Kings Canyon National Park.
- Hamilton: A large tree with a volume of 32,783 cubic feet (928.3 cubic meters).
- Hazelwood Tree: A large tree that, although reduced by half due to lightning damage sustained in 2002, is still alive.
- Lincoln: This is the fourth-largest tree at 44,471 cubic feet (1,259.3 cubic meters).
- Monroe: The tenth-largest tree in the world.
- Near Ed by Ned: Another tree with an impressive lower trunk, it was measured in 1997 at a volume of 30,333 cubic feet (858.9 cubic meters). The tree is located 46 m (151 ft) north of Ed by Ned, hence the name.
- The President: Recent measurements by arborists who climbed up into the crown of the tree and rappelled down through the limbs have discovered that The President tree is actually bigger than the General Grant tree and is even beginning to rival the General Sherman Tree as the world's largest.
- Washington tree: Once the second-largest tree in the world, the Washington tree underwent a significant transformation following a lightning strike in September 2003 and a partial collapse under heavy snow in January 2005. These events reduced its height from over 250 feet (76 m) to approximately 115 feet (35 m). While it has lost more than half of its trunk and most of its brances, the tree remains alive. As of 2026, it is ranked the 23rd largest tree in Sequoia National Park and continues to show signs of recovery with new foliage growth on its remaining limbs.
- Unnamed Tree: A nameless but unusually tall tree, measured from two different angles to be 303.4 feet (92.5 m) tall. With a diameter of 19.5 feet (5.9 m) at breast height and a volume probably around 30,000 cubic feet (850 cubic meters), it is the largest-known sequoia to exceed 300 feet (91 m).

== See Also ==
- List of largest giant sequoias
- List of giant sequoia groves
- List of individual trees
- Washington (tree)
