= Barton–Lackey Cabin =

Historic house in California, United States

- U.S. National Register of Historic Places
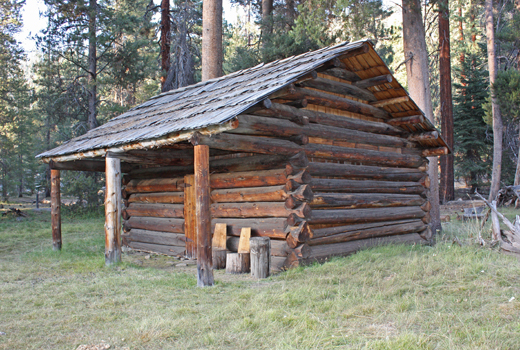

- Location within California Location within the United States
- Coordinates: 36°42′46″N 118°34′59″W
- Built: 1910
- Architect: H. D. & J. D. Barton
- NRHP reference No.: 78000290
- Added to NRHP: March 30, 1978

The Barton–Lackey Cabin, also known as the Barton Cattle Camp and the Lackey Cattle Camp, was built in 1910 in the Roaring River Canyon of what became Kings Canyon National Park in California. The cabin was a shelter for stockmen using the summer range in the upper Kings River Canyon summer range, at an elevation of 7400 feet. The cabin was once surrounded by a significant number of outbuildings, which have all disappeared.

James DeCamp Barton and his father, Hudson DeCamp Barton first used summer pasturage in the upper Roaring River area about 1907. Their home range was in the Sierra Nevada foothills near Auckland, California. About 1910 they built the cabin at Scaffold Meadow. In the early 1920s H.D. Barton's daughter Sylvia married Al Lackey, a forest ranger. Taking over the family cattle operation, Lackey used the Roaring River range until the establishment of Kings Canyon National Park in 1940. Lackey received a lifetime use permit from the National Park Service that continued until two years after Mrs. J.D. Barton's death in 1956. The cabin was used as a storage shed by the Park Service from that time.

The property was placed on the National Register of Historic Places in 1977 for its significance in local ranching and settlement.
