= Wilsonia, California =

- census-designated place
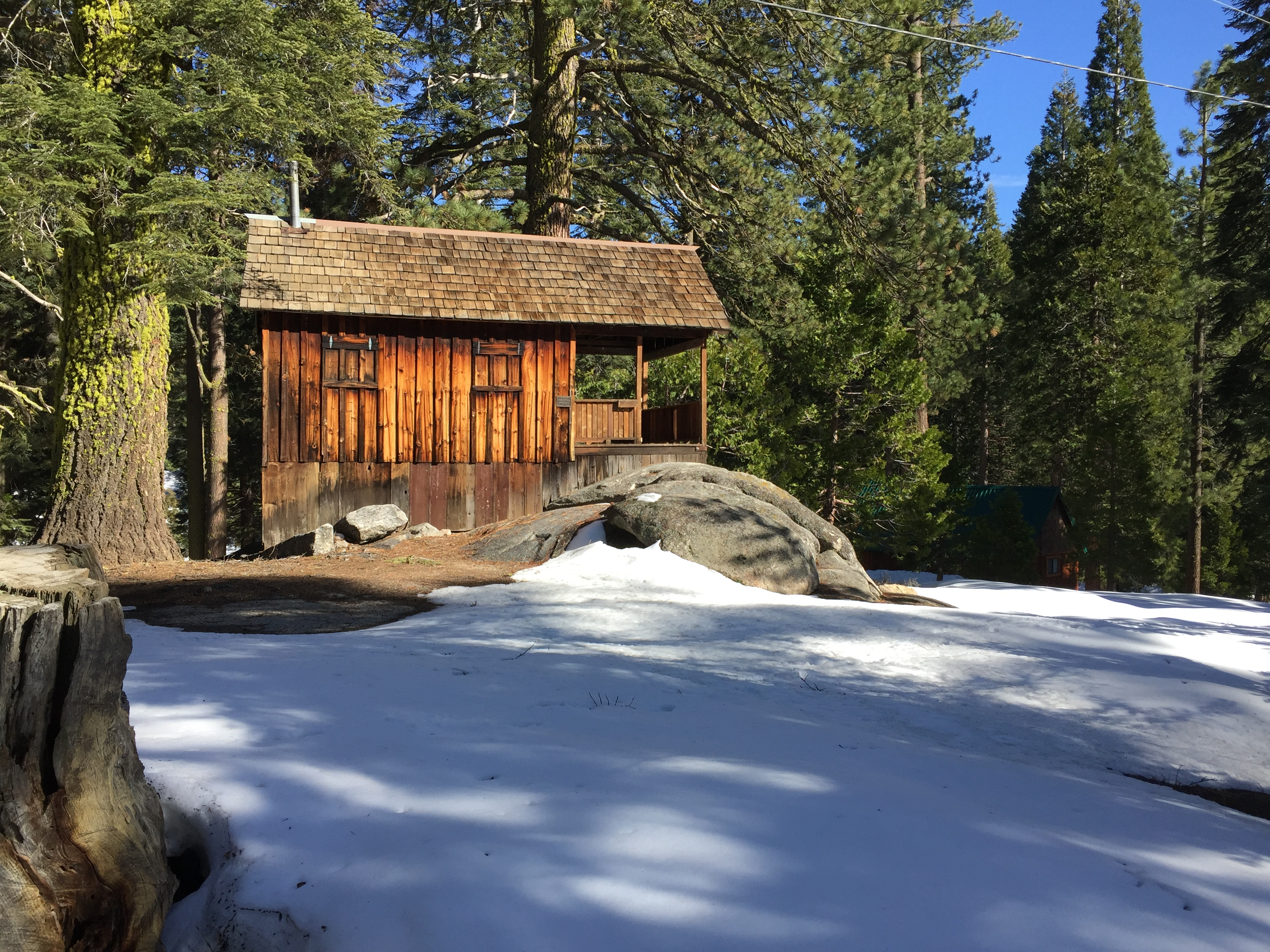
- A historic cabin in Wilsonia, California.

- Location in Tulare County and the state of California

- Position in California.
- Coordinates: 36°44′05″N 118°57′21″W
- Country: United States
- State: California
- County: Tulare

Area
  - Total: 0.273 sq mi (0.706 km^{2})
  - Land: 0.273 sq mi (0.706 km^{2})
  - Water: 0 sq mi (0 km^{2}) 0%
- Elevation: 6,617 ft (2,017 m)

Population (2020)
  - Total: 14
  - Density: 51/sq mi (20/km^{2})
- Time zone: UTC-8 (Pacific (PST))
  - Summer (DST): UTC-7 (PDT)
- GNIS feature ID: 2585464

Wilsonia is a census-designated place (CDP) in Tulare County, California, United States. As of the 2020 census, Wilsonia had a population of 14. Wilsonia sits at an elevation of 6,617 feet (2,017 m). It is surrounded by the General Grant Grove section of Kings Canyon National Park.

== History ==
The community of Wilsonia began as a 100-acre plot of land homesteaded in the 1870s. After several ownership changes, the land was subdivided among residents. The village was officially established in 1918.

The name “Wilsonia” originates from the United States presidential election of 1916. The outcome of the election was decided by votes from the mountain communities of California, which were delayed due to a snowstorm. To commemorate the area's decisive role in President Woodrow Wilson’s reelection, the community was named Wilsonia in his honor.

== Geography ==
According to the United States Census Bureau, the CDP covers an area of 0.3 square mile (0.7 km^{2}), all land.

While the village is surrounded by Kings Canyon National Park, the village itself is not part of the National Park, and most of the land within Wilsonia is privately owned. Over 200 cabins are located in the village, many of which are summer residences and vacation homes. The 2010 census placed the permanent population of Wilsonia at five residents.

== Wilsonia Historic District ==
The entire community of Wilsonia was listed on the National Register of Historic Places in 1996. The U.S. Historic district includes 139 contributing historic structures.

== Demographics ==
Historical population
Census	Pop.	Note	%±
2010	5		—
2020	14		180.0%
U.S. Decennial Census; 1850–1870 1880-1890; 1900 1910 1920; 1930 1940 1950; 1960 1970 1980; 1990 2000 2010

Wilsonia first appeared as a census designated place in the 2010 U.S. census.

Wilsonia CDP, California – Racial and ethnic composition Note: the US Census treats Hispanic/Latino as an ethnic category. This table excludes Latinos from the racial categories and assigns them to a separate category. Hispanics/Latinos may be of any race.
Race / Ethnicity (NH = Non-Hispanic)	Pop 2010	Pop 2020	% 2010	% 2020
White alone (NH)	5	13	100.00%	92.86%
Black or African American alone (NH)	0	0	0.00%	0.00%
Native American or Alaska Native alone (NH)	0	0	0.00%	0.00%
Asian alone (NH)	0	0	0.00%	0.00%
Native Hawaiian or Pacific Islander alone (NH)	0	0	0.00%	0.00%
Other race alone (NH)	0	1	0.00%	7.14%
Mixed race or Multiracial (NH)	0	0	0.00%	0.00%
Hispanic or Latino (any race)	0	0	0.00%	0.00%
Total	5	14	100.00%	100.00%
