= National Register of Historic Places listings in Rocky Mountain National Park =

This is a complete list of the properties and districts on the National Register of Historic Places in Rocky Mountain National Park, Colorado, United States. The locations of National Register properties and districts for which the latitude and longitude coordinates are included below, may be seen in a map.

There are 49 properties and districts listed on the National Register in the park, one of which is a National Historic Landmark.

This National Park Service list is complete through NPS recent listings posted November 13, 2025.

== Current listings ==
	Name on the Register	Image	Date listed	Location	City or town	Description
1	Bear Lake Comfort Station	Bear Lake Comfort Station	January 29, 1988 (#87001137)	Bear Lake; 40°18′44″N 105°38′42″W	Estes Park	
2	Cascade Cottages	Cascade Cottages	August 27, 2020 (#100005475)	Fall River Road; 40°24′05″N 105°36′10″W	Estes Park	
3	Dutchtown		January 29, 1988 (#76002292)	Ditch Rd. 40°26′16″N 105°52′55″W	Grand Lake	
4	East Inlet Trail	East Inlet Trail	February 28, 2005 (#05000073)	Rocky Mountain National Park; 39°54′37″N 105°44′30″W	Estes Park	
5	East Longs Peak Trail	East Longs Peak Trail	July 10, 2007 (#07000740)	West of State Highway 7; 40°16′20″N 105°36′2″W; 40°16′20″N 105°36′02″W	Allenspark	
6	Fall River Entrance Historic District	Fall River Entrance Historic District	January 29, 1988 (#87001139)	Fall River Entrance; 40°24′11″N 105°35′13″W	Estes Park	
7	Fall River Pass Ranger Station	Fall River Pass Ranger Station	January 29, 1988 (#87001140)	Fall River Pass; 40°26′27″N 105°45′13″W	Estes Park	
8	Fall River Pump House and Catchment Basin	Fall River Pump House and Catchment Basin	August 30, 2006 (#06000735)	Near the top of Fall River Road in Rocky Mountain National Park; 40°26′15″N 105°44′50″W	Estes Park	
9	Fall River Road	Fall River Road	July 20, 1987 (#87001129)	Fall River Rd. 40°25′47″N 105°42′43″W	Estes Park	
10	Fern Lake Patrol Cabin	Fern Lake Patrol Cabin	January 29, 1988 (#87001142)	Fern Lake; 40°20′17″N 105°40′34″W	Estes Park	
11	Fern Lake Trail	Fern Lake Trail	February 28, 2005 (#05000074)	Rocky Mountain National Park; 40°20′34″N 105°39′48″W	Estes Park	
12	Flattop Mountain Trail	Flattop Mountain Trail	September 27, 2007 (#07000999)	Rocky Mountain National Park; 40°18′50″N 105°40′42″W; 40°18′50″N 105°40′42″W	Estes Park	
13	Gem Lake Trail	Gem Lake Trail	January 29, 2008 (#07001473)	North of Devils Gulch Rd. to Gem Lake; 40°24′40″N 105°30′13″W; 40°24′40″N 105°30′13″W	Estes Park	
14	Glacier Basin Campground Ranger Station	Glacier Basin Campground Ranger Station	July 20, 1987 (#87001143)	Glacier Basin; 40°19′48″N 105°35′40″W	Estes Park	
15	Grand River Ditch	Grand River Ditch	September 29, 1976 (#76000218)	North of Grand Lake; 40°25′10″N 105°52′12″W	Grand Lake	
16	Holzwarth Historic District	Holzwarth Historic District	December 2, 1977 (#77000112)	North of Grand Lake on Trail Ridge Road; 40°22′13″N 105°51′28″W	Grand Lake	
17	Lake Haiyaha Trail	Lake Haiyaha Trail	March 5, 2008 (#08000125)	Roughly along Bear, Nymph, and Dream Lakes, then up Chaos Canyon; 40°18′17″N 105°39′44″W; 40°18′17″N 105°39′44″W	Estes Park	
18	Little Buckaroo Ranch Barn	Little Buckaroo Ranch Barn	July 8, 2009 (#09000490)	20631 Trail Ridge Road; 40°21′22″N 105°51′23″W	Grand Lake	
19	Lost Lake Trail		March 5, 2008 (#08000126)	Roughly along the North Fork of the Big Thompson River; 40°29′56″N 105°33′2″W; 40°29′56″N 105°33′02″W	Estes Park	
20	Lulu City Site	Lulu City Site	September 14, 1977 (#77001562)	North of Grand Lake on Trail Ridge Rd. 40°26′30″N 105°50′50″W	Grand Lake	
21	McGraw Ranch	McGraw Ranch	September 17, 1998 (#98001163)	McGraw Ranch Rd. 40°25′53″N 105°30′06″W	Estes Park	
22	Milner Pass Road Camp Mess Hall and House	Milner Pass Road Camp Mess Hall and House	July 20, 1987 (#87001130)	Milner Pass Rd. 40°25′02″N 105°48′57″W	Estes Park	
23	Moraine Lodge	Moraine Lodge	October 8, 1976 (#76000206)	West of Estes Park off U.S. Route 36 on Bear Lake Rd. 40°21′31″N 105°34′59″W	Estes Park	
24	Moraine Park Museum and Amphitheater	Moraine Park Museum and Amphitheater	June 15, 2005 (76000206 #Lodge 76000206)	Rocky Mountain National Park; 40°21′31″N 105°35′02″W	Estes Park	
25	North Inlet Trail	North Inlet Trail	March 5, 2008 (#08000127)	Roughly along North Inlet and Hallett Creek to Flattop Mountain; 40°15′50″N 105°47′22″W; 40°15′50″N 105°47′22″W	Estes Park and Grand Lake	
26	Rocky Mountain National Park Administration Building	Rocky Mountain National Park Administration Building	January 3, 2001 (#01000069)	U.S. Route 36; 40°21′58″N 105°33′38″W	Estes Park	
27	Rocky Mountain National Park Utility Area Historic District	Rocky Mountain National Park Utility Area Historic District	March 18, 1982 (#82001717)	Beaver Meadows Entrance Rd. 40°21′50″N 105°33′38″W	Estes Park	
28	Sandbeach Lake Trail		January 29, 2008 (#07001471)	South of Lookout Mountain; 40°13′14″N 105°32′12″W	Meeker Park	
29	Shadow Mountain Lookout	Shadow Mountain Lookout	August 2, 1978 (#78000279)	Southeast of Grand Lake in Rocky Mountain National Park; 40°13′50″N 105°48′52″W	Grand Lake	
30	Shadow Mountain Trail	Shadow Mountain Trail	March 5, 2008 (#08000124)	Eastern side of Shadow Mountain Lake; 40°13′40″N 105°49′8″W; 40°13′40″N 105°49′08″W	Grand Lake	
31	Snogo Snow Plow	Snogo Snow Plow	October 4, 2006 (#06000934)	Rocky Mountain National Park; 40°21′51″N 105°33′34″W	Estes Park	
32	Thunder Lake Patrol Cabin	Thunder Lake Patrol Cabin	January 29, 1988 (#87001124)	Thunder Lake; 40°13′20″N 105°38′39″W	Estes Park	
33	Thunder Lake Trail-Bluebird Lake Trail		January 29, 2008 (#07001472)	Roughly along the North St. Vrain Creek, west of Wild Basin Ranger Station; 40°11′34″N 105°39′07″W	Allenspark	
34	Timber Creek Campground Comfort Station No. 245	Timber Creek Campground Comfort Station No. 245	January 29, 1988 (#87001131)	Timber Creek Campground; 40°22′50″N 105°51′05″W	Estes Park	
35	Timber Creek Campground Comfort Station No. 246	Timber Creek Campground Comfort Station No. 246	January 29, 1988 (#87001132)	Timber Creek Campground; 40°22′49″N 105°51′00″W	Estes Park	
36	Timber Creek Campground Comfort Station No. 247	Timber Creek Campground Comfort Station No. 247	January 29, 1988 (#87001131)	Timber Creek Campground; 40°22′42″N 105°51′05″W	Estes Park	
37	Timber Creek Road Camp Barn	Timber Creek Road Camp Barn	July 30, 1987 (#87001134)	Approximately 200 yards south of Columbine Lake Rd., 450 yards west of the Kawuneeche Visitor Center; 40°22′45″N 105°50′53″W	Estes Park	
38	Timberline Cabin	Timberline Cabin	January 29, 1988 (#87001136)	Fall River Rd. 40°26′30″N 105°44′37″W	Estes Park	Demolished.
39	Tonahutu Creek Trail	Tonahutu Creek Trail	March 5, 2008 (#08000130)	Roughly along Tonahutu Creek to Flattop Mountain; 40°19′10″N 105°46′32″W; 40°19′10″N 105°46′32″W	Estes Park and Grand Lake	
40	Trail Ridge Road	Trail Ridge Road	November 14, 1984 (#84000242)	Rocky Mountain National Park; 40°21′30″N 105°45′47″W	Estes Park and Grand Lake	
41	Twin Sisters Lookout	Twin Sisters Lookout	December 24, 1992 (#92001670)	On the Twin Sisters Peaks in Rocky Mountain National Park; 40°17′21″N 105°31′03″W	Estes Park	
42	Agnes Vaille Shelter	Agnes Vaille Shelter	December 24, 1992 (#92001669)	Northwest of Longs Peak along the East Longs Peak Trail in Rocky Mountain National Park; 40°15′38″N 105°37′13″W	Estes Park	
43	William Allen White Cabins	William Allen White Cabins	October 25, 1973 (#73001944)	West of Estes Park of Moraine Park Visitor Center in Rocky Mountain National Park; 40°21′22″N 105°34′55″W	Estes Park	
44	Wild Basin House	Wild Basin House	January 29, 1988 (#87001125)	Wild Basin; 40°12′29″N 105°33′56″W	Estes Park	
45	Wild Basin Ranger Station and House	Wild Basin Ranger Station and House	January 29, 1988 (#87001126)	Wild Basin; 40°12′32″N 105°33′55″W	Estes Park	
46	Beatrice Willard Alpine Tundra Research Plots	Beatrice Willard Alpine Tundra Research Plots	October 25, 2007 (#07001101)	U.S. Route 34 at Rock Cut and Forest Canyon; 40°23′43″N 105°42′40″W	Estes Park	
47	Willow Park Patrol Cabin	Willow Park Patrol Cabin	July 20, 1987 (#87001144)	Fall River Rd. 40°25′59″N 105°44′01″W	Estes Park	
48	Willow Park Stable	Willow Park Stable	July 20, 1987 (#87001145)	Fall River Pass; 40°26′01″N 105°43′59″W	Estes Park	
49	Ypsilon Lake Trail	Ypsilon Lake Trail	March 5, 2008 (#08000131)	Along a ridge between Ciquita Creek and the Roaring River; 40°25′43″N 105°39′02″W	Estes Park	

== Former listings ==
	Name on the Register	Image	Date listed	Date removed	Location	City or town	Description
1	Bear Lake Ranger Station	Bear Lake Ranger Station	January 29, 1988 (#87001138)	April 9, 2009	Bear Lake; 40°18′44″N 105°38′46″W	Estes Park	

== See also ==
- Architects of the National Park Service
- National Register of Historic Places listings in Boulder County, Colorado
- National Register of Historic Places listings in Grand County, Colorado
- National Register of Historic Places listings in Larimer County, Colorado
- List of National Historic Landmarks in Colorado
- National Register of Historic Places listings in Colorado
