= National Register of Historic Places listings in Larimer County, Colorado =

Location of Larimer County in Colorado

This is a list of the National Register of Historic Places listings in Larimer County, Colorado.

This is intended to be a complete list of the properties and districts on the National Register of Historic Places in Larimer County, Colorado, United States. The locations of National Register properties and districts for which the latitude and longitude coordinates are included below, may be seen in a map.

There are 111 properties and districts listed on the National Register in the county, including 2 National Historic Landmarks. Another 4 properties that were once listed have been removed.

This National Park Service list is complete through NPS recent listings posted August 28, 2026.

== Current listings ==
	Name on the Register	Image	Date listed	Location	City or town	Description
1	Ammons Hall	Ammons Hall	June 15, 1978 (#78000864)	Colorado State University campus 40°34′40″N 105°04′52″W	Fort Collins	
2	Peter Anderson House	Peter Anderson House	October 25, 1979 (#79000614)	300 S. Howes St. 40°35′02″N 105°04′47″W	Fort Collins	
3	Armstrong Hotel	Armstrong Hotel	August 31, 2000 (#00001002)	249-261 S. College Ave. 40°35′04″N 105°04′36″W	Fort Collins	
4	Arrowhead Lodge	Arrowhead Lodge	May 27, 1992 (#92000502)	34500 Poudre Canyon Highway in the Roosevelt National Forest; 40°42′13″N 105°38′11″W	Bellvue	Resort camp established 1931 on Cache la Poudre River; now a United States Forest Service visitors' center.
5	Avery House	Avery House	June 24, 1972 (#72000274)	328 W. Mountain Ave. 40°35′14″N 105°04′53″W	Fort Collins	
6	Baker House	Baker House	July 20, 1978 (#78000866)	304-304½ E. Mulberry St. 40°34′54″N 105°04′24″W	Fort Collins	
7	Baldpate Inn	Baldpate Inn	January 11, 1996 (#95001510)	4900 S. State Highway 7; 40°18′30″N 105°32′04″W	Estes Park	
8	Bear Lake Comfort Station	Bear Lake Comfort Station	January 29, 1988 (#87001137)	Bear Lake; 40°18′44″N 105°38′42″W	Estes Park	
9	Bee Farm	Bee Farm	November 25, 2002 (#02001409)	4320 E. County Road 58; 40°40′17″N 104°59′42″W	Fort Collins	
10	A. S. Benson House	A. S. Benson House	January 6, 2004 (#03001362)	463 W. 5th St. 40°23′48″N 105°04′56″W	Loveland	
11	Big Thompson River Bridge III	Big Thompson River Bridge III	October 15, 2002 (#02001139)	U.S. Highway 34 at milepost 85.15; 40°24′54″N 105°11′42″W	Loveland	
12	Big Thompson River Bridge IV	Big Thompson River Bridge IV	October 15, 2002 (#02001140)	U.S. Highway 34 at milepost 86.04; 40°25′07″N 105°10′47″W	Loveland	
13	Bimson Blacksmith Shop	Bimson Blacksmith Shop	July 23, 1981 (#81000185)	224 Mountain St. 40°18′21″N 105°04′32″W	Berthoud	
14	Bingham Homestead Rural Historic Landscape	Bingham Homestead Rural Historic Landscape	April 16, 2013 (#13000161)	4916 Bingham Hill Rd. 40°37′33″N 105°10′07″W	Bellvue	
15	Maude Stanfield Harter Borland House	Maude Stanfield Harter Borland House	July 6, 2004 (#04000662)	610 N. Jefferson Ave. 40°23′52″N 105°04′18″W	Loveland	House and garage built 1920 with "superb integrity" that are "among northern Colorado's best examples of the Craftsman style of architecture."
16	Botanical and Horticultural Laboratory	Botanical and Horticultural Laboratory	September 18, 1978 (#78003395)	Colorado State University campus 40°34′40″N 105°04′41″W	Fort Collins	1890-built, among oldest remaining buildings of the old Colorado Agricultural College campus. Now called Routt Hall.
17	Jay H. Bouton House	Jay H. Bouton House	December 18, 1978 (#78000867)	113 N. Sherwood St. 40°35′15″N 105°05′04″W	Fort Collins	
18	Buckeye School	Buckeye School	June 26, 2008 (#08000599)	Off W. County Road 80; 40°49′35″N 105°05′36″W	Wellington	
19	Buckhorn Ranger Station Historic District		August 12, 2022 (#100007990)	Fire Route 133, Arapaho and Roosevelt National Forests; 40°34′50″N 105°28′07″W	Bellvue	
20	Cascade Cottages	Cascade Cottages	August 27, 2020 (#100005475)	4140 Fall River Rd. (Rocky Mountain National Park); 40°24′09″N 105°36′02″W	Estes Park	
21	Chasteen's Grove		September 6, 1978 (#78000872)	West of Loveland off U.S. Highway 34; 40°25′23″N 105°12′13″W	Loveland	
22	Clatworthy Place	Clatworthy Place	July 14, 2004 (#04000681)	225 Cyteworth Rd. 40°22′21″N 105°31′17″W	Estes Park	
23	Colorado and Southern Railway Depot	Colorado and Southern Railway Depot	June 14, 1982 (#82002303)	405 Railroad Ave. 40°23′46″N 105°04′31″W	Loveland	
24	Crags Lodge	Crags Lodge	July 1, 1998 (#98000814)	300 Riverside Dr. 40°22′12″N 105°31′25″W	Estes Park	
25	Downtown Loveland Historic District	Downtown Loveland Historic District	June 1, 2015 (#15000281)	Roughly bounded by Railroad & Jefferson Aves., alleys between 3rd & 4th Sts. & 4th & 5th Sts. 40°23′44″N 105°04′27″W	Loveland	
26	Dunraven Cottage-Camp Dunraven		April 5, 2019 (#100003644)	898 Fish Creek Rd. 40°21′50″N 105°29′37″W	Estes Park vicinity	
27	East Longs Peak Trail	East Longs Peak Trail	July 10, 2007 (#07000740)	West of State Highway 7; 40°16′20″N 105°36′02″W	Allenspark	Extends into Boulder County.
28	Edgemont	Edgemont	July 15, 1998 (#98000853)	1861 Mary's Lake Rd. 40°21′02″N 105°32′21″W	Estes Park	
29	Elkhorn Lodge	Elkhorn Lodge	December 27, 1978 (#78000862)	530 W. Elkhorn Ave. 40°22′38″N 105°32′00″W	Estes Park	
30	Fall River Entrance Historic District	Fall River Entrance Historic District	January 29, 1988 (#87001139)	Fall River Entrance; 40°24′11″N 105°35′13″W	Estes Park	Boundary increase approved March 5, 2018.
31	Fall River Pass Historic District		December 10, 2021 (#100007216)	Fall River Pass; 40°26′27″N 105°45′21″W	Estes Park	
32	Fall River Pass Ranger Station	Fall River Pass Ranger Station	January 29, 1988 (#87001140)	Fall River Pass; 40°26′27″N 105°45′13″W	Estes Park	
33	Fall River Pump House and Catchment Basin	Fall River Pump House and Catchment Basin	August 30, 2006 (#06000735)	Near the top of Fall River Road in Rocky Mountain National Park; 40°26′15″N 105°44′50″W	Estes Park	
34	Fall River Road	Fall River Road	July 20, 1987 (#87001129)	Fall River Rd. 40°25′47″N 105°42′43″W	Estes Park	Boundary increase approved May 21, 2018
35	Fawn Hollow Store		February 2, 2026 (#100012681)	8039 W. US Highway 34; 40°25′01″N 105°11′37″W	Loveland vicinity	
36	Fern Lake Trail	Fern Lake Trail	February 28, 2005 (#05000074)	Rocky Mountain National Park; 40°20′34″N 105°39′48″W	Estes Park	
37	First National Bank Building	First National Bank Building	August 10, 2000 (#00000937)	3728 Cleveland Ave. 40°42′15″N 105°00′20″W	Wellington	
38	First United Presbyterian Church	First United Presbyterian Church	July 7, 2004 (#04000664)	400 E. 4th St. 40°23′43″N 105°04′16″W	Loveland	
39	Flattop Mountain Trail	Flattop Mountain Trail	September 27, 2007 (#07000999)	Rocky Mountain National Park; 40°18′50″N 105°40′42″W	Estes Park	
40	Jacob and Elizabeth Flowers House	Jacob and Elizabeth Flowers House	March 1, 2007 (#07000086)	5200 W. County Road 52E; 40°37′48″N 105°10′19″W	Bellvue	
41	Fort Collins Armory	Fort Collins Armory	October 15, 2002 (#02001133)	314 E. Mountain Ave. 40°35′14″N 105°04′21″W	Fort Collins	
42	Fort Collins Municipal Railway Birney Safety Streetcar No. 21	Fort Collins Municipal Railway Birney Safety Streetcar No. 21	January 5, 1984 (#84000860)	1801 W. Mountain Ave. 40°35′12″N 105°06′32″W	Fort Collins	
43	Fort Collins Post Office	Fort Collins Post Office	January 30, 1978 (#78000868)	201 S. College Ave. 40°35′07″N 105°04′37″W	Fort Collins	Now used as the Ft. Collins Museum of Contemporary Art
44	Montezuma Fuller House	Montezuma Fuller House	December 15, 1978 (#78000869)	226 W. Magnolia St. 40°34′58″N 105°04′47″W	Fort Collins	
45	Gem Lake Trail	Gem Lake Trail	January 29, 2008 (#07001473)	North of Devils Gulch Rd. to Gem Lake; 40°24′40″N 105°30′13″W	Estes Park	
46	Glacier Basin Campground Ranger Station	Glacier Basin Campground Ranger Station	July 20, 1987 (#87001143)	Glacier Basin; 40°19′48″N 105°35′40″W	Estes Park	
47	Graves Camp Rural Historic District	Graves Camp Rural Historic District	December 14, 2016 (#16000155)	Five miles west of I-25 just south of the Colorado-Wyoming state line, in far northeastern Larimer County; 40°59′11″N 105°00′31″W	Wellington	In the Soapstone Prairie Natural Area
48	Great Western Sugar Company Effluent Flume and Bridge	Great Western Sugar Company Effluent Flume and Bridge	November 19, 2014 (#14000927)	Cache la Poudre R., 1/2 mi. W. of Timberline Rd. 40°34′42″N 105°02′43″W	Fort Collins	
49	Greeley, Salt Lake and Pacific Railroad-Stout Branch	Greeley, Salt Lake and Pacific Railroad-Stout Branch	April 16, 2008 (#08000291)	Approximately 0.5 miles (0.80 km) south of the junction of U.S. Highway 287 and County Road 28; 40°37′32″N 105°09′05″W	Laporte	
50	Harmony Mill	Harmony Mill	November 22, 1995 (#95001327)	131 Lincoln Ave. 40°35′18″N 105°04′13″W	Fort Collins	
51	Hewes-Kirkwood Inn	Hewes-Kirkwood Inn	October 28, 1994 (#94001254)	465 Long Peak Rd. 40°16′18″N 105°33′15″W	Estes Park	Now part of an adult summer music camp.
52	Hollemon-Smith Homestead and Ranch	Hollemon-Smith Homestead and Ranch	March 23, 2023 (#100008783)	6671 Stove Prairie Rd. 40°39′10″N 105°22′20″W	Bellvue	
53	Homestead Meadows Discontiguous District	Homestead Meadows Discontiguous District	October 4, 1990 (#90001476)	At the end of Lion Gulch; 40°19′N 105°27′W	Estes Park	
54	Kaplan-Hoover Site		April 18, 2003 (#03000229)	800 metres (2,600 ft) south of the Cache La Poudre River, west of Windsor; 40°28′19″N 104°57′20″W	Windsor	A bone bed 15 metres (49 ft) long, dating from the Late Archaic period
55	Kelley House	Kelley House	November 15, 2019 (#100004613)	1410 N. Garfield Ave. 40°24′28″N 105°04′40″W	Loveland	
56	Kissock Block Building	Kissock Block Building	May 16, 1985 (#85001061)	115-121 E. Mountain Ave. 40°35′12″N 105°04′33″W	Fort Collins	
57	Lake Haiyaha Trail	Lake Haiyaha Trail	March 5, 2008 (#08000125)	Roughly along Bear, Nymph, and Dream Lakes, then up Chaos Canyon; 40°18′17″N 105°39′44″W	Estes Park	
58	Laurel School Historic District	Laurel School Historic District	October 3, 1980 (#80000909)	Off U.S. Highway 287; 40°34′40″N 105°04′20″W	Fort Collins	
59	Leiffer House		August 2, 1978 (#78000278)	South of Estes Park off State Highway 7; 40°16′34″N 105°32′42″W	Estes Park	
60	Lindenmeier Site	Lindenmeier Site	October 15, 1966 (#66000249)	Address Restricted	Fort Collins	
61	Livermore Hotel and General Store	Livermore Hotel and General Store	September 14, 2001 (#01000970)	2140 Red Feather Lakes Road; 40°47′16″N 105°15′14″W	Livermore	
62	Lost Lake Trail		March 5, 2008 (#08000126)	Roughly along the North Fork of the Big Thompson River; 40°29′56″N 105°33′02″W	Estes Park	
63	Loveland State Armory	Loveland State Armory	April 12, 2001 (#01000350)	201 S. Lincoln Ave. 40°23′28″N 105°04′23″W	Loveland	
64	R.G. Maxwell House	R.G. Maxwell House	September 29, 1980 (#80000910)	2340 W. Mulberry St. 40°35′44″N 105°08′24″W	Fort Collins	
65	MacGregor Ranch	MacGregor Ranch	July 31, 1989 (#89001008)	180 MacGregor Ave. 40°23′45″N 105°31′58″W	Estes Park	
66	William H. McCreery House	William H. McCreery House	May 2, 2001 (#01000445)	746 N. Washington Ave. 40°23′57″N 105°04′10″W	Loveland	
67	McGraw Ranch	McGraw Ranch	September 17, 1998 (#98001163)	McGraw Ranch Rd. 40°25′53″N 105°30′06″W	Estes Park	
68	McHugh–Andrews House	McHugh–Andrews House	December 27, 1978 (#78000870)	202 Remington St. 40°35′08″N 105°04′29″W	Fort Collins	
69	Enos Mills Homestead Cabin	Enos Mills Homestead Cabin	May 11, 1973 (#73000480)	South of Estes Park off State Highway 7; 40°16′54″N 105°32′24″W	Estes Park	
70	Milner-Schwarz House	Milner-Schwarz House	March 19, 2014 (#14000058)	710 S. Railroad Ave. 40°23′09″N 105°04′52″W	Loveland	
71	Moraine Lodge	Moraine Lodge	October 8, 1976 (#76000206)	West of Estes Park off U.S. Highway 36 on Bear Lake Rd. 40°21′31″N 105°34′59″W	Estes Park	Boundaries increased on June 15, 2005 under the name of "Moraine Park Museum and Amphitheater"
72	Mosman House	Mosman House	December 15, 1978 (#78000865)	324 E. Oak St. 40°35′08″N 105°04′21″W	Fort Collins	
73	Mountainside Lodge	Mountainside Lodge	July 20, 2000 (#00000814)	2515 Tunnel Rd. 40°20′05″N 105°35′20″W	Estes Park	On the grounds of the YMCA of the Rockies
74	North Inlet Trail	North Inlet Trail	March 5, 2008 (#08000127)	Roughly along North Inlet and Hallett Creek to Flattop Mountain; 40°15′50″N 105°47′22″W	Grand Lake	Extends into Grand County
75	Old Town Fort Collins	Old Town Fort Collins	August 2, 1978 (#78000871)	Roughly bounded by College Ave. and Mountain, Pine, Willow, and Walnut Sts. 40°35′22″N 105°04′27″W	Fort Collins	
76	Opera House Block/Central Block Building	Opera House Block/Central Block Building	February 8, 1985 (#85000214)	117-131 N. College Ave. 40°35′15″N 105°04′37″W	Fort Collins	
77	Park Theatre	Park Theatre	June 14, 1984 (#84000862)	130 Moraine Ave. 40°22′35″N 105°31′22″W	Estes Park	
78	Patterson House	Patterson House	January 22, 2019 (#100003319)	121 N. Grant Ave. 40°35′17″N 105°05′24″W	Fort Collins	
79	Peep O Day Park	Peep O Day Park	August 10, 2011 (#11000520)	5445 Wild Ln. 40°24′36″N 105°09′17″W	Loveland	
80	Pleasant Valley School	Pleasant Valley School	October 11, 2003 (#03001008)	4032 N. County Road 25E; 40°38′51″N 105°11′07″W	Bellvue	
81	Plummer School	Plummer School	April 29, 1999 (#99000485)	2524 E. Vine Dr. 40°35′47″N 105°01′46″W	Fort Collins	
82	Preston Farm	Preston Farm	May 10, 2001 (#01000489)	4605 S. Ziegler Rd. 40°31′19″N 105°01′14″W	Fort Collins	
83	Provost Homestead-Herring Farm Rural Historic Landscape	Provost Homestead-Herring Farm Rural Historic Landscape	December 27, 2010 (#10001053)	2405 North Overland Trail; 40°37′20″N 105°08′33″W	Laporte	
84	Redfeather Ranger Station		May 5, 2023 (#100008985)	274 Dowdy Lake Rd., Arapahoe and Roosevelt NF; 40°47′38″N 105°34′21″W	Red Feather Lakes	
85	Rialto Theater	Rialto Theater	February 17, 1988 (#87002213)	228-230 E. 4th Ave. 40°23′43″N 105°04′24″W	Loveland	
86	T.H. Robertson House	T.H. Robertson House	July 2, 1992 (#92000811)	420 W. Mountain Ave. 40°35′15″N 105°04′59″W	Fort Collins	
87	Rocky Mountain National Park Administration Building	Rocky Mountain National Park Administration Building	January 3, 2001 (#01000069)	U.S. Highway 36; 40°21′58″N 105°33′38″W	Estes Park	
88	Rocky Mountain National Park Utility Area Historic District	Rocky Mountain National Park Utility Area Historic District	March 18, 1982 (#82001717)	Beaver Meadows Entrance Rd. 40°21′50″N 105°33′38″W	Estes Park	
89	E.A. Schlichter House	E.A. Schlichter House	November 22, 2016 (#16000784)	1312 S. College Ave. 40°34′14″N 105°04′36″W	Fort Collins	
90	The Scott Apartments and Garage	The Scott Apartments and Garage	April 4, 2022 (#100007550)	900 South College Ave. 40°34′30″N 105°04′37″W	Fort Collins	
91	Henry K. and Mary E. Shaffer House	Henry K. and Mary E. Shaffer House	January 9, 2007 (#06001219)	1302 N. Grant Ave. 40°24′22″N 105°04′44″W	Loveland	English-Norman-style house built in 1928-29.
92	Snogo Snow Plow	Snogo Snow Plow	October 4, 2006 (#06000934)	Rocky Mountain National Park; 40°21′51″N 105°33′34″W	Estes Park	
93	Soloman Batterson Ranch		October 15, 2010 (#10000860)	603 Mount Moriah Rd. 40°44′18″N 105°24′19″W	Livermore	
94	Spruce Hall	Spruce Hall	January 9, 1977 (#77000381)	Colorado State University campus 40°34′38″N 105°04′40″W	Fort Collins	
95	The Stanley Hotel	The Stanley Hotel	May 26, 1977 (#77000380)	333 Wonder View Ave. 40°23′00″N 105°31′02″W	Estes Park	
96	Stanley Hotel District	Stanley Hotel District	June 20, 1985 (#85001256)	333 Wonder View Ave.; also Fish Hatchery Rd. at the Fall River; 40°23′00″N 105°31′06″W	Estes Park	Fish Hatchery is the Stanley Power Plant, a boundary increase of April 14, 1998
97	Gustav and Annie Swanson Farm	Gustav and Annie Swanson Farm	October 5, 2005 (#05001116)	1932 N. U.S. Highway 287; 40°22′03″N 105°04′21″W	Berthoud	
98	Tonahutu Creek Trail	Tonahutu Creek Trail	March 5, 2008 (#08000130)	Roughly along Tonahutu Creek to Flattop Mountain; 40°19′10″N 105°46′32″W	Grand Lake	Extends into Grand County
99	Trail Ridge Road	Trail Ridge Road	November 14, 1984 (#84000242)	Rocky Mountain National Park; 40°21′30″N 105°45′47″W	Estes Park	Extends into Grand County
100	Truscott Junior High School	Truscott Junior High School	July 16, 2017 (#100001339)	211 W. 6th St. 40°23′53″N 105°04′43″W	Loveland	
101	Twin Sisters Lookout	Twin Sisters Lookout	December 24, 1992 (#92001670)	On the Twin Sisters Peaks in Rocky Mountain National Park; 40°17′21″N 105°31′03″W	Estes Park	
102	Agnes Vaille Shelter	Agnes Vaille Shelter	December 24, 1992 (#92001669)	Northwest of Longs Peak along the East Longs Peak Trail in Rocky Mountain National Park; 40°15′38″N 105°37′13″W	Estes Park	
103	Vincent-Hatchette Cabin		July 18, 2022 (#100007903)	1629 Bear Lake Rd. 40°21′02″N 105°35′19″W	Estes Park vicinity	
104	Virginia Dale Stage Station	Virginia Dale Stage Station	September 26, 1985 (#85002562)	Off U.S. Highway 287; 40°58′24″N 105°21′54″W	Virginia Dale	
105	Ernest Waycott House	Ernest Waycott House	December 2, 1993 (#93001363)	1501 W. Mountain Ave. 40°35′13″N 105°06′13″W	Fort Collins	
106	William Allen White Cabins	William Allen White Cabins	October 25, 1973 (#73001944)	West of Estes Park of Moraine Park Visitor Center in Rocky Mountain National Park; 40°21′22″N 105°34′55″W	Estes Park	
107	Beatrice Willard Alpine Tundra Research Plots	Beatrice Willard Alpine Tundra Research Plots	October 25, 2007 (#07001101)	U.S. Highway 34 at Rock Cut and Forest Canyon; 40°23′43″N 105°42′40″W	Estes Park	
108	Willow Park Patrol Cabin	Willow Park Patrol Cabin	July 20, 1987 (#87001144)	Fall River Rd. 40°25′59″N 105°44′01″W	Estes Park	
109	Willow Park Stable	Willow Park Stable	July 20, 1987 (#87001145)	Fall River Pass; 40°26′01″N 105°43′59″W	Estes Park	
110	Wind Ridge	Wind Ridge	October 15, 2002 (#02001130)	1397 Clara Dr. 40°23′41″N 105°30′36″W	Estes Park	
111	Ypsilon Lake Trail	Ypsilon Lake Trail	March 5, 2008 (#08000131)	Along a ridge between Chiquita Creek and the Roaring River; 40°25′43″N 105°39′02″W	Estes Park	

== Former listings ==
	Name on the Register	Image	Date listed	Date removed	Location	City or town	Description
1	Bear Lake Ranger Station	Bear Lake Ranger Station	January 29, 1988 (#87001138)	April 9, 2009	Bear Lake; 40°18′44″N 105°38′46″W	Estes Park	Demolished in 1987, prior to its initial Register listing
2	Big Thompson River Bridge I		October 15, 2002 (#02001144)	November 29, 2010	U.S. Highway 34 at milepost 65.53; 40°22′49″N 105°28′19″W	Estes Park	Highway Bridges in Colorado MPS
3	Big Thompson River Bridge II		November 15, 2002 (#02001141)	November 29, 2010	U.S. Highway 34 at milepost 66.22; 40°22′49″N 105°28′19″W	Estes Park	Highway Bridges in Colorado MPS
4	Fern Lake Patrol Cabin	Fern Lake Patrol Cabin	January 29, 1988 (#87001142)	January 28, 2022	Fern Lake; 40°20′17″N 105°40′34″W	Estes Park	Destroyed by the East Troublesome Fire

== See also ==
- List of National Historic Landmarks in Colorado
- List of National Register of Historic Places in Colorado
- Bibliography of Colorado
- Geography of Colorado
- History of Colorado
- Index of Colorado-related articles
- List of Colorado-related lists
- Outline of Colorado
