= Park Theatre (Estes Park, Colorado) =

- U.S. National Register of Historic Places
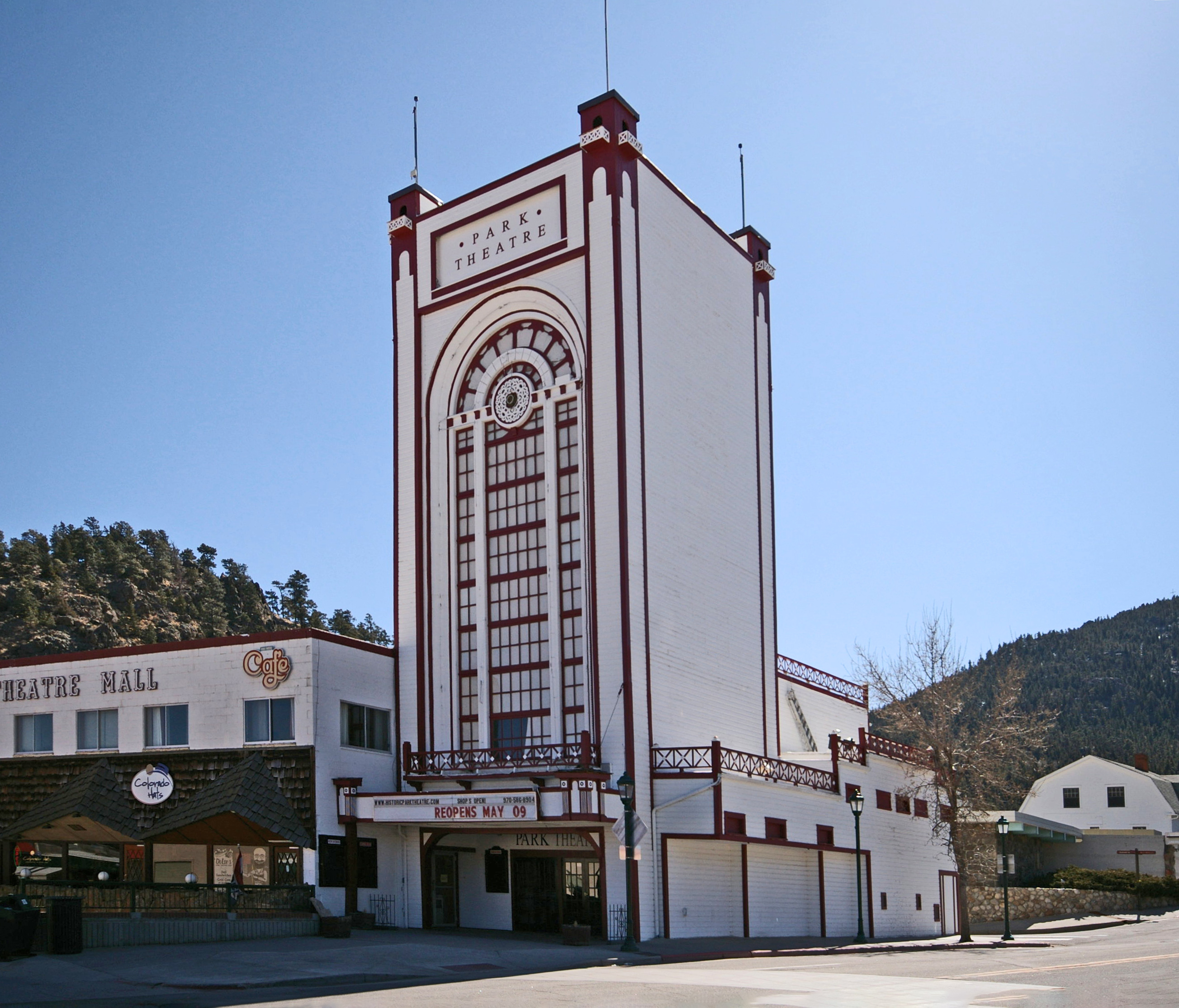

- Location within Colorado Location within the United States
- Location: 130 Moraine Ave., Estes Park, Colorado
- Coordinates: 40°22′35″N 105°31′22″W
- Built: 1913
- Architect: Anderson, J.R.
- Architectural style: Classical Revival
- NRHP reference No.: 84000862
- Added to NRHP: June 14, 1984

The Park Theatre is a historic movie theater building in Estes Park, Colorado. Built in 1913, the theatre is the oldest operating cinema in the western United States.

== History ==
The theatre began construction in 1913 under the ownership of J.L. Jackson. Designed by Joseph R. Anderson, parts of the building were constructed in Longmont and brought to Estes Park to be assembled. Jackson sold the building to Cornelius Howard Bond during construction who, in turn, sold the building to Fred Jackson in 1915.

From 1922 through his death in 1963, the building was owned by Ralph Gwynn, a projectionist from Denver. Gwynn added a lobby in 1922, the building's tower in 1929, and neon lighting on the tower in 1938.

Following Gwynn's tenure, the theatre was bought by Vic Walker in early 1964. In 1976, the building's tower suffered damage from high winds in March and a small fire in June.

Walker sold the theatre to long-time managers Richard and Ola Stanger in 1980. Under their ownership, building improvements included a six-speaker surround sound system, a new walkway, a new entranceway, and a concession stand.

When an updated building code for the town of Estes Park forbade outdoor neon lighting in 1982, residents organized a ballot initiative that resulted in the theatre being granted a variance in 1984, allowing the theatre's neon lights to remain lit.

The building was added to the National Register of Historic Places in 1984.

The theatre currently operates year-round as a movie theatre and event venue, with support from Whimsadoodle, a local non-profit organization dedicated to the arts and betterment of Estes Park.

== See also ==
National Register of Historic Places listings in Larimer County, Colorado
