= Leiffer House =

Historic house in Colorado, United States

- U.S. National Register of Historic Places
- Location within Colorado Location within the United States
- Nearest city: Estes Park, Colorado
- Coordinates: 40°16′34″N 105°32′42″W
- Built: 1923
- Architect: Frank Ralston
- NRHP reference No.: 78000278
- Added to NRHP: August 2, 1978

The Leiffer House, also known as the Kidd-Fink House, was built in 1923 near Estes Park, Colorado, United States. The house was built in a rustic style, using fire-killed timber in a unique local adaptation of the American Craftsman style more prevalent in Southern California. The land was owned from 1901 to 1917 by Enos A. Mills, the "father of Rocky Mountain National Park". Mills sold the property to May L. Kidd, who built the house. The house and its furnishings were donated to the National Park Service, which took possession in 1988.

== See also ==
- National Register of Historic Places listings in Larimer County, Colorado
