= Moraine Park Museum and Amphitheater =

- U.S. National Register of Historic Places
- U.S. Historic district
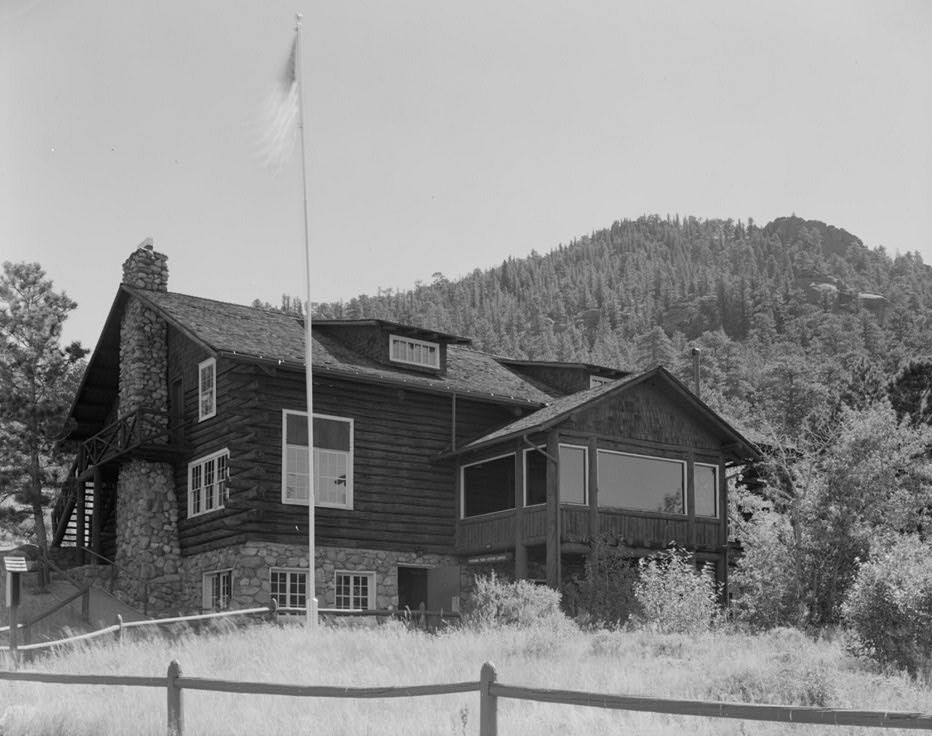
- Moraine Park Museum

- Location within Colorado Location within the United States
- Nearest city: Estes Park, Colorado
- Coordinates: 40°21′31″N 105°35′2″W
- Built: 1923
- Architect: National Park Service; Civilian Conservation Corps
- MPS: Rocky Mountain National Park MPS
- NRHP reference No.: 76000206 (original); 05000602 (increase)

Significant dates
- Added to NRHP: October 8, 1976
- Boundary increase: June 15, 2005

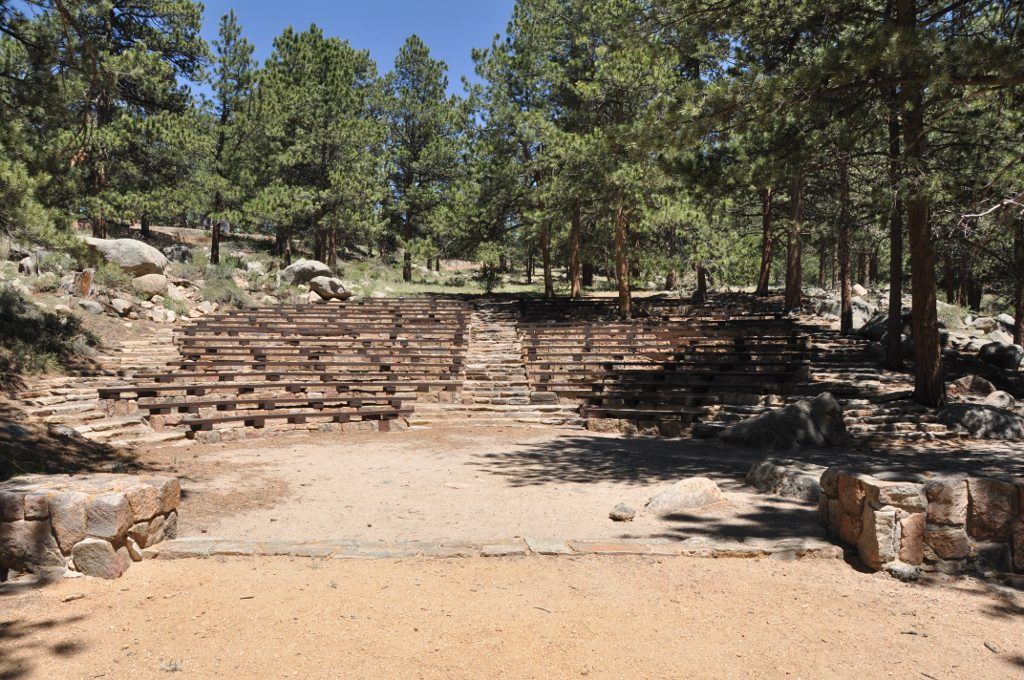
The Moraine Park Amphitheater

The Moraine Park Museum and Amphitheater, also known as the Moraine Park Lodge and the Moraine Park Visitor Center, are located in Moraine Park, a glaciated meadow between two moraines in Rocky Mountain National Park.

The two structures were built to serve visitors to the park, and are listed on the National Register of Historic Places. The museum was built in 1923 by Imogene Green MacPherson as the center of her private tourist development, and was then known as the Moraine Park Lodge. The National Park Service purchased the property in 1931 and demolished the surrounding cabins in following years. The amphitheater was designed and built in 1935, with the design by the NPS Branch of Plans and Designs and the construction by the Civilian Conservation Corps. The lodge was reworked in 1934-35. Both structures adhere to the National Park Service Rustic design ethic of the time, with stone and log construction.

Imogene Green MacPherson first homesteaded the site in Moraine Park in 1903, naming the land "Hillcrest". In 1905, newly married, she expanded with a lodge, dining hall, stable and some cabins for guests. Paying guest began to arrive in 1910. Mrs. MacPherson continued to operate the resort after the death of her husband in 1919, and was involved in the campaign for the establishment of Rocky Mountain National Park. After her death in 1928, her family continued to run the lodge until its purchase by the Park Service.

The amphitheater is built about one hundred feet from the lodge, with seating interspersed with trees. A projection booth and screen once existed, but were removed. An elaborate arrangement of stone gutters and culverts provides drainage.

The Moraine Park Lodge adjoins the William Allen White Cabins historic district.

The museum features interactive natural history exhibits, with themes including geologic processes, glaciation, weather and climate, ecosystems, and human impact. The park offers environmental education programs based on similar themes. The lodge building was listed on the National Register of Historic Places on October 8, 1976. The listing was expanded to include the amphitheater on June 15, 2005.

== Moraine Park meadows ==
The valley of Moraine Park was formed when an ancient glacial lake silted up and drained, forming a flat meadow. The soil is too moist to support most trees but supports grasses, willows, and aspens. The Big Thompson River flows through this valley after coming down glacier-carved Forest Canyon. This habitat area is characterized by ponderosa pine, aspen, and douglas-fir forests, as well as a few large and small meadows. Moraine Park is also a popular place to watch elk, because many elk congregate here for the fall rut.

== See also ==
National Register of Historic Places listings in Larimer County, Colorado
