= Timberline Cabin =

- U.S. National Register of Historic Places
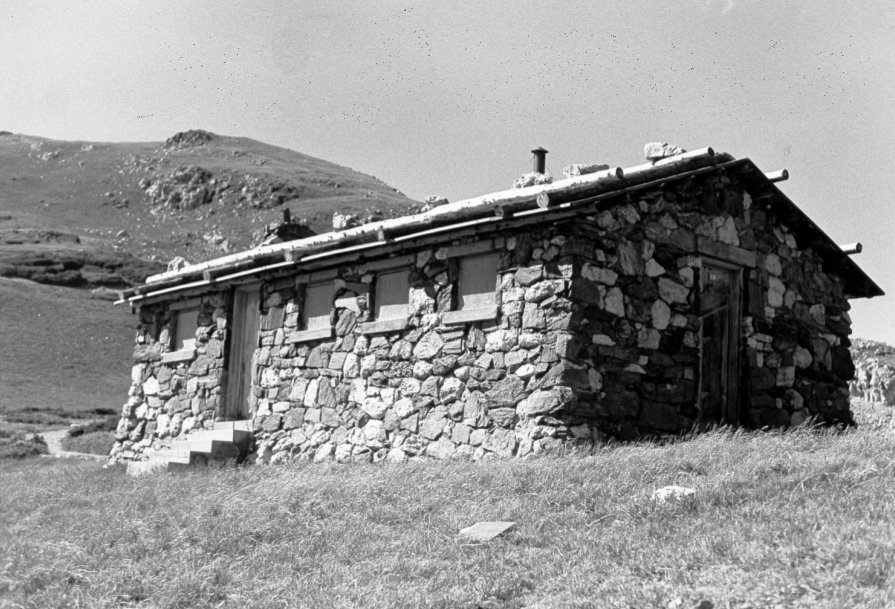
- Photo taken 1985

- Location within Colorado Location within the United States
- Nearest city: vicinity of Estes Park, Colorado
- Coordinates: 40°26′30″N 105°44′37″W
- Area: less than one acre
- Built: 1925
- Architect: T.C. Vint
- Architectural style: NPS Rustic Architecture
- MPS: Rocky Mountain National Park MRA
- NRHP reference No.: 87001136
- Added to NRHP: January 29, 1988

The Timberline Cabin in Rocky Mountain National Park, Colorado, USA was built in 1925 to house workers on the Fall River Road. The National Park Service rustic style cabin was designed by the National Park Service's Landscape Engineering Division under the direction of Thomas Chalmers Vint. The cabin was later used as a patrol cabin and as a caretaker's residence.

The one-story cabin stood above the timberline. It was built of concrete with a stone veneer. The roof framing used peeled logs with an asphalt roll roofing weather surface, protected by a log lattice on top. The cabin had two doors and ten windows, and measured about 32.33 feet (9.85 m) by 16.33 feet (4.98 m).

The Timberline Cabin was placed on the National Register of Historic Places on January 29, 1988. It has since been demolished.

== See also ==
- National Register of Historic Places listings in Grand County, Colorado
- National Register of Historic Places listings in Rocky Mountain National Park
