= Arrowhead Lodge =

- U.S. National Register of Historic Places
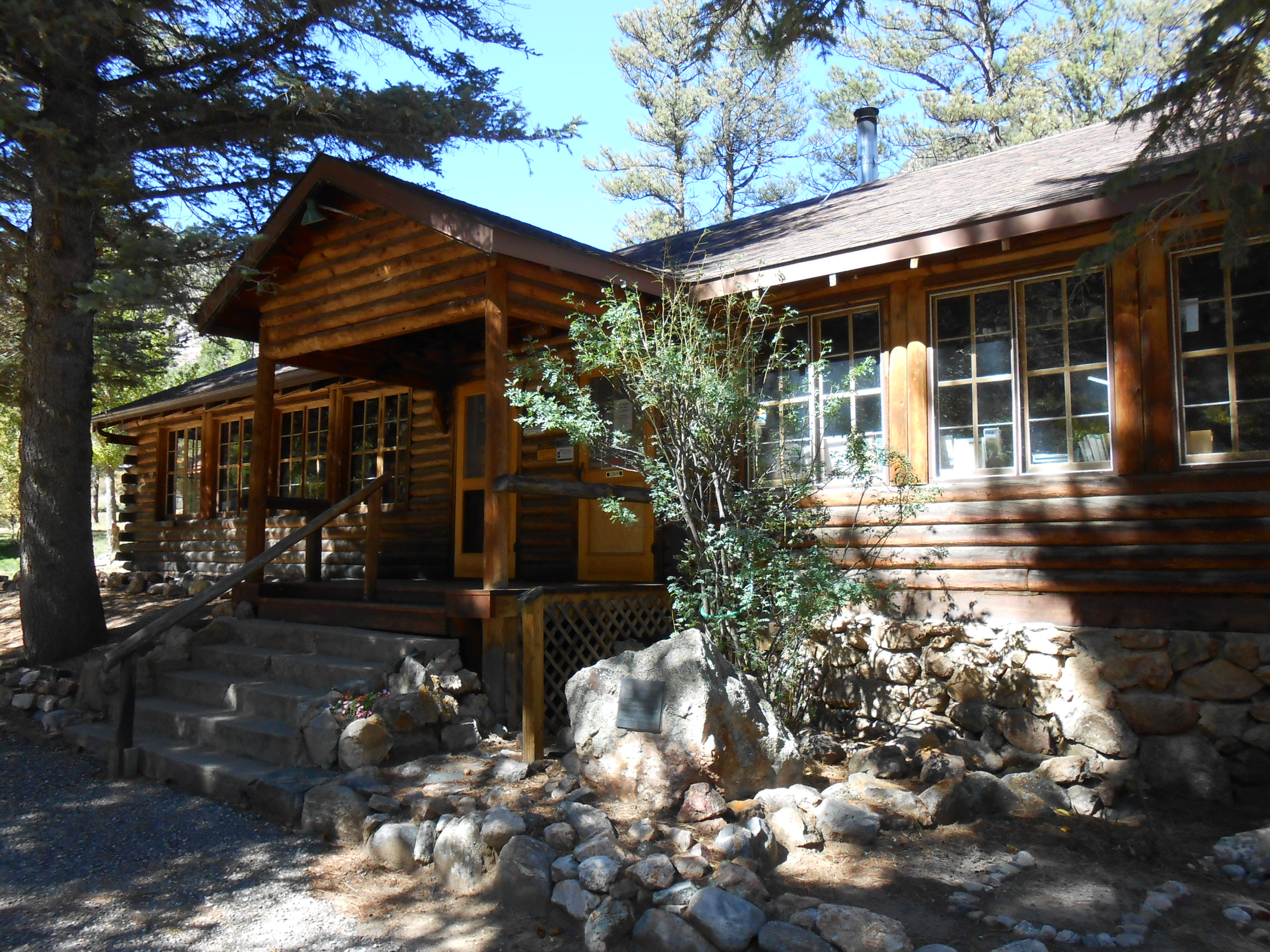
- Main lodge building in 2013

- Location within Colorado
- Location: 34500 Poudre Canyon Hwy., Roosevelt National Forest, Larimer County, Colorado
- Coordinates: 40.70371°N 105.63637°W
- Area: 3 acres (1.2 ha)
- Built: 1931
- Built by: Carl Brafford, Wayne Frakes, and Brye Gladstone
- Architectural style: Rustic
- NRHP reference No.: 92000502
- Added to NRHP: May 27, 1992

The Arrowhead Lodge, at 34500 Poudre Canyon Hwy., Roosevelt National Forest, in Larimer County, Colorado, served by the post office in unincorporated Bellvue, Colorado, was a resort camp which was built in 1931. It was listed on the National Register of Historic Places in 1992.

The listed area includes 27 buildings, 22 of them being contributing buildings, a contributing object (a sign), and various noncontributing structures and objects, on 3 acres (1.2 ha).

Its main lodge is currently a United States Forest Service visitor center. Other buildings include 13 historic, Rustic-style cabins.

It is at elevation 7,410 feet (2,260 m), about 32 miles (51 km) up Cache la Poudre Canyon. It is reached by Colorado State Highway 14, which runs west off U.S. Highway 287, about 8 miles (13 km) northwest of Fort Collins, Colorado.

It is located in Roosevelt National Forest "in the rugged lower montane climax region typical of Colorado's Rocky Mountain eastern slope," on the north bank of the Cache la Poudre River.

== See also ==
- National Register of Historic Places listings in Larimer County, Colorado
