= William H. McCreery House =

Historic house in Colorado, United States

- U.S. National Register of Historic Places
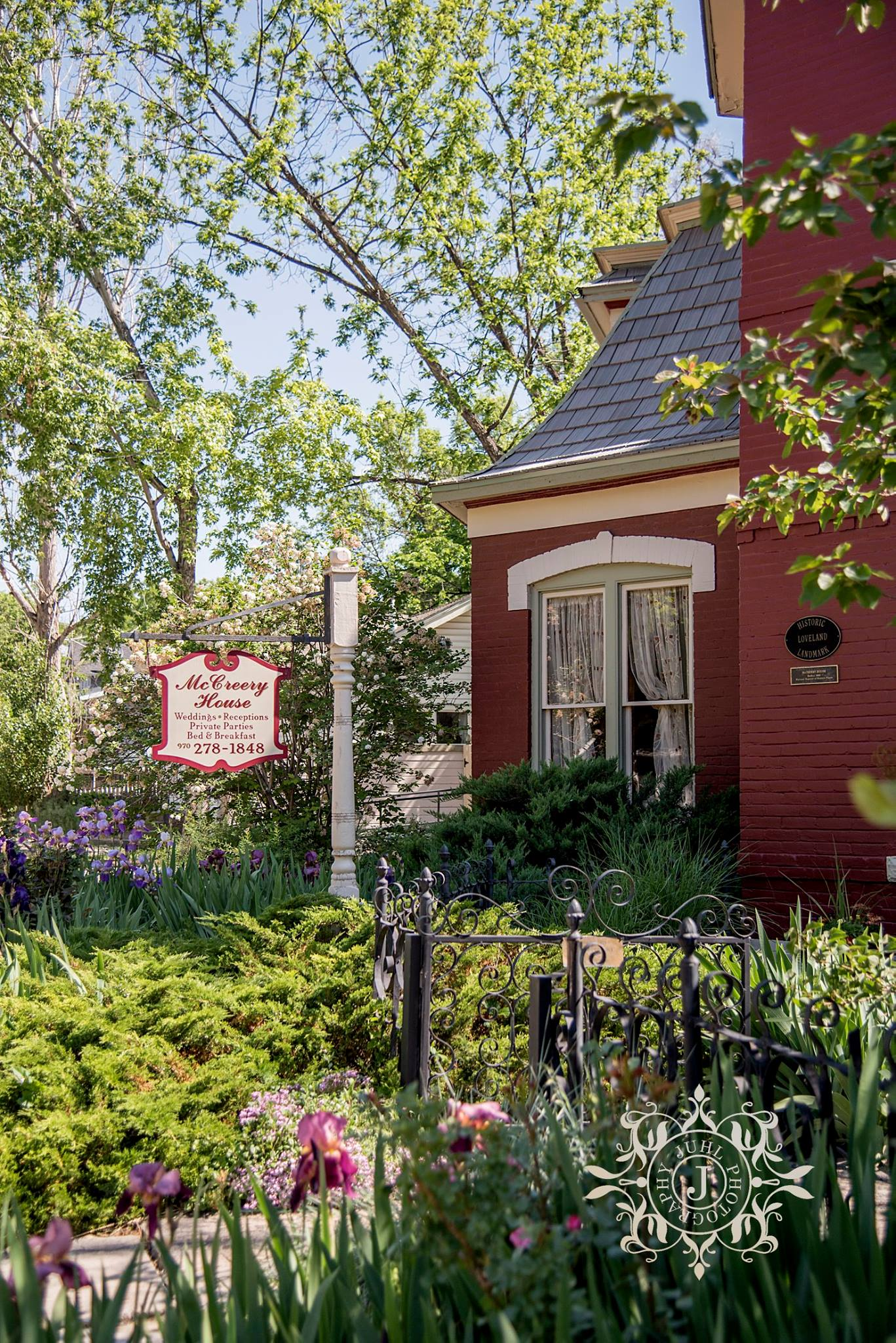
- The McCreery House Wedding and Event Venue as seen from the front/side of the house

- Location within Colorado Location within the United States
- Location: 746 N. Washington Ave., Loveland, Colorado
- Coordinates: 40°23′57″N 105°4′10″W
- Built: 1900
- Architect: McCreery, William H.
- Architectural style: Hexagon Mode, Second Empire
- Website: www.mccreeryhouse.com
- NRHP reference No.: 01000445
- Added to NRHP: May 2, 2001

The William H. McCreery House, also known as The McCreery House, operates as a wedding and event venue in Loveland, Colorado. It was built by William H. McCreery in 1900 and is an historic hexagonal house located at 746 North Washington Avenue in Loveland, Colorado.

In 2001 it was added to the National Register of Historic Places.

Its original portion was built in 1892.

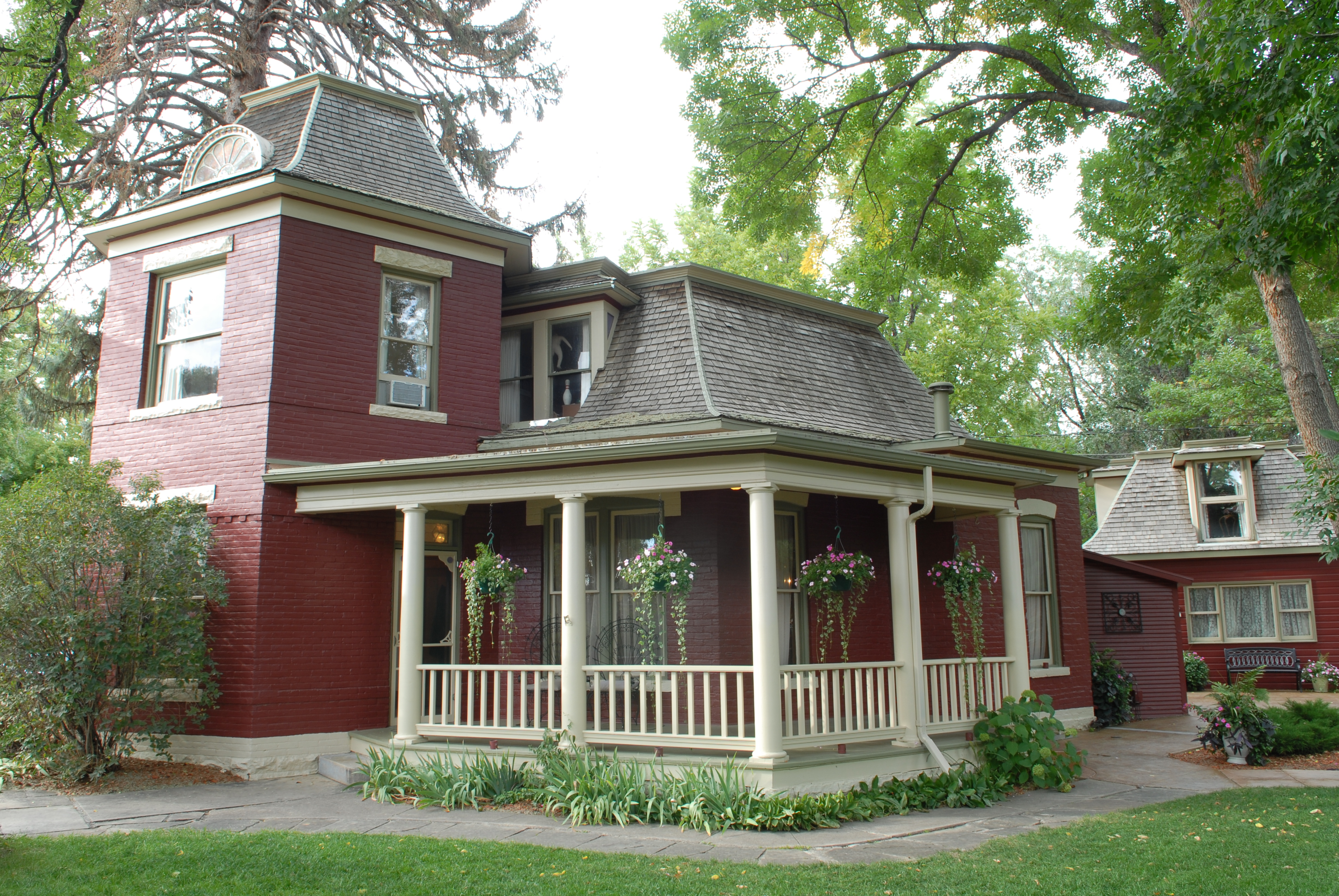
A view of the porch from the back yard. This clearly shows the hexagonal "tower" section and the original front entrance to the house.

== See also ==
National Register of Historic Places listings in Larimer County, Colorado
