= Willow Park Patrol Cabin =

- U.S. National Register of Historic Places
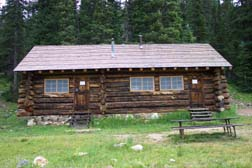
- Front of the cabin

- Location within Colorado Location within the United States
- Nearest city: Estes Park, Colorado
- Coordinates: 40°25′59″N 105°44′1″W
- Built: 1923
- Architect: Daniel Ray Hull; NPS Landscape Engineering Division
- MPS: Rocky Mountain National Park MRA
- NRHP reference No.: 87001144
- Added to NRHP: July 20, 1987

The Willow Park Patrol Cabin, also known as the Willow Park Ranger Station and the Willow Park Cook and Mess Hall, was built in Rocky Mountain National Park in 1923 to the design of members of the National Park Service Landscape Engineering Division under the supervision of Daniel Ray Hull. The cabin is an early example of the National Park Service Rustic style that was gaining favor with the Park Service. The cabin, along with the Willow Park Stable, originally accommodated maintenance crews on the Fall River Road.

== See also ==
- Architects of the National Park Service
- National Register of Historic Places listings in Rocky Mountain National Park
- National Register of Historic Places listings in Larimer County, Colorado
