= Willow Park Stable =

- U.S. National Register of Historic Places
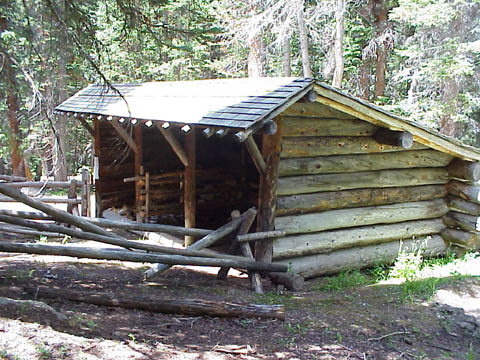
- Front and side of the stable

- Location within Colorado Location within the United States
- Nearest city: Estes Park, Colorado
- Coordinates: 40°26′1″N 105°43′59″W
- Built: 1926
- Architect: Daniel Ray Hull, NPS Landscape Engineering Division
- MPS: Rocky Mountain National Park MRA
- NRHP reference No.: 87001145
- Added to NRHP: July 20, 1987

The Willow Park Stable in Rocky Mountain National Park was designed by National Park Service landscape architect Daniel Ray Hull and built in 1926. The National Park Service Rustic style stables and the nearby Willow Park Patrol Cabin were built to house crews maintaining the Fall River Road.

== See also ==
- National Register of Historic Places listings in Larimer County, Colorado
