= Rocky Mountain National Park Utility Area Historic District =

Historic district in Colorado, United States

- U.S. National Register of Historic Places
- U.S. Historic district
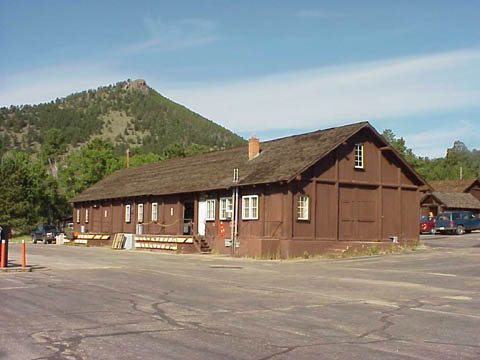
- A warehouse in the district

- Location within Colorado Location within the United States
- Nearest city: Estes Park, Colorado
- Coordinates: 40°21′50″N 105°33′38″W
- Built: 1923
- Architect: National Park Service; Taliesin Associated Architects, Ltd.
- MPS: Rocky Mountain National Park MRA (AD)
- NRHP reference No.: 82001717
- Added to NRHP: March 18, 1982

The Rocky Mountain National Park Utility Area Historic District in Rocky Mountain National Park documents the early administrative core of the park. Beginning in 1920 and continuing into the 1930s, park service and administrative structures were built in the National Park Service Rustic style. Most buildings were built of logs under a policy of blending with the natural landscape. Later construction has respected the materials and scale of the area. Structures include McLaren Hall, designed by landscape architect W.G. Hill, a number of employee residences including the superintendent's residence, equipment sheds, garages and utility buildings. Many of the buildings built in the 1930s were built by Civilian Conservation Corps labor. The Beaver Meadows Visitor Center is individually listed as a National Historic Landmark.

== See also ==
- National Register of Historic Places listings in Larimer County, Colorado
