= Buckeye School =

- U.S. National Register of Historic Places
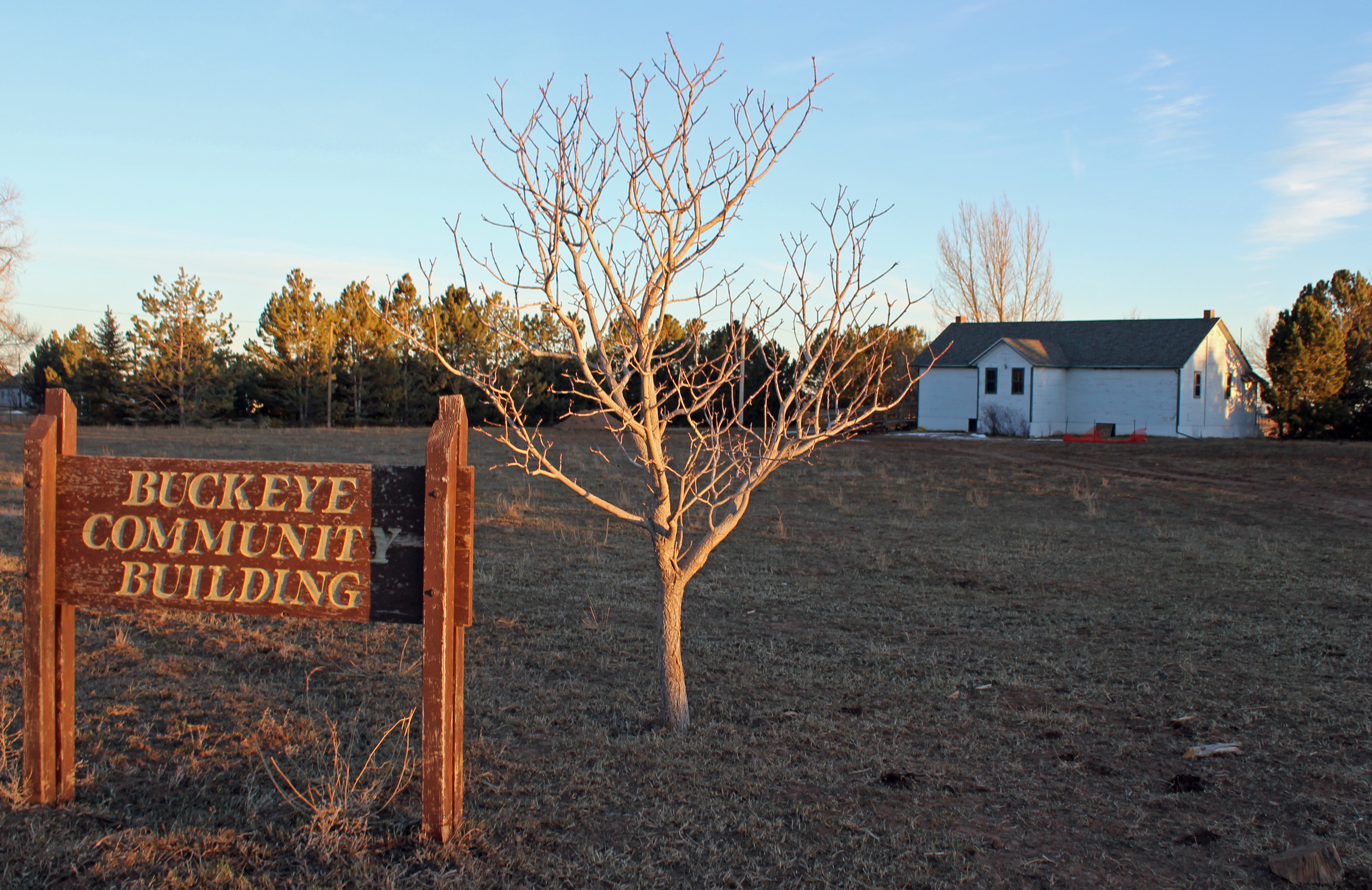
- Building and "Buckeye Community Center" sign in 2014

- Location within Colorado
- Nearest city: Wellington, Colorado
- Coordinates: 40°49′35″N 105°05′34″W
- Area: 3 acres (1.2 ha)
- Built: 1925
- Built by: O.A. Decker
- Architectural style: Late 19th and Early 20th Century American Movements, Rural schoolhouse
- MPS: Rural School Buildings in Colorado MPS
- NRHP reference No.: 08000599
- Added to NRHP: June 26, 2008

The Buckeye School, in Larimer County, Colorado near Wellington, Colorado, now known as the Buckeye Community Center, was a rural two-room schoolhouse built in 1925. It was used as a school until 1960. It was listed on the National Register of Historic Places in 2008.

It was considered to be a large school, as it was 25 by 60 feet (7.6 m × 18.3 m) in plan with 10 feet (3.0 m) high ceilings, a basement, and an attic. The main floor's open space could be used as a single classroom if a moveable, wooden, folding partition was opened. The partition, which has a door at each end, was used to separate older, upper grade students from younger, lower grade ones, when enrollment justified.

A basement level held a kitchen, two storage areas, and a teacher's living quarters. The storage areas, about 6 by 11 feet (1.8 m × 3.4 m) in dimension, were used to store wood and to store coal, for use in heating the building, and were loaded from pickup trucks by access chutes. Around 1944, when wood stoves had been replaced by butane stoves and when plumbing was installed, the storage areas were converted into girls' and boys' restrooms.

The school demonstrates features of post-1920s school design, including clustered windows on the south side of the building providing light coming in behind schoolchildren facing north.

It was named "Buckeye School" for the buckeye trees which grew in its area, although they are rare in Colorado.

A contributing site in the listing is a playground area holding surviving merry-go-round, swing set, teeter totter, slide and flagpole, on the south side of the building.

It was built by contract-winner O.A. Decker at final cost of $4,983.17. An original small stable and two original privvies are no longer present.

It is located off West County Road 80 about 15 miles (24 km) northwest of Wellington, and about 12 miles (19 km) from the Wyoming state border.
