= Fall River Entrance Historic District =

Historic district in Colorado, United States

- U.S. National Register of Historic Places
- U.S. Historic district
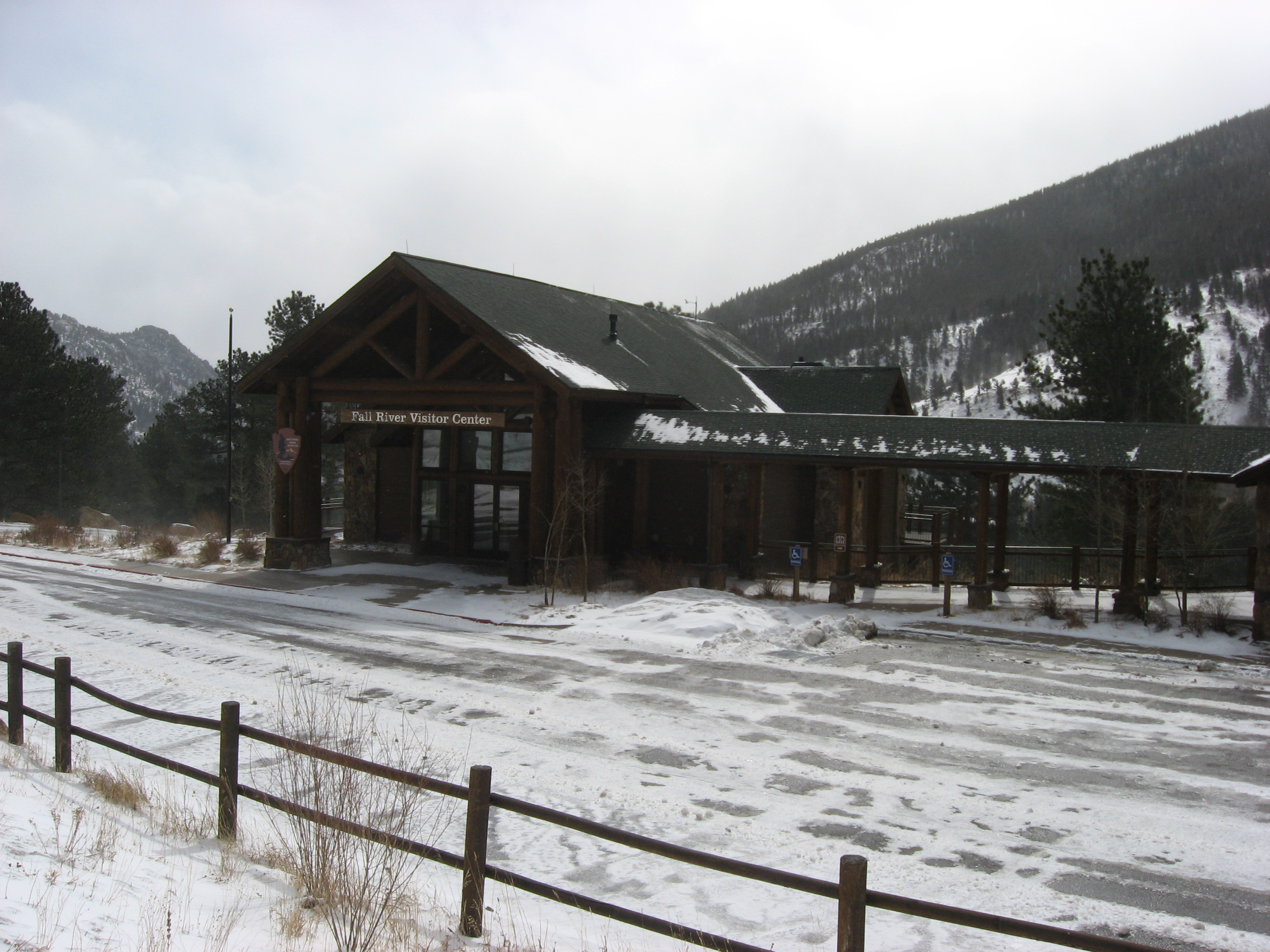
- Fall River Visitor Center

- Location within Colorado Location within the United States
- Nearest city: Estes Park, Colorado
- Coordinates: 40°24′11.232″N 105°35′13.452″W
- Built: 1936
- Architect: E.A. Nickel, NPS Branch of Plans and Design
- MPS: Rocky Mountain National Park MRA
- NRHP reference No.: 87001139 (original); 100002148 (increase)

Significant dates
- Added to NRHP: January 29, 1988
- Boundary increase: March 5, 2018

The Fall River Entrance Historic District in Rocky Mountain National Park preserves an area of park administration buildings and employee residences built in the National Park Service Rustic style. The area is close to Estes Park, Colorado, at the original primary entrance to the east side of the park. The area includes the Bighorn Ranger Station, several houses, and some utility buildings. The buildings were designed in the 1920s and 1930s by the National Park Service Branch of Plans and Designs. Many of the 1930s buildings were built by Civilian Conservation Corps labor.

The district was listed on the National Register of Historic Places in 1988, and enlarged in 2018.

== See also ==
- National Register of Historic Places listings in Larimer County, Colorado

== See also ==
- Fall River Road
