= Maude Stanfield Harter Borland House =

- U.S. National Register of Historic Places
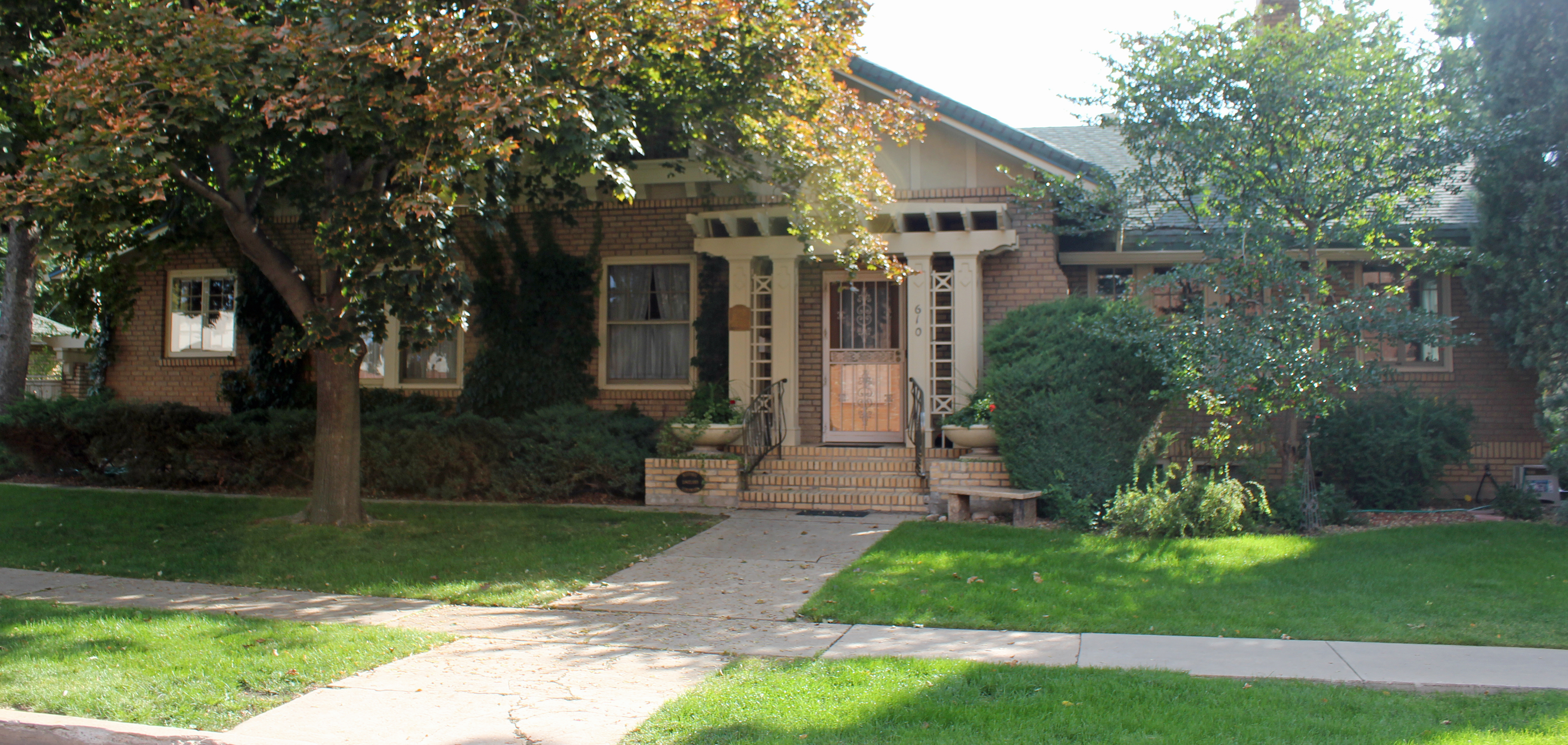
- House in 2012

- Location within Colorado
- Location: 610 N. Jefferson Ave., Loveland, Colorado
- Coordinates: 40.39781°N 105.07159°W
- Area: less than one acre
- Built: 1920
- Architect: Robert K. Fuller
- Architectural style: Bungalow/craftsman
- NRHP reference No.: 04000662
- Added to NRHP: July 6, 2004

The Maude Stanfield Harter Borland House, at 610 N. Jefferson Ave. in Loveland, Colorado, was built in 1920. It was listed on the National Register of Historic Places in 2004.

The house and its garage were built in 1920, designed by Robert K. Fuller. They have been deemed to be "among northern Colorado's best examples of the Craftsman style of architecture" and to display "superb integrity".

It has also been known as the Pollyann Castle Baird House. In 1992 the house was inherited from her Aunt Maude by Pollyann Castle (Kitchen) Baird. In 2004, at age eighty, she was still the home's owner and resident, and had "gained renown as a championship-caliber United States Ballroom Dance Champion. Mrs. Baird presently participates in three or four competitions per year, and has captured bronze, silver and gold medals in the American Smooth, International Standard, International Latin, and American Rhythm styles of ballroom dancing. She attained the title of United States Ballroom Champion, Senior Division, in the International Standard style in 1992. She also achieved national titles in three styles of dance for eight years up to 1997," and was still actively participating in competitions.
