= Tonahutu Creek Trail =

- U.S. National Register of Historic Places
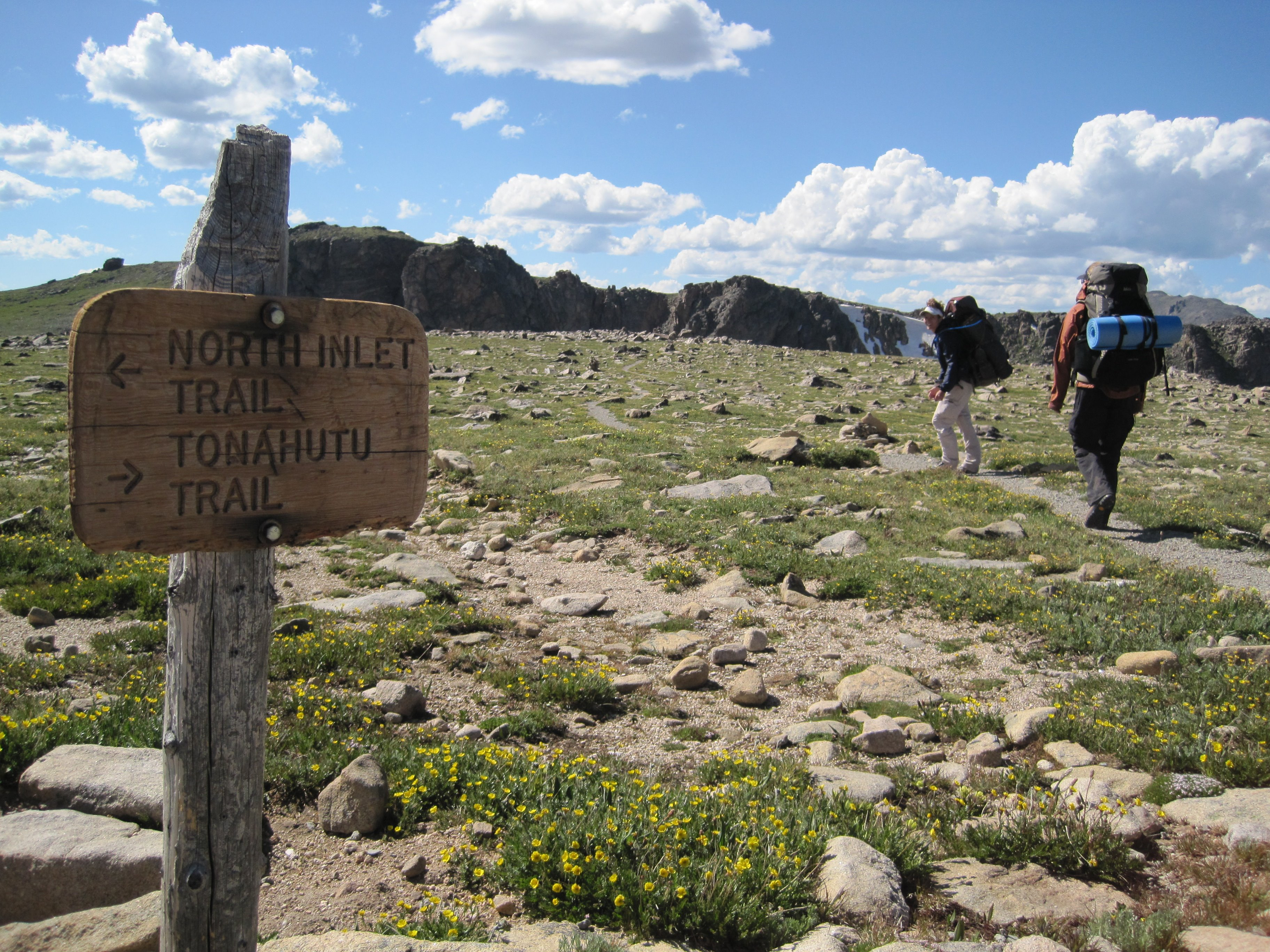

- Location within Colorado
- Nearest city: Grand Lake, Colorado
- Coordinates: 40.319444°N 105.775556°W
- Area: 31.5 acres (12.7 ha)
- Built: 1918
- Architect: Architects of the National Park Service
- Architectural style: Late 19th and Early 20th Century American Movements, Rustic
- MPS: Rocky Mountain National Park MPS
- NRHP reference No.: 08000130
- Added to NRHP: March 5, 2008

The Tonahutu Creek Trail, in the general area of Grand Lake, Colorado, in both Grand and Larimer counties, was listed on the National Register of Historic Places in 2008.

It is also known as Little North Inlet Trail and as Tonahutu Trail.

The trail runs from very close to Grand Lake roughly along Tonahutu Creek to Flattop Mountain, in the west side of Rocky Mountain National Park.

The general route was established in 1880; the trail was improved in 1924. Its main trail is about 13 miles (21 km) long. Its significant built features (paraphrasing the NRHP document) include dry rock walls, log footbridge/ford combinations, bogwalks, log and rock water bars and drains, the Harbison Ditch, and abandoned cabins in Big Meadows.

The listing includes one contributing structure. The trail reflects landscape architecture design by National Park Service architects.

== See also ==
- Flattop Mountain Trail
