= Fall River Pass Ranger Station =

- U.S. National Register of Historic Places
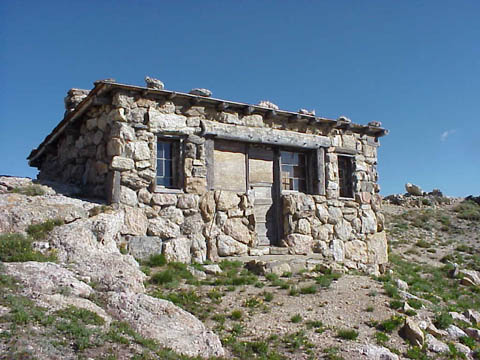
- Front of the station

- Location within Colorado Location within the United States
- Nearest city: Estes Park, Colorado
- Coordinates: 40°26′27″N 105°45′13″W
- Built: 1922
- Architect: Daniel Ray Hull
- MPS: Rocky Mountain National Park MRA
- NRHP reference No.: 87001140
- Added to NRHP: January 29, 1988

The Fall River Pass Ranger Station in Rocky Mountain National Park was designed by National Park Service landscape architect Daniel Ray Hull in the National Park Service Rustic style. Built in 1922, the stone structure is similar in design to the Chasm Lake Shelter. Between 1933 and 1937 the ranger station was converted to a museum. The ranger station is associated with the construction of the nearby Trail Ridge Road. Located above the tree line, the building has a trap door in the roof to allow access when the door is blocked by drifting snow.

== See also ==
- Fall River Pump House and Catchment Basin
- National Register of Historic Places listings in Larimer County, Colorado
