= Glacier Basin Campground Ranger Station =

- U.S. National Register of Historic Places
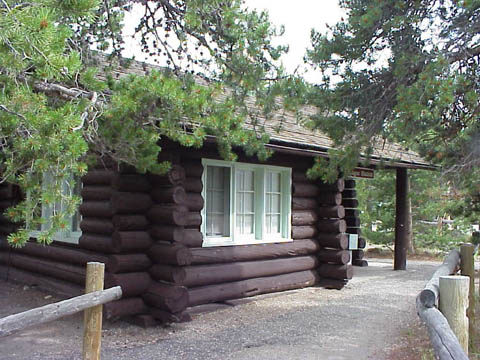
- Front of the station

- Location within Colorado Location within the United States
- Nearest city: Estes Park, Colorado
- Coordinates: 40°19′48″N 105°35′40″W
- Built: 1930
- Architect: NPS Branch of Plans and Designs
- MPS: Rocky Mountain National Park MRA
- NRHP reference No.: 87001143
- Added to NRHP: July 20, 1987

The Glacier Basin Campground Ranger Station in Rocky Mountain National Park was built in 1930 to a design by the National Park Service Branch of Plans and Designs. The National Park Service Rustic log and stone structure was designed to blend with the landscape, and continues to function as a ranger station.

== See also ==
- National Register of Historic Places listings in Larimer County, Colorado
