= Twin Sisters Lookout =

- U.S. National Register of Historic Places
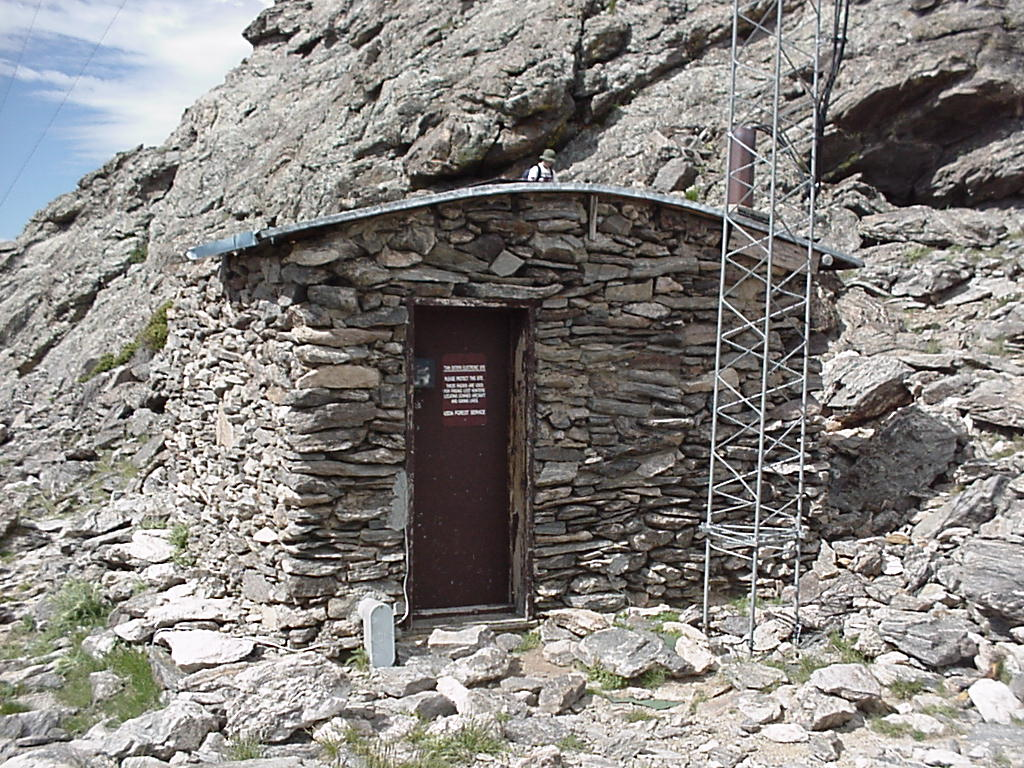
- Front of the Lookout

- Location within Colorado Location within the United States
- Nearest city: Estes Park, Colorado
- Coordinates: 40°17′21″N 105°31′3″W
- Built: 1914
- Architect: US Forest Service
- MPS: Rocky Mountain National Park MRA
- NRHP reference No.: 92001670
- Added to NRHP: December 24, 1992

The Twin Sisters Lookout, also known as the Twin Sisters Radio Tower and the Twin Sisters Shelter Cabin, was built by the U.S. Forest Service in 1914, the year before the establishment of Rocky Mountain National Park. The rustic stone structure was taken over by the National Park Service in 1925. The one-story building has an arched roof with a trap door to provide access when snow has drifted over the ground-level door.

From 1914 to 1969, the shelter served as accommodations for fire observation crews at a nearby lookout. The lookout, originally a frame building, was replaced with a steel building in 1950 that was in use through 1971. The lookout was dismantled and removed in 1977 by Youth Conservation Corps members. The shelter is now used as a radio repeater station.

== See also ==
- National Register of Historic Places listings in Larimer County, Colorado
