= Fall River Pump House and Catchment Basin =

- U.S. National Register of Historic Places
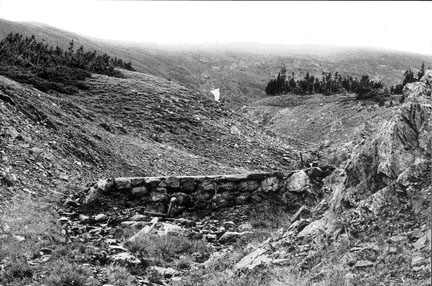
- View of the catchment basin

- Location within Colorado Location within the United States
- Location: near the top of Fall River Rd., Rocky Mountain National Park, Estes Park, Colorado
- Coordinates: 40°26′15″N 105°44′50″W
- Built: 1938
- Architect: National Park Service
- MPS: Rocky Mountain National Park MRA
- NRHP reference No.: 06000735
- Added to NRHP: August 30, 2006

The Fall River Pump House and Catchment Basin in Rocky Mountain National Park, Colorado, are utility structures which treat water for the Fall River Pass Museum and the Alpine Visitor Center.

== Description ==
Built in 1938, the facility was designed by National Park Service landscape architects L. Fletcher and W.G. Hill in the National Park Service Rustic style then favored. The pump house is a simple stone-faced concrete building, built into the hillside.

The catchment basin captures a stream behind a small stone-faced concrete dam.

== See also ==
- Fall River Pass Ranger Station
- National Register of Historic Places listings in Larimer County, Colorado
