= Fern Lake Patrol Cabin =

Historic house in Colorado, United States

- Formerly listed on the U.S. National Register of Historic Places
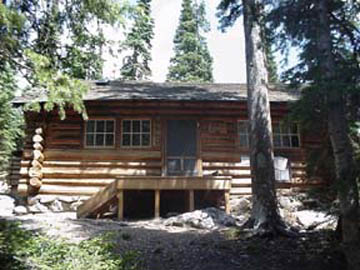
- Front of the cabin

- Location within Colorado Location within the United States
- Nearest city: Estes Park, Colorado
- Coordinates: 40°20′17″N 105°40′34″W
- Built: 1925; 101 years ago
- Architect: Daniel Ray Hull, NPS Landscape Engineering Division
- MPS: Rocky Mountain National Park MRA
- NRHP reference No.: 87001142

Significant dates
- Added to NRHP: January 29, 1988
- Removed from NRHP: January 28, 2022

The Fern Lake Patrol Cabin in Rocky Mountain National Park was designed by National Park Service landscape Daniel Ray Hull and built in 1925. The National Park Service Rustic cabin was used for a time as a ranger station. It was destroyed by the East Troublesome Fire in 2020. It was listed on the National Register of Historic Places in 1988, and was delisted in 2022, after being destroyed by the East Troublesome Fire.

== See also ==
National Register of Historic Places listings in Larimer County, Colorado
