= Bear Lake Comfort Station =

- U.S. National Register of Historic Places
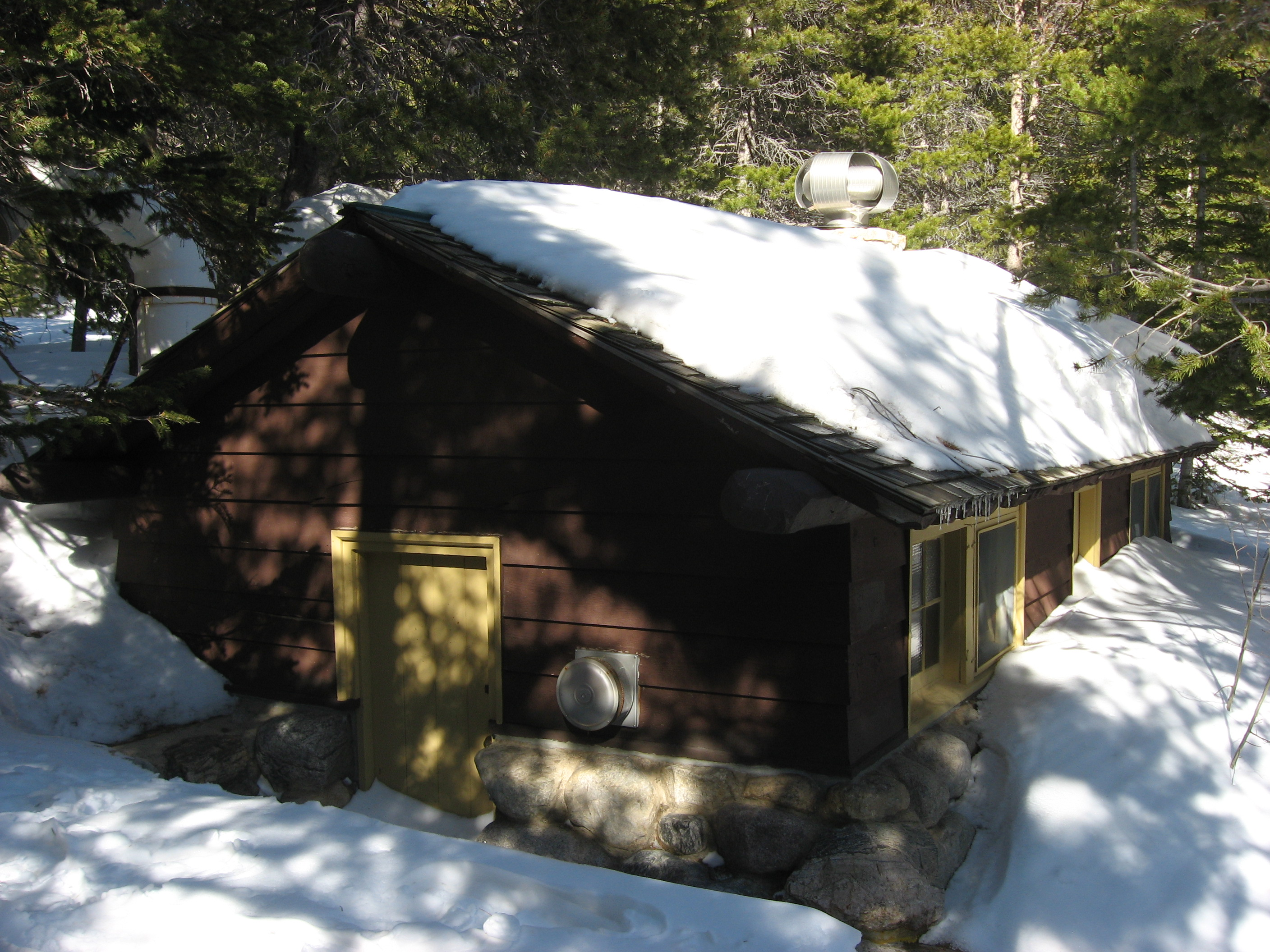
- Southern and western sides of the building in winter

- Location within Colorado Location within the United States
- Nearest city: Estes Park, Colorado
- Coordinates: 40°18′44″N 105°38′42″W
- Built: 1940
- Architect: W.C. Hill, NPS Branch of Plans and Design
- MPS: Rocky Mountain National Park MRA
- NRHP reference No.: 87001137
- Added to NRHP: January 29, 1988

The Bear Lake Comfort Station, also known as the Bear Lake Generator Building, in Rocky Mountain National Park was designed by the National Park Service Branch of Plans and Designs is the National Park Service Rustic style and was built in 1940. It was converted for use as a generator house at an unknown date and apparently no longer serves its former purpose as a public toilet. It was added to the National Register of Historic Places on January 29, 1988.

== See also ==
- National Register of Historic Places listings in Larimer County, Colorado
