= McGraw Ranch =

- U.S. National Register of Historic Places
- U.S. Historic district
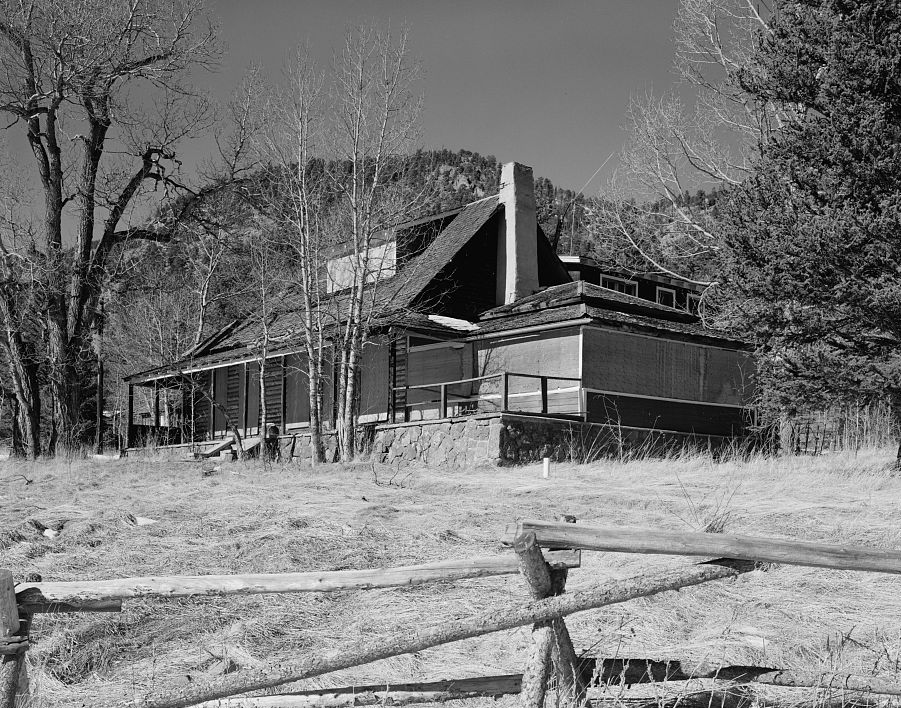
- Main House and office

- Location within Colorado Location within the United States
- Location: Rocky Mountain National Park, Larimer County, Colorado, USA
- Nearest city: Estes Park, Colorado
- Coordinates: 40°25′53″N 105°30′6″W
- Built: 1936
- MPS: Rocky Mountain National Park MRA
- NRHP reference No.: 98001163
- Added to NRHP: September 17, 1998

The McGraw Ranch, also known as the Indian Head Ranch, the =Y Ranch (Double Bar-Y) and the =X Ranch (Double Bar-X), was established in the Cow Creek valley near Estes Park, Colorado by Peter J. Pauley, Jr., who built a barn at his 160-acre (0.65 km^{2}) =Y Ranch in 1884, running 2500 head of cattle on the land. The land was sold in 1897 to Hugo S. Miller, who worked with Henry C. Rouse to expand the property to a thousand acres (4 km²). In 1907 Miller and his wife inherited the lands from Rouse and were visited by Joh J. and Irene McGraw, who leased the property the next summer and purchased it in 1909, changing the brand to =X.

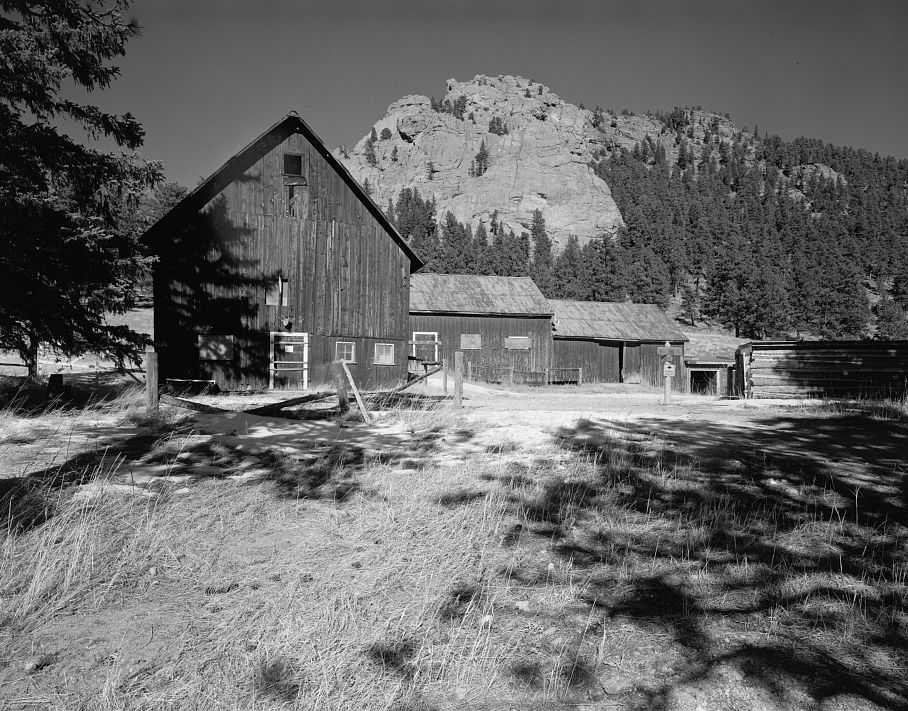
McGraw Ranch barn

The McGraws ranched the land unprofitably until John died in 1917. Irene continued ranching, but in 1935-36 converted to guest ranching. The McGraw family built several cabins, and under the motto "Ranching with Ease" the family operated the guest ranch until 1973. From 1973 to 1988 the property changed hands several times, until the National Park Service bought it with the intention to restore the landscape to its natural state as part of Rocky Mountain National Park. Opposition from local communities convinced the Park Service to convert the ranch to a research facility. It is the only intact dude ranch in Rocky Mountain National Park.

The ranch was used in 1936 by U.S. presidential candidate Alf Landon as a campaign headquarters, giving the ranch valuable publicity as it was being converted to a dude ranch.

== See also ==
- National Register of Historic Places listings in Larimer County, Colorado
