= Old Town Fort Collins =

- U.S. National Register of Historic Places
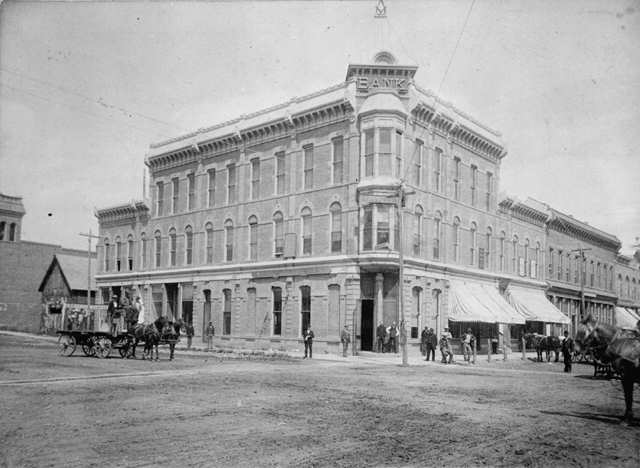
- 201 Linden, one home of the Poudre Valley Bank, later the Linden Hotel

- Location within Colorado
- Location: Roughly bounded by College Ave., Mountain Ave., and Pine, Willow, and Walnut Sts., Fort Collins, Colorado
- Coordinates: 40.589444°N 105.074167°W
- Area: 26 acres (11 ha)
- Architect: multiple
- Architectural style: Late Victorian, Romanesque
- NRHP reference No.: 78000871
- Added to NRHP: August 2, 1978

Old Town Fort Collins, in Fort Collins, Colorado, is a historic district which was listed on the National Register of Historic Places in 1978. By roughly the same official name, "Old Town Historic District", it is also the name of an overlapping, larger, local landmark historic district designated in 1972, and "Old Town" is informally a term for a much larger area.

The National Register district is a 26 acres (11 ha) area roughly bounded by N. College Ave. on the west, E. Mountain Ave on the south, and by Pine St., Willow St., and Walnut St. It included 38 contributing buildings, including many in Late Victorian or Romanesque Revival styles. The National Register listing makes included buildings eligible for grants to fund historically sensitive renovations.

The design standards district defined by the Fort Collins Historic Preservation Department's "Old Town Historic District" imposes restrictions on renovations or other changes, and also provides financial incentives, as does its "River District", which overlaps and extends to the north and east to the Cache La Poudre River.

According to Fort Collins Coloradoan writer Eric Larson, "These districts help guide and protect the look and feel of Old Town as it branches away from Old Town Square, the place where, if you're not at a brewery, you're probably taking visitors to for the quintessential Fort Collins experience."

The National Register district includes:

- the "Old Town Square" on Linden St.
- Avery Block (1880 - 1897), two-story brick building, constructed in three sections, at northeast corner of College and Mountain Avenues, at the southwest corner of the district. It was built for Franklin C. Avery, the businessman who brought merino sheep to Colorado. This was designed by "pioneer architect" Montezuma Fuller, who was originally a carpenter and became Fort Collins' first (and only, for a while) architect. The Avery Block "is by far his most outstanding structure." (See photos #17, 18, 23, 24, and 25 of 80 in NRHP document.)
- Northern Hotel / Walnut Hotel (1905), 166-180 North College Avenue (and on Walnut Avenue), a four-story Italianate brick building, also owned by Franklin C. Avery. (see photo #15 of 80)
- Union Pacific Railroad Depot, a one-story stretcher bond brick building, with a center higher structure and two wings, on north side of Jefferson St. at Pine St. (photo 31 and 40)
- Fort Collins Freight Depot, a one-story stretcher bond brick building
- Antlers Hotel (1902), built by Rev. Father G. Joseph LaJeunesse of St. Joseph's parish, 222 Linden St. (photo 1 and 55 of 80)
- Miller Block (1888), 162 Linden St. a red sandstone building built for Danish-born saloonkeeper Frank C. Miller. Built by John F. Colpitts it was the first building in Colorado "to employ the Howe Truss which supports the ceiling from the roof, leaving the first floor free of any posts." (photos 3, 9, 53, 70, 77 of 80)
- Red Garter, 117 Linden St. (photos 12 and 13 of 80)
- Black's Glass, 115 Linden (photos 14 and 15 of 80)
- Linden Hotel, 201 Linden, at Linden & Gardner (photos 46, 48 and 49 of 80), one home of the Poudre Valley Bank
- LaCourt Hotel, 232 Pine St. (photo 22 of 80)

A great deal of detailed history explains the significance of the district, but more a more general view is summarized in the 1977 NRHP nomination:

Fort Collins came into being on the site of an abandoned military post during a period of western colonization promoted by land companies, following the Civil War, as men lured by the romance of the West and the practicalities of a new homestead act took up land at the base of the Rockies. The agriculturalists who settled such communities may not have been as flamboyant as their miner counterparts in the hills, but they were equally daring and hardy. They endured hardships of a different type as they faced natural dangers such as blizzards, droughts, and grasshopper plagues.

The Fort Collins Old Town District is a reminder of this type of western settlement for it was established by people who purchased lands from a real estate company in order to ward off the loneliness of the prairies, to profit by the experience and expertise of their new neighbors, and to furnish their families with social amenities that were long in coming to communities situated farther east on the Great Plains. The Old Town District demonstrated how these people settled a new area and used local materials to decorate it with styles current in the East, as they created a substantial, as well as unique, latter 19th-century American community.

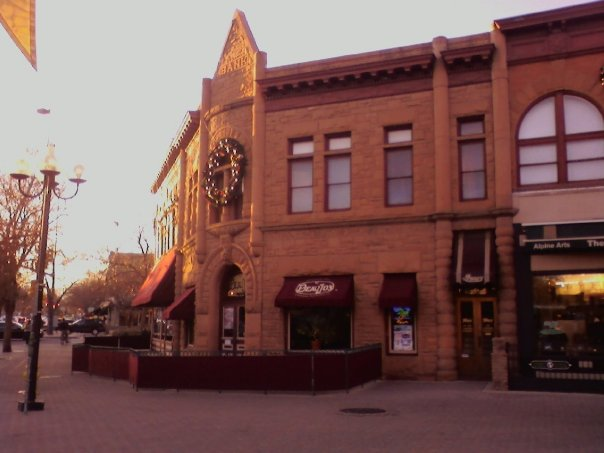
Building 1A of Avery Block, at Old Town Square, on E. Mountain Avenue, just off College, in 2012, then hosting BeauJo's pizza restaurant, which has since moved.

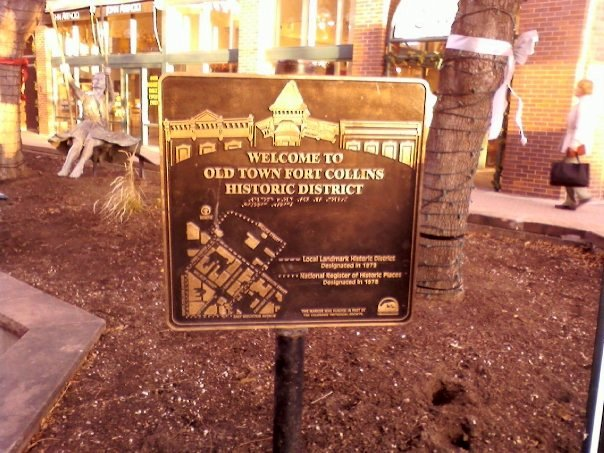
Sign indicating overlap of the historic district and a local improvement district

Note: Unlike other History Colorado webpages about National Register-listed places, the History Colorado webpage titled "Old Town Fort Collins" does not describe the district, as of September 2022. Instead it describes an annual homes tour of numerous places outside the district.

Also, The Elizabeth Hotel, whose website asserts that "it is in the heart of Old Town Fort Collins", is not included in the National Register-listed district, but is adjacent to its southeast corner. It is however inside the local landmark historic district.
