= Henry K. and Mary E. Shaffer House =

Historic house in Colorado, United States

- U.S. National Register of Historic Places
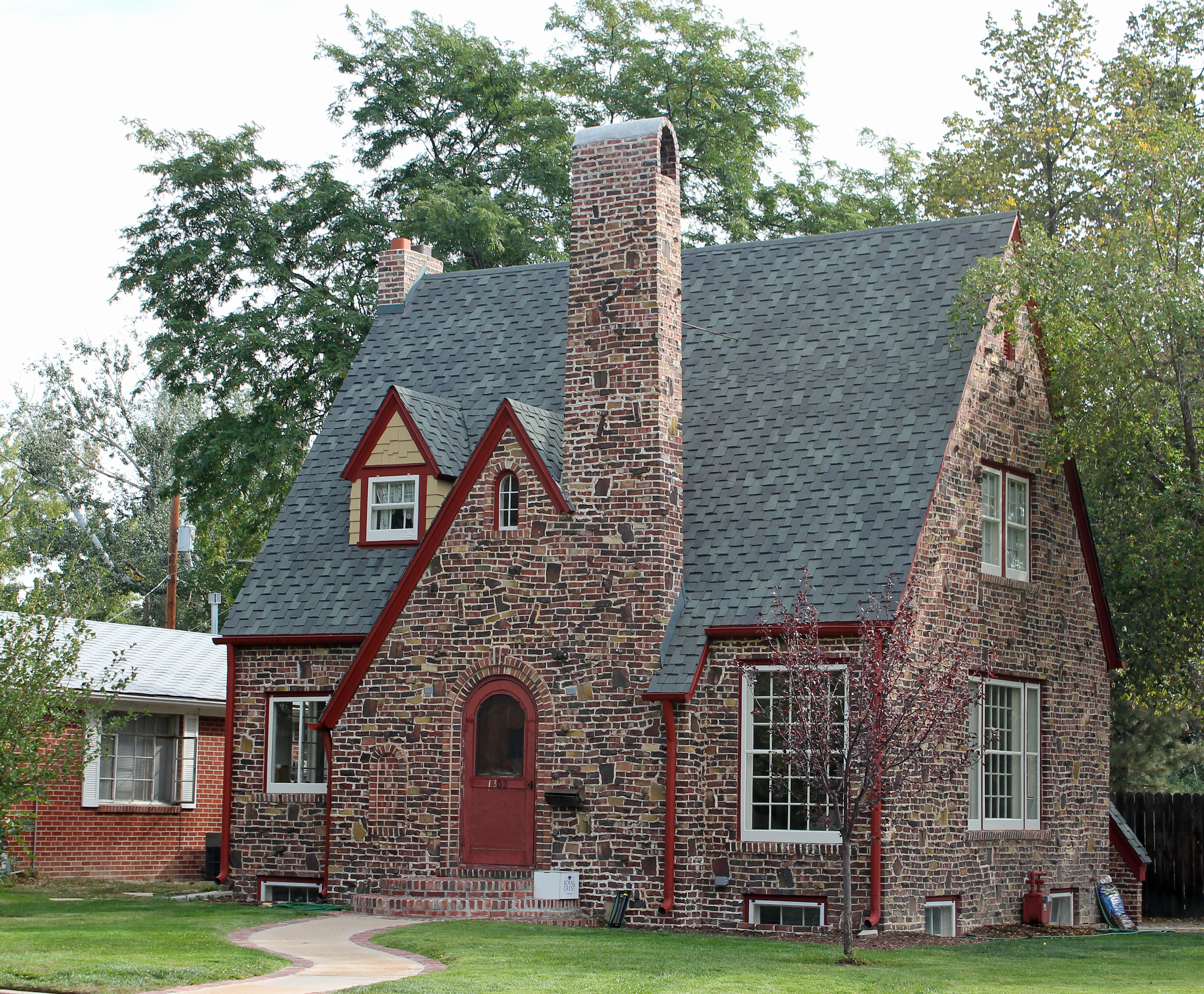

- Location within Colorado Location within the United States
- Location: 1302 N. Grant Ave., Loveland, Colorado
- Coordinates: 40.40600°N 105.07892°W
- Area: less than one acre
- Built: 1928-29
- Built by: Henry K. Shaffer
- Architect: Mary E. Shaffer
- Architectural style: English-Norman
- NRHP reference No.: 06001219
- Added to NRHP: January 9, 2007

The Henry K. and Mary E. Shaffer House in Loveland, Colorado, United States, is an English-Norman cottage which was built in 1928–1929. It was designated a City of Loveland Historic Landmark in 2006 and was listed on the National Register of Historic Places in 2007.

It is deemed "an excellent example of the English-Norman style, a modest simplified version of the Tudor Revival style. Elements of this style found on the house include a steeply pitched roof, brick walls, multi-pane casement windows, prominent exterior chimney, and the "catslide gable" on the façade with an arched entry."

It was home of Henry K. and Mary E. Shaffer, who were both born in Kansas and married in Kansas in 1911. It was built by Henry K. Shaffer, a building contractor. It was designed by Mary E. Shaffer. Their daughter, Ruth (Shaffer) McEwen related that Mary had designed the house "likely relying on plans adapted from architectural digests and popular magazines. To save money, and to give the house distinction, Mary sought out 'clinker bricks' from a Loveland brickyard, collecting an assortment of odd-sized and different colored bricks that were used in the home's construction. As a result, it features a unique appearance, with bricks of various hues, sizes and patterns laid at odd angles, and occasionally projecting, offsetting the primary brick courses which are laid in running bond."

More details recalled by Ruth McEwen included: "A Mr. Grubb was responsible for the excavation work, while her father laid the unusual brick walls. A person named Jimmy Dotts built the fireplace while the Riney Brothers did the interior plastering. Ruth also recalled that her father put up the wood lath for the plaster, and that she and her brother and sister helped plaster the closets."
