= Lost Lake Trail =

- U.S. National Register of Historic Places
- Location within Colorado Location within the United States
- Nearest city: Estes Park, Colorado
- Area: 10.9 acres (4.4 ha)
- Built: 1934
- Architect: Allison van V. Dunn
- Architectural style: Late 19th and Early 20th Century American Movements, Rustic
- MPS: Rocky Mountain National Park MPS
- NRHP reference No.: 08000126
- Added to NRHP: March 5, 2008

The Lost Lake Trail near Estes Park, Colorado, also known as, or including, Sawmill Trail, is a 9-mile-long (14 km) trail through what is now Roosevelt National Forest and then through what is now Rocky Mountain National Park (RMNP).

The trail was built in 1934. It was designed by Allison van V. Dunn of the National Park Service.

The 4.5-mile portion of the trail within RMNP was listed on the National Register of Historic Places in 2008. The listing included 10.9 acres (4.4 ha) and a contributing structure having Late 19th and Early 20th Century American Movements and Rustic architecture.
