= Flattop Mountain Trail =

- U.S. National Register of Historic Places
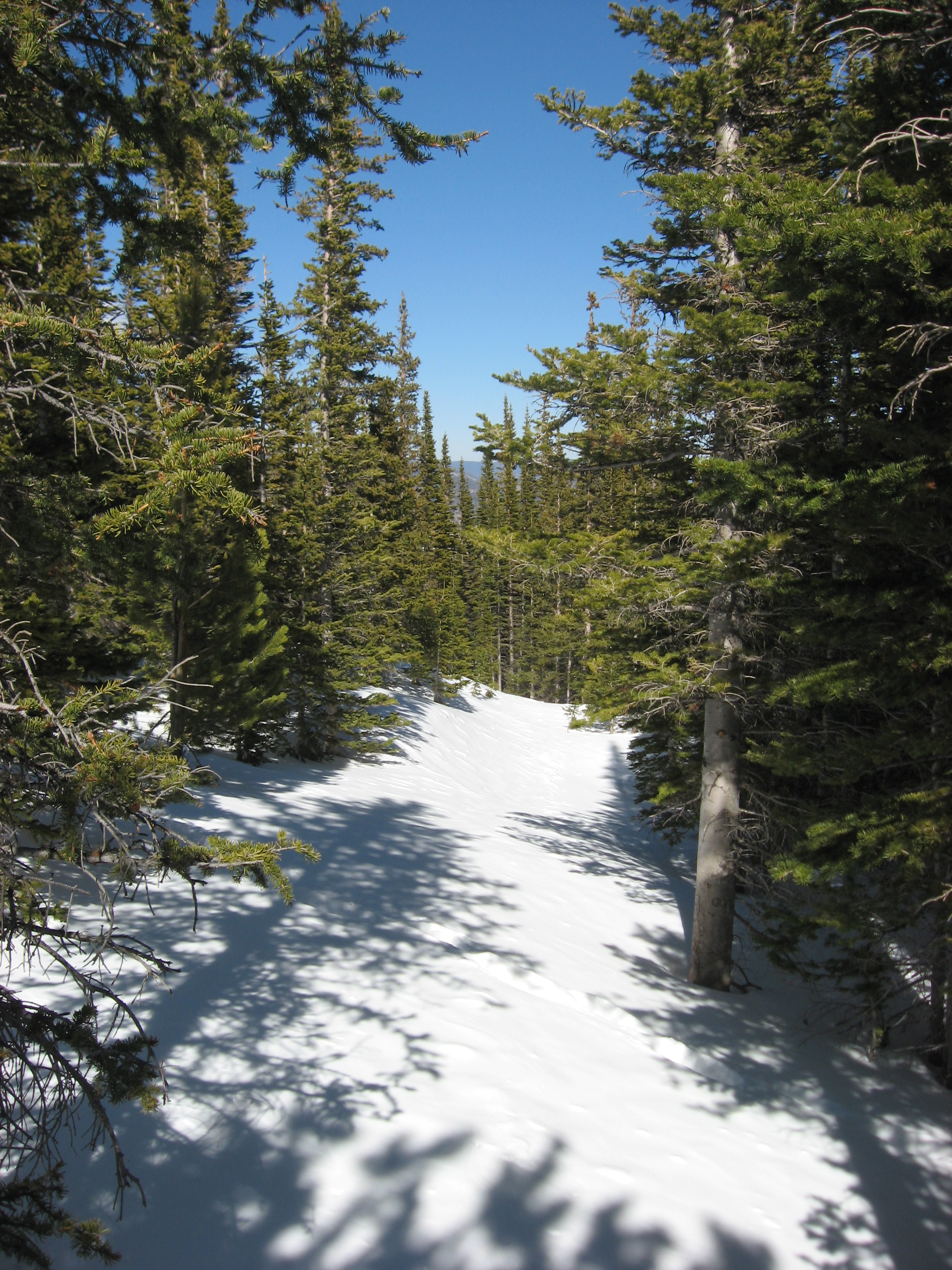
- Along the trail at nearly 11,000 feet

- Location within Colorado Location within the United States
- Nearest city: Estes Park, Colorado
- Built: 1925
- Architect: National Park Service; Civilian Conservation Corps
- MPS: Rocky Mountain National Park MPS
- NRHP reference No.: 07000999
- Added to NRHP: September 27, 2007

The Flattop Mountain Trail, also known as the Grand Trail or the Big Trail, was built in 1925 in Rocky Mountain National Park in the Larimer County portion of the U.S. state of Colorado. Built in 1925, and rehabilitated in 1940 with Civilian Conservation Corps labor, it is listed on the National Register of Historic Places. The trail begins at 9500 feet of elevation at Bear Lake and climbs Flattop Mountain to a maximum elevation of 12,324 feet on the Continental Divide.

== See also ==
National Register of Historic Places listings in Larimer County, Colorado
