= Lake Haiyaha Trail =

- U.S. National Register of Historic Places
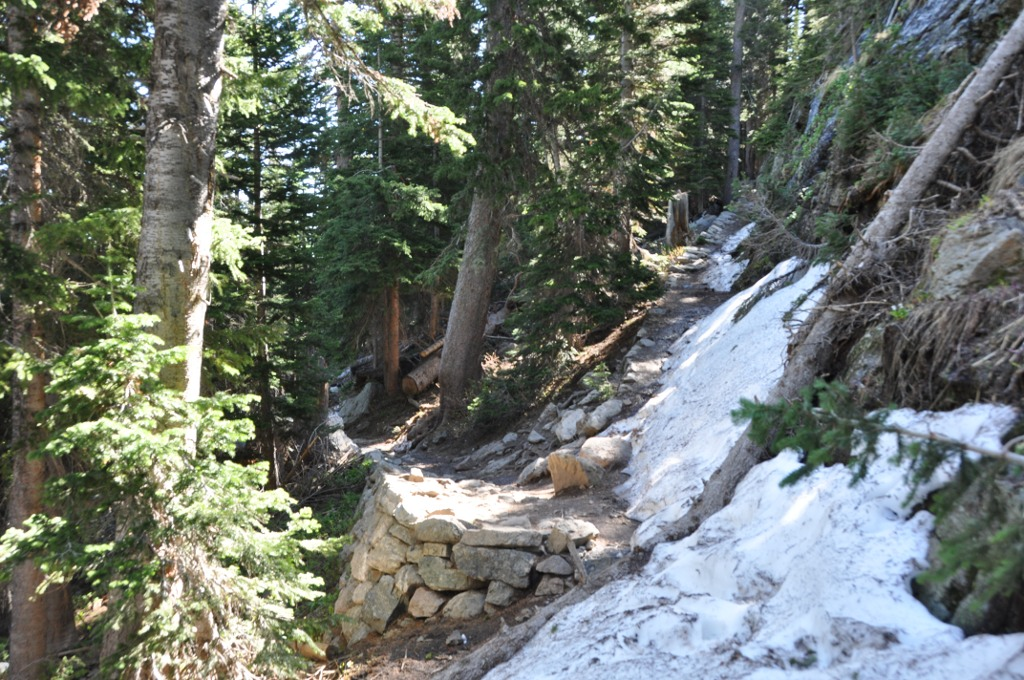
- Nearest city: Estes Park, Colorado
- Area: 36.4 acres (14.7 ha)
- Built: 1930–1935
- Architect: National Park Service; Dunn, Allison van V.
- Architectural style: Late 19th and Early 20th Century American Movements, Rustic
- MPS: Rocky Mountain National Park MPS
- NRHP reference No.: 08000125
- Added to NRHP: March 5, 2008

The Lake Haiyaha Trail is a historic hiking trail in Rocky Mountain National Park near Estes Park, Colorado. The trail is also known as, or subsumes, Nymph Lake Trail and Dream Lake Trail. It goes from Bear Lake up past Nymph Lake, then past Dream Lake, up to Lake Haiyaha.

The trail was built between 1930 and 1935 by landscape architect Allison van V. Dunn of the National Park Service. It was listed on the National Register of Historic Places (NRHP) in 2008. The NRHP listing included 36.4 acres (14.7 ha) with one contributing structure.
