= North Inlet Trail =

- U.S. National Register of Historic Places
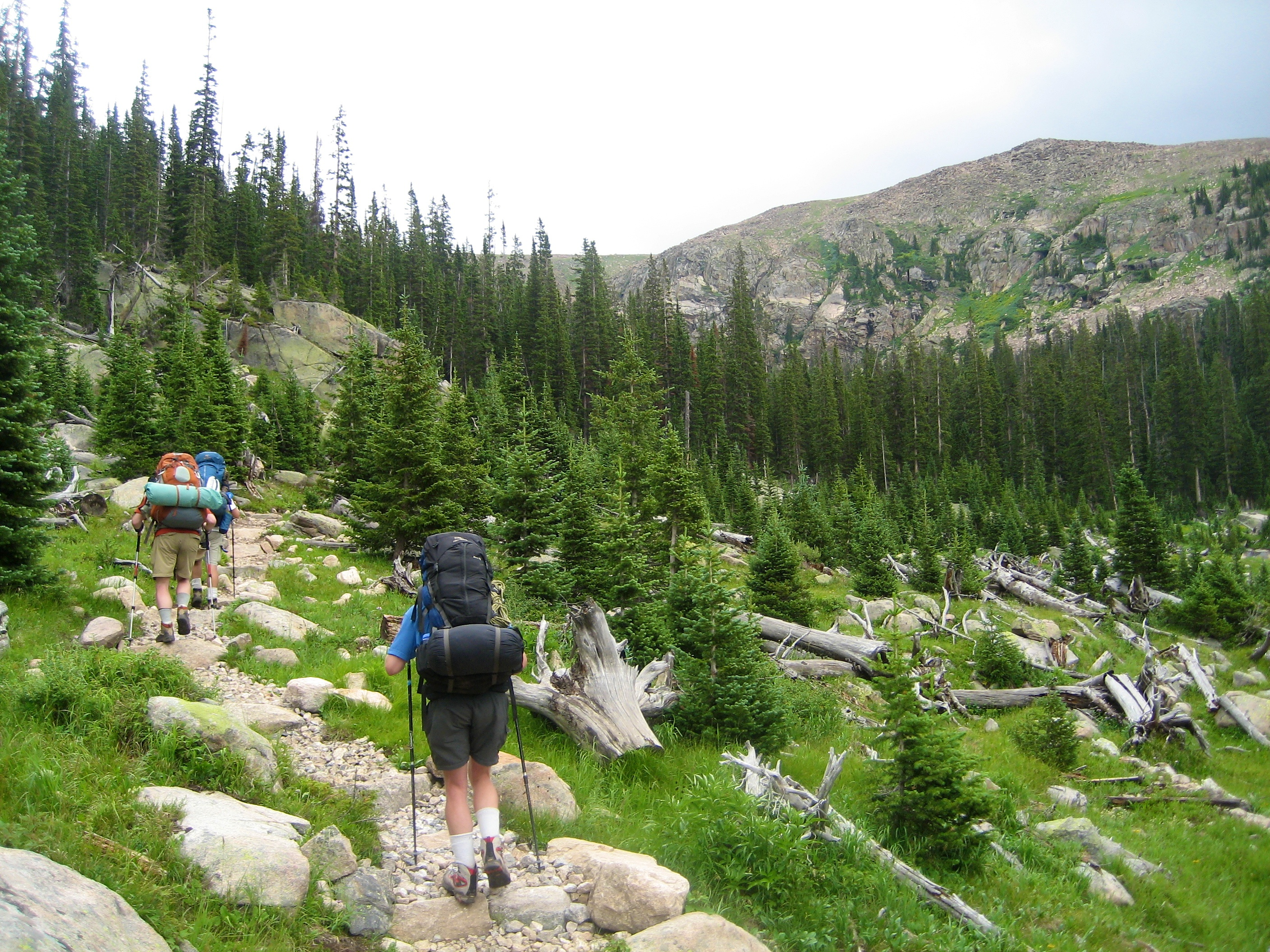

- Location within Colorado Location within the United States
- Nearest city: Grand Lake, Colorado
- Area: 34.7 acres (14.0 ha)
- Built: 1931
- Architect: National Park Service; Allison van V. Dunn; Bert L. Moses
- Architectural style: Late 19th and Early 20th Century American Movements, Rustic
- MPS: Rocky Mountain National Park MPS
- NRHP reference No.: 08000127
- Added to NRHP: March 5, 2008

The North Inlet Trail, in Rocky Mountain National Park near Grand Lake, Colorado, was built up from lesser pathways and rebuilt during 1926 to 1931 into its course that mostly continues to today. The trail runs from the North Inlet feeder into Grand Lake, up 11.5 miles to Flattop Mountain. Part or all of it has also been known as Grand Lake Trail, and as Flattop Trail. A 2.8 mile spur trail called Nokoni-Nanita Spur is also included.

Allison van V. Dunn, an NPS landscape architect of the National Park Service, arrived in 1929 and oversaw the final years of rebuilding.

It was listed on the National Register of Historic Places in 2008.
