= William Allen White Cabins =

Historic houses in Colorado, United States

- U.S. National Register of Historic Places
- U.S. Historic district
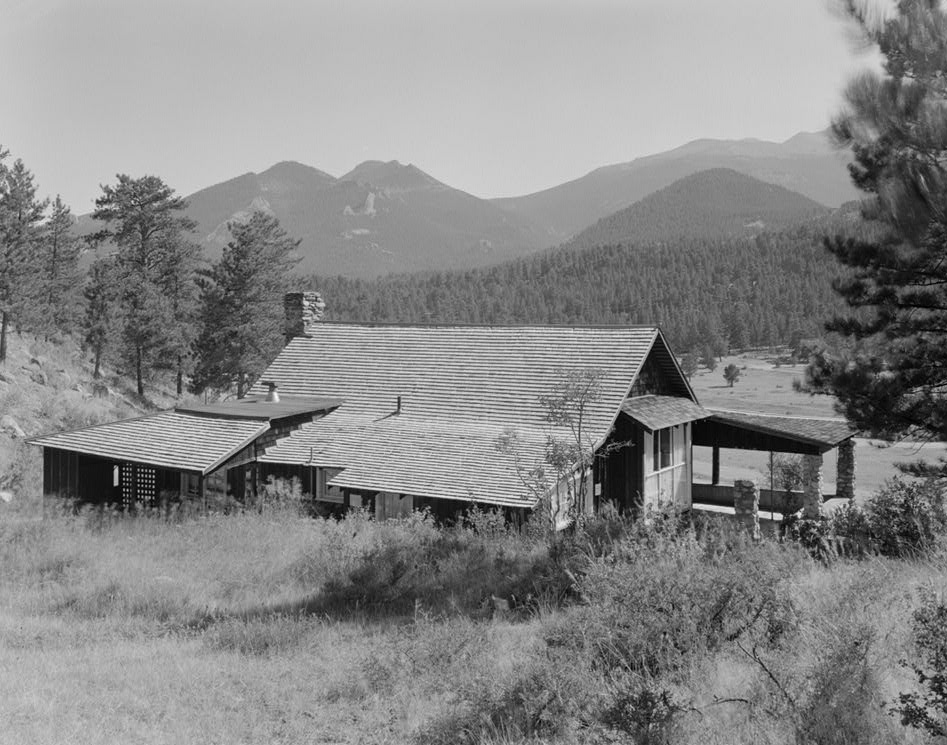

- Location within Colorado Location within the United States
- Nearest city: Estes Park, Colorado
- Coordinates: 40°21′22″N 105°34′55″W
- Built: 1912
- MPS: Rocky Mountain National Park MRA (AD)
- NRHP reference No.: 73001944
- Added to NRHP: October 25, 1973

The William Allen White Cabins are chiefly associated with newspaper editor William Allen White, who adopted what would become Rocky Mountain National Park as his summer residence from 1912 to his death in 1944. White had visited Estes Park, Colorado while in college, and had previously summered in Colorado Springs. In 1912, White and his wife Sallie purchased an 1887 cabin near Estes Park. The Whites expanded it the next year and built a privy, studio, and two guest cabins.

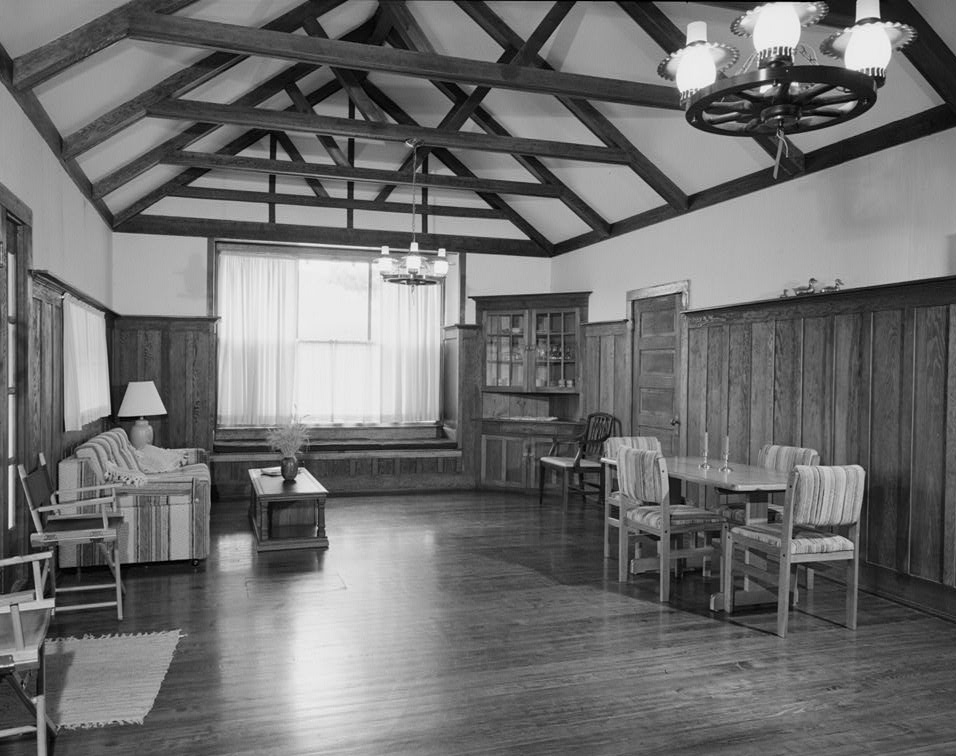
Main cabin interior

Visitors to the White place included Clarence Darrow, William Jennings Bryan, Nobel Peace Prize winner Jane Addams and U.S. presidential candidate and Chief Justice Charles Evans Hughes. After William White's death in 1944 the compound remained in the family until 1972, when the property was purchased by the National Park Service. The property was the first nomination to the National Register of Historic Places from Rocky Mountain National Park. The house was rehabilitated in 1976 for use by artists-in-residence.

== See also ==
National Register of Historic Places listings in Larimer County, Colorado
