= Fern Lake Trail =

- U.S. National Register of Historic Places
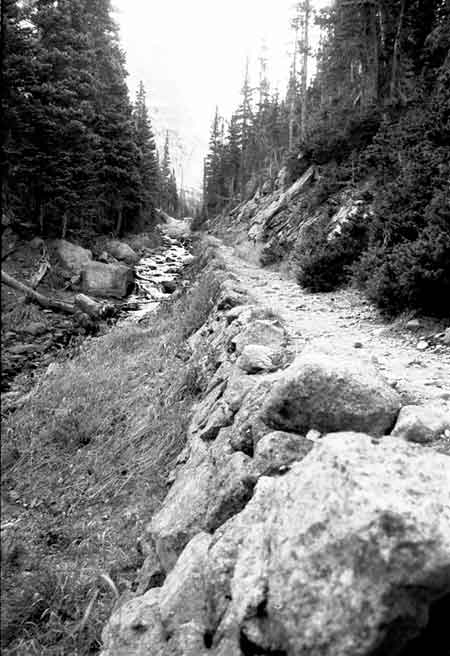

- Location within Colorado Location within the United States
- Location: Rocky Mountain National Park, Estes Park, Colorado
- Coordinates: 40°21′17.7″N 105°37′49″W
- Area: less than one acre
- Built: 1933
- Built by: Estes Park Protective & Improvement Association; Public Works Administration; Civilian Conservation Corps
- Architect: National Park Service
- MPS: Rocky Mountain National Park MPS
- NRHP reference No.: 05000074
- Added to NRHP: February 28, 2005

The Fern Lake Trail in Rocky Mountain National Park, Colorado, runs 4.8 miles (7.7 km) from Moraine Park in the eastern part of the park westward to Fern Lake, the first portion of the trail following the course of the Big Thompson River. The trail was first informally established in the late 1880s as a way to get to "The Pool," a wide spot in the Big Thompson where a small lodge predated the 1915 establishment of the park. The trail was improved by the Estes Park Protective and Improvement Association between 1907 and 1912, with a new bridge at The Pool. Two years later the trail was rebuilt to maintain no more than a 10% grade and to provide better access to Fern and Marguerite Falls. In the 1920s Fern Lake became a popular winter destination for skiing, complete with a lodge. From 1933 the trail was rebuilt over three years with Civilian Conservation Corps labor, building retaining walls and adjusting the trail's alignment.

The Forest Inn at The Pool closed in 1951, and Fern Lake Lodge closed in 1960. Folksinger Judy Collins and her then-husband Peter Taylor ran the lodge in the summer of 1958, welcoming hikers a respite from the trail. It was demolished by the Park Service in 1968 as they eliminated concessions within the park. The trail is notable for its association with early tourism development in the park and for its Civilian Conservation Corps-executed construction. The Fern Lake Trail was listed on the National Register of Historic Places on February 28, 2005.
