= Specimen Mountain =

Mountain in Colorado, United States

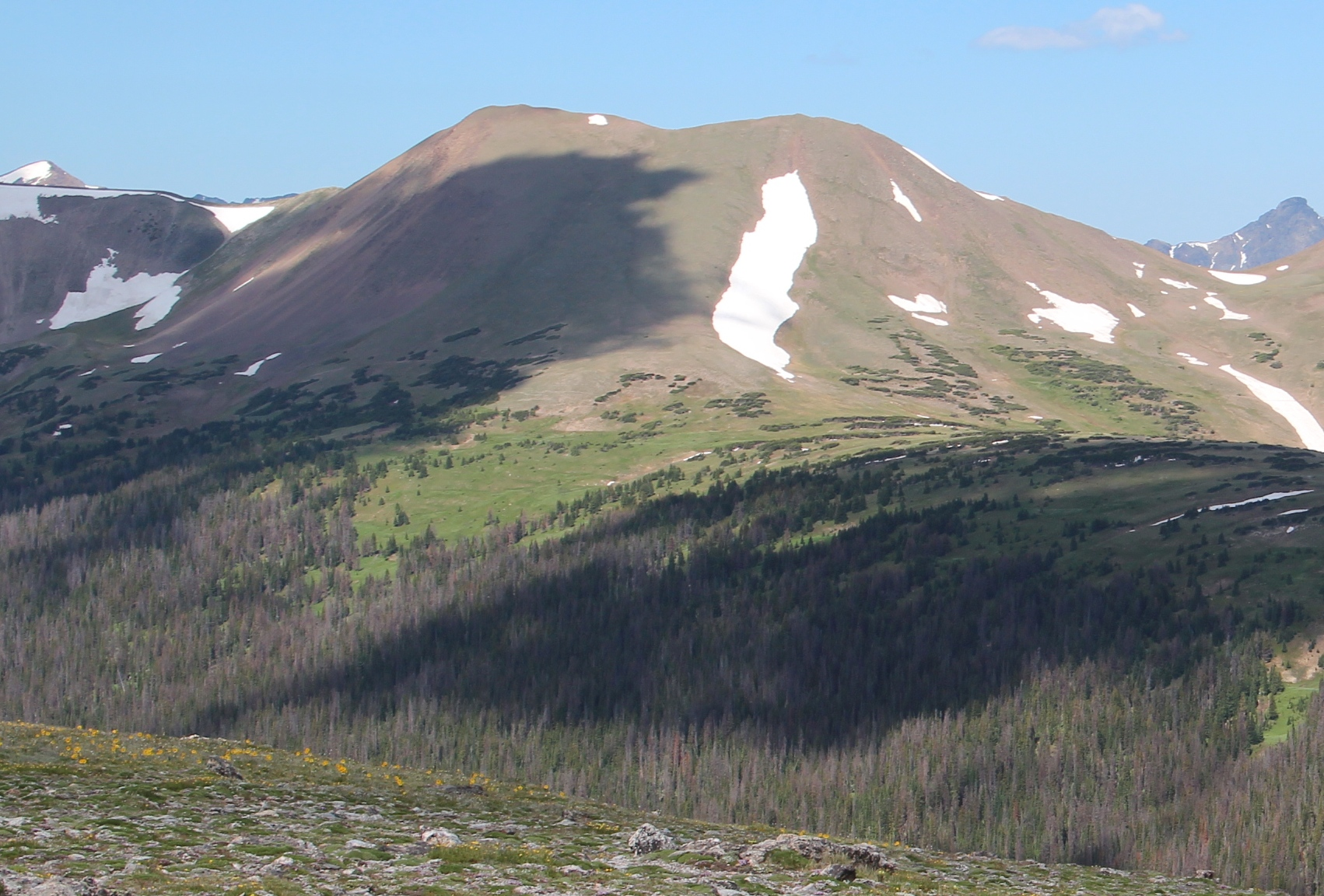
- Specimen Mountain viewed from the Alpine Visitor Center

Highest point
- Elevation: 12,494 ft (3,808 m)
- Prominence: 1,731 ft (528 m)
- Isolation: 4.70 mi (7.56 km)
- Listing: Colorado prominent summits
- Coordinates: 40°26′41″N 105°48′31″W

Geography
- Location within Colorado
- Location: Rocky Mountain National Park, Continental Divide between Grand and Larimer counties, Colorado, United States
- Parent range: Front Range
- Topo map(s): USGS 7.5' topographic map Fall River Pass, Colorado

Specimen Mountain, elevation 12,494 ft (3,808 m), is a summit in the Front Range of northern Colorado. The mountain is north of Milner Pass in Rocky Mountain National Park.

== Historical names ==
- Geode Mountain
- Mountain Smokes
- Specimen Mountain – 1932

== Geology ==
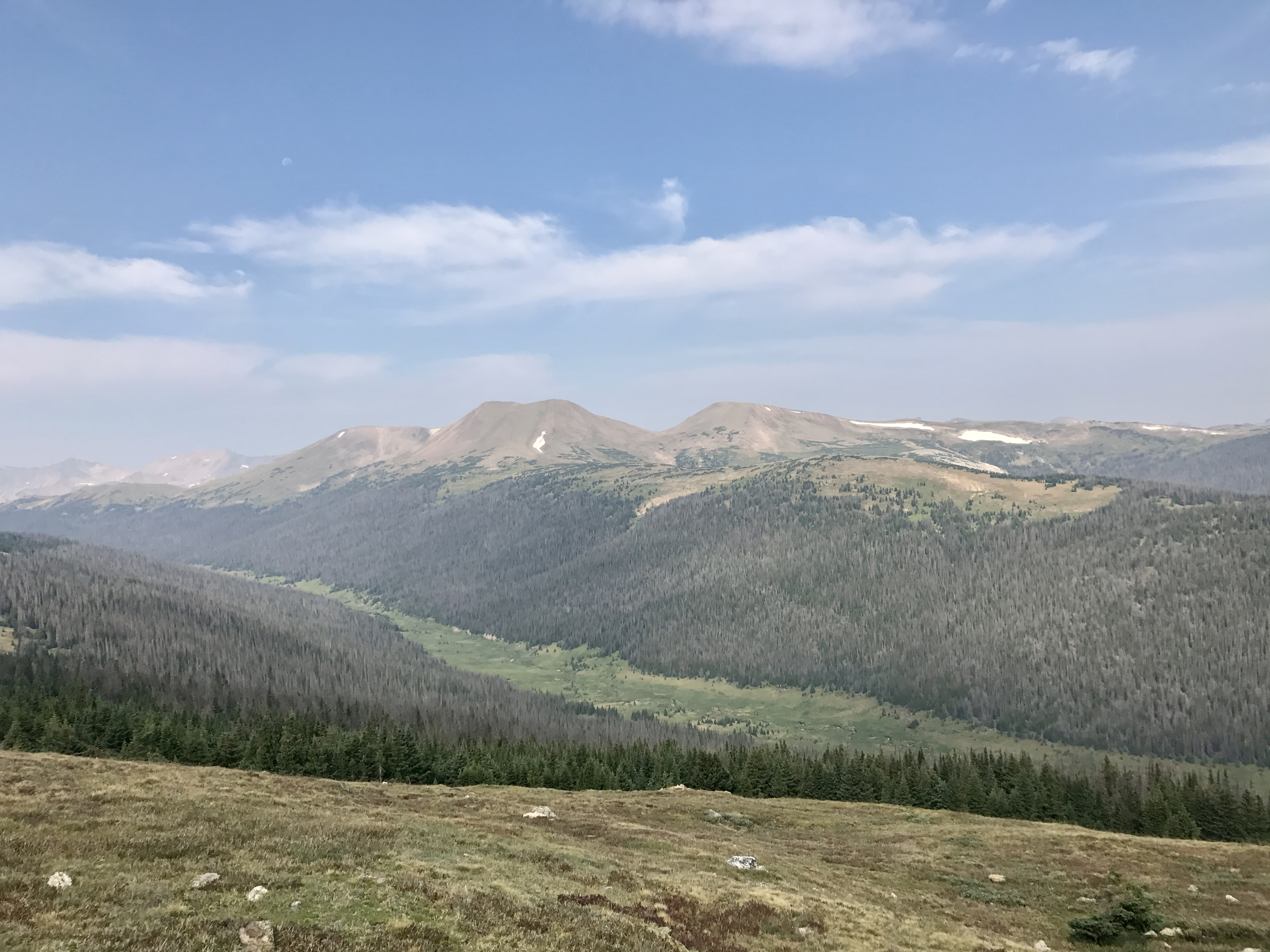
Specimen Mountain (center) viewed from the east on Trail Ridge Road near the Medicine Bow Curve

Specimen Mountain is a red-tinted, extinct volcano that was last active around 27 million years ago. At that time, it was probably more conical in shape and much higher than it is now. Roadcuts near Poudre Lake contain some of the yellowish ash its eruptions spewed out.

== See also ==
- List of Colorado mountain ranges
- List of Colorado mountain summits
  - List of Colorado fourteeners
  - List of Colorado 4000 meter prominent summits
  - List of the most prominent summits of Colorado
- List of Colorado county high points
