= Timber Creek =

Timber Creek or Timbercreek may refer to:

== Rivers ==
- Big Timber Creek, a stream in southwestern New Jersey, US
- Timber Creek (Bahamas), a river in the Bahamas
- Timber Creek (South Dakota), a stream

== Schools ==
- Timber Creek High School (Florida), a school in Orlando, Florida, US
- Timber Creek High School (Fort Worth, Texas), a school in Fort Worth, Texas, US
- Timber Creek Regional High School, a school in Erial, New Jersey, US

== Settlements ==
- Timber Creek, Northern Territory, a small town in Australia
- Timber Creek Township, Marshall County, Iowa, a township in Iowa, US
- Timber Creek Township, Nance County, Nebraska, a township in Nebraska, US
- Timbercreek Canyon, Texas, a village in Texas, US

== Other uses ==
- Timbercreek Asset Management, a Canadian real estate company

== See also ==
- Timber Creek Campground Comfort Stations, historic public toilets in Rocky Mountain National Park, US, listed on the NRHP
- Timber Creek Lodge, a 2016 Canadian reality TV show
- Timber Creek Road Camp Barn, a historic barn in Rocky Mountain National Park, US, formerly listed on the NRHP
- Timber Creek Review, a literary journal
