= Madera Canyon, Arizona =

Populated place in Santa Cruz County, Arizona

- Populated place
- Location within the state of Arizona Madera Canyon (the United States)
- Coordinates: 31°43′30″N 110°52′48″W
- Country: United States
- State: Arizona
- County: Santa Cruz
- Elevation: 4,911 ft (1,497 m)
- Time zone: UTC-7 (Mountain (MST))
  - Summer (DST): UTC-7 (MST)
- Area code: 520
- FIPS code: 04-43710
- GNIS feature ID: 36713

Madera Canyon is a formerly populated place situated in the Santa Rita Mountains of Santa Cruz County, Arizona, United States. It has an estimated elevation of 4,911 feet (1,497 m) above sea level. It is located within a canyon of the same name, Madera Canyon, in the Coronado National Forest.

All homes built on U.S. National Forest property were evicted and demolished between 1984 and 1991 for the development of an improved campground.

== History ==
In 1911, a Tucson businessman formed a group of backers who built several cabins in the canyon on land leased from the United States Forest Service (USFS). Over the next few years, the roads were improved, automobiles came into use and Madera Canyon became a popular summer destination. Moreover, under the 1915 Occupancy Permits Act, the USFS had encouraged construction of recreational residences (summer cabins). In 1922, the Santa Rita Trails Resort was built. The original lodge later burned down, but in 1929 it was rebuilt as a year-round resort with cottages, cabins, a restaurant, a general store, a gas station and a post office. In the 1930s, Madera Canyon was home to a Civilian Conservation Corps camp. Many of the rock walls they built still exist.

The USFS continued to develop utilities and improve roads, but in the 1960s, ceased issuing new building permits. Some of the privately built summer cabins had become year-round homes, increasingly for retirees. There was concern that the impact of homes in the canyon led to erosion, sewage, and water supply problems. However, the unimproved picnic areas were also considered a source of pollution. Entering the 1970s, USFS policy shifted further to public use, repurposing and "re-wildernessing" the canyon for camping and hiking. Over fifty private cabins on public land were evacuated and demolished between 1984 and 1991. The few remaining homes in Madera Canyon are on private land.
