= Timber (disambiguation) =

Timber is the term common in the United States and Canada for unprocessed wood, or in other countries for processed wood called lumber in the United States and Canada.

Timber, The Timber or Timbers may also refer to:

== Films ==
- Timber (1941 film), a Walt Disney animated short
- Timber (1942 film), a feature-length film
- The Timber, a 2015 American Western

== People ==
- Dylan Timber (born 2000), Dutch footballer
- Jurriën Timber (born 2001), Dutch footballer
- Quinten Timber (born 2001), Dutch footballer
- Alex Timbers (born 1978), American writer and director
- Chauncey Yellow Robe (c. 1867–1930), Native American educator, lecturer, actor and activist nicknamed "Timber" in his youth
- Henry Wood (1869–1944), British orchestral conductor nicknamed "Timber"

== Places ==
=== United States ===
- Timber, Missouri, an unincorporated community
- Timber, Oregon, an unincorporated community
- Timber Mountain (San Bernardino County, California)
- Timber Ridge, Virginia and West Virginia
- Timber Hill, Missouri
- Timber Lake, near the city of Timber Lake, South Dakota
- Timber Creek (South Dakota)
- Timber Run, a river in New Jersey

=== Elsewhere ===
- Timber Peak, Victoria Land, Antarctica
- Timber Creek (Bahamas)
- Timber Island, Lake Ontario, Canada

== Songs ==
- "Timber" (Coldcut and Hexstatic song), 1998
- "Timber" (Pitbull song), a 2013 song by Pitbull featuring Kesha
- "Timber", a 1956 comedy single by Marty Brill
- "Timber", a 1978 single by Tavares
- "Timber!" (Bee Gees song), a 1965 song by the Bee Gees
- "Timber, I'm Falling in Love", written by Kostas and performed by Patty Loveless

== Other uses ==
- Portland Timbers (disambiguation), various professional soccer teams
- Timber School, the first school in Newbury Park, California
- Timber (video game), a 1984 arcade game by Bally Midway
- Timber, the pet wolf of the G.I. Joe character Snake Eyes
- the title character of Timber the Treasure Dog, a 2016 film
- Timber: Or Discoveries Made Upon Men And Matter, observations collected by playwright Ben Jonson (1640 posth.)

== See also ==
- Timbre, the quality of a musical note or sound or tone
- Timber Timbre, a Canadian folk rock band
