= National Register of Historic Places listings in Grand County, Colorado =

Location of Grand County in Colorado

This is a list of the National Register of Historic Places listings in Grand County, Colorado.

This is intended to be a complete list of the properties and districts on the National Register of Historic Places in Grand County, Colorado, United States. The locations of National Register properties and districts for which the latitude and longitude coordinates are included below, may be seen in a map.

There are 26 properties and districts listed on the National Register in the county. Another 3 properties were once listed but have been removed.

This National Park Service list is complete through NPS recent listings posted August 28, 2026.

== Current listings ==
	Name on the Register	Image	Date listed	Location	City or town	Description
1	Barger Gulch Locality B		March 25, 2009 (#08001377)	Address Restricted	Kremmling	
2	Byers Peak Ranch	Byers Peak Ranch	March 12, 2018 (#100002177)	1102 St. Louis Creek Rd. 39°56′41″N 105°49′36″W	Fraser vicinity	
3	Cozens Ranch House	Cozens Ranch House	June 9, 1988 (#88000709)	U.S. Highway 40 1½ miles south of Fraser; 39°55′56″N 105°47′24″W	Fraser	
4	Denver, Northwestern and Pacific Railway Historic District	Denver, Northwestern and Pacific Railway Historic District	September 30, 1980 (#80000881)	Southwest of Eldora; 39°54′52″N 105°41′10″W	Winter Park	Extends into Gilpin and Boulder counties, covering the railroad route over Rollins Pass.
5	Dutchtown		January 29, 1988 (#76002292)	Ditch Rd. 40°26′16″N 105°52′55″W	Grand Lake	Mining settlement high in the Neversummer Mountains
6	East Inlet Trail	East Inlet Trail	February 28, 2005 (#05000073)	Rocky Mountain National Park; 39°54′37″N 105°44′30″W	Estes Park	
7	Grand Lake Lodge	Grand Lake Lodge	July 22, 1993 (#93000663)	15500 U.S. Highway 34; 40°15′27″N 105°49′30″W	Grand Lake	
8	Grand River Ditch	Grand River Ditch	September 29, 1976 (#76000218)	North of Grand Lake; 40°25′10″N 105°52′12″W	Grand Lake	
9	Greenwood Lodge		November 29, 2010 (#10000948)	161 County Road 451; 40°12′58″N 105°53′22″W	Grand Lake	Log cabin built in 1932, in the United States Forest Service's Recreation Residence Program.
10	Holzwarth Historic District	Holzwarth Historic District	December 2, 1977 (#77000112)	North of Grand Lake on Trail Ridge Road; 40°22′13″N 105°51′28″W	Grand Lake	
11	Kauffman House	Kauffman House	November 21, 1974 (#74000579)	Northwestern corner of Pitkin and Lake Ave. 40°15′02″N 105°49′04″W	Grand Lake	
12	Kenjockety		November 30, 2011 (#11000858)	Junction of Elk and Willow Creeks; 40°18′42″N 106°02′58″W	Rand	
13	Little Buckaroo Ranch Barn	Little Buckaroo Ranch Barn	July 8, 2009 (#09000490)	20631 Trail Ridge Road in Rocky Mountain National Park; 40°21′22″N 105°51′23″W	Grand Lake	
14	Lulu City Site	Lulu City Site	September 14, 1977 (#77001562)	North of Grand Lake on Trail Ridge Rd. 40°26′30″N 105°50′50″W	Grand Lake	
15	Milner Pass Road Camp Mess Hall and House	Milner Pass Road Camp Mess Hall and House	July 20, 1987 (#87001130)	Milner Pass Rd. 40°25′02″N 105°48′57″W	Estes Park	
16	North Inlet Trail	North Inlet Trail	March 5, 2008 (#08000127)	Roughly along North Inlet and Hallett Creek to Flattop Mt. 40°15′50″N 105°47′22″W	Grand Lake	Extends into Larimer County
17	Shadow Mountain Lookout	Shadow Mountain Lookout	August 2, 1978 (#78000279)	Southeast of Grand Lake in Rocky Mountain National Park; 40°13′50″N 105°48′52″W	Grand Lake	
18	Shadow Mountain Trail	Shadow Mountain Trail	March 5, 2008 (#08000124)	Eastern side of Shadow Mountain Lake; 40°13′40″N 105°49′08″W	Grand Lake	
19	Smith-Eslick Cottage Court		August 4, 2016 (#16000491)	729 Lake Ave. 40°15′04″N 105°49′24″W	Grand Lake	
20	Timber Creek Campground Comfort Station No. 245	Timber Creek Campground Comfort Station No. 245	January 29, 1988 (#87001131)	Timber Creek Campground; 40°22′50″N 105°51′05″W	Estes Park	
21	Timber Creek Campground Comfort Station No. 246	Timber Creek Campground Comfort Station No. 246	January 29, 1988 (#87001132)	Timber Creek Campground; 40°22′49″N 105°51′00″W	Estes Park	
22	Timber Creek Campground Comfort Station No. 247	Timber Creek Campground Comfort Station No. 247	January 29, 1988 (#87001133)	Timber Creek Campground; 40°22′42″N 105°51′05″W	Estes Park	
23	Timberline Cabin	Timberline Cabin	January 29, 1988 (#87001136)	Fall River Rd. 40°26′30″N 105°44′37″W	Estes Park	Demolished.
24	Tonahutu Creek Trail	Tonahutu Creek Trail	March 5, 2008 (#08000130)	Roughly along Tonahutu Creek to Flattop Mountain; 40°19′10″N 105°46′32″W	Grand Lake	Extends into Larimer County
25	Trail Ridge Road	Trail Ridge Road	November 14, 1984 (#84000242)	Rocky Mountain National Park; 40°21′30″N 105°45′47″W	Grand Lake	Extends into Larimer County
26	E.C. Yust Homestead	E.C. Yust Homestead	October 29, 1982 (#82001019)	South of Kremmling off State Highway 9; 39°59′40″N 106°23′11″W	Kremmling	

== Former listings ==
	Name on the Register	Image	Date listed	Date removed	Location	City or town	Description
1	North Inlet Shelter Cabin		October 22, 1976 (#76000205)	February 27, 1987	6 miles east of Grand Lake in Rocky Mountain National Park	Grand Lake	Destroyed by avalanche in March or April 1986.
2	Timber Creek Road Camp Barn	Timber Creek Road Camp Barn	July 30, 1987 (#87001134)	January 28, 2022	Approximately 200 yards south of Columbine Lake Rd., 450 yards west of the Kawuneeche Visitor Center; 40°22′45″N 105°50′53″W	Estes Park	Destroyed by the East Troublesome Fire
3	Timber Creek Road Camp Storage Building		January 29, 1988 (#87001135)	February 11, 1992	Timber Creek Rd.	Rocky Mountain National Park	Collapsed

== See also ==
- List of National Historic Landmarks in Colorado
- List of National Register of Historic Places in Colorado
- Bibliography of Colorado
- Geography of Colorado
- History of Colorado
- Index of Colorado-related articles
- List of Colorado-related lists
- Outline of Colorado
