= Milner Pass Road Camp Mess Hall and House =

Historic building in Colorado, United States

- U.S. National Register of Historic Places
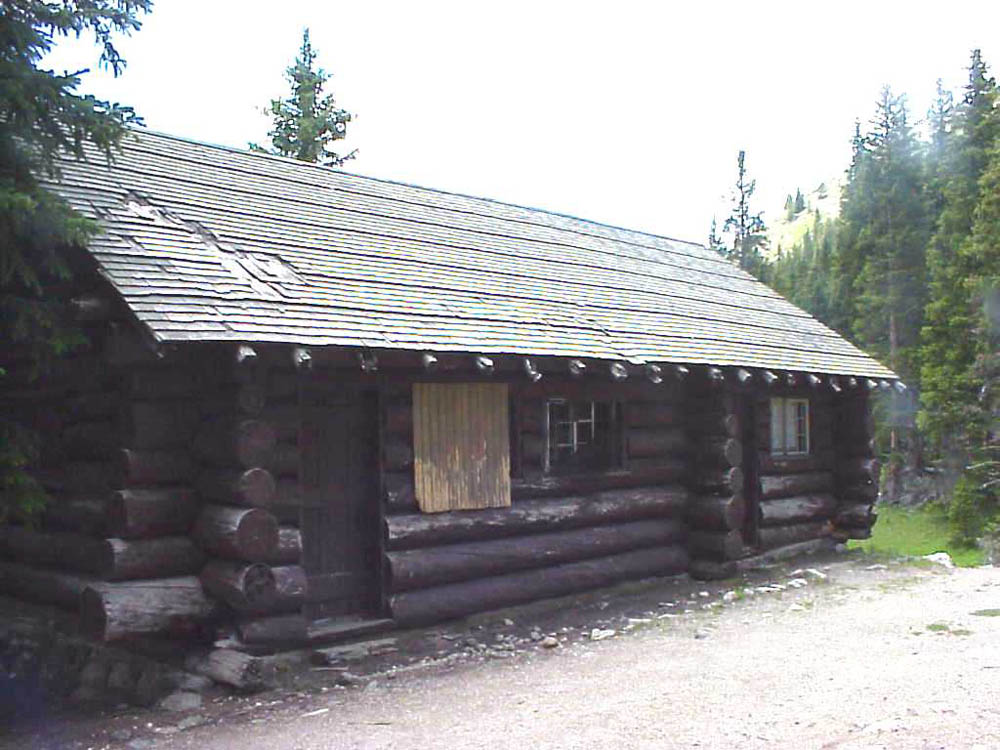

- Location within Colorado Location within the United States
- Nearest city: Estes Park, Colorado
- Coordinates: 40°25′2″N 105°48′57″W
- Area: less than one acre
- Built: 1926
- Architect: Daniel Ray Hull (National Park Service)
- Architectural style: NPS Rustic Architecture
- MPS: Rocky Mountain National Park MRA
- NRHP reference No.: 87001130
- Added to NRHP: July 20, 1987

The Milner Pass Road Camp Mess Hall and House was built in 1926 was built to support construction crews working on the new Trail Ridge Road in the vicinity of Milner Pass in Rocky Mountain National Park in 1926. The 35-by-18-foot (10.7 by 5.5 m) log structure was designed by Daniel Ray Hull of the National Park Service and represents one of the earliest examples of the National Park Service rustic style in the park. The interior is divided into three rooms. Its original use was as a dining facility and residence for Park Service personnel.

The Milner Pass Mess Hall was placed on the National Register of Historic Places on July 20, 1987.

== See also ==
- National Register of Historic Places listings in Grand County, Colorado
