= Fall River Pass =

Mountain pass in northern Colorado, USA

- Trail Ridge Store at Fall River Pass
- Interactive map of Fall River Pass
- Elevation: 11,796 feet (3,595 m)
- Traversed by: US 34

Third Approach
- Location: Rocky Mountain National Park, Larimer County, Colorado, U.S.
- Range: Front Range
- Coordinates: 40°26′26″N 105°45′17″W
- Topo map: USGS Fall River Pass

Fall River Pass (elevation 11,796 feet (3,595 m)) is a mountain pass in northern Colorado, in the Rocky Mountains of the western United States. It is located in the Front Range, within Rocky Mountain National Park. The pass is traversed by U.S. Highway 34 on Trail Ridge Road between Granby and Estes Park. However, as at Milner Pass on the Continental Divide, the road does not descend after reaching the pass from the west, but instead continues to climb along a side ridge; thus, neither pass is the high point on Trail Ridge Road, which crests at 12,183 feet (3,713 m) elevation, east of Fall River Pass, still within Rocky Mountain National Park. On the other hand, the old, largely unpaved, and one-way-uphill Fall River Road (see adjoining map) does have its summit at Fall River Pass, where it joins the modern highway for the descent to the west.

The Alpine Visitor Center, one of five visitor centers for Rocky Mountain National Park, is located at Fall River Pass. The highway has a moderately steep 6% grade on either side of this point.

== Climate ==
Willow Park is a weather station near the summit of Fall River Pass. Willow Park has a subalpine climate (Köppen Dfc), bordering on an alpine climate (ETH), with only two months averaging over 10°C.

Climate data for Willow Park, Colorado, 1991–2020 normals, 1988-2020 extremes: 10700ft (3261m)
Month	Jan	Feb	Mar	Apr	May	Jun	Jul	Aug	Sep	Oct	Nov	Dec	Year
Record high °F (°C)	63 (17)	74 (23)	73 (23)	81 (27)	85 (29)	89 (32)	93 (34)	87 (31)	82 (28)	78 (26)	69 (21)	61 (16)	93 (34)
Mean maximum °F (°C)	45 (7)	46 (8)	53 (12)	58 (14)	66 (19)	71 (22)	74 (23)	73 (23)	69 (21)	61 (16)	51 (11)	44 (7)	76 (24)
Mean daily maximum °F (°C)	28.5 (−1.9)	29.9 (−1.2)	38.1 (3.4)	42.8 (6.0)	51.4 (10.8)	60.1 (15.6)	65.9 (18.8)	63.4 (17.4)	57.5 (14.2)	46.2 (7.9)	34.6 (1.4)	27.1 (−2.7)	45.5 (7.5)
Daily mean °F (°C)	17.9 (−7.8)	18.8 (−7.3)	25.7 (−3.5)	30.2 (−1.0)	38.5 (3.6)	47.1 (8.4)	52.4 (11.3)	50.6 (10.3)	44.9 (7.2)	34.6 (1.4)	24.3 (−4.3)	16.8 (−8.4)	33.5 (0.8)
Mean daily minimum °F (°C)	7.2 (−13.8)	7.3 (−13.7)	13.1 (−10.5)	18.2 (−7.7)	26.0 (−3.3)	33.1 (0.6)	38.9 (3.8)	37.7 (3.2)	32.5 (0.3)	23.5 (−4.7)	14.3 (−9.8)	6.9 (−13.9)	21.6 (−5.8)
Mean minimum °F (°C)	−12 (−24)	−10 (−23)	−6 (−21)	2 (−17)	11 (−12)	26 (−3)	33 (1)	31 (−1)	20 (−7)	5 (−15)	−5 (−21)	−13 (−25)	−17 (−27)
Record low °F (°C)	−24 (−31)	−34 (−37)	−17 (−27)	−18 (−28)	−2 (−19)	11 (−12)	28 (−2)	20 (−7)	7 (−14)	−20 (−29)	−22 (−30)	−21 (−29)	−34 (−37)
Average precipitation inches (mm)	3.87 (98)	3.79 (96)	3.75 (95)	4.87 (124)	3.92 (100)	1.83 (46)	1.95 (50)	2.15 (55)	2.16 (55)	2.86 (73)	3.33 (85)	3.60 (91)	38.08 (968)
Source 1: XMACIS2
Source 2: NOAA (Precipitation)

== Picture gallery ==
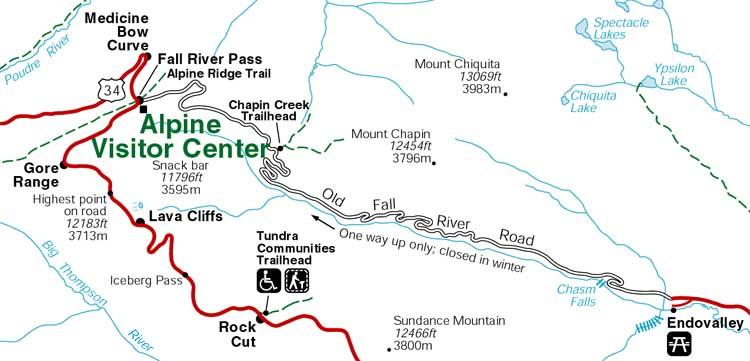
Map By USGS
2.3 Miles High

Creek At Fall River Pass
