= Coyote Valley =

Coyote Valley may refer to:

- Coyote Valley, California
- Coyote Valley, Colorado (Kawuneeche Valley)
