= Holzwarth =

Holzwarth is a surname. Notable people with the surname include:

- Alex Holzwarth (born 1968), German musician
- Oliver Holzwarth, German musician

== See also ==
- Holzwarth Historic District, a historic ranch in Colorado, United States
- Holzwarth gas turbine, an early form of gas turbine
