= Greenwood Lodge =

1932 lodge in Grand County, Colorado, US

- U.S. National Register of Historic Places
- Location within Colorado
- Location: 161 County Road 451, Grand County, Colorado, near Grand Lake, Colorado
- Coordinates: 40.21599°N 105.88946°W
- Area: 0.3 acres (0.12 ha)
- Built: 1932
- Built by: Lt. Col. James M. Hynes
- Architectural style: Rustic
- NRHP reference No.: 10000948
- Added to NRHP: November 29, 2010

Greenwood Lodge is a Rustic-style log cabin lodge which dates from 1932, in the Arapaho National Forest and Roosevelt National Forest in Grand County, Colorado, in the vicinity of Grand Lake, Colorado, US. It has also been known as Spence Cabin. The lodge was listed on the National Register of Historic Places in 2010.

== History ==
When this lodge was built, World War I was over and World War II had not yet started. Roads were improving and people started to be able to own cars, the U.S. Forest Service had invited the American public to explore outdoor recreation, especially in the west. The Greenwood Lodge was built with a special permit in order to be located on National Forest land, which was made possible due to the Occupancy Permit Act of 1915.

The lodge is a one-story log cabin with porch, located at 161 County Road 451 in Grand County, near Grand Lake. It is 32 by 32 feet (9.8 m × 9.8 m) in plan, designed by Lt. Col. James M. Hynes. The Hynes were Washington D.C. residents, and alongside his wife, Harriet, they designed this lodge as a summer home and retreat. Whole logs that were peeled with v-notching create the exterior walls, rubble masonry perimeter walls comprise the foundation, and native stone forms the centrally placed chimney. A front-gabled roof tops the building and green composition shingles originally sheathed the roof. A brown metal roof that matches the stain used on the logs and trim, replaced the composition shingles in 1983 to address wildfire safety concerns. The cabin is located on a hillock about 2 miles (3.2 km) west of Shadow Mountain Lake, the structure does not dominate the landscape. "The cabin sits at an elevation of 8,840 feet (2,690 m) and is located about 14 miles (23 km) north of the depot in Granby, Colorado, and 5.5 miles (8.9 km) west from the boat ramp in Grand Lake, Colorado." Originally, a lodgepole pine forest surrounded the site, however most of the trees around the lodge were removed in 2006 under the Forest Service special use permit requirements because of lodgepole beetle kill.

It was deemed significant as a good example of politics/government, entertainment/recreation, architecture and landscape by the United States Forest Service Recreation Residence Program, particularly its Rapid Development and Aggressive Promotion phase. The listing included a contemporary shed as a second contributing building. The "natural mounting setting" and the landscaping around the property were deemed contributing sites in the listing. Rock-lined paths and a low rubble masonry wall, built around 1965 were deemed non-contributing. The lodge has retained its historical integrity in terms of the location, design, setting, material, workmanship.

== See also ==
- National Register of Historic Places listings in Grand County, Colorado
