= Alpine Visitor Center =

Visitor center at Fall River Pass, Colorado

Coordinates: 40.4414°N 105.7538°W

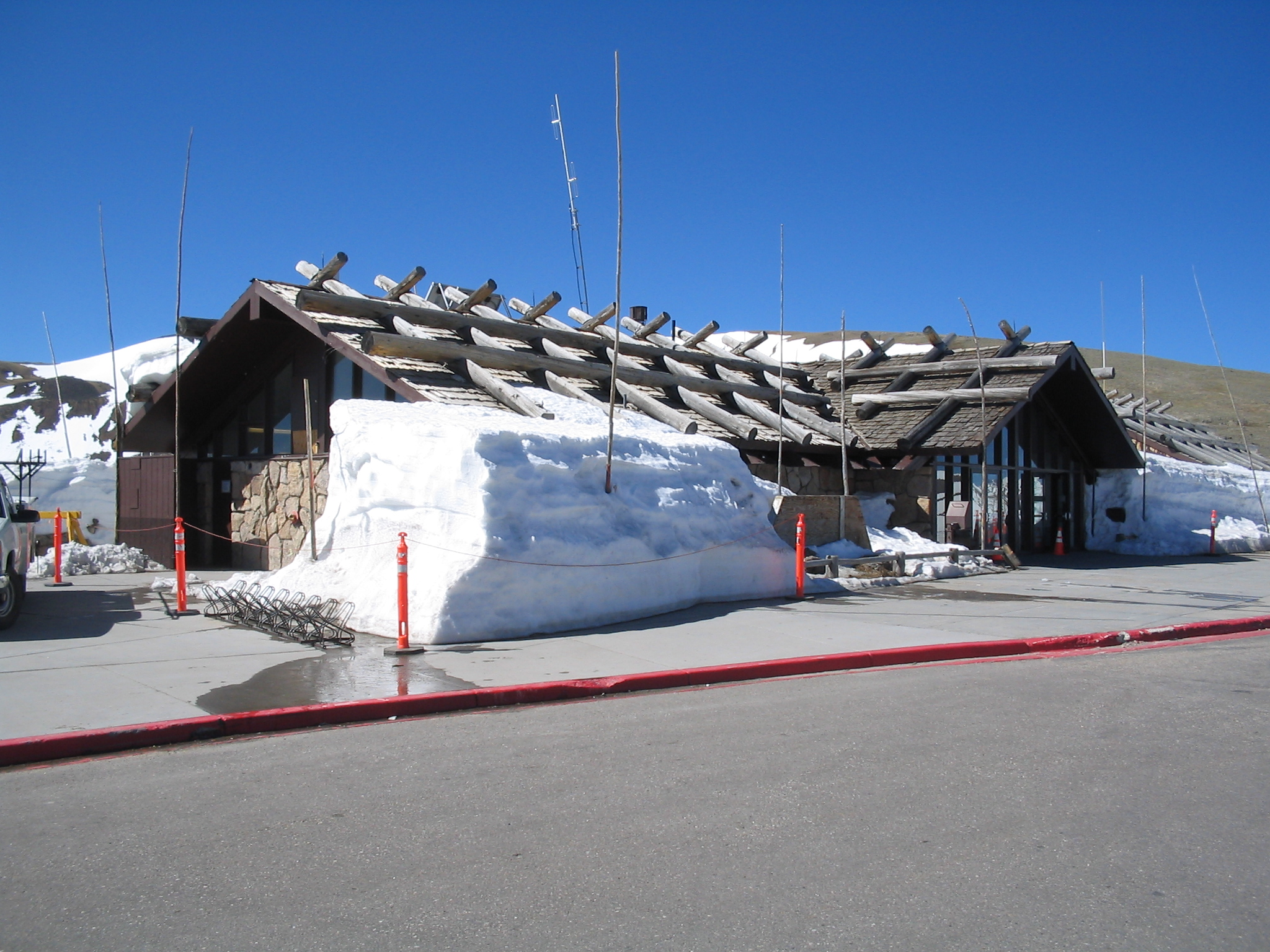
The visitor center in late May

Rocky Mountain National Park's Alpine Visitor Center is located at 11,796 feet (3,595 m) above sea level at Fall River Pass, one mile west of the highest point on Trail Ridge Road and four miles east of the Continental Divide at Milner Pass in the U.S. state of Colorado. It is the highest visitor center in the National Park System.

The Alpine Visitor Center includes restrooms, exhibits on the alpine tundra ecosystem, and a gift shop operated by the park's non-profit partner organization, the Rocky Mountain Conservancy. The visitor center opens around Memorial Day and closes around mid-October due to snow and the extreme winter environment. In mid-summer, the visitor center is also usually accessible by Old Fall River Road, a 9-mile dirt road open to one-way, uphill vehicle traffic.

Views from the Alpine Visitor Center include the Mummy Range, the Fall River Valley, and Trail Ridge to the east and the Never Summer and Medicine Bow ranges to the west and north. Hiking opportunities include the 1/4-mile round-trip Alpine Ridge Trail, commonly referred to as "Huffer's Hill," and the 8-mile round-trip Ute Trail to Milner Pass. Park Rangers provide park orientation and interpretive programs on the alpine tundra.

Additional gift and food services at Fall River Pass are provided at the concession-operated Trail Ridge Store and Cafe.
