= Dutchtown, Colorado =

- Dutchtown
- U.S. National Register of Historic Places
- Location within Colorado Location within the United States
- Nearest city: Grand Lake, Colorado
- Coordinates: 40.4378°N 105.8817°W
- Area: 15 acres (6.1 ha)
- Built: 1879
- MPS: Rocky Mountain National Park MRA
- NRHP reference No.: 76002292
- Added to NRHP: January 29, 1988

Dutchtown was a mining community high in the Never Summer Mountains of what is now Rocky Mountain National Park. The ghost town lies just below the timberline, and comprises the ruins of four cabins. The site was inhabited by squatters who were made unwelcome in Lulu City, in the Kawuneeche Valley a couple of miles to the east. Dutchtown existed to work the same silver deposits mined by Lulu City residents, but existed as a suburb of Lulu City to accommodate Dutch miners who were run out of town after a drunken affray in Lulu City. It existed from about 1879 to about 1884.

The town site was placed on the National Register of Historic Places on January 29, 1988.

== See also ==
- Bibliography of Colorado
- Geography of Colorado
- History of Colorado
- Index of Colorado-related articles
- List of Colorado-related lists
  - List of ghost towns in Colorado
  - List of National Register of Historic Places in Grand County, Colorado
  - List of protected areas of Colorado
- Outline of Colorado
