= Holzwarth Historic District =

Historic district in Colorado, United States

- U.S. National Register of Historic Places
- U.S. Historic district
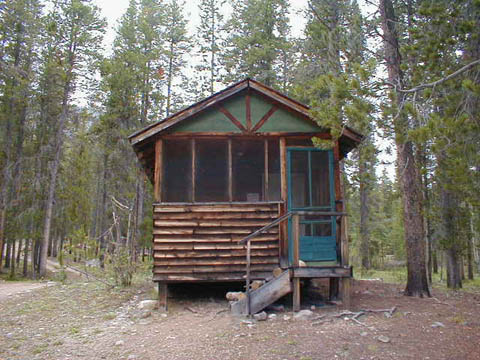

- Location within Colorado Location within the United States
- Nearest city: Grand Lake, Colorado
- Coordinates: 40°22′21″N 105°51′42″W
- Area: 72 acres (29 ha)
- Built: 1905
- Built by: John G. Holzwarth, Joseph Fleshuts
- MPS: Rocky Mountain National Park MRA (AD)
- NRHP reference No.: 77000112
- Added to NRHP: December 2, 1977

The Holzwarth Historic District comprises a series of cabins built by the Holzwarth family as a guest ranch inholding within the boundaries of Rocky Mountain National Park, at Grand Lake, Colorado. The Holzwarths made their homestead in the Kawuneeche Valley in 1917, two years after the establishment of the park, and received a patent on the homestead in 1923. Guest ranch use began in 1919 and continued until the ranch was purchased by The Nature Conservancy in 1974. The property was transferred to the National Park Service in 1975 for incorporation into the park. The district comprises a number of rustic cabins on the Colorado River. Operations existed on both sides of the river, first known as the Holzwarth Trout Ranch and later as the Never Summer Ranch. All but Joe Fleshut's cabin have been removed from the east side of the river.

John Holzwarth Sr. was a saloonkeeper in Denver. In 1916 Colorado enacted prohibition, leading Holzwarth to try homesteading at Grand River. The opening of the Fall River Road over the mountains to Estes Park in 1920 created an opportunity for Holzwarth to take in guests. The operation was taken over by John Holzwarth Jr., who ran it until 1973 when The Nature Conservancy bought the property.

Individual cabins include the original homestead, known as the Mama Cabin, the Rose Cabin, and other service buildings and guest cabins.

The Holzwarth Historic District was listed on the National Register of Historic Places on December 2, 1977.

== See also ==
- National Register of Historic Places listings in Grand County, Colorado
