= Daniel Ray Hull =

American landscape architect (1890–1964)

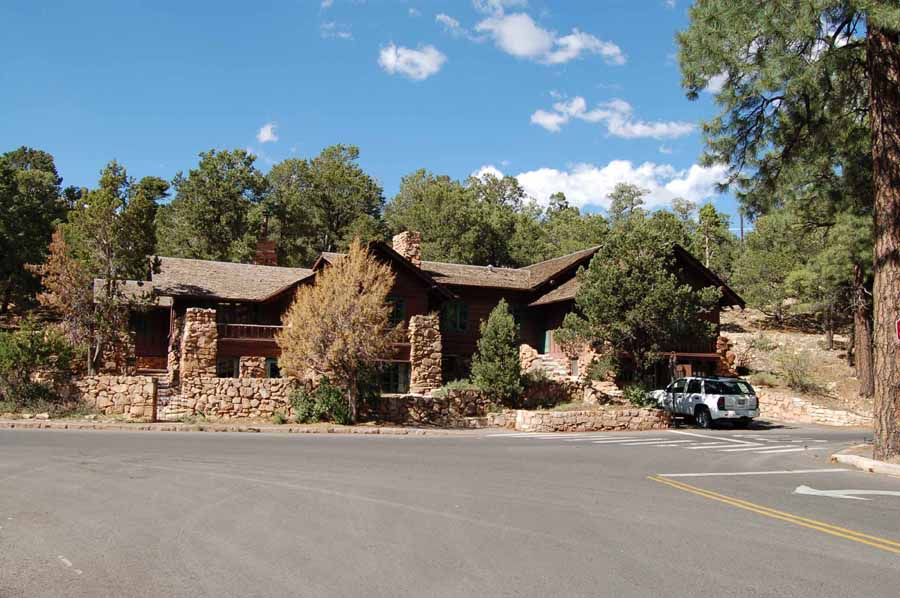
Grand Canyon National Park Superintendent's Residence, formerly the first Park Administration Building

Daniel Ray Hull (1890–1964), sometimes stated Daniel P. Hull, was an American landscape architect who was responsible for much of the early planning of the built environment the national parks of the United States during the 1920s. Hull planned town sites, designed landscapes, and designed individual buildings for the Park Service, in private practice, and later for the California State Parks. A number of his works are listed on the U.S. National Register of Historic Places.

== Early life and education ==
Hull was born in Lincoln, Kansas on April 29, 1890, the son of O. U. Hull, and studied landscape architecture and city planning at the University of Illinois Urbana-Champaign, receiving his degree in 1913. Hull was one of four students who studied intensively with civic planner Charles Mulford Robinson, who had published numerous texts on city planning. Hull received his Master of Landscape Architecture degree from Harvard University in 1914. Following a grand tour of Europe, Hull began to work in California. Hull had married Emma Dorothy Kammeger of Manhattan, Kansas., One of his first projects was the planning of the Montecito Country Estates subdivision in Montecito, California, working as well with Daniels, Osmont and Wilhelm in San Francisco. Daniels was at the time the Park Service's General Superintendent, and was in charge of a number of park improvement projects.

== Early career ==
Hull was a U.S. Army officer during World War I, planning Army facilities in the Cantonment Division. From the Army, Hull moved to the National Park Service, which had been established in 1916 to assist chief Park Service landscape architect Charles Punchard. Punchard died in 1920 and Hull took over his position at age 30. The largest project in the Park Service at the time was the re-planning of the Yosemite Valley, and Hull moved there to oversee the work, assisted by a friend from his studies at the University of Illinois, Paul P. Keissig. At the same time, Hull initiated overall master planning projects for Yellowstone, Sequoia, Grand Canyon, and Mesa Verde national parks, as well as an overall plan for Yosemite. Hull's plans for Yosemite embodied the informal, natural principals promulgated by Frederick Law Olmsted Jr. In addition to master planning, Hull worked on specific projects such as the administrative district at Mesa Verde and the Ash Mountain headquarters complex at Sequoia. In 1920 Hull was assigned the planning effort for Grand Canyon Village, a large-scale town planning exercise that sought to establish order at the previously haphazard South Rim of the Grand Canyon.

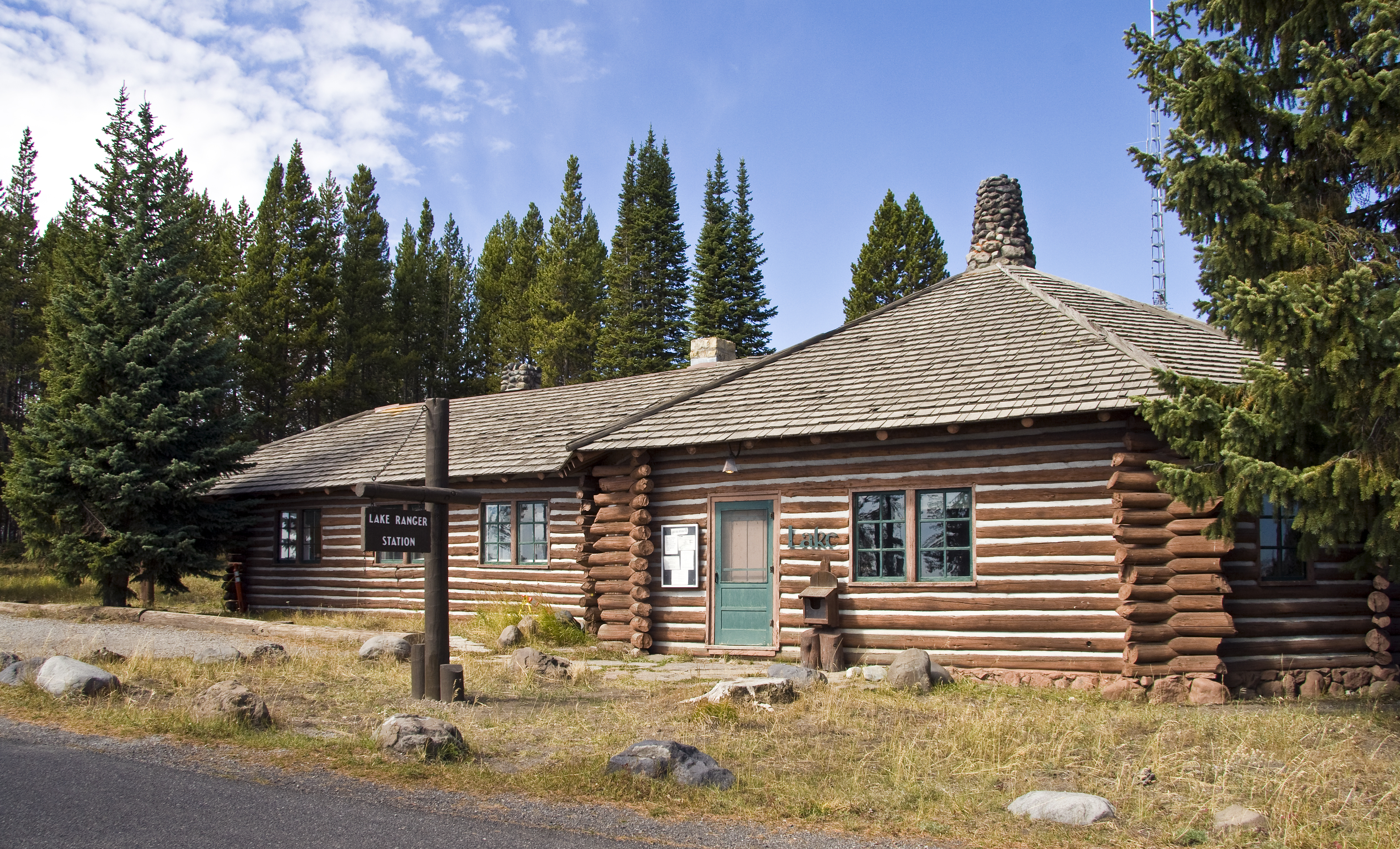
Lake Ranger Station, Yellowstone National Park

== National Park Service Rustic ==
At a smaller scale, Hull directed design efforts on new administrative structures at the Giant Forest in Sequoia, using local materials such as rubble stone, logs and wood shingles to achieve an intentionally rustic look, a style that quickly evolved into the National Park Service Rustic style. Under the direction of Hull, the Landscape Engineering Division followed up by planning the Grand Canyon Superintendent's Residence in 1921, where the style was more consciously rustic and less referential to the Swiss Chalet style that prevailed among park concession structures at Grand Canyon and elsewhere. In 1922 Hull designed three ranger stations for Yellowstone. Hull is specifically credited as architect on a number of buildings, indicating his versatility and technical ability.

As the volume of Park Service building grew, Hull directed architects who implemented rustic design principals, including Myron Hunt at Yosemite Village and Thomas Chalmers Vint, who would become Hull's deputy in 1923. Hull also worked with independent architects such as Gilbert Stanley Underwood and Herbert Maier. Hull became close friends with Underwood, whom he had known from Illinois and Harvard, and moved the Landscape Division to Los Angeles, subletting space in the Underwood and Company offices in 1923. Hull continued in private practice during the winter months, with declining involvement through 1926, when he was described as a part-time employee. In 1926 Hull was investigated by the Department of the Interior, who found that his shared offices with Underwood, and his work arrangements in which Hull in his public capacity reviewed and approved his own work as a private contractor, amounted to a conflict of interest. Park Service Director Horace Albright recommended that Hull be dismissed, but then-Assistant Director Arno B. Cammerer supported Hull until 1927, when it became apparent that Hull was not meeting his Park Service obligations. In 1927 the Landscape Division moved to San Francisco. Hull resigned and Vint took over the director's position.

== Later career ==
Following his departure from the Park Service, Hull kept up involvement in park design, working with architect Albert C. Martin on the 1927 Furnace Creek Inn in Death Valley and with Underwood on the Ahwahnee Hotel in Yosemite. Hull worked with Olmsted in 1927 on a survey of California for potential state park properties. During the Great Depression Hull approached Albright about a return to the Park Service, but was rebuffed by Albright. In 1934 Hull became Chief Landscape Engineer for the California State Park system. Hull published a design guide in 1944 that established the principles of the National Park Service Rustic style as a standard in the California parks. Hull died in Alhambra, California in 1964.

== Works ==
- Montecito Country Estates
- Administration Building at Giant Forest, Sequoia National Park
- Ash Mountain Administrative Complex, Sequoia National Park
- Yosemite Village, Yosemite National Park
- Lake Ranger Station, Yellowstone National Park
- Grand Canyon National Park Superintendent's Residence (1921), a National Historic Landmark
- Grand Canyon Village (1924), a National Historic Landmark District, master plan
- Old Faithful Lodge (1927), Yellowstone National Park, assisted Gilbert Stanley Underwood
- Ahwahnee Hotel (1927), Yosemite National Park, assisted Gilbert Stanley Underwood
- Fall River Pass Ranger Station, Fall River Pass, Estes Park, Colorado (Hull, Daniel P.), NRHP-listed
- Fern Lake Patrol Cabin, Fern Lake, Estes Park, Colorado (Hull, Daniel P.), NRHP-listed
- Mendocino Woodlands Recreational Demonstration Area, 11301 Little Lake Road, Mendocino, California (Hull, Daniel R.), NRHP-listed
- Milner Pass Road Camp Mess Hall and House, Milner Pass Road, Estes Park, Colorado (Hull, Daniel L.), NRHP-listed
- Work within Muir Woods National Monument, Muir Woods Road, Mill Valley, California (Hull, D.; Nickel, E.; Skidmore, L.), NRHP-listed
- Willow Park Patrol Cabin, Fall River Rd., Estes Park, Colorado (Hull, Daniel P.), NRHP-listed
- Willow Park Stable, Fall River Pass, Estes Park, Colorado (Hull, Daniel P.), NRHP-listed
- Work within Yosemite Valley, Yosemite National Park, Yosemite, California (Underwood, G.S.; Hull, D.; Vint, T.), NRHP-listed

Hull was also responsible for a number of buildings and landscape planning projects in Yellowstone, Glacier, Mount Rainier, Sequoia, Carlsbad Caverns, Rocky Mountain and Mesa Verde National Parks.
