= Grand Canyon National Park Superintendent's Residence =

Historic house in Arizona, United States

- Superintendent's Residence
- U.S. National Register of Historic Places
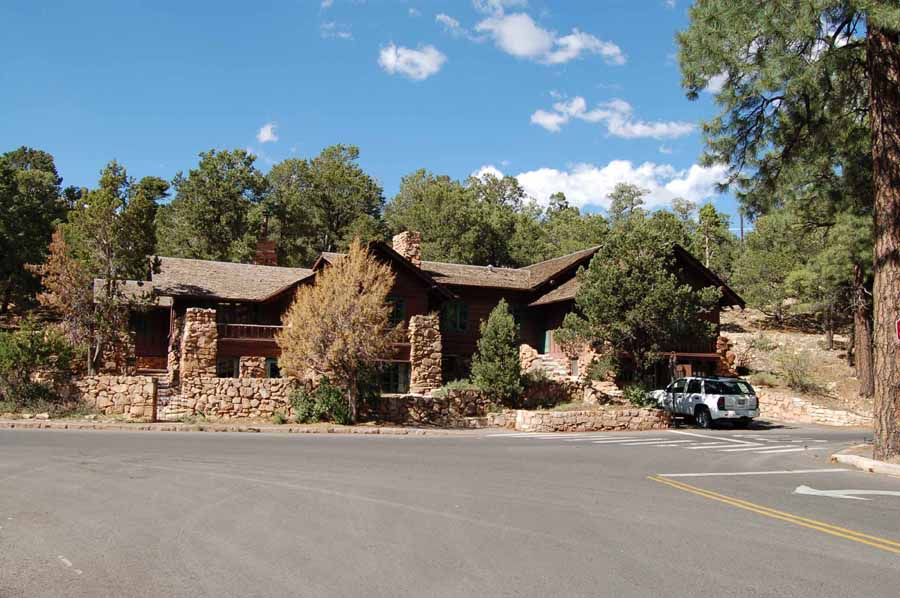

- Location within Arizona Location within the United States
- Location: Off Rte. 8A, in Grand Canyon National Park, Grand Canyon, Arizona
- Coordinates: 36°3′22″N 112°8′5″W
- Built: 1921
- Architect: Daniel Ray Hull, Thomas Chalmers Vint
- Architectural style: Rustic
- NRHP reference No.: 74000450
- Added to NRHP: September 6, 1974

The Grand Canyon National Park Superintendent's Residence is an early National Park Service Rustic style building, designed in 1921 by Daniel Ray Hull of the National Park Service Branch of Plans and Designs as the park's first headquarters building. The visitor information room was financed by a donation from the Brooklyn Daily Eagle newspaper. The building was altered in 1931 by Thomas Chalmers Vint to be the park superintendent's residence, superseded as headquarters by the Grand Canyon Park Operations Building It is included in the Grand Canyon Village National Historic Landmark District.

== Description ==
As originally built the structure was a relatively small two-story, L-shaped administrative building with a stone first floor and a frame second floor. When it was converted to a residence in 1931 it was enlarged in a sympathetic manner, retaining its original design vocabulary. The main living quarters are on the upper level, with eight rooms including the living room, dining room, kitchen, bedrooms and bathrooms, with stone fireplaces in the dining and living rooms. The main entrance is from a porch off the living room. The downstairs features a family room with another stone fireplace, formerly the visitor information office. There remainder of the lower level is occupied by a variety of rooms and winding corridors that connect to a two-car garage. The building is currently used for administrative offices for one of the park's concessionaires.

== Historic designation ==
The Superintendent's Residence was listed on the National Register of Historic Places on September 6, 1974. It is a major contributing component to the Grand Canyon Village Historic District, a National Historic Landmark District.

== See also ==
- Architects of the National Park Service
- National Register of Historic Places listings in Grand Canyon National Park
- Rustic architecture in Arizona
