= Grand Canyon Park Operations Building =

- U.S. National Register of Historic Places
- U.S. National Historic Landmark
- U.S. National Historic Landmark District – Contributing property
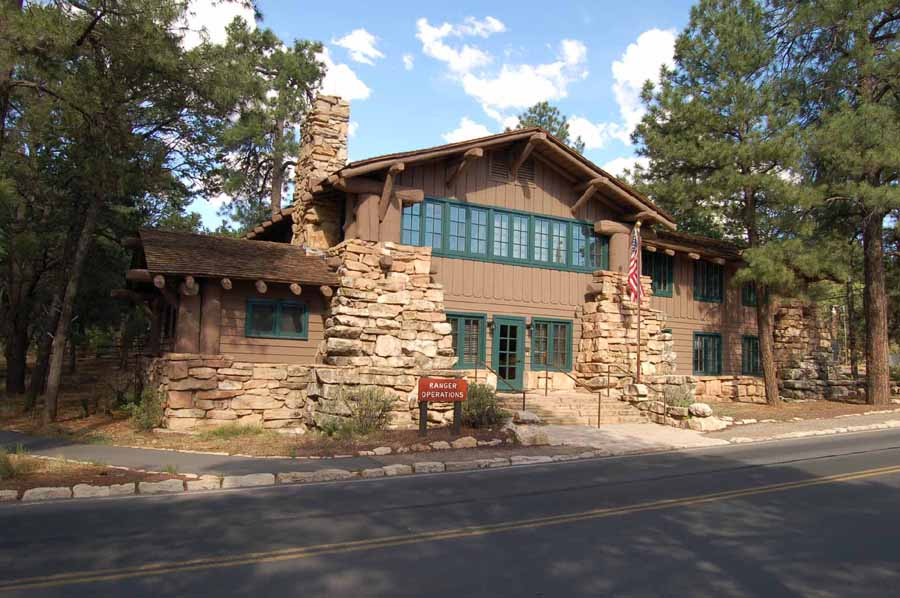

- Location within Arizona Location within the United States
- Location: Grand Canyon National Park, Arizona
- Coordinates: 36°3′18.1″N 112°8′12.9″W
- Built: 1929
- Architect: NPS Landscape Division
- Part of: Grand Canyon Village Historic District (ID75000343)
- NRHP reference No.: 87001412

Significant dates
- Added to NRHP: May 28, 1987
- Designated NHL: May 28, 1987
- Designated NHLDCP: February 18, 1987

The Grand Canyon Park Operations Building was built in 1929 on the South Rim of the Grand Canyon in Grand Canyon National Park. It is significant as an example of a National Park Service building designed to blend harmoniously with the natural surroundings, in the National Park Service Rustic style. The Operations Building was designed to replace the Superintendent's Residence as the park headquarters. It was in turn replaced by a newer building in 1967, and presently functions as the headquarters for park law enforcement. The building was designed by the National Park Service Landscape Division under the direction of Thomas Chalmers Vint, and has been designated a National Historic Landmark for its design significance.

== Description ==
The Park Operations Building is a two-story structure, with rubble Kaibab limestone construction to the sill level of the first floor and wood-frame construction above. The building is dominated by massive battered rubble piers extending to the second floor sill level, with three large peeled log corner posts at each corner. It is crowned by a shallow-pitched roof with deep, bracketed eaves. A 1938 restroom addition is constructed in a similar manner, with sympathetic use of form and materials. The gabled roof runs back from the principal elevation, which features a ribbon of windows at the second floor and a central entrance door flanked by windows at the first floor.

Little remains of the original interior, which was substantially renovated in 1938 and several times later. The lobby, however, remains substantially intact, with a large stone fireplace whose chimney supports log ceiling beams.

The Operations Building is one of the earliest and largest examples of Park Service rustic design at the Grand Canyon, part of the largest developed area in a U.S. national park. The Grand Canyon Village ensemble was developed with a consistent and original design theme in a style unique to the Park Service, in opposition to the eclectic style of park concessioners at the El Tovar Hotel.

== Historic designations ==
The Park Operations Building was declared a National Historic Landmark on May 28, 1987, reflecting its status as a prominent example of rustic construction in the national parks. It is included in the Grand Canyon Village National Historic Landmark District.

== See also ==
- Architects of the National Park Service
