= Timber Creek Road Camp Barn =

- Formerly listed on the U.S. National Register of Historic Places
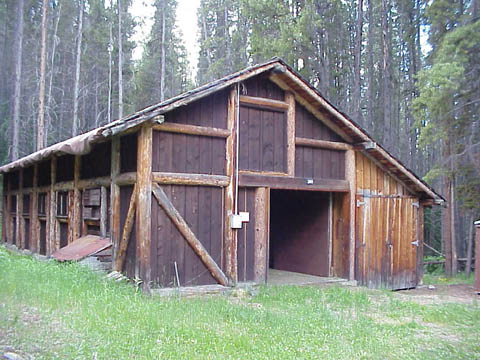
- Front of the barn

- Location within Colorado Location within the United States
- Nearest city: Estes Park, Colorado
- Coordinates: 40°22′45″N 105°50′53″W
- Built: 1931
- Architect: Thomas C. Vint, NPS Office of Design & Construction
- MPS: Rocky Mountain National Park MRA
- NRHP reference No.: 87001134

Significant dates
- Added to NRHP: July 30, 1987
- Removed from NRHP: January 28, 2022

The Timber Creek Road Camp Barn was built in 1931 to support the construction of Trail Ridge Road in Rocky Mountain National Park. The design is attributed to Thomas Chalmers Vint of the National Park Service Branch of Plans and Designs. The barn was moved in 2002 and used for storage. It was listed on the National Register of Historic Places in 1987, and was delisted in 2022.

== See also ==
- National Register of Historic Places listings in Grand County, Colorado
