= United States Forest Service Recreation Residence Program =

Residential program of the U.S. Forest Service

Recreation Residences or "Forest Service Cabins" are private residences enabled by the 1915 Occupancy Permits Act on land that later became the US Forest Service. The Recreation Residence Program authorizes the public to construct recreational cabins subject to various permit terms. As of 2014, there are over 14,000 Recreational Residences on Forest Service land and the owners of these residences are represented by the National Forest Homeowners group. Recreation cabins are sometimes misused and have been a source of controversy, but the program was renewed with the passage of 2014 Cabin Fee Act (CFA) as part of the 2015 National Defense Authorization Act.

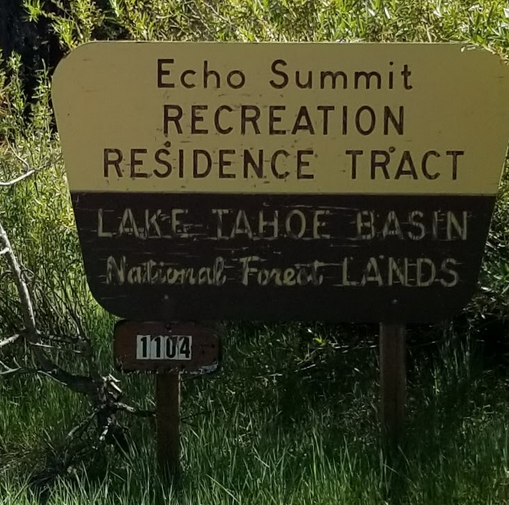
Recreational Residence tract near Lake Tahoe, California

== Description ==
The United States Forest Service Recreation Residence Program is a residential recreation program of the United States Forest Service.

The program was established in 1915 to provide summer homes and seasonal recreation cabins to permit holders. The cabins are privately owned and are situated in specially designated tracts; occupants must abide by the rules of a Special Use Authorization permit issued by the Forest Service. Permit holders pay an annual fee for use of the land, and are expected to protect the forest environment and maintain the residences.

In the 1950s, the Forest Service stopped giving out permits for building cabins. In 1960, the forest service stopped opening additional tracts of land for the program. Many of the cabins remain in families that pass them down from generation to generation. Some are sold to family friends.

Cabin Life newsletter describes the "ins and outs" of having such a cabin, using an example in the Eldorado National Forest in California that has been owned by the same family for three generations.

The legislation for the program was modified in 2010.

== Examples ==
An example includes the Greenwood Lodge is listed on the National Register of Historic Places

As of 2024, there are currently 272 such residential cabins in the Lassen National Forest.
