= Timber Hill =

Summit in the US state of Missouri

Coordinates: 37°59′41″N 94°19′04″W

Timber Hill is a summit in Vernon County in the U.S. state of Missouri. It has an elevation of 860 feet (260 m).

Timber Hill is an isolated knob that is located just southeast of the confluence of the Marmaton River with the Little Osage River. The community of Horton is about four miles to the west on US Route 71.

Variant names were "Brushy Mound", "Letiembre Hill", "Tiembre Hill", and "Timbered Hill". "Timber" is a corruption of Letiembre, the French surname of Henry M. Letiembre, a pioneer citizen.
