= Lulu City, Colorado =

- Lulu City Site
- U.S. National Register of Historic Places
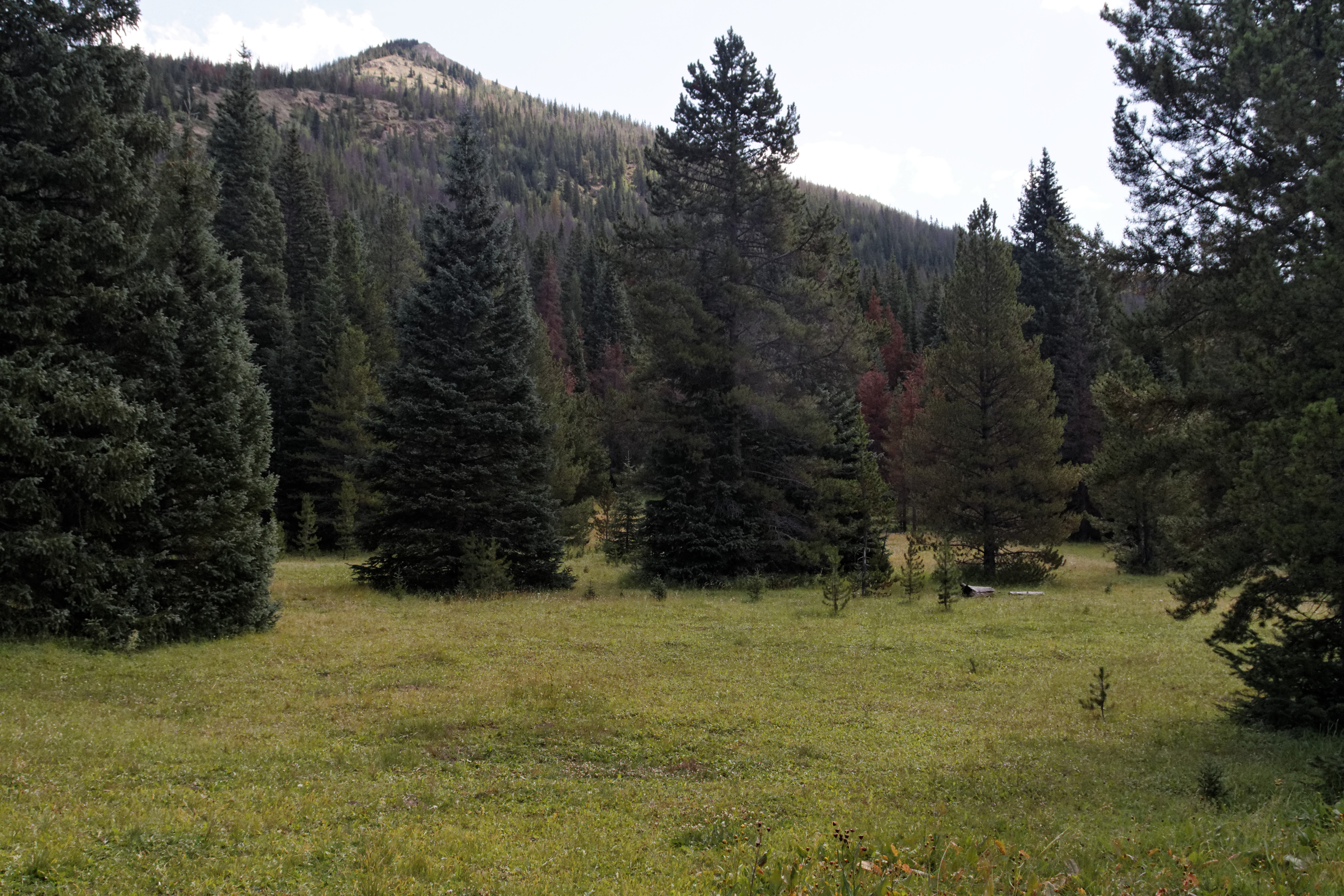

- Location within Colorado Location within the United States
- Nearest city: Grand Lake, Colorado
- Coordinates: 40°26′44″N 105°50′52″W
- Area: 160 acres (0.65 km^{2})
- Built: 1879
- MPS: Rocky Mountain National Park MRA (AD)
- NRHP reference No.: 77001562
- Added to NRHP: September 14, 1977

Lulu City was a transient mining town in eastern Grand County, Colorado, in the Kawuneeche Valley in what is now Rocky Mountain National Park. The town appeared after silver was discovered in the area in 1879 by prospector Joe Shipler, and was built primarily by the Middle Park and Grand River Land Improvement Company in 1880. The company was backed by Benjamin F. Burnett of Fort Collins and Fort Collins rancher William Baker. The town was named after Burnett's daughter. By 1881, there were forty cabins and a number of business establishments. By this time it was apparent that the silver ore was of low grade, and that high transportation costs made mining in the area marginal, and the town began its decline. It was abandoned by 1885, except by Shipler, who lived there for thirty years.

The settlement of Dutchtown was established in the Never Summer Mountains to the west of town by outcasts from Lulu City.

The land was purchased from the estate of Hugh J. Harrison by the National Park Service in 1949. Three cabin ruins remain, along with remnants of other structures. The site was placed on the National Register of Historic Places on September 14, 1977.

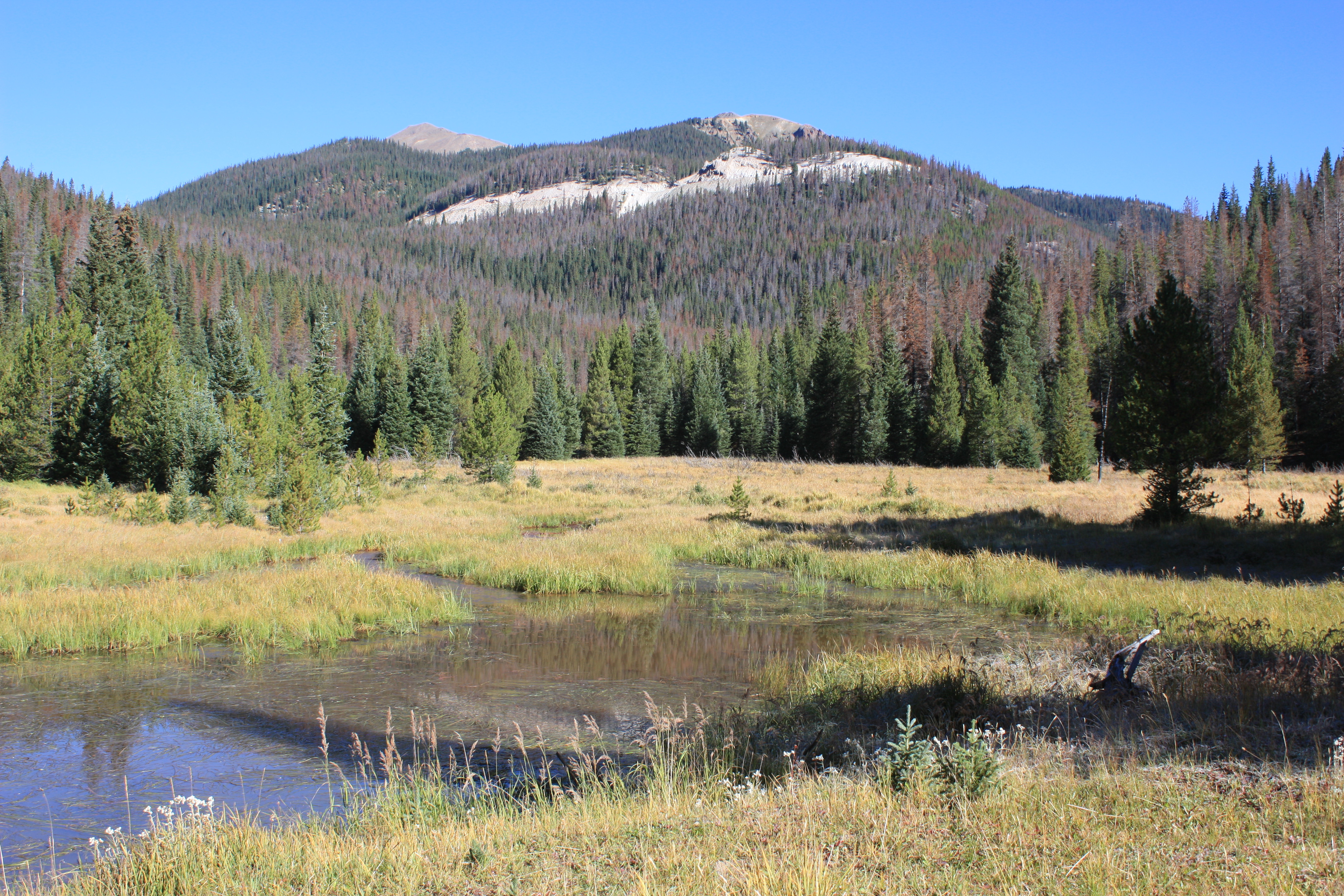
Lulu City town site. Lulu Mountain in background

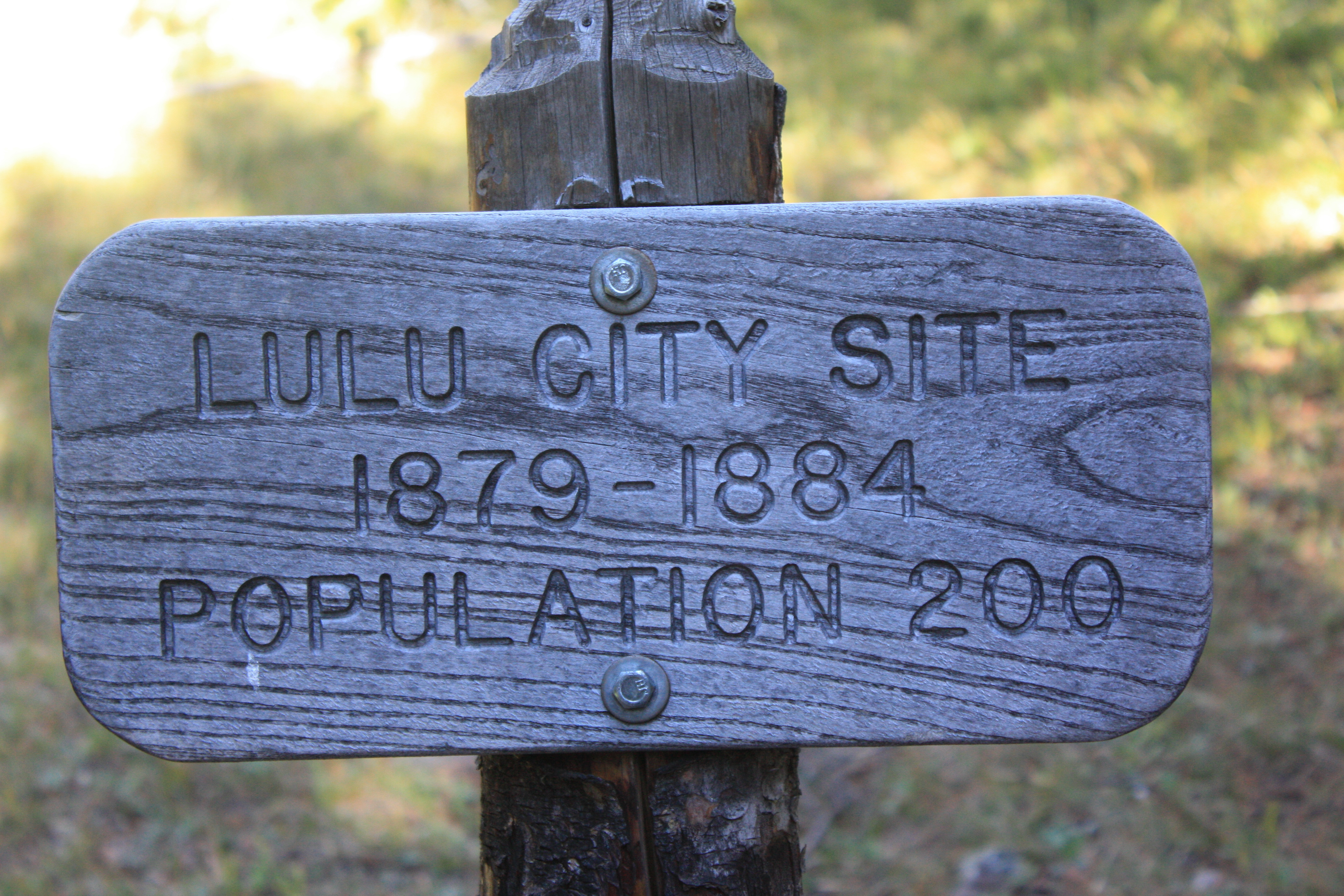
Lulu City marker, National Park Service

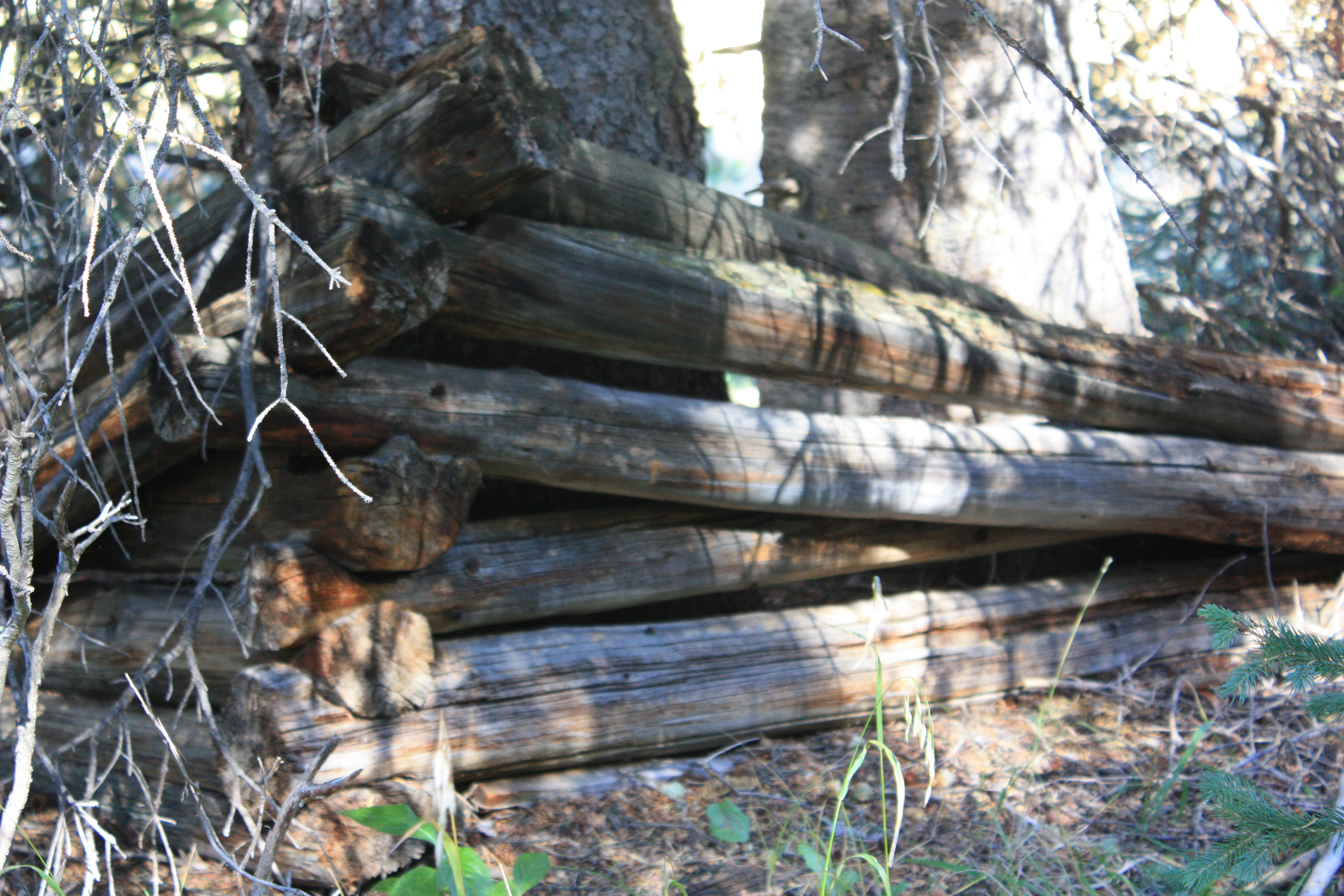
Remnant building site, Lulu City.

== See also ==
- National Register of Historic Places listings in Grand County, Colorado
