= Timber Creek Campground Comfort Stations =

- Timber Creek Campground Comfort Stations No. 245, 246 and 247
- U.S. National Register of Historic Places
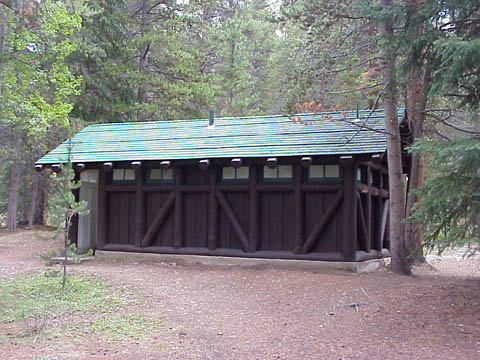
- Comfort Station 247

- Location within Colorado Location within the United States
- Nearest city: Estes Park, Colorado
- Coordinates: 40°22′50″N 105°51′5″W
- Built: 1939
- MPS: Rocky Mountain National Park MRA
- NRHP reference No.: 87001131, 87001132, 87001133
- Added to NRHP: January 29, 1988

The Timber Creek Campground Comfort Stations are a set of three historic public toilet facilities in Rocky Mountain National Park. Designed in 1935 by landscape architect Howard W. Baker of the National Park Service Branch of Plans and Designs, the National Park Service Rustic buildings were built with Civilian Conservation Corps labor in 1939. They were added to the National Register of Historic Places on January 29, 1988.

== See also ==
- National Register of Historic Places listings in Grand County, Colorado
