= Kawuneeche Valley =

Land feature in Colorado, United States

Coordinates: 40°21′23″N 105°51′32″W

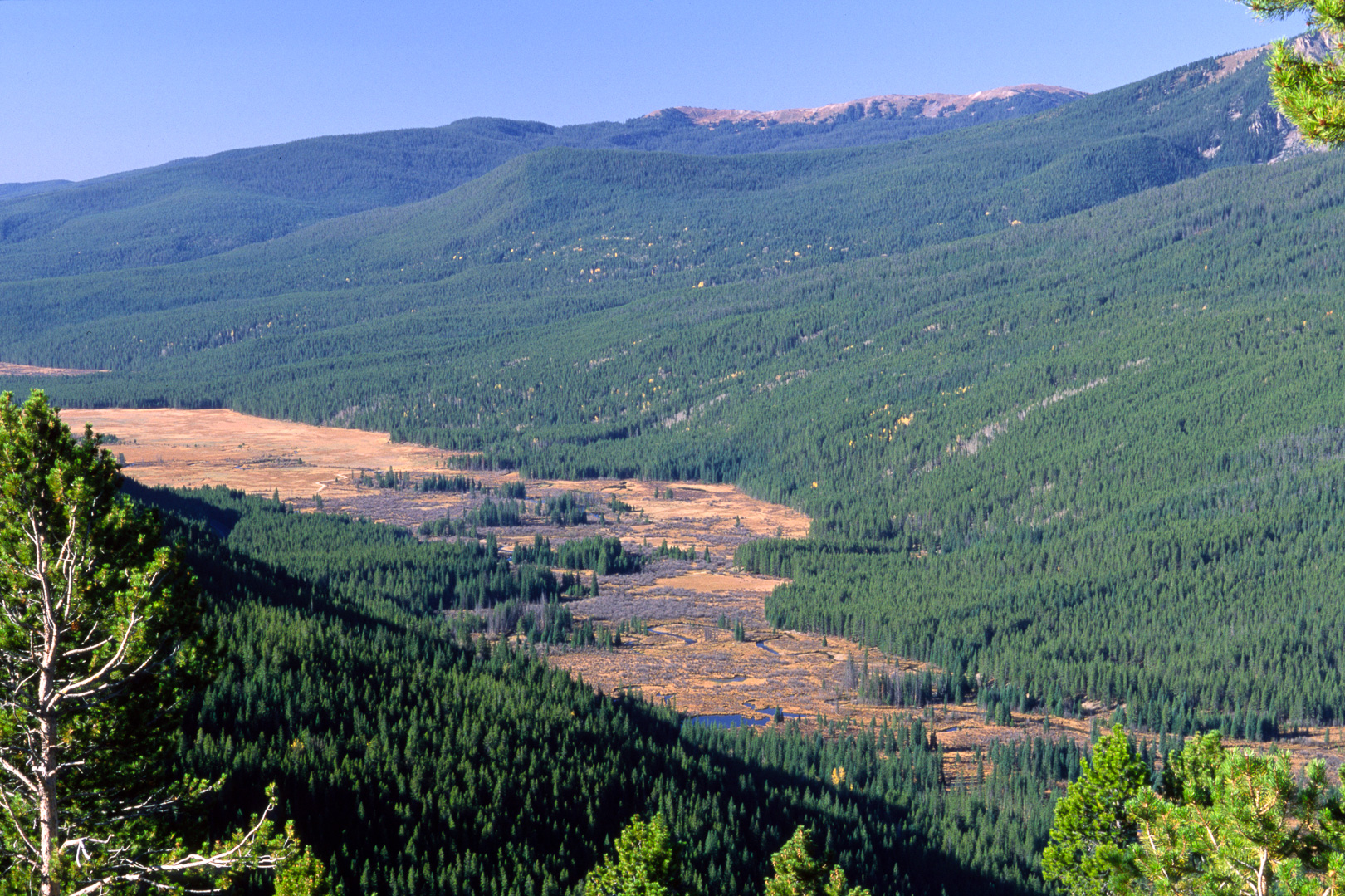
Kawuneeche Valley from Trail Ridge Road vicinity

Kawuneeche Valley, also known as Kawuneeche or Coyote Valley, is a marshy valley of the Colorado River near its beginning. It is located on the west side of Rocky Mountain National Park in Colorado. The axis of the valley runs almost directly north to south. Kawuneeche means "valley of the coyote" in Arapaho language and there is a Coyote Valley Trail head by US Route 34 in the western half of the park. Coyotes still live here, as do wapiti (elk), mule deer, moose (introduced in 1978 into nearby North Park), and mountain lion.

Along the main part of valley runs the lower section of the Trail Ridge Road - the highest continuous paved road in the United States.

== History ==
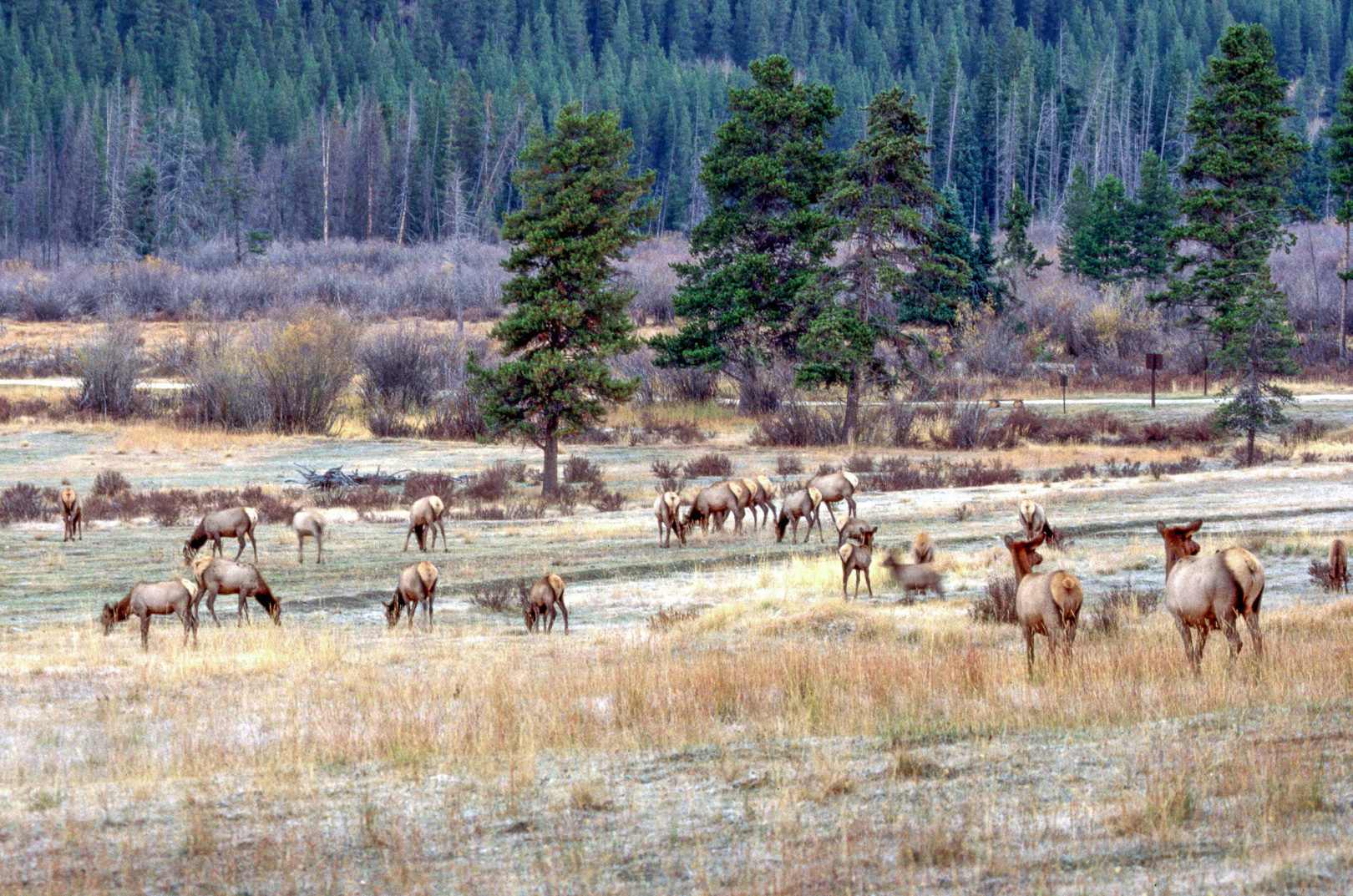
Rocky Mountain elk in Kawuneeche Valley at dawn

The construction of a water diversion canal called Grand Ditch between the 1890s and 1930s reduced the water table and limited the frequency and magnitude of the floods in the Kawuneeche Valley. Grand Ditch collects water from Colorado River's tributaries in the Never Summer Mountains like a rain gutter from the roof and diverts it on the other side of the Continental Divide to the Cache La Poudre River via La Poudre Pass, instead of allowing it to flow down to the valley. In addition, Grand Ditch breached its bank on May 30, 2003, and a resulting debris flow caused extensive injury to the upper Kawuneeche Valley. The Grand Ditch owner - the Water Supply and Storage Company (WSSC) was ordered to pay $9 million settlement to the Rocky Mountain National Park. It was the largest natural resource damages payment in the history of the Park System Resource Protection Act. Grand Ditch exerts also negative aesthetic impact on the Kawuneeche.

== Fauna and flora ==
Elk (wapiti, Cervus canadensis) were reintroduced to their former habitat in the Colorado River Valley in the mid-1910s.

Moose (Alces alces) was reintroduced by the Colorado Division of Wildlife in the 1970s in North Park, which is just to the northwest of Rocky Mountain National Park although significant breeding populations may never have inhabited Colorado. This solitary species wanders alone moving south from Wyoming or east from Utah. And such moose probably account for sightings and kills in Colorado between the 1860s and 1960s. This is an ecological innovation driven largely by state game officials to attract sportsmen and tourists. Moose are known to undergo dramatic population cycles, which, in combination with European settlement, could account for their scarcity in Colorado before 1978. Populations were known in southern Wyoming's Medicine Bow Mountains.

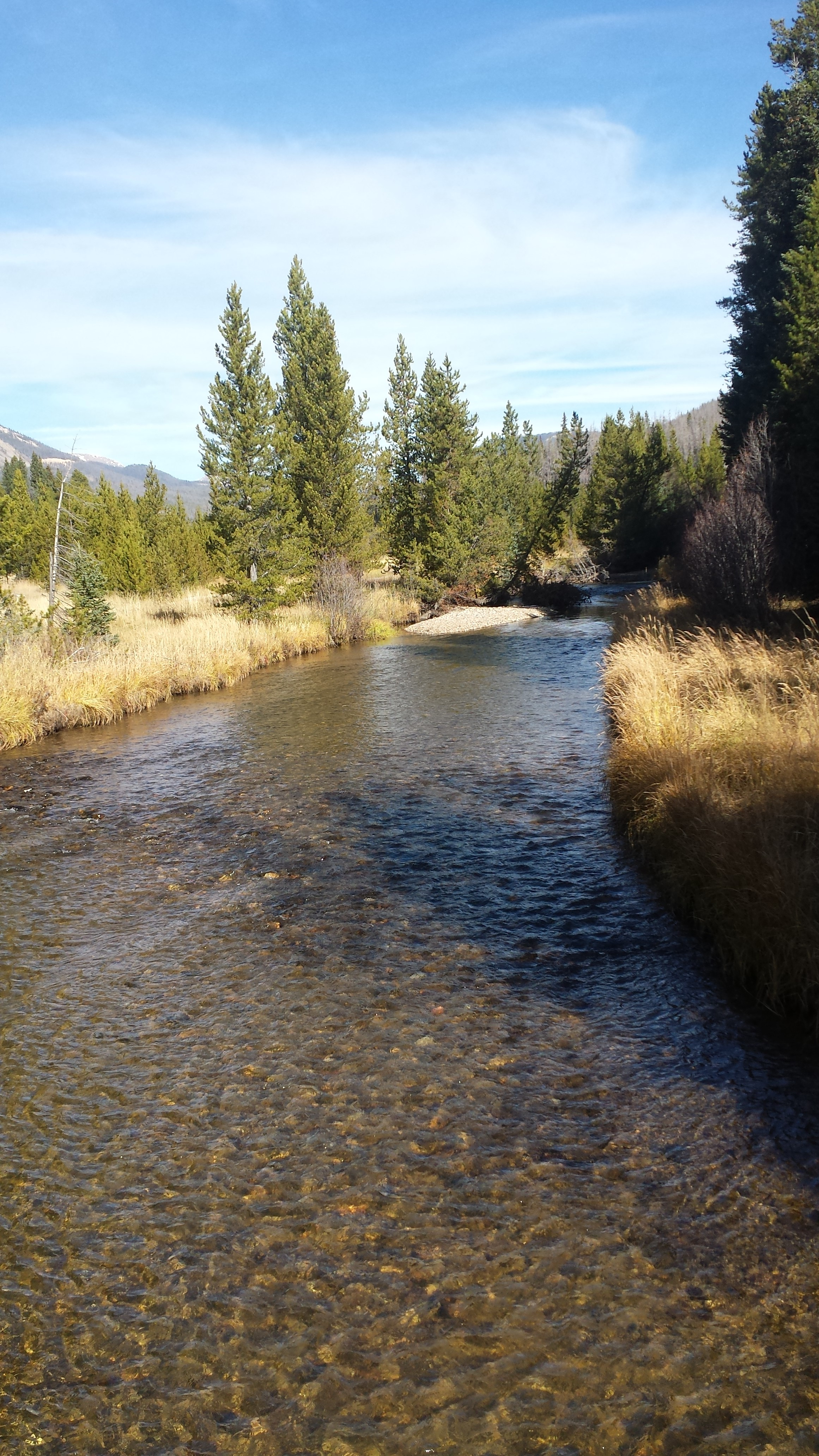
Colorado River at the Coyote Valley trailhead

In 1978 and 1979, 4 bulls, 13 cows, 4 yearlings, and 3 calves were transferred from the Uinta Mountains (Utah) and Grand Teton (Wyoming) to an area near Rand, west of the Never Summer Mountains (Kawuneeche Valley is located just on the east side of this range). All radio collared, 12 each year. Kawuneeche Valley has become prime moose habitat, although sightings frequently occur even further, east of the Continental Divide, and even south to the upper Rio Grande valley.

Large herbivores have become so numerous in the Kawuneeche Valley, that they cause significant harm to the willow (Salix spp.) thickets and other plants, on which many other organisms depend. Elk is overpopulated, but rarer moose more specialized - 91.3% of its summer diets consist of six willow species.

This is accompanied by drought (caused by water diversion by Grand Ditch, lack of beavers, global climatic patterns) and the proliferation of a native fungus spread by a bird called the sapsucker (Sphyrapicus spp.). The primary fungus species is Grosmannia clavigera, but Ophiostoma is also present. The fungi kill the stems above the wells drilled by sapsuckers.

All these factors weaken the ability of the valley's willows to generate new growth, their communities have declined, only few willow plants on the primary winter range produce seed. As a result, fully dependent on twigs and bark on willow stems North American beaver (Castor canadensis), actually living in symbiosis with willow, substantially recovered from fur-trapping by the mid-twentieth century, declined the Kawuneeche.

The most important bark beetle species in the Kawuneeche Valley are mountain pine beetle (Dendroctonus ponderosae) and spruce beetle (Dendroctonus rufipennis). In recent years, these species have devastated forests on the western side of Rocky Mountain National Park.

Thanks to the ecologists and fisheries scientists the native Colorado River cutthroat trout (Oncorhynchus clarki pleuriticus) is coming back, but introduced brook trout (Salvelinus fontinalis), rainbow trout (Oncorhynchus mykiss) and Yellowstone cutthroat trout (Oncorhynchus clarki bouvieri) continue to compete with the Kawuneeche's native fish. The Grand Ditch enabled fish to swim between the two basins and to mix previously isolated gene pools of two native trout subspecies — greenback cutthroat trout (Oncorhynchus clarki stomias) from the eastern slope of the Rockies, and Colorado River cutthroat trout (Oncorhynchus clarkii pleuriticus) from the west.

== Historical places ==
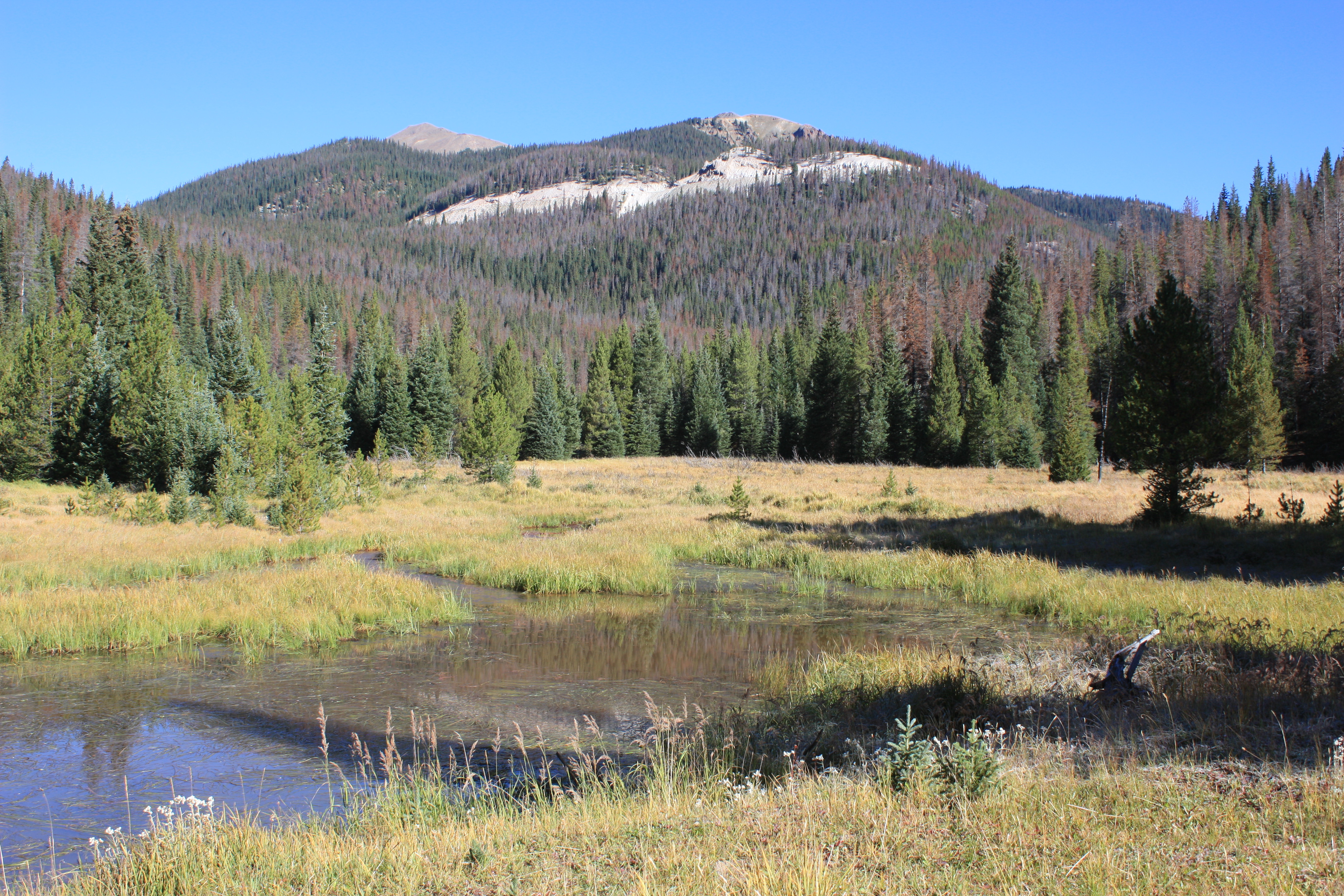
Lulu City town site

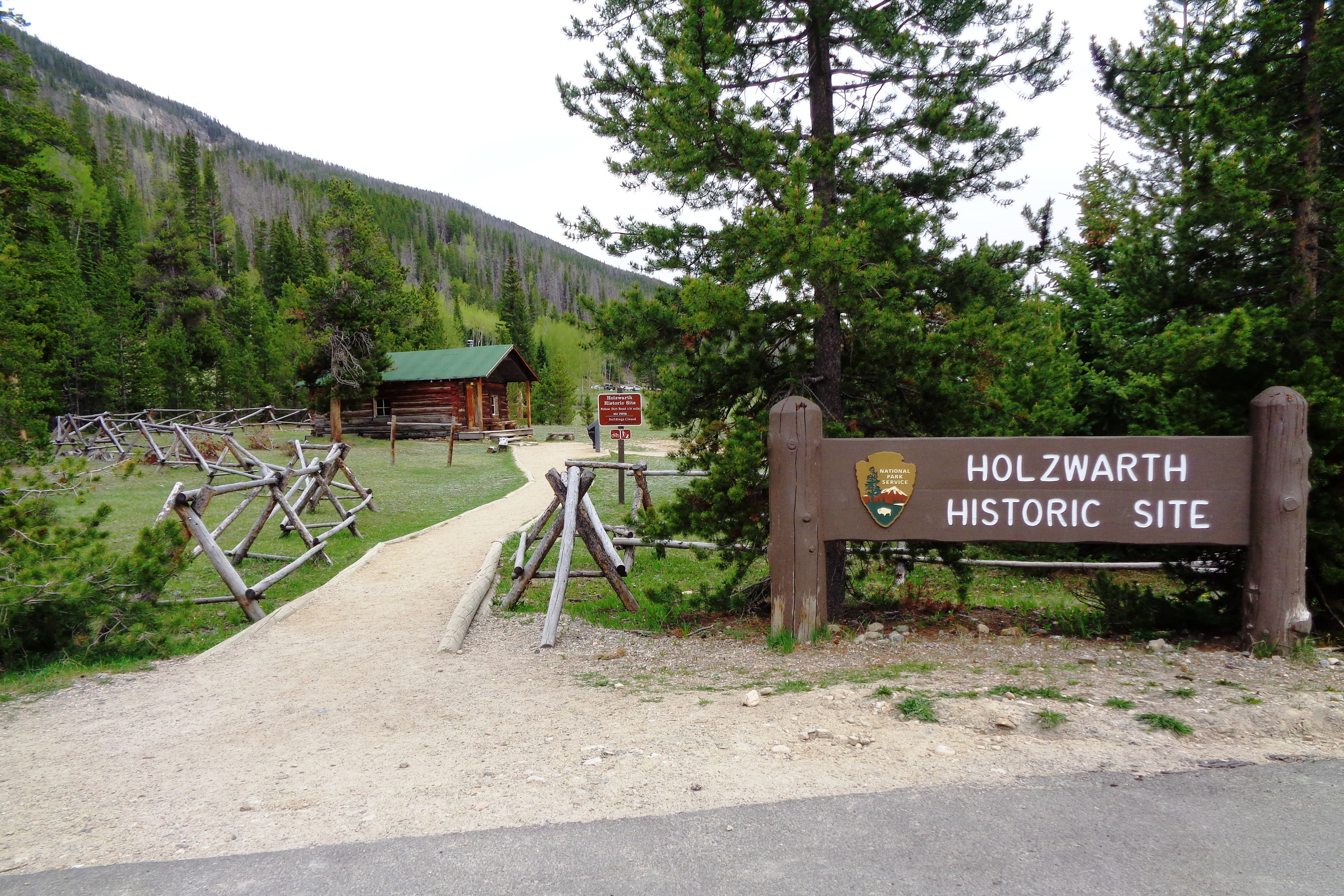
Holzwarth Historic Site

There are a few historical places located in the valley or its vicinity, like:

- Trail Ridge Road (U.S. National Register of Historic Places reference #84000242, added to NRHP November 14, 1984)
- Grand Ditch, mentioned earlier water diversion canal in the Never Summer Mountains (NRHP reference #84000242, added September 29, 1976)
- Lulu City (NRHP reference #77001562, added September 14, 1977) and Gaskil - sites of the mining camps from the 1880s. They were abandoned after a few years of the short-lived mining boom.
- Dude ranches
  - The site of Phantom Valley Ranch, renamed from the "Squeaky Bob" Wheeler's famous Hotel de Hardscrabble by subsequent owner, established in the 1910s at the northern tip of the valley below Milner Pass.
  - The old Holzwarth family's place, comprising a series of cabins, interpreted by the park as the "Never Summer Ranch" (NRHP reference #77000112, added December 2, 1977). Its use began in 1919.

== Climate ==
Harbison Meadow is a Remote Automated Weather Station in the Kawuneeche Valley, located slightly north of the Kawuneeche Valley visitor center. Harbison Meadow has a subalpine climate (Köppen Dfc), with long, cold winters and short, mild summers.

Climate data for Harbison Meadow (RAWS), Colorado, 2003–2020 normals: 8600ft (2621m)
Month	Jan	Feb	Mar	Apr	May	Jun	Jul	Aug	Sep	Oct	Nov	Dec	Year
Mean daily maximum °F (°C)	30.7 (−0.7)	33.9 (1.1)	42.8 (6.0)	48.8 (9.3)	57.7 (14.3)	70.4 (21.3)	75.8 (24.3)	73.1 (22.8)	66.8 (19.3)	52.8 (11.6)	40.8 (4.9)	30.4 (−0.9)	52.0 (11.1)
Daily mean °F (°C)	14.5 (−9.7)	18.3 (−7.6)	25.9 (−3.4)	33.7 (0.9)	42.4 (5.8)	51.3 (10.7)	56.6 (13.7)	54.0 (12.2)	47.2 (8.4)	36.6 (2.6)	25.2 (−3.8)	15.2 (−9.3)	35.1 (1.7)
Mean daily minimum °F (°C)	−1.9 (−18.8)	2.7 (−16.3)	9.0 (−12.8)	18.8 (−7.3)	27.0 (−2.8)	32.3 (0.2)	37.3 (2.9)	34.9 (1.6)	27.6 (−2.4)	20.4 (−6.4)	9.5 (−12.5)	−0.1 (−17.8)	18.1 (−7.7)
Source: XMACIS2
