= Occupancy Permits Act =

- Other short titles: Term Permit Act of 1915; Term Occupancy Permits Act
- Long title: An Act Making appropriations for the Department of Agriculture for the fiscal year ending June thirtieth, nineteen hundred and sixteen
- Enacted by: the 63rd United States Congress
- Effective: March 4, 1915

Citations
- Public law: Public Law 63-293
- Statutes at Large: 38 Stat. 1086

Codification
- U.S.C. sections created: 16 U.S.C. § 497

Legislative history
- Introduced in the House of Representatives as H.R. 20415 by Asbury Francis Lever (D‑SC) on January 11, 1915; Committee consideration by House Committee on Agriculture; Passed the House of Representatives on February 1, 1915 (Voice vote); Passed the Senate on February 25, 1915 (43–15); Reported by the joint conference committee on February 26 – March 3, 1915; agreed to by the House of Representatives on March 3, 1915 (220–103) and by the Senate on March 3, 1915 (Voice vote); Signed into law by President Woodrow Wilson on March 4, 1915

Major amendments
- Act of July 28, 1956 (70 Stat. 708)

The Occupancy Permits Act was passed on March 4, 1915, by the 63rd United States Congress. It allowed the U.S. Forest Service to issue to cabin permits at "reasonable rates" to individuals who had had their property taken through eminent domain. Permits could be issued for periods of up to 30 years. Individuals were encouraged to build homes within the boundaries of national parks in order to widen the Forest Services' work in recreational management. It is the basis of the USFS Recreation Residences program.

== Purpose ==
Rental rates were already low, but this measure was meant to give the federal government further insurance protection with the "Forest Register" which oversaw rates to allow lower rents by lengthening the amount of time contracted to residents.

It affected private cabins on lands that had, at some point, been designated public. It established reasonable rental rates, with "reasonable" meaning rates that were not too low, allowing those who had lived on the land for years who had had their property taken through eminent domain to continue to reside there for their remaining years.
