= Fall River Road =

Historic road at Rocky Mountain National Park

- Old Fall River Road
- U.S. National Register of Historic Places
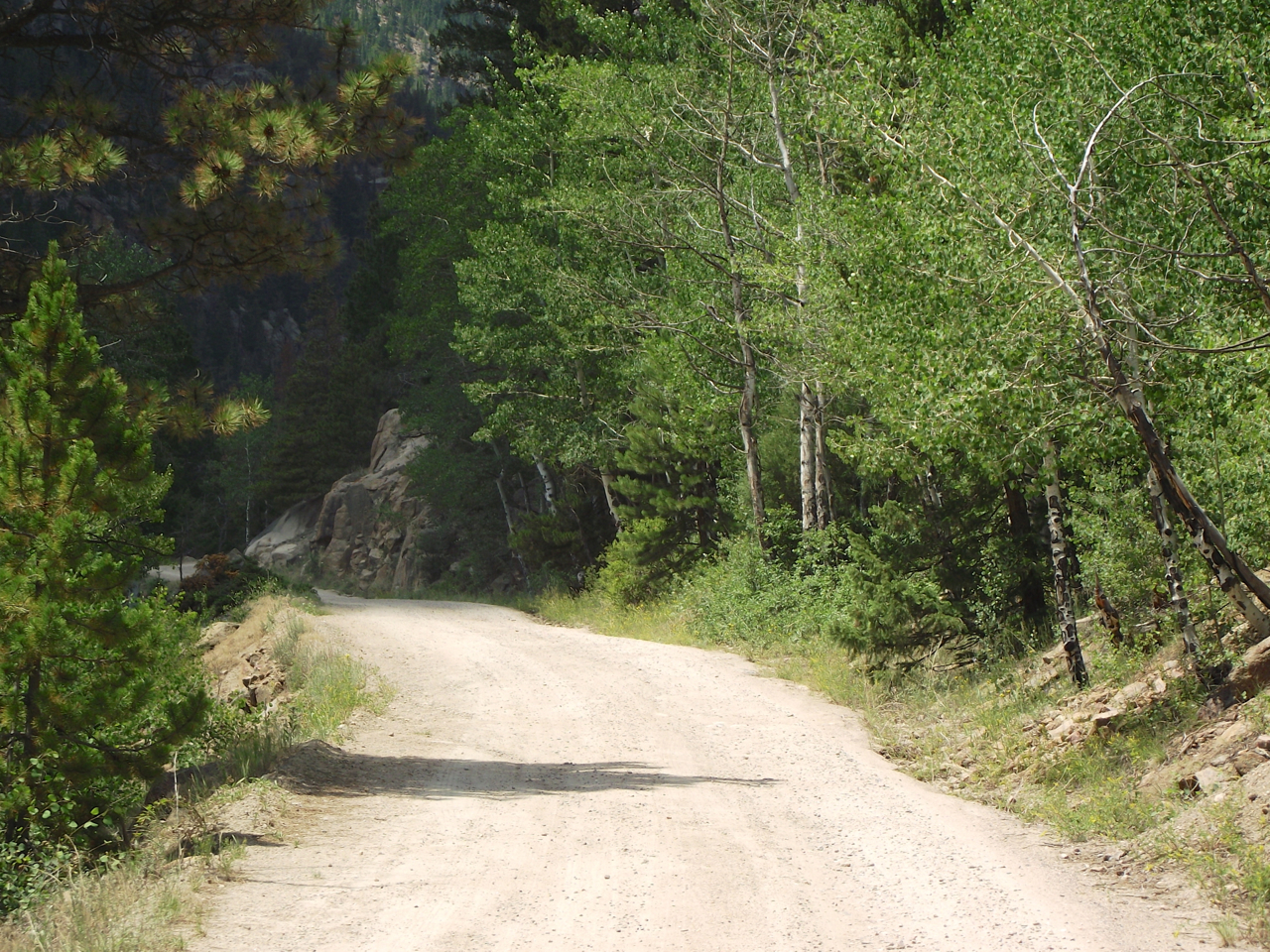
- Fall River Road

- Location within Colorado Location within the United States
- Nearest city: Estes Park, Colorado
- Coordinates: 40°25′47″N 105°42′43″W
- Built: 1913–1920
- MPS: Rocky Mountain National Park MRA
- NRHP reference No.: 87001129 (original); 100002416 (increase)

Significant dates
- Added to NRHP: July 20, 1987
- Boundary increase: May 21, 2018

The Old Fall River Road, sometimes referred to as "The Old Road" by park staff in Rocky Mountain National Park, was the first automobile road to penetrate the interior of the park. The road linked the east side of the park near Estes Park with Grand Lake on the west side.

== Route ==
Old Fall River Road is a one-way road that begins in the Eastern part of the park, past the Fall River Visitor Center and Sheep Lakes Viewing Area. The road with winds up the side of Mount Chapin with many sharp switchbacks before ending at the Alpine Visitor Center parking lot. Along the way, there are two trailheads at Chasm Falls and at Chapin Creek.

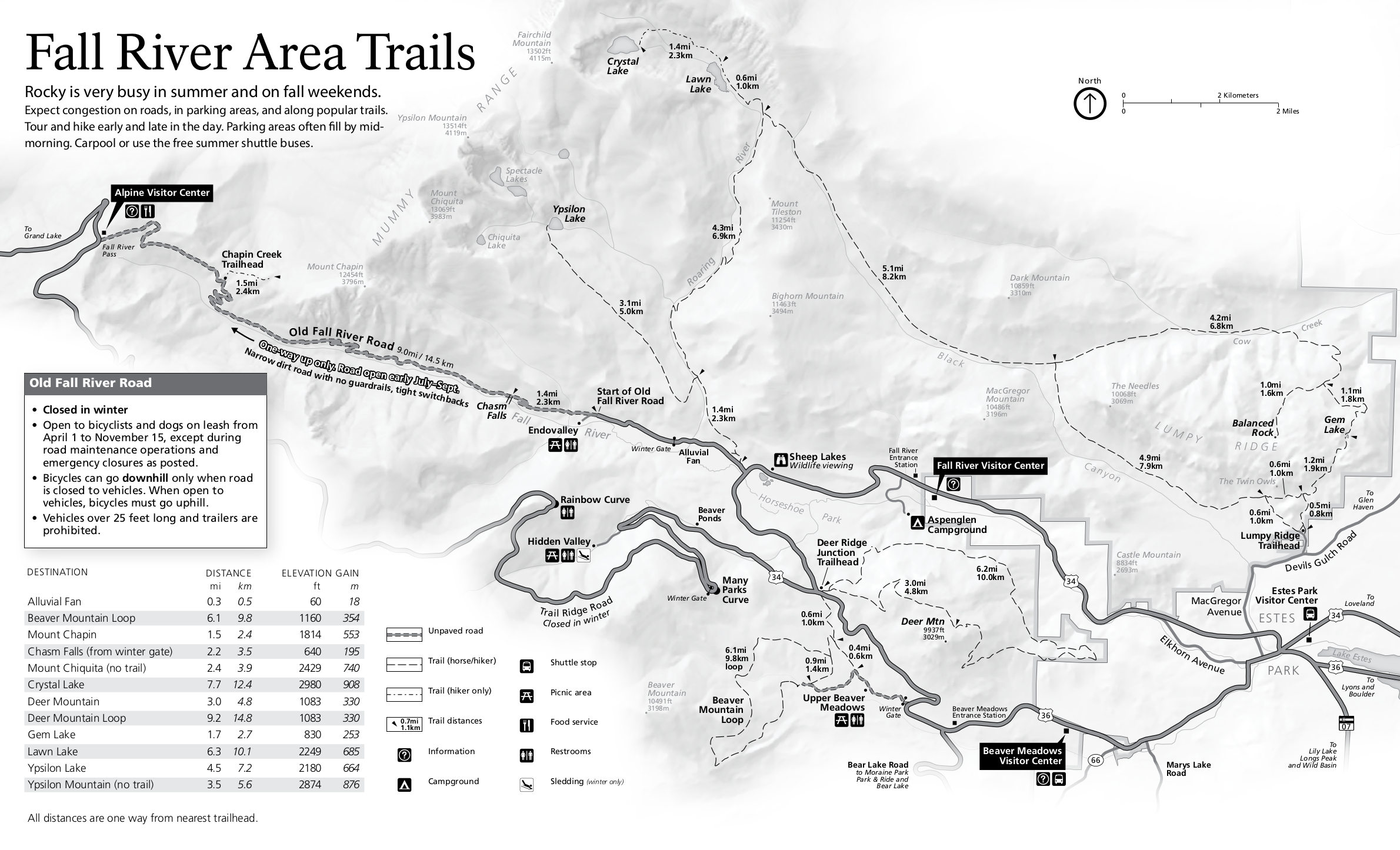
A map of the Fall River Area Trails, including Old Fall River Road.

== History ==
Work began in 1913 but was interrupted in 1914 by World War I with final work being completed between 1918 and 1920.

The narrow road was partly replaced by Trail Ridge Road in 1932, which incorporated sections of the Fall River Road. The road runs westward from Sheep Lakes to the Alpine Visitor Center. A rockslide closed the road in 1953 and it was not re-opened until 1968 when the National Park Service cleared the rocks and paved the lower third of the route.

== Operating season ==
The one-way Old Fall River Road is maintained and open to motor vehicles from early July through early October, depending on the weather. Old Fall River Road may be closed for a time to all uses for maintenance.

== See also ==
- National Register of Historic Places listings in Larimer County, Colorado
