= Timber Creek (South Dakota) =

Stream in South Dakota, U.S.

Coordinates: 44°30′13″N 102°02′17″W

Timber Creek is a stream in the U.S. state of South Dakota.

Timber Creek's name comes from the Sioux Indians of the area, for the variety of trees growing along the creek.

== See also ==
- List of rivers of South Dakota
