= Trail Ridge Road =

Colorado Scenic and Historic Byway

Coordinates: 40.4177°N 105.7467°W

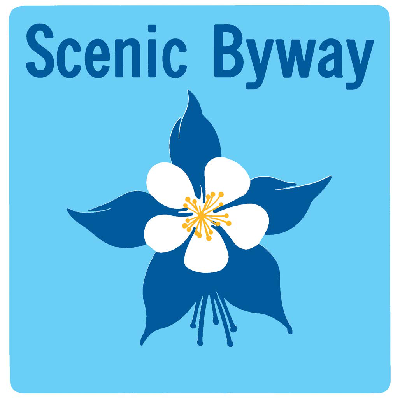
Trail Ridge Road A part of the Trail Ridge Road/Beaver Meadow National Scenic Byway

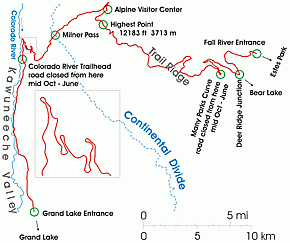
- Schematic map of the Trail Ridge Road

Route information
- Maintained by National Park Service
- Length: 48 mi (77 km)
- Existed: 1989–present

Major junctions
- East end: US 34 Estes Park
- West end: US 34 Grand Lake

Location
- Country: United States
- State: Colorado
- Counties: Larimer and Grand counties

Highway system
- Scenic Byways; National; National Forest; BLM; NPS; Colorado State Highway System; Interstate; US; State; Scenic
- Trail Ridge Road
- U.S. National Register of Historic Places
- NRHP reference No.: 84000242
- Added to NRHP: November 14, 1984

Trail Ridge Road is the name for the 48-mile (77 km) stretch of U.S. Highway 34 that traverses Rocky Mountain National Park from Estes Park, Colorado in the east to Grand Lake, Colorado in the west. Together with the connecting 6.9-mile (11 km) Beaver Meadow Road (U.S. Highway 36), Trail Ridge Road forms the 55-mile (89 km) Trail Ridge Road/Beaver Meadow National Scenic Byway, an All-American Road. With a high point at 12,183 feet (3,713 m) elevation, Trail Ridge Road is the highest continuous paved road in North America. The higher portion of Trail Ridge Road is closed from October to May.

== Route description ==
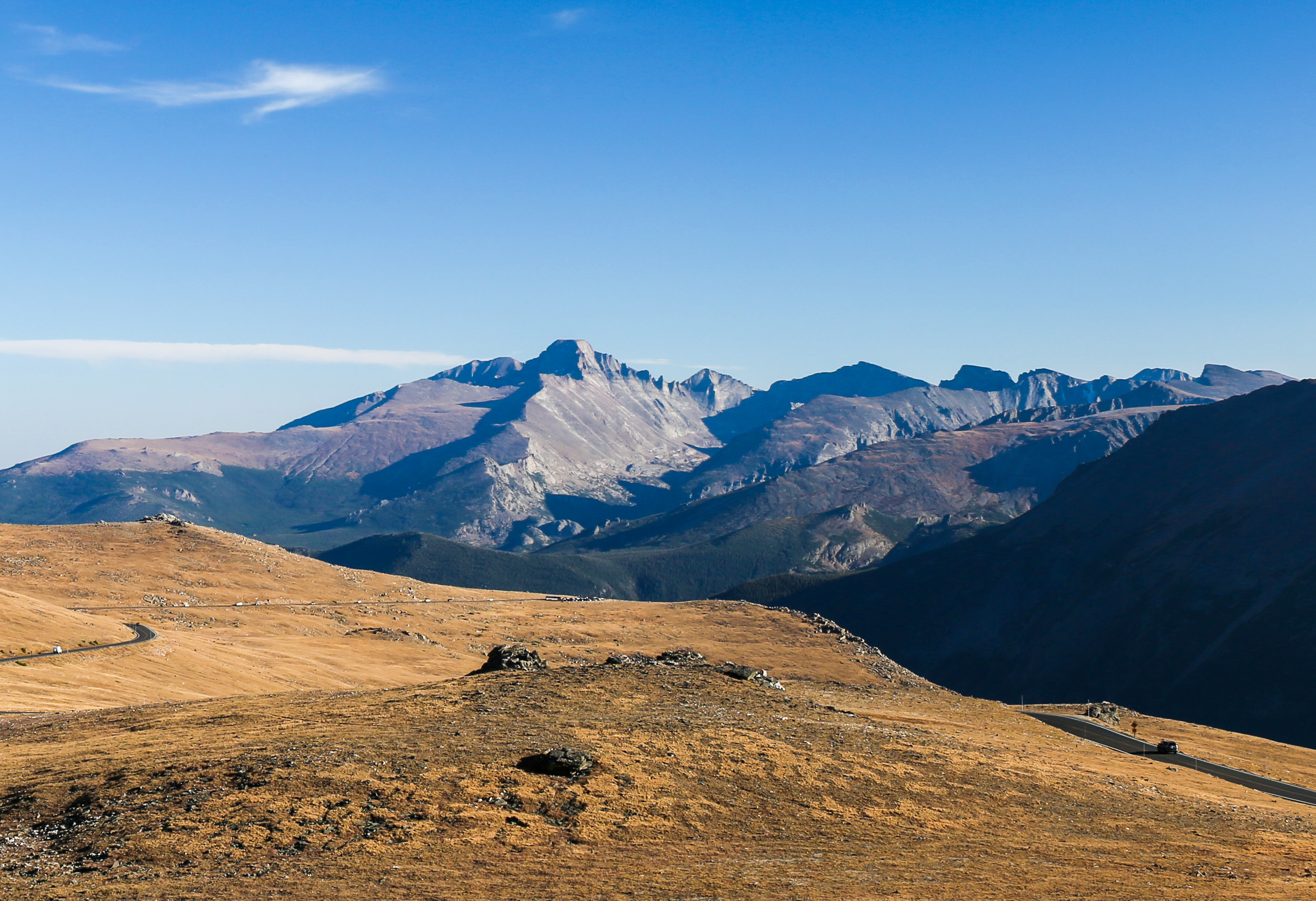
Trail Ridge Road, with Longs Peak (left of center), Pagoda Mountain (center, in sun), Chiefs Head Peak (right of center, in shadow), and Terra Tomah Mountain (at far right edge, in shadow), from 12,000 feet (3,700 m) above sea level in Rocky Mountain National Park

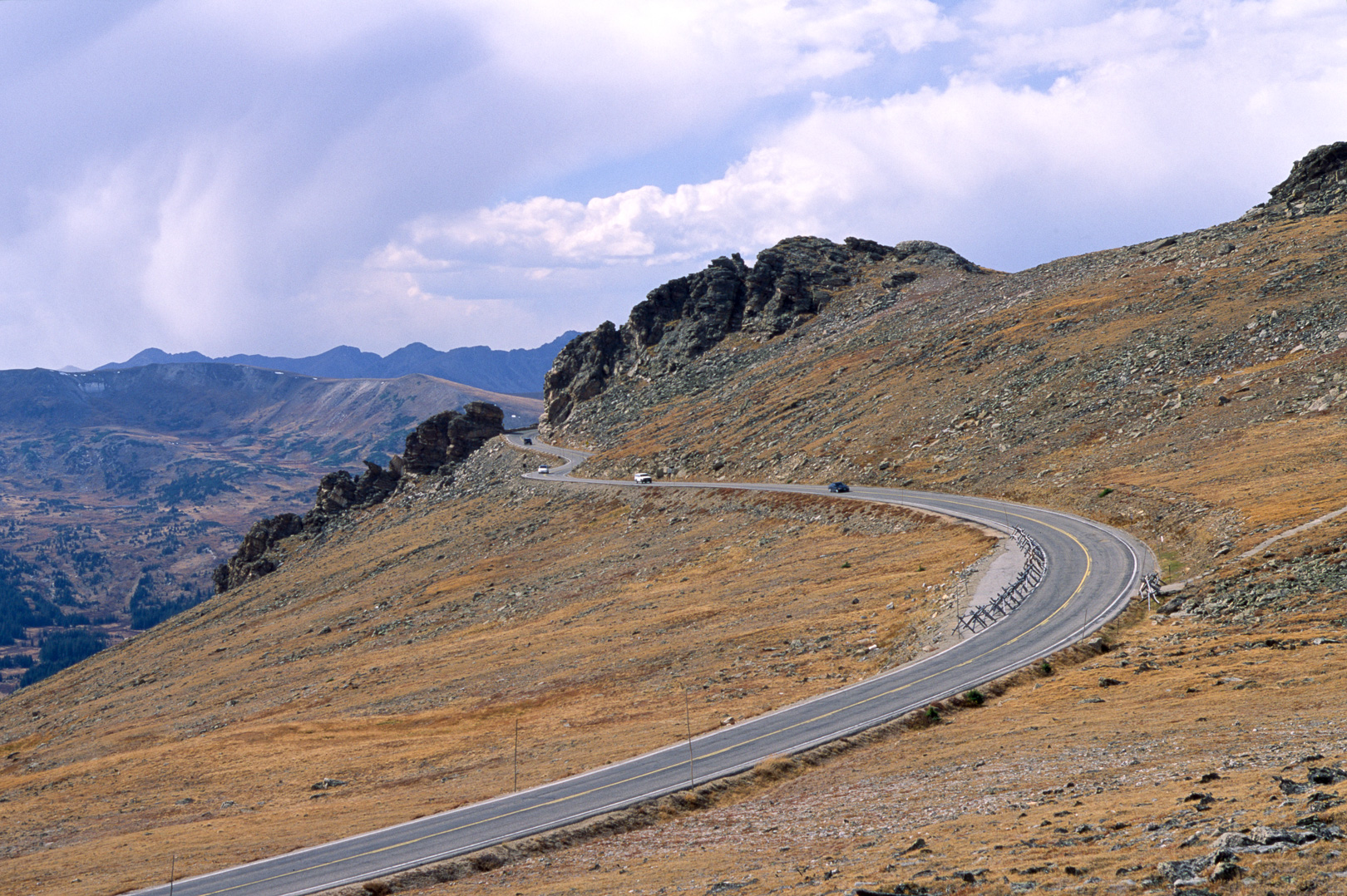
View of Trail Ridge Road

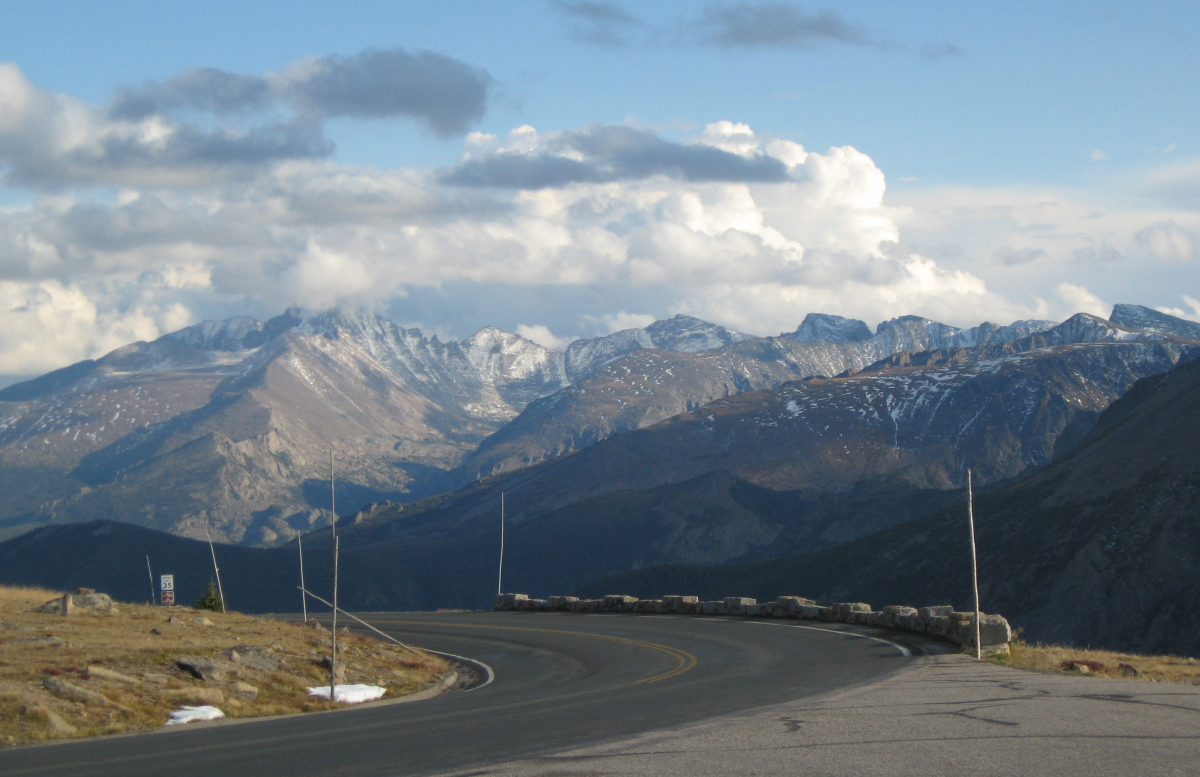
The wooden poles mark the edge of the road for the spring snowplowing. The height of the poles illustrate how deep the snowpack gets; the road is closed through the winter.

From Kawuneeche Visitor Center at the park's Grand Lake Entrance, Trail Ridge Road follows the North Fork of the Colorado River north through the Kawuneeche Valley. There are several trailheads along this section of the road, notably the Colorado River Trailhead, which is the western terminus of the road segment closed during the winter.

The road crosses the Continental Divide at Milner Pass (elev. 10,758 ft or 3,279 m) and reaches a maximum elevation of 12,183 ft (3,713 m), near Fall River Pass (elev. 11,796 ft or 3,595 m). Near the highest point on the road is another pass, Iceberg Pass (elev. 11,827 ft or 3,605 m).

According to construction contracts and park maintenance files, the east end of the road is located at the Fall River entrance, however some guides list Deer Ridge Junction as the east end.

Trail Ridge is a high, flat spur range extending east from the main range of the Rockies between Fall River in the North and the Big Thompson River in the South. The road follows Trail Ridge from the Fall River Pass near Alpine Visitor Center to the Deer Ridge Junction.

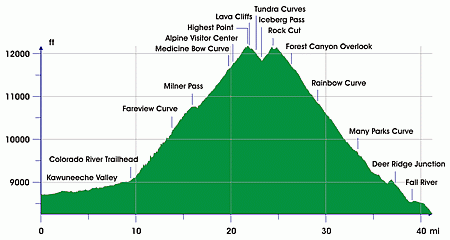
Trail Ridge Road - elevation profile, based on elevation values obtained from Google Maps Elevation Service (m/km here).

== Climate ==
Climate data for Trail Ridge High Point 40.4093 N, 105.7142 W, Elevation: 12,149 ft (3,703 m) (1991–2020 normals)
Month	Jan	Feb	Mar	Apr	May	Jun	Jul	Aug	Sep	Oct	Nov	Dec	Year
Mean daily maximum °F (°C)	19.9 (−6.7)	20.3 (−6.5)	27.3 (−2.6)	34.7 (1.5)	43.4 (6.3)	54.8 (12.7)	61.5 (16.4)	59.0 (15.0)	52.2 (11.2)	40.7 (4.8)	27.0 (−2.8)	20.1 (−6.6)	38.4 (3.6)
Daily mean °F (°C)	12.1 (−11.1)	11.9 (−11.2)	18.0 (−7.8)	24.1 (−4.4)	33.0 (0.6)	43.8 (6.6)	50.7 (10.4)	48.7 (9.3)	41.8 (5.4)	30.9 (−0.6)	19.4 (−7.0)	12.3 (−10.9)	28.9 (−1.7)
Mean daily minimum °F (°C)	4.3 (−15.4)	3.6 (−15.8)	8.7 (−12.9)	13.6 (−10.2)	22.6 (−5.2)	32.8 (0.4)	40.0 (4.4)	38.3 (3.5)	31.5 (−0.3)	21.1 (−6.1)	11.8 (−11.2)	4.5 (−15.3)	19.4 (−7.0)
Average precipitation inches (mm)	3.79 (96)	3.85 (98)	3.73 (95)	4.88 (124)	4.07 (103)	1.77 (45)	2.37 (60)	2.23 (57)	2.16 (55)	2.82 (72)	3.34 (85)	3.51 (89)	38.52 (979)
Source: PRISM Climate Group

== History ==
Trail Ridge had been used by Native Americans to cross the mountains between their home lands in the west and hunting areas on the east side. Arapahoe Indians called the trail located on the ridge as "taienbaa" ("Where the Children Walked") because it was so steep that children could not be carried, but had to walk. The Ute tribe crossing the mountains at Forest Canyon Pass marked their route with stone cairns. The present park Ute Trail follows partially that ancient route.

On the west side, about 1880, a wagon road was constructed along the Kawuneeche Valley from the town of Grand Lake to the mining camps of Lulu City and Gaskill. The camps were abandoned after a few years when short-lived mining boom ended and later the road was used only occasionally by hunters and tourists.

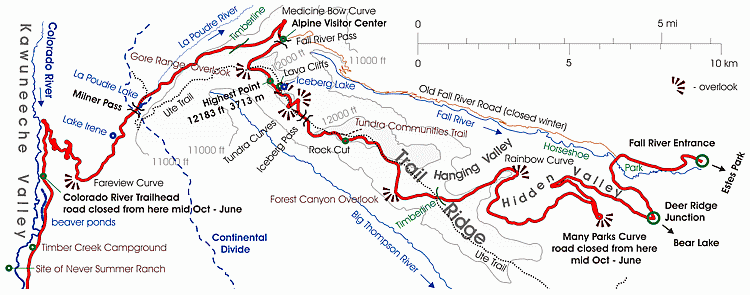
Schematic map of the Trail Ridge Road northern sections.

Fall River Road was the first road into the park's high country. It opened in 1921 and quickly proved inadequate for motor travel as a single-track road with steep grades (up to 16%), tight curves and a short annual season due to snowpack. Construction began in 1929 and was complete to Fall River Pass by July 1932, with a maximum grade of 7%. The road was complete through the Kawuneeche Valley to Grand Lake in 1938. The route followed what was known to local Arapaho Indians as the Dog Trail. Internal opposition to the construction of a road through the park's alpine tundra was overruled by National Park Service director Horace Albright, who wished to encourage park visitation. The road was designed to intrude as little as possible into the landscape, in accordance with Park Service design principles.

Hidden Valley (or Ski Estes Park) was a local ski area attraction from 1955 – 1991, off of Trail Ridge Road, now defunct.

== See also ==
- National Register of Historic Places listings in Larimer County, Colorado
