= Milner Pass =

Mountain pass in Colorado, USA

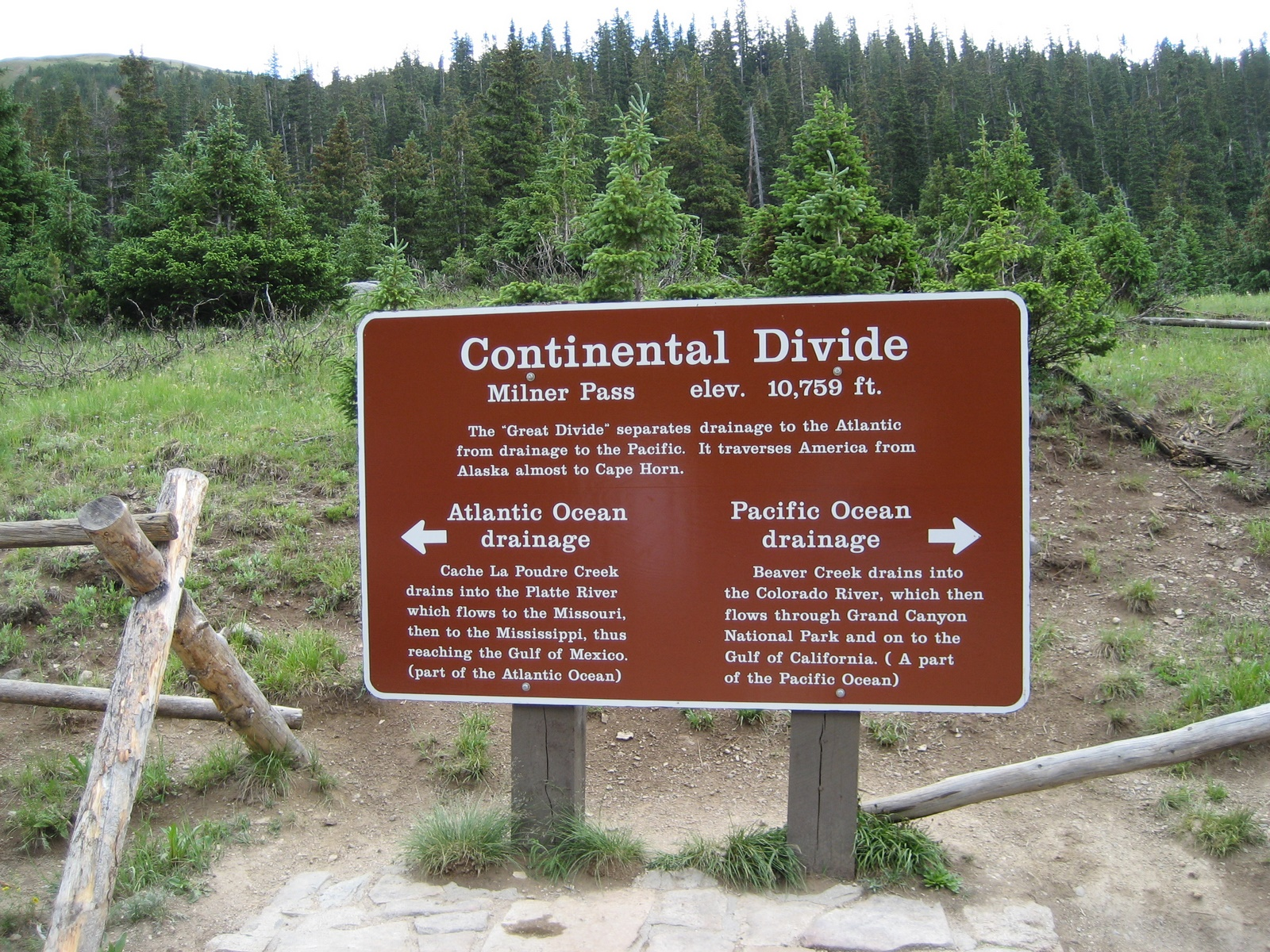
- Interactive map of Milner Pass
- Elevation: 10,759 ft (3,279 m)
- Traversed by: US 34

Location
- Location: Grand / Larimer counties, Colorado, U.S.
- Range: Front Range
- Coordinates: 40°25′11″N 105°48′41″W
- Topo map: USGS Fall River Pass

Milner Pass, elevation 10,759 ft (3,279 m) is a mountain pass in the Rocky Mountains of northern Colorado in the United States. It is located on the continental divide in the Front Range, within Rocky Mountain National Park, along the boundary between Larimer and Grand counties. The pass provides the passage over the continental divide for US 34, also known as Trail Ridge Road between Estes Park and Grand Lake. The pass is not, however, the high point on Trail Ridge Road, which crests at 12,183 ft (3,713 m) east of the pass within Rocky Mountain National Park. Along with the rest of Trail Ridge Road, the pass is generally closed in winter from the first heavy snow fall (usually October) until the opening of the road around Memorial Day. The gentle pass divides the headwaters of the Cache la Poudre River (which issues from Poudre Lake just east of the pass) and several creeks near the headwaters of the Colorado River to the west. The road near the pass provides a panoramic view of the Never Summer Mountains to the west.

The pass is named in honor of T.J. Milner, an engineer who surveyed a potential railroad route over the pass. The railroad was never built.

== Climate ==
There is a weather station near the summit of Milner Pass at Lake Irene (Colorado). Lake Irene has a subalpine climate (Köppen Dfc), bordering on an alpine climate (ETH), with only two months averaging over 50 °F (10 °C).

Climate data for Lake Irene, Colorado, 1991–2020 normals, 1985-2020 extremes: 10,700 ft (3,300 m)
Month	Jan	Feb	Mar	Apr	May	Jun	Jul	Aug	Sep	Oct	Nov	Dec	Year
Record high °F (°C)	59 (15)	51 (11)	63 (17)	63 (17)	78 (26)	83 (28)	80 (27)	76 (24)	74 (23)	66 (19)	60 (16)	48 (9)	83 (28)
Mean maximum °F (°C)	42 (6)	44 (7)	51 (11)	57 (14)	63 (17)	71 (22)	74 (23)	72 (22)	68 (20)	59 (15)	49 (9)	41 (5)	76 (24)
Mean daily maximum °F (°C)	25.4 (−3.7)	28.3 (−2.1)	36.1 (2.3)	41.7 (5.4)	50.6 (10.3)	60.1 (15.6)	65.9 (18.8)	63.6 (17.6)	56.7 (13.7)	44.9 (7.2)	33.0 (0.6)	24.9 (−3.9)	44.3 (6.8)
Daily mean °F (°C)	15.9 (−8.9)	17.6 (−8.0)	24.4 (−4.2)	30.0 (−1.1)	38.7 (3.7)	47.4 (8.6)	53.2 (11.8)	51.5 (10.8)	45.2 (7.3)	34.5 (1.4)	23.3 (−4.8)	15.7 (−9.1)	33.1 (0.6)
Mean daily minimum °F (°C)	6.3 (−14.3)	6.9 (−13.9)	12.5 (−10.8)	18.2 (−7.7)	26.8 (−2.9)	34.7 (1.5)	40.5 (4.7)	39.4 (4.1)	33.5 (0.8)	23.9 (−4.5)	13.6 (−10.2)	6.5 (−14.2)	21.9 (−5.6)
Mean minimum °F (°C)	−12 (−24)	−10 (−23)	−5 (−21)	2 (−17)	13 (−11)	26 (−3)	34 (1)	33 (1)	21 (−6)	6 (−14)	−5 (−21)	−12 (−24)	−17 (−27)
Record low °F (°C)	−22 (−30)	−26 (−32)	−18 (−28)	−15 (−26)	1 (−17)	18 (−8)	26 (−3)	25 (−4)	6 (−14)	−11 (−24)	−18 (−28)	−30 (−34)	−30 (−34)
Average precipitation inches (mm)	3.66 (93)	3.67 (93)	3.62 (92)	4.51 (115)	3.41 (87)	1.56 (40)	2.03 (52)	2.01 (51)	1.90 (48)	2.79 (71)	3.32 (84)	3.30 (84)	35.78 (910)
Average extreme snow depth inches (cm)	58 (150)	72 (180)	81 (210)	80 (200)	66 (170)	26 (66)	1 (2.5)	0 (0)	2 (5.1)	12 (30)	26 (66)	45 (110)	86 (220)
Source 1: XMACIS2
Source 2: NOAA (Precipitation)
