= Alexander Mountain =

Mountain in Colorado, United States

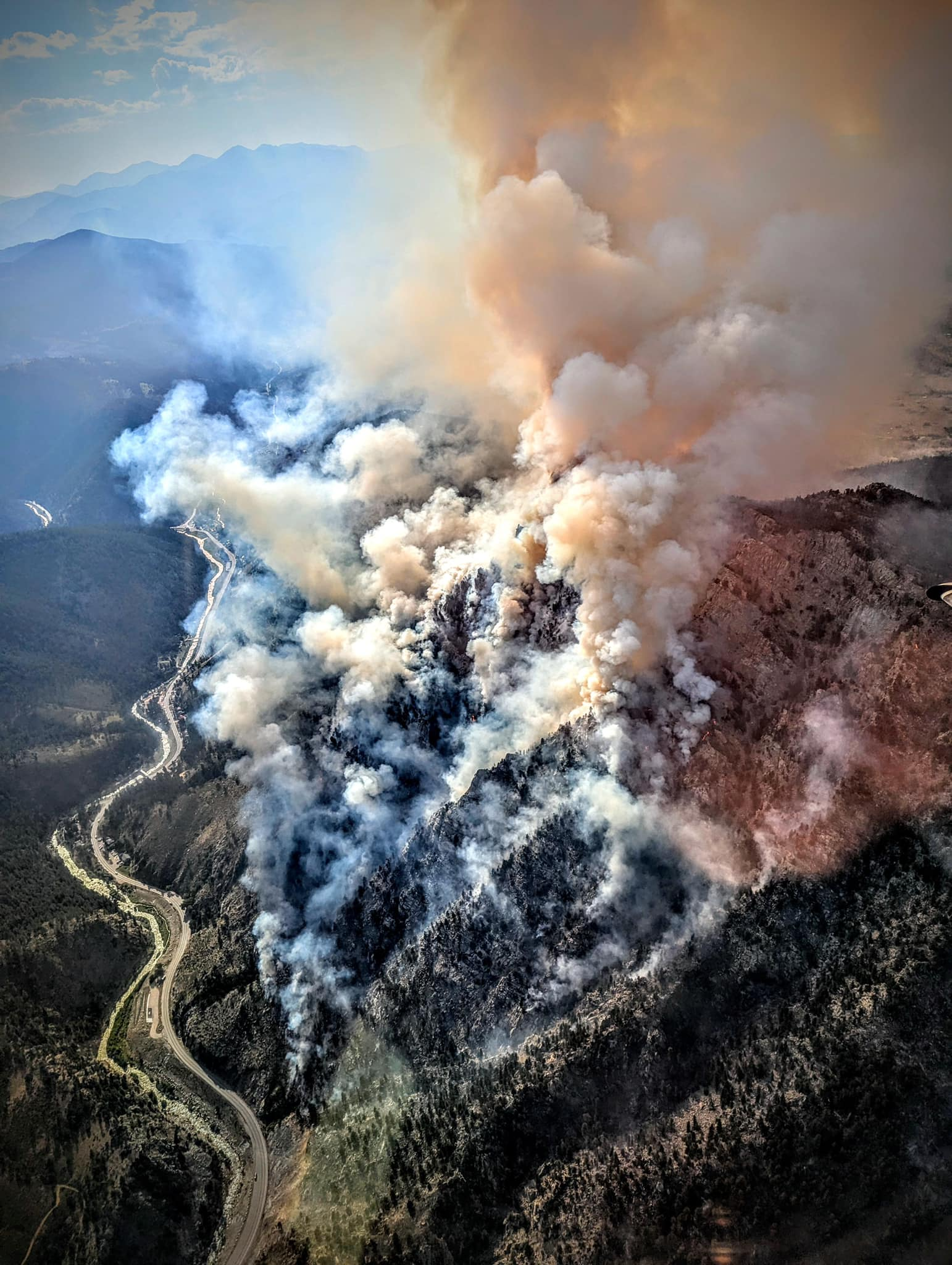

Highest point
- Elevation: 7,074 ft (2,156 m); NAVD88
- Isolation: 2.15 mi to Stone Mountain
- Coordinates: 40°25′39″N 105°15′05″W

Geography
- Location: Larimer County, Colorado
- Parent range: Front Range

Alexander Mountain is a mountain in Larimer County, Colorado named for the pioneers John and Grant Alexander. It is within a mid-elevation ponderosa pine forest in the Canyon Lakes Ranger District of the Roosevelt National Forest with mountain mahogany, skunkbrush, and gambel oak forbs. North of US Highway 34 between Loveland and Estes Park, west of Green Ridge, and east of Cedar Creek, it is recognizable by its pyramidal shaped south face. Its habitat is mesic and dry-mesic and has cliff faces which are home to rattlesnakes. Now home to the Sylvan Dale Guest Ranch, its cultural significance is the final stand in a bear hunt in the memoirs of Gerry Spence. On July 29, 2024, an unknown ignition of a hot dry remote area on the north face of the Alexander Mountain caused the Alexander Mountain Fire, receiving national attention for a rapidly accelerating wildfire causing a wide evacuation area under volatile circumstances and risking losses to communication and energy infrastructure as well as ranching and tourism communities along the Big Thompson River near Drake, Colorado.

== 2024 Alexander Mountain Fire ==
Alexander Mountain Fire
- Part of the 2024 Colorado wildfires
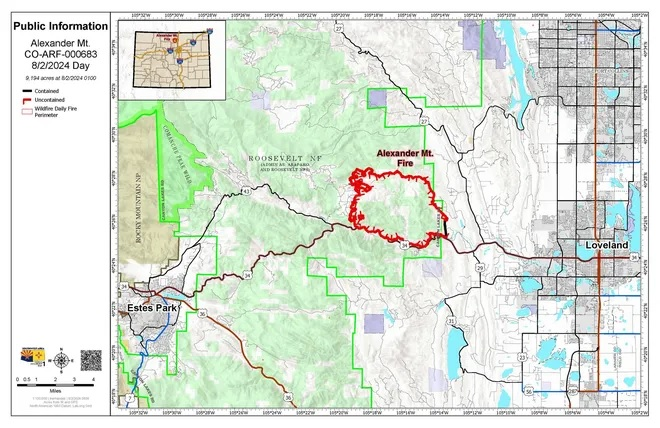
- Date: July 29, 2024; 10:39 am – August 11, 2024 (Mountain)
- Location: Roosevelt National Forest, Larimer County, Colorado
- Coordinates: 40°25′58″N 105°15′13″W

Statistics
- Status: Extinguished
- Burned area: 9,968 acres (4,034 ha)

Impacts
- Deaths: 0
- Injuries: 0
- Missing people: 0
- Evacuated: >5,000
- Livestock lost: minimal
- Structures lost: 25 homes, 20 outbuildings destroyed 4 homes damaged
- Cost: 6.1 million USD

Ignition
- Cause: human-caused

During the 2024 Colorado wildfire season, on Monday, July 29, near the Sylvan Dale Guest Ranch, the Alexander Mountain Fire ignited before 11:00 am. By 12:20 pm, the burn area was 100 acres and spreading quickly, growing to 245 acres by 12:45 pm. Near the mouth of the Big Thompson Canyon, 37 square miles of Larimer County were evacuated, from County Road 18E from Pole Hill to Pinewood Reservoir and Drake to The Dam Store along U.S. Highway 34, including Storm Mountain and Palisade Mountain. 90 horses were evacuated from the Sylvan Dale Guest Ranch to The Ranch in Loveland, which was preparing for the Larimer County Fair. They joined other animal evacuees. Employees of the Colorado Cherry Company were also evacuated. By 2:50 pm, the blaze was over 300 acres.

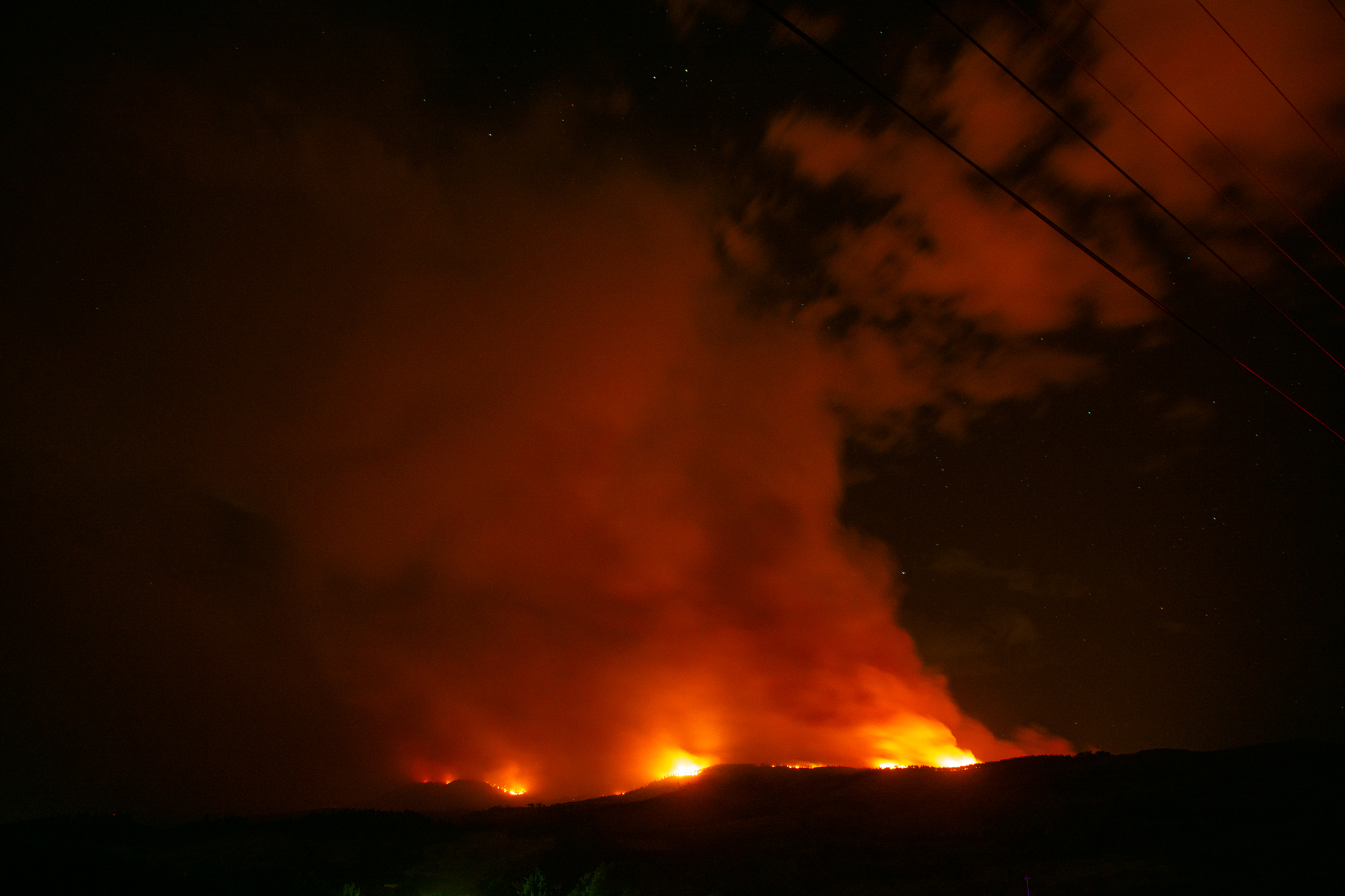
Alexander Mountain Fire seen from Masonville on the evening of July 30

=== Response ===
Loveland Fire Authority responded to the initial call at 10:39 am. The fire spread rapidly and the Larimer County Sheriff's Office assumed command of the incidence response under Emergency Services Coordinator Justin Whitesell. Air response arrived at 2:07 pm from Northern Colorado Regional Airport including four helicopters, one large air tanker, one multimission aircraft and Air Attack aerial supervision. Throughout the afternoon, they were joined by dozens of fire crews and at least 11 total aircraft. Growing by 500 acres in just 2 hours, by the end of Monday, the fire had burned 992 acres.

The fire slowly crept downhill overnight and into the next day with no major runs. At 6:00 am on Tuesday, July 30, a US Forest Service Type 3 Incident Management Team took command of firefighting. Horsetooth, Pinewood, Flatiron and Carter Lake reservoirs had all been closed to aid firefighting efforts. According to incident commander Mike Smith on Tuesday, hot, dry conditions expanded the burn area threatened to cross Cedar Creek westward. At this time, having burned a third of the Big Thompson Canyon, the fire was expected to run out of fuel on that front. Throughout Tuesday, over 270 firefighters focused on critical infrastructure and private property. Hot arid temperatures and dry fuel created difficult conditions. Evacuations expanded throughout the day. By 7:00 pm Tuesday, the burn area was 5080 acres.

==== Emergency declaration ====
By Wednesday morning, firefighting in the Colorado Front Range was complicated by two new fires, the Quarry Fire near Ken Caryl, and the Stone Canyon Fire near Lyons, Colorado in Boulder County. Smoke had settled in the vicinity. The fire remained active overnight in areas with dry flora. Infrastructure including buildings remained secure.

Poudre Valley Rural Electric Association shut power lines for Cedar Park and Glen Haven. Larimer County enacted fire restrictions for non-incorporated areas. Governor Jared Polis issued a disaster declaration. Speaking in Loveland, Polis and other lawmakers called upon the National Interagency Fire Center to send more resources including firefighters, engines, and incident management teams. Polis stated: "This is likely to be a several week event, even potentially a month or two, just as the last fires of 2020 were." He activated the Colorado National Guard. The Federal Emergency Management Agency recognized the disaster, according to Representative Joe Neguse, immediately funding 75% of firefighting efforts with the hope of eventual full funding. Despite a Preparedness Level 5 situation, the most pressed for firefighting activity, the National Interagency Fire Center mobilized the Southwest Complex Incident Management Team 1, noting the danger to communication and energy infrastructure.

Fire behavior was described as group torching, uphill runs and short-range spotting of timber, brush, and grass. Volatility challenged ground and aerial firefighting crews, spreading northwest, a total of 7,648 acres with 1% containment. Without verifiable flying range, aviation assets were at times limited. When safe, resources dropped water and fire retardant to help secure the fire perimeter and protect values at risk. Firefighters achieved initial containment by lighting backfires, burning vegetation ahead of the fire's advance, thereby securing the east perimeter near the Sylvan Dale Ranch staging area. Fire behavior was described as group torching, uphill runs and shortrange spotting of timber, brush, and grass.

==== National Interagency Fire Center assumes command ====
At 6am Thursday, SW CIMT 1 took over firefighting operations. Operations Section Chief Jayson Coil emphasized protecting communities as well as protecting interests along US 34. Crews worked at extending the fire line on the east perimeter north to the Cameron Peak Fire burn scar. The CIMT examined the logistic challenges of accessing areas west of the fire and documenting critical infrastructure like water treatment and gas lines. "Right now there's fires all across the West, and the competition for those resources is very high," Coil stated. Previous incident commander Mike Smith stated, "[B]ecause of the hot conditions, the winds and the steepness of the terrain, there are places that we can't go in right away." Afternoon mapping put the spread of the fire at 8089 total acres.

==== Damage assessment ====
CBS News reported preliminary indications that some homes had been destroyed. Structures damaged were in the Cedar Park subdivision near Drake. Although the number of homes damaged was unknown as of Friday, total structures damaged was estimated at 30. Using infared flight mapping, CIMT estimated the burn area at 9,053 acres with 5% containment in a Facebook post approximately 6:30 am Friday. Firefighting Friday was most intense near the unincorporated community of Drake. IMT incident commander Carl Schwope stated there were 389 personnel assigned to the fire Friday, including three Hot Shot crews of ~20 members. Late Friday, Larimer County Sheriff's Office announced 25 homes had been destroyed and four had been damaged in the vicinity of Palisade Mountain Drive and Snow Top Road.

=== Causes ===
Although the direct cause of the fire was still under investigation as of July 31, the conditions making the fire likely was attributed to record and near-record precipitation in 2023, according to assistant state climatologist Becky Bolinger. 90 days of extremely dry conditions then turned the growth into fuel.

=== Recovery ===
On Saturday, August 3, 2024, the Community Foundation of Northern Colorado pledged to assist relief efforts through the Northern Colorado Disaster Recovery Fund.

== Previous natural catastrophes ==
Although Alexander Mountain was less impacted by the 1976 Big Thompson River flood, the 2013 flood caused the destruction of the Jessup Lodge at Sylvan Dale Guest Ranch.

== Ecology ==
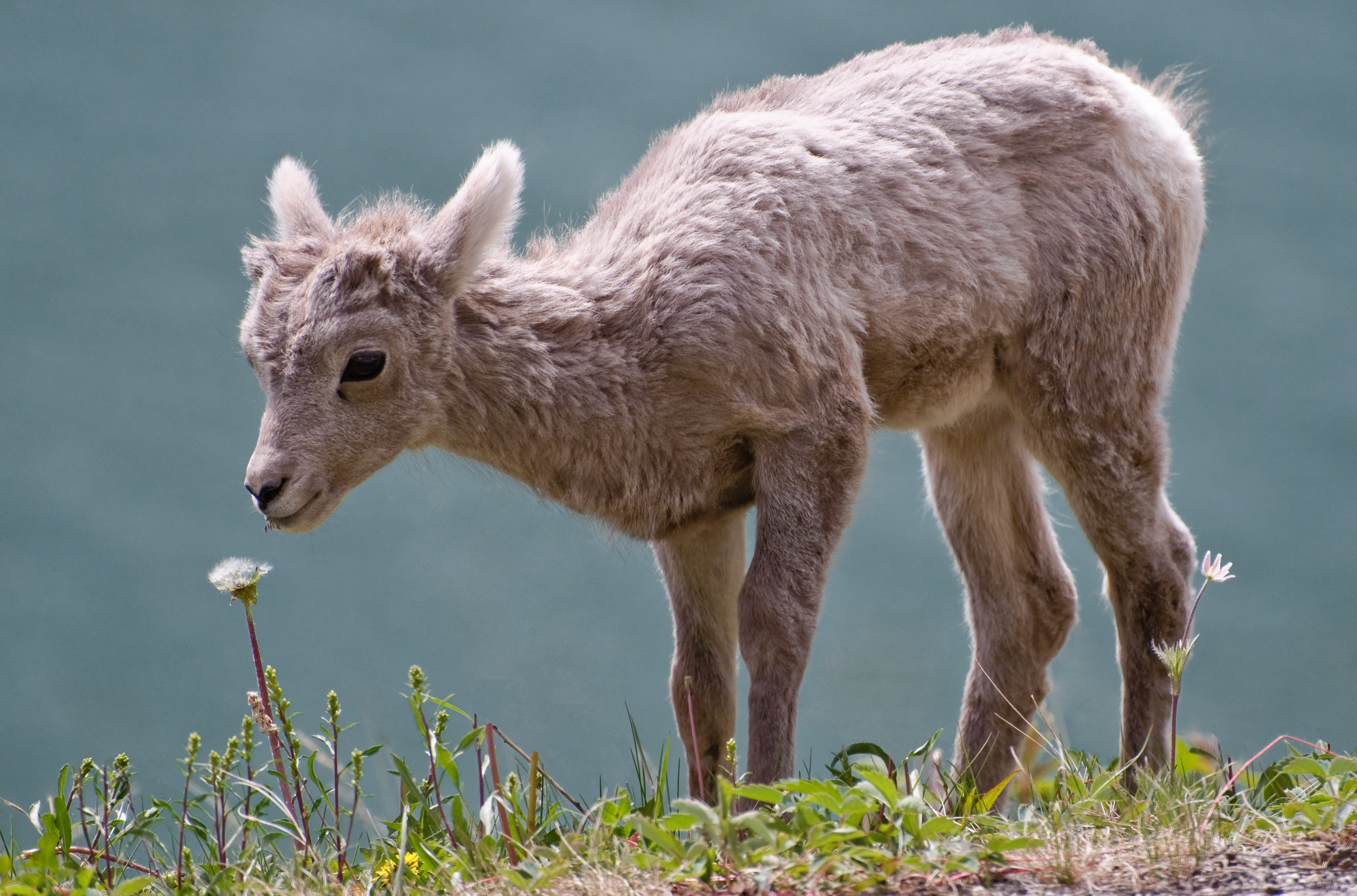
Alexander Mountain is a birthing ground for bighorn sheep

Alexander Mountain is noted for mountain mahogany within its gully and rattlesnakes near rock faces. as well as Rhus trilobata, often called skunkbrush or three-leaf sumac, known to hikers of the mountain as a hiding place for ticks. It is within a crystalline mid-elevation forest. These are an ecoregion found in Colorado and New Mexico at elevations of 7,000–9,000 ft and 8,000–10,000 ft on crystalline and metamorphic substrates. This is a predominately Southern Rocky Mountain Ponderosa Pine ecosystem with Southern Rocky Mountain Mesic and Dry-Mesic Montane Mixed Conifer Forest and Woodland on the north face coupling with Engelmann spruce with examples of gambel oak, and Rocky Mountain Lower Montane-Foothill Shrubland on the south face with pockets of grassland per Landfire. Researchers at the University of Wyoming noted currants and brambles with brome grasses and golden banners at the base. Sylvan Dale Guest Ranch notes the presence of wild turkeys and notes the importance of the mountain in the birth of bighorn sheep.

== Geology ==
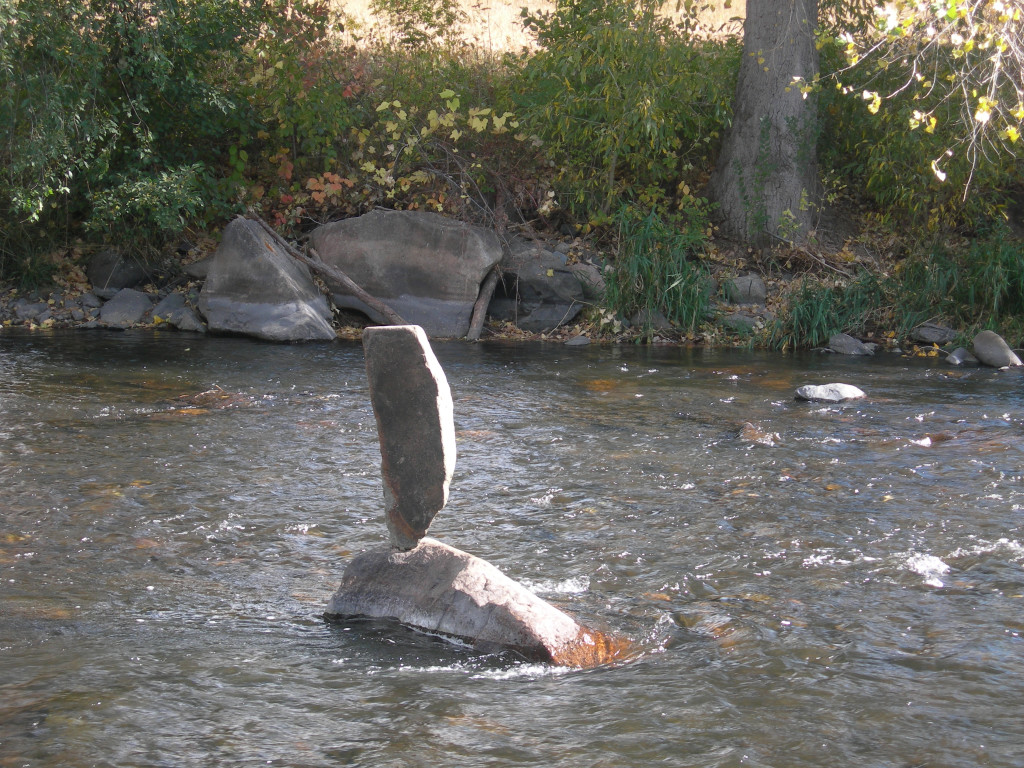
Sylvanhenge (granite) at Sylvan Dale Guest Ranch

Parts of Alexander Mountain, rock faces in particular, are Paleoproterozoic igneous granite. Igneous and metamorphic rocks date to the Precambrian Era. It is adjacent to the Fountain Formation, which intermixes with Alexander Mountain gravel at the Hansen Feeder Canal, a product of Ice Age erosion.

== Hiking ==
Alexander Mountain is considered by Alltrails to be an extremely challenging climb, through a single public access, a 1.9 mile ascent. The trails features include a 1600-foot ascent over roughly a mile. There is a gully with mountain mahogany and stone cliff faces. There is a false summit. The Sylvan Dale Guest Ranch has an easier private trail.

== See also ==
- Cameron Peak Fire
- Park Fire
- Salt Fire and South Fork Fire
- Aletes humilis

== Bibliography ==
- Chronic and Chronic's Prairie, Peak, and Plateau
- Chronic and Williams' Roadside Geology of Colorado.
