= 2013 Colorado floods =

2013 natural disaster in Colorado, United States

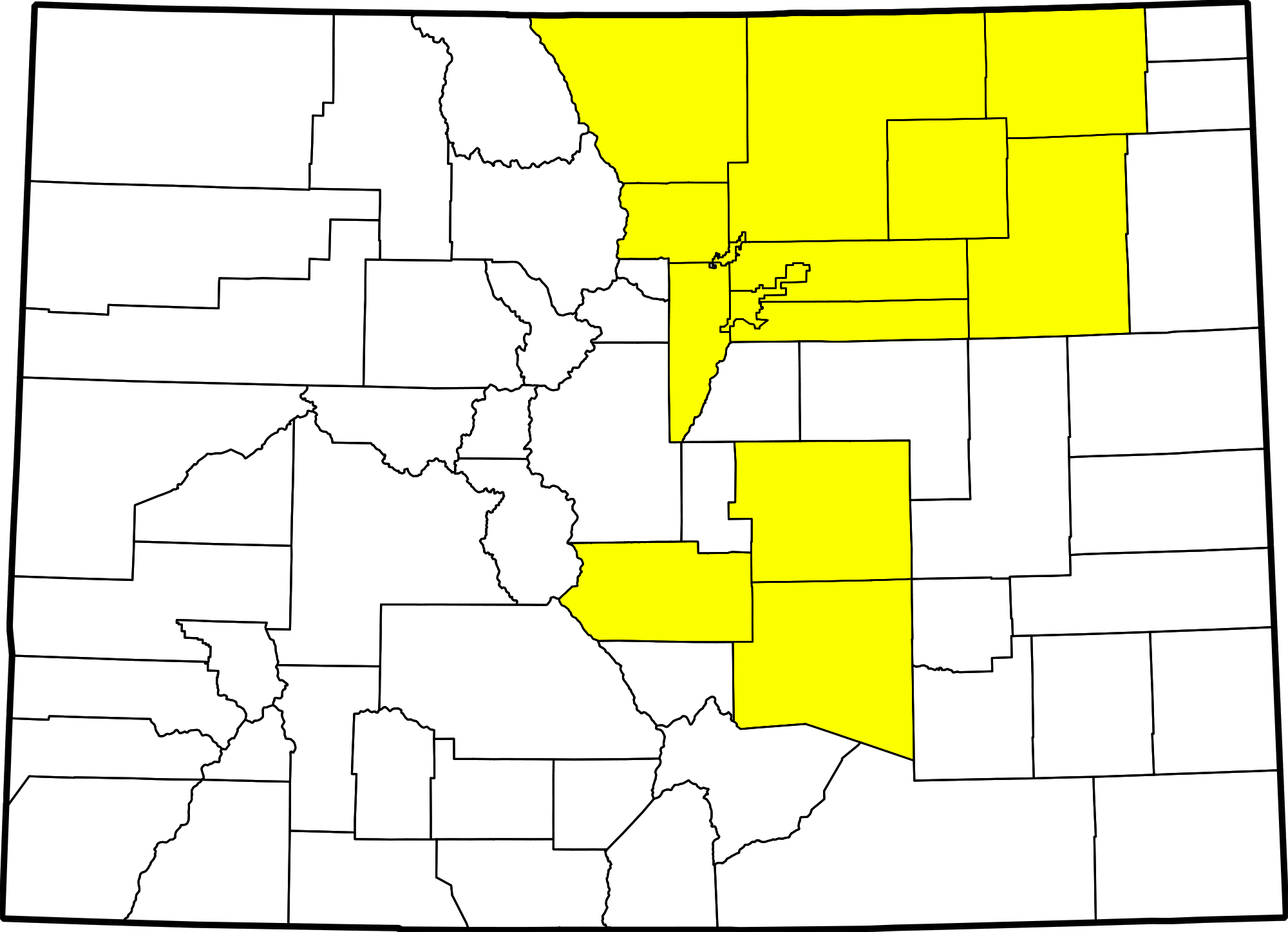
- Disaster emergencies were declared by Governor John Hickenlooper in 14 counties (highlighted) in Colorado.

Meteorological history
- Duration: September 9, 2013 – September 30, 2013

Flood
- Max. rainfall: 20 in (508.0 mm)

Overall effects
- Fatalities: 8 dead, 1 missing/presumed dead
- Damage: Estimated over $1 billion
- Areas affected: Colorado, primarily the Front Range, El Paso County and Boulder County, as well as portions of metro Denver

This is an animated loop of water vapor systems over the western area of North America on September 12, 2013, as shown by the GOES-15 and GOES-13 satellites. The storm that caused the 2013 Colorado flooding was kept in a confined area over the Eastern Range of the Rocky Mountains in Colorado by these water vapor systems.

The 2013 Colorado floods were a series of natural disasters occurring in the U.S. state of Colorado. Starting on September 11, 2013, a slow-moving cold front stalled over Colorado, clashing with warm humid monsoonal air from the south. This resulted in heavy rain and catastrophic flooding along Colorado's Front Range from Colorado Springs north to Fort Collins. The situation intensified on September 11 and 12. Boulder County was worst hit, with 9.08 inches (231 mm) recorded September 12 and up to 18 inches (460 mm) of rain recorded by September 15, which is comparable to Boulder County's average annual precipitation (20.7 inches, 525 mm). This event has also been referred to as the 2013 Colorado Front Range Flood, reflecting a more precise geographic extent in and along the Colorado Front Range mountains.

The National Weather Service's Hydrometeorological Design Studies Center stated in a document that the annual exceedance probability (AEP) for the entire rainfall event was as low as 1/1000 (0.1%) in places.

The flood waters spread across a range of almost 200 miles (320 km) from north to south, affecting 17 counties. Governor John Hickenlooper declared a disaster emergency on September 12, 2013, in 14 counties: Adams, Arapahoe, Broomfield, Boulder, Denver, El Paso, Fremont, Jefferson, Larimer, Logan, Morgan, Pueblo, Washington and Weld. By September 15, federal emergency declarations covered those 14 counties as well as Clear Creek County.

== Background ==
The state of Colorado had been experiencing varying levels of drought prior to the week of storms starting on September 9. The U.S. Drought Monitor stated that "The combination of ample Gulf and Pacific tropical moisture (in part from Tropical Storms Manuel (Pacific) and Ingrid (Gulf) which inundated Mexico), stalled frontal systems, and upsloping conditions produced the widespread rainfall [along Colorado's Front Range]." This resulted in rainfall totals exceeding 20 inches in parts of Boulder County, along with numerous flash floods, property destruction and loss of life.

== Historic Flooding ==
Colorado has a semi-arid climate and a history of flash flooding. The earliest recorded flood in Boulder was the great flood of 1894 which came down Boulder Canyon and flooded most of the downtown area. In 1965 another flood hit Colorado.

The Big Thompson River begins around Estes Park in northern Colorado and flows east into Big Thompson Canyon. On July 31, 1976, the Big Thompson Flood of 1976 struck. 8 inches of rainfall fell in the first hour alone; 12 inches fell in the first three hours. The flash flooding killed 144 people and caused $35 million worth of damage, or roughly $140 million in 2013.

Comparatively, the 2013 flood was caused by approximately 15 inches of rainfall over the span of a week, killed 8 people, and caused $2 billion in damage. The rainfall in 2013 exceeded that of the 1976 event, but the flooding was more intense in 1976 because the rainfall that fell occurred in a much shorter time frame. To illustrate this: in 2013, The Big Thompson River experienced peak flow rates near Loveland, CO of 4,500 CFS (127.43 cubic meters per second) before the measuring gauge was destroyed by floodwaters, whereas, in 1976, the same area of the river saw peak flow rates of 31,200 cubic feet per second (880 cubic meters per second).

== Impact ==
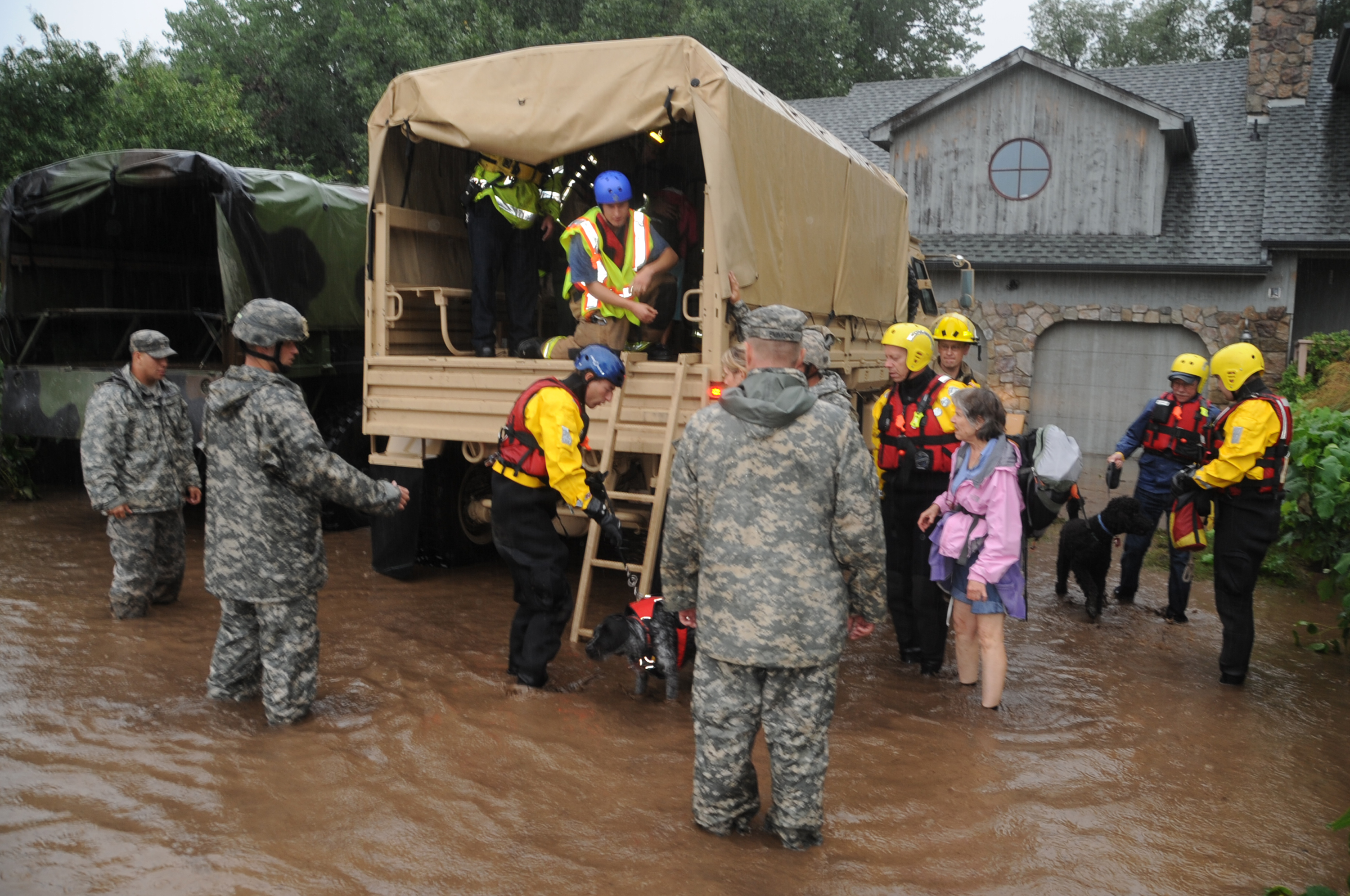
Colorado National Guardsmen respond to floods in Boulder County.

At least eight deaths were reported by the Colorado Office of Emergency Management, with two more missing and presumed dead and hundreds remaining unaccounted for. More than 11,000 were evacuated. The town of Lyons in Boulder County was isolated by the flooding of St. Vrain Creek, and several earth dams along the Front Range burst or were over-topped. On September 12, Boulder Creek was reported to have exceeded 5,000 cubic feet (140 m^{3}) of water per second. Boulder Creek regularly flows around 150–200 cubic feet (4.2–5.7 m^{3}) per second. This caused serious damage to buildings along the creek and the creek path such as Boulder High School. As of late September 13, according to the Office of Emergency Management, there were 172 people unaccounted for and at least three dead in flood areas of Boulder County. By September 14, the death toll had reached five and more than 500 were unaccounted for, but not necessarily considered missing.

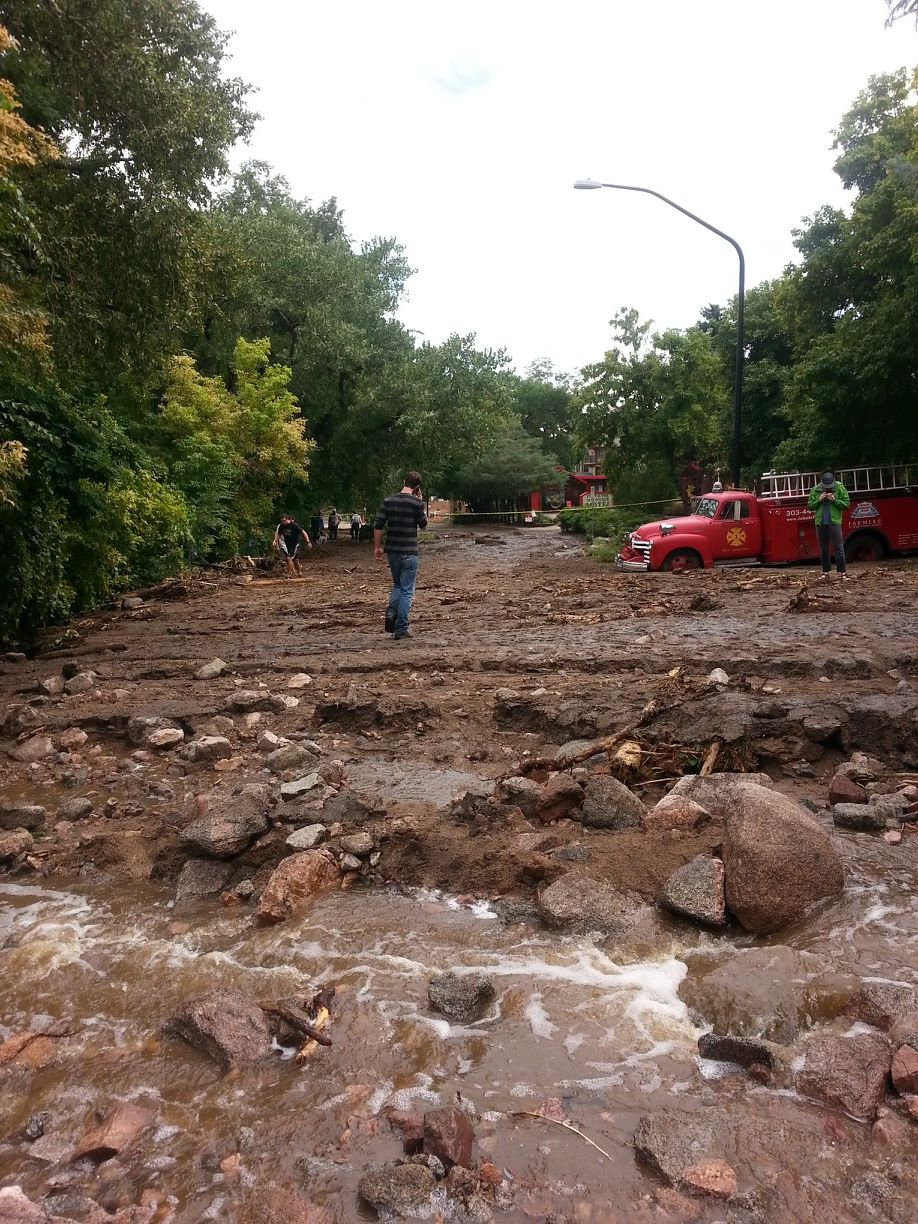
Boulder residents survey the damage on Friday, September 13.

At least 1,750 people and 300 pets have been rescued by air and ground. Rescue efforts were hampered by continuing rain and a low cloud ceiling, which grounded National Guard helicopters September 15.

Nearly 19,000 homes were damaged, and over 1,500 were destroyed. The Colorado Department of Transportation estimates that at least 30 state highway bridges were destroyed and an additional 20 are seriously damaged, with repairs for damaged bridges and roads expected to cost many millions of dollars. Miles of freight and passenger rail lines were washed out or submerged, including a section servicing Amtrak's iconic California Zephyr.

Rainfall totals recorded by the Community Collaborative Rain, Hail and Snow Network (CoCoRaHS) from September 9–15, 2013 show significant totals in the Aurora, Boulder and Estes Park areas with several locations in the city of Boulder recording 15 to 20 inches (380 to 510 mm) of rain.

=== Impact by county ===
- Aurora in Arapahoe County experienced flash flooding with up to 2.27 inches (5.8 cm) of rain in a six-hour period.
- Rainfall over five days in Boulder County exceeded the county's annual average. Three deaths have been confirmed in Boulder County. Over 1,600 were evacuated, with 262 homes destroyed and nearly 300 more damaged. Nearly 900 square miles (2,300 km^{2}) were damaged by flooding. Roads suffered extensive damage in Big Thompson Canyon and Buckhorn Canyon, with some sections completely washed away. Maps of the flooding are available on the Boulder County Government website. Jamestown experienced losses of 20% of homes and 50% of roads, with one fatality reported.
- The Denver metro area experienced more flooding in the eastern part of the county, and the city itself received 3.72 inches of rain during the flood.
- Fountain Creek in El Paso County flooded, with the municipalities of Fort Carson reporting close to 19 inches of precipitation and Colorado Springs reporting one fatality.
- In Jefferson County, Colorado, flooding in Coal Creek Canyon damaged Highway 72 to the point of closure, and it re-opened in November 2013. The town of Evergreen had a Level 1 evacuation notice when Bear Creek (Colorado) reached a flood stage of 9 feet.
- Larimer County was also hit hard, with 1,120 square miles (2,900 km^{2}) affected by flooding, and 1,500 homes and 200 businesses destroyed. An additional 4,500 homes and 500 businesses were estimated to be damaged. Extensive road damage in Big Thompson Canyon cut off-road access to the communities of Drake, Glen Haven, and Cedar Park. Three dams also failed in the county. Both U.S. Highway 36 and U.S. Highway 34, the major routes into the tourist town of Estes Park, were severely damaged. Hundreds of Estes Park residents were also isolated by the destruction of sections of Fish Creek Road and all nine crossings across Fish Creek. Damaged sewer lines dumped raw sewage down the creek and into the Big Thompson River.
- In Logan County the South Platte River flooded, cresting at 11.2 feet. A No Flush Limited Water Use Order was in effect during the flood, and 73 miles of asphalt and dirt roads were damaged.
- In Morgan County, the communities of Goodrich, Orchard, and Weldona were placed under an immediate evacuation order the morning of September 14. Floodwaters reached 13 feet high.
- Weld County, in northeast Colorado, was flooded by the overflow of the South Platte River. Flooding in Weld County affected 3,000 homes, over 350 commercial properties, and 2,377 agricultural parcels. 122 bridges were damaged, and 654 lane-miles of road in Weld County were either damaged by flooding or under standing water. Portions of Greeley, the county seat, were under mandatory evacuation, and whole neighborhoods in Greeley and nearby Evans were submerged after days of flooding. The shutdown of a wastewater treatment facility in Evans put remaining residents on restrictions including not to flush their toilets, do laundry, or bathe.

=== Economic impact ===
Lower-lying agricultural land in northeast Colorado was affected as flood waters surged down rivers and creeks, inundating fields and pastures. Significant crop damage is expected from standing water that has no way to drain from fields.

Hundreds of oil and gas wells were shut down in the Denver Basin, many of which were under rushing water, and reports of broken lines and storage tanks swept away by the flood waters raised concerns of contamination. A spill from flood-damaged storage tanks in Milliken was reported September 18, which released 5,250 US gallons (19,900 L; 4,370 imp gal) of crude oil into the South Platte River.

The IRS announced that it would extend filing and payment deadlines for flood victims.

=== Hazardous impacts ===
Structures located in high risk flood zones were soon inundated. Sewage treatment plants affected by the flood waters released 20 million gallons of raw sewage as well as 150–270 million gallons of partially treated sewage, as estimated by the State health department. What resulted is higher levels of E. coli, some as high as 472–911 colonies per millimeter of water (126 colonies per millimeter of water is considered unsafe). The Colorado Oil and Gas Conservation Commission (COGCC) reports that oil lines and containment facilities failed and leaked a total of 1,027 barrels (viz. 43,134 gallons) of oil. The COGCC is monitoring 13 substantial leaks as of October 8, 2013. The COGCC is also monitoring 17 substantial leaks of produced water, or water that is used in the refinement of oil products and is considered waste water. The COGCC reports that 26,385 gallons of such water has leaked into flood waters. Over 50,000 fracking wells – a mining process utilized in the extraction of oil form the Earth – operate in the state of Colorado and 1,900 fracking wells were flooded at the peak flood levels. This number has since been reduced to around 1,300 wells. Concerns have been raised about the safety of such wells in a flood situation. The produced water from these operations sit in open pits and easily mix with flood waters and deposit toxic substances like lead or other sediments across the state.

=== Ecological impacts ===
Scientific reports that show the ecological impacts of the flooding are not readily available because this is such a recent event. Past studies on the ecological impacts of flash flooding can give insight on what may happen. Temporal succession has been studied in areas that experience flash flooding regularly. In these instances, typical biological processes characteristic to the area pre-flood resume within 2–3 weeks. The 2013 Colorado flooding is a more complex case because of the close contact with human society. Contamination from sewage, oil, and waste water containing toxic substances can delay natural succession processes if not alter them entirely. For example, waste water from flooded fracking wells could introduce levels of lead into a freshwater system, keeping a particular strain of algae from developing in usual successional form. The hierarchy of development is now delayed or shifted into an entirely different direction. Pollution from the floodwaters could also affect species in ways not related to succession. For example, animals relying on natural freshwater systems as a source for water can contract fatal illnesses as a result of the higher levels of E. coli bacteria in the water due to sewage leaks caused by the flooding.

=== Media response ===
Local media such as 9News, 7News, FOX 31 and more covered the event for its whole duration.

== Relief ==
=== Federal aid ===
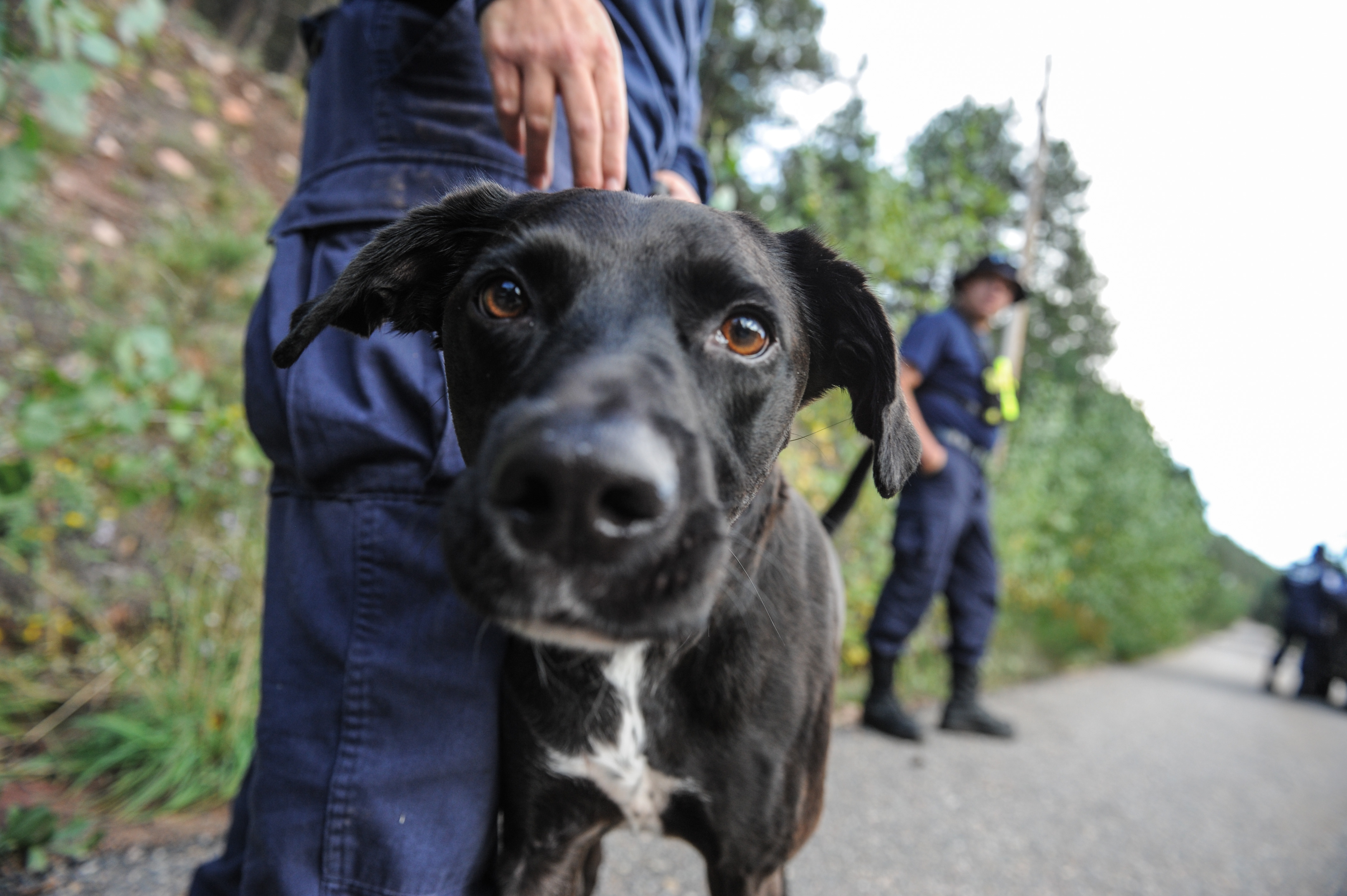
A rescue dog from the Federal Urban Search and Rescue task force for the floods.

President Barack Obama first declared a state of emergency for Boulder, El Paso, and Larimer counties, with an additional 12 counties added September 16: Adams, Arapahoe, Broomfield, Clear Creek, Denver, Fremont, Jefferson, Morgan, Logan, Pueblo, Washington and Weld counties. This authorized federal search and rescue teams, as well as supplies such as food, water, cots, generators, and emergency flood control measures. Obama also declared a major disaster specifically for Boulder County, which provides for federal recovery assistance such as temporary housing, home repairs, and low-cost loans.

On September 25, 2013, Rep. Cory Gardner (R-CO) introduced the bill To authorize the Secretary of Transportation to obligate funds for emergency relief projects arising from damage caused by severe weather events in 2013 (H.R. 3174; 113th Congress). If passed, the bill would "exempt Colorado from a cap on funding, contained in Division A of Public Law 113-2 (The Disaster Relief Appropriations Act, 2013), from the Federal Aid Highways Emergency Relief program of $100 million per emergency incident." When arguing in favor of the bill, Rep. Cory Gardner cited the statistics that the flood affected "two hundred mile-lanes of highway."

The shutdown of the United States federal government from October 1–17, 2013 stopped federal relief aid funding going to recovery efforts in Colorado. The state of Colorado began paying the National Guard for continuing relief efforts until the Federal Emergency Management Agency (FEMA) could reimburse the State government at the end of the shutdown. The state hopes to be reimbursed for at least 75% of the funds.

The shutdown compromise signed on October 17, 2013, includes funding for Colorado relief efforts, specifically referencing Rep. Gardner's bill H.R. 3174; 113th Congress. The cap typically set at $100 million has been raised to $450 million in light of Colorado's current conditions. It is not uncommon for this cap to be raised for disaster struck areas such as those states hit by Hurricane Sandy or Hurricane Katrina.

=== Other aid ===
The American Red Cross, The Salvation Army, Save the Children, the United Way, the Air Land Emergency Resource Team, Boulder Flood Relief, and Helping Pets are among the organizations accepting donations on behalf of flood victims.

=== Post-flood CDOT road projects ===
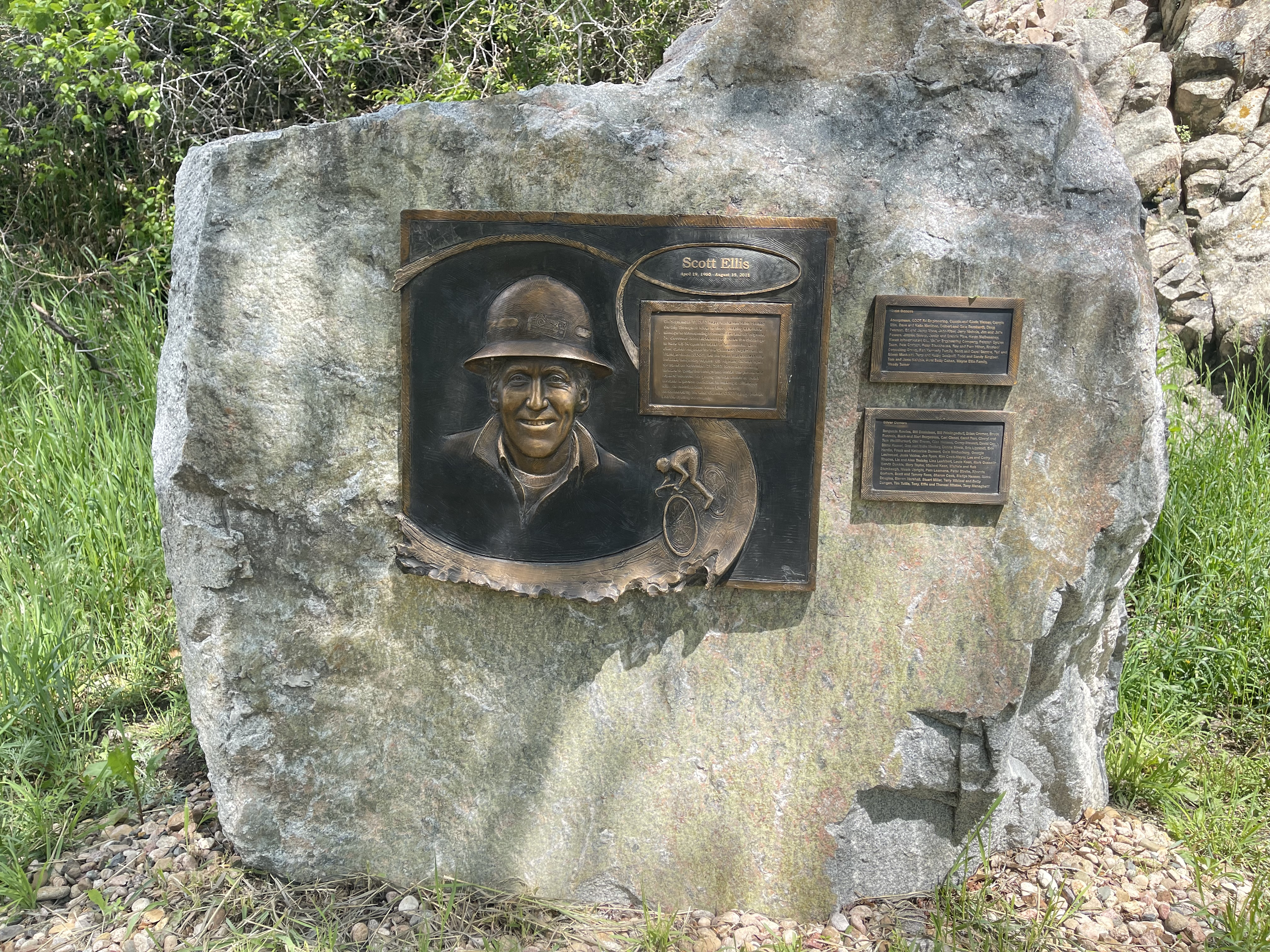
Memorial dedicated to CDOT engineer Scott Ellis, whom led repairs on US Highway 34 before his death in August 2015, in Big Thompson Canyon (May 27, 2025)

Following the floods, the Colorado Department of Transportation (CDOT) initiated 200 permanent repair projects to roads. Due to the floods being a federal disaster, CDOT paid only 20% of the $750 million expenses, with five related to Rocky Mountain National Park being entirely federally-funded. High traffic areas like US Highway 34 were a priority, with new infrastructure in its instance being built on dry lands. Early projects such as these were also hastened by Governor John Hickenlooper's 60-day goal for reopening certain areas. In May 2022, the completion of a project on Colorado State Highway 7 in St. Vrain Canyon marked the end of flood-related repairs.

== See also ==
- Floods in the United States before 1901
- Floods in the United States: 1901–2000
- Floods in the United States: 2001–present
- 2013 Alberta floods
- 1976 Big Thompson Flood
