= Bitter Creek =

Bitter Creek may refer to:

- Bitter Creek, Texas, a ghost town in Nolan County
- Bitter Creek (South Dakota)
- Bitter Creek (Utah), a tributary of the White River
- Bitter Creek (Wyoming), a tributary of the Green River
- Bitter Creek National Wildlife Refuge, in Kern County, California
- Bitter Creek (film), a 1954 American Western film
- Bitter Creek, a song from the Eagles' album Desperado
- George “Bittercreek” Newcomb, a member of the Wild Bunch
