= Rowe Glacier =

Glacier in Colorado, United States

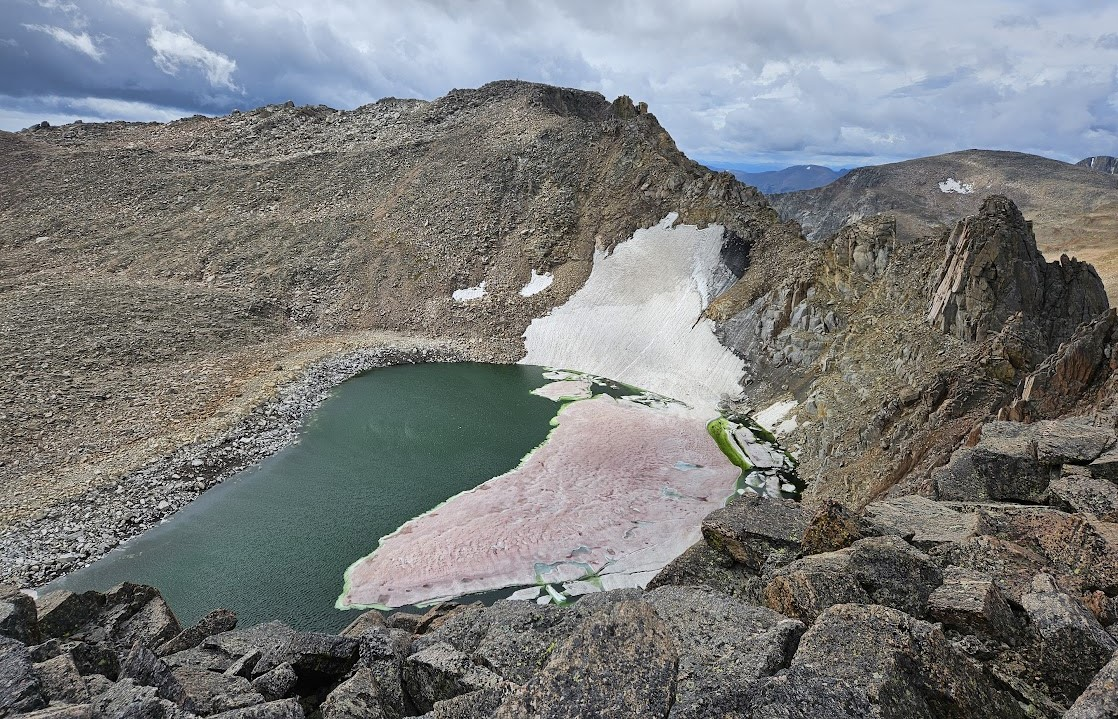

- Location within Colorado
- Type: Mountain glacier
- Location: Larimer County, Colorado, United States
- Coordinates: 40°29′18″N 105°38′46″W
- Terminus: Talus/proglacial lake
- Status: Retreating

Rowe Glacier is an alpine glacier in Rocky Mountain National Park in the U.S. state of Colorado. It is 300 yd (270 m) north of Hagues Peak and the source of the North Fork Big Thompson River. Rowe Glacier was the first glacier to be identified in Colorado.

== See also ==
- List of glaciers in the United States
