= North Fork Big Thompson River =

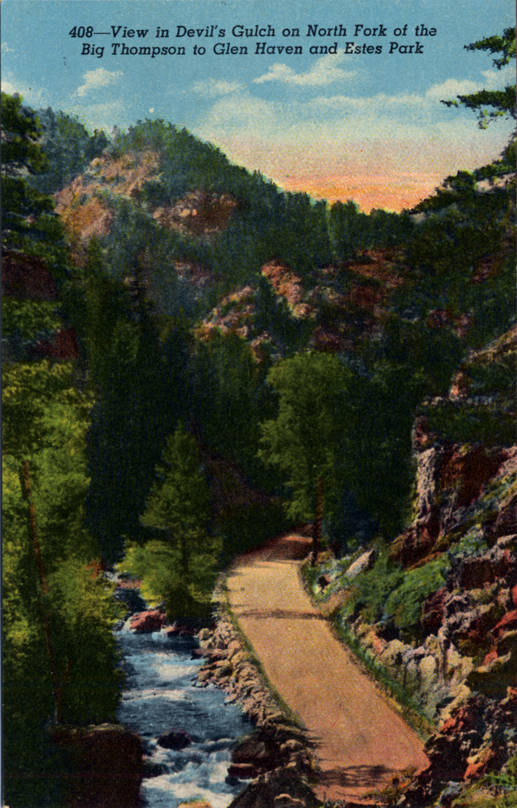

- Location of mouth

Physical characteristics
- Source
  - coordinates: 40°29′20″N 105°38′38″W
  - elevation: 13,120 ft (4,000 m)
- Mouth
  - location: Confluence with Big Thompson
  - coordinates: 40°25′57″N 105°20′20″W
  - elevation: 6,152 ft (1,875 m)

Basin features
- Progression: Big Thompson; South Platte—Platte; Missouri—Mississippi

The North Fork Big Thompson River is a 22.7-mile-long (36.5 km) tributary of the Big Thompson River in Larimer County, Colorado. The river's source is Rowe Glacier on the north slope of Hagues Peak, in the Mummy Range of Rocky Mountain National Park. It flows through Lake Dunraven, over Lost Falls and through Glen Haven before a confluence with the Big Thompson in Drake.

== See also ==
- List of rivers of Colorado
