= H.R. 3174 (113th Congress) =

- Long title: To authorize the Secretary of Transportation to obligate funds for emergency relief projects arising from damage caused by severe weather events in 2013, and for other purposes.
- Announced in: the 113th United States Congress
- Sponsored by: Rep. Cory Gardner (R-CO)
- Number of co-sponsors: 6

Codification
- Titles affected: 23 U.S.C. § 125
- Agencies affected: United States Department of Transportation

Legislative history
- Introduced in the House as H.R. 3174 by Rep. Cory Gardner (R-CO) on September 25, 2013; Committee consideration by United States House Committee on Transportation and Infrastructure; Passed the House on September 30, 2013 (voice vote)

The bill H.R. 3174, long title "To authorize the Secretary of Transportation to obligate funds for emergency relief projects arising from damage caused by severe weather events in 2013, and for other purposes," is a bill that was introduced in the United States House of Representatives during the 113th United States Congress. The bill would allow the United States Department of Transportation to "exceed a $100 million cap on grants to repair roads damaged by a national emergency." The bill was written in response to the 2013 Colorado floods, which caused as much as $500 million worth of damage to Colorado's roads.

== Background ==
The 2013 Colorado floods were a natural disaster that occurred in the U.S. state of Colorado. During the week starting on September 9, 2013, a slow-moving cold front stalled over Colorado, clashing with warm humid monsoonal air from the south. This resulted in heavy rain and catastrophic flooding along Colorado's Front Range from Colorado Springs north to Fort Collins. The situation intensified on September 11 and 12. Boulder County was the worst hit, with 9.08 inches (231 mm) recorded September 12 and up to 17 inches (430 mm) of rain recorded by September 15, which is comparable to Boulder County's average annual precipitation (20.7 inches, 525 mm).

The flood waters spread across a range of almost 200 miles (320 km) from north to south, affecting 17 counties. Governor John Hickenlooper declared a disaster emergency on September 13, 2013, in 14 counties: Adams, Arapahoe, Broomfield, Boulder, Denver, El Paso, Fremont, Jefferson, Larimer, Logan, Morgan, Pueblo, Washington and Weld. By September 15, federal emergency declarations covered those 14 counties as well as Clear Creek County.

== Provisions of the bill ==
H.R. 3174 would exempt Colorado from a cap on funding, contained in Division A of Public Law 113-2 (The Disaster Relief Appropriations Act, 2013), from the Federal Aid Highways Emergency Relief program of $100 million per emergency incident. Under the bill, the Congressional Budget Office (CBO) estimates that $300 million of funds made available for the Emergency Relief Program in Public Law 113-2 would be used in Colorado to repair roads damaged by flooding in 2013. The CBO estimates that by using those funds in Colorado in fiscal year 2014 instead of on emergency repair projects in other states in future years, the pace of spending of that money would be slightly faster over the 2014-2015 period but slower in later years and thus result in no net change in direct spending over the 2014-2023 period.

== Procedural history ==
=== House ===
H.R. 3174 was introduced in the House on September 25, 2013, by Rep. Cory Gardner (R-CO). It was referred to the United States House Committee on Transportation and Infrastructure. On September 30, 2013, newspaper The Hill reported that the House was expected to consider H.R. 3174 under a suspension of the rules later that day. The bill passed by voice vote on September 30, 2013.

== Debate and discussion ==
When arguing in favor of the bill, Rep. Cory Gardner cited the statistics that the flood effected "two hundred mile lines of highway." The fact that a similar bill had been sponsored by Colorado's senators in the Senate was considered "an indication that the bill has a good chance of passing in the Senate."

== See also ==
- List of bills in the 113th United States Congress
- 2013 Colorado floods
- Disaster Relief Appropriations Act, 2013
