= 1976 Big Thompson River flood =

1976 flood in Colorado

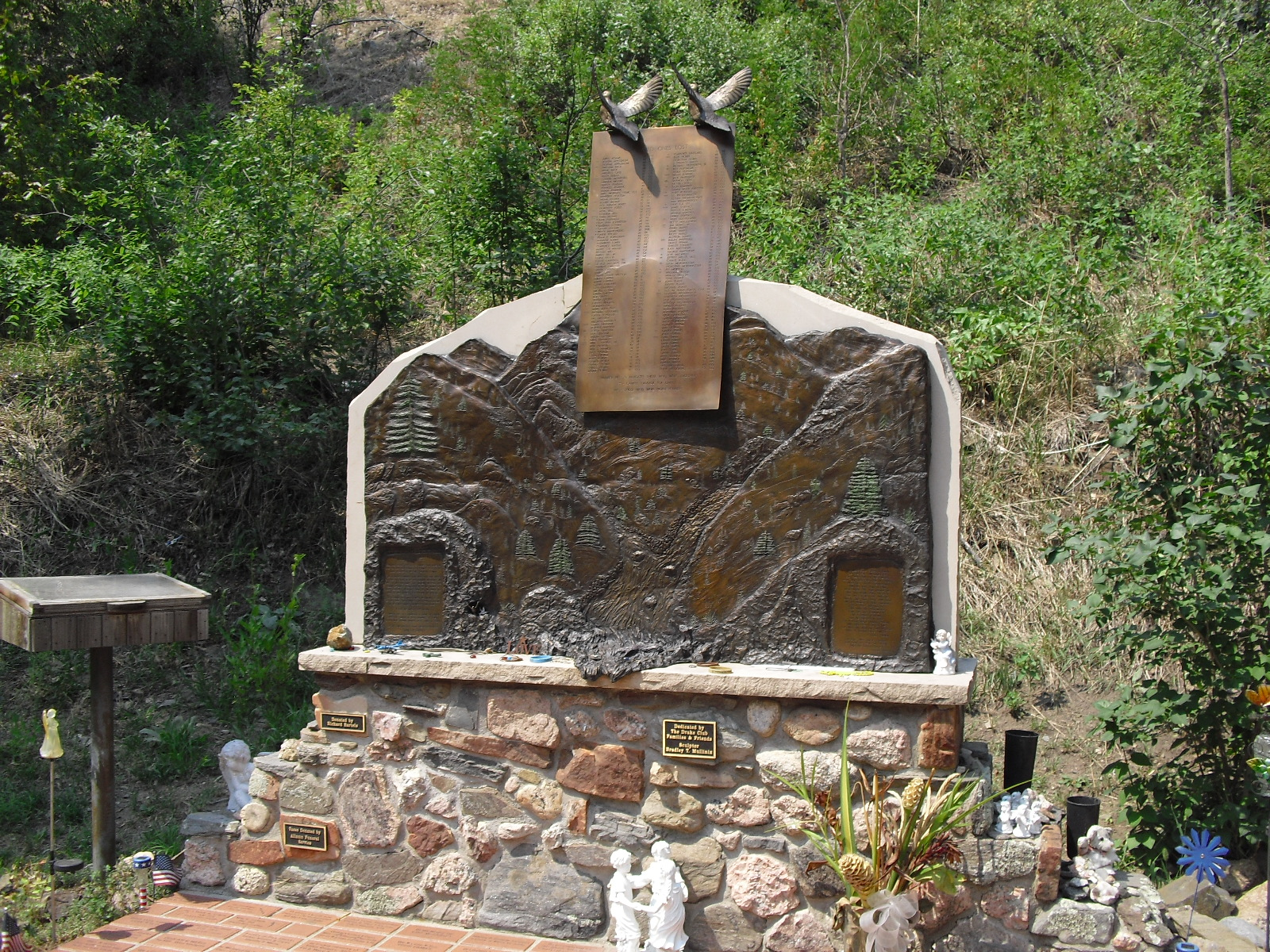
- A memorial containing a list of people killed in the flood
- Cause: Heavy rains

Meteorological history
- Duration: July 31, 1976

Flood

Overall effects
- Fatalities: 144
- Injuries: >250
- Missing: 5
- Damage: <$150 million (2016 USD)
- Areas affected: Big Thompson River, north central Colorado
- Houses destroyed: 418

On July 31, 1976, heavy rainfall caused the Big Thompson River in Colorado to flood, causing at least 144 deaths, more than 250 injuries, and at least 5 others to be missing. The flood was caused by a stalled thunderstorm complex that produced rainfall totals of 12–14 inches (300–360 mm) near Estes Park, Colorado, including 7.5 inches (190 mm) of rain that fell in one hour. Cresting at 30 feet (9.1 m), the flood caused widespread damage along the river totaling almost $40 million ($150 million in 2016 USD). It is considered one of the deadliest floods in the state's history.

== Background ==
The Big Thompson River is a tributary of the South Platte River, approximately 78 miles (126 km) long, in the U.S. state of Colorado. Originating in Forest Canyon in Rocky Mountain National Park, the river flows into Lake Estes in the town of Estes Park, and then through Big Thompson Canyon.

Before the flood, 600 people lived in Big Thompson Canyon. In addition, between 2,500 and 3,500 people were there on July 31 to celebrate the 100th anniversary of Colorado's statehood on August 1.

== Meteorological synopsis ==
On July 31, a thunderstorm complex developed alongside the Front Range of the southern Rocky Mountains near Estes Park. The development was caused by a number of meteorological factors, including a shortwave trough, a polar front that moved across southeastern Colorado with the main polar airmass northeast of the Front Range, and moisture and unstable air behind a cold front extending across the Big Thompson River valley. Upper-atmospheric light winds caused the thunderstorm complex to remain stationary, which produced heavy rainfall across portions of the Big Thompson Canyon, including up to 7.5 inches (190 mm) of rain falling in one hour. Over four hours near Estes Park, 12–14 inches (300–360 mm) of rain fell, causing the Big Thompson River to overflow its banks and triggering a flood surge that moved along the river and into Big Thompson Canyon. The flood moved at an average speed of 15 miles per hour (24 km/h), and crested at 30 feet (9.1 m). A flash flood warning was issued at 23:00 CDT, but the timing of this was criticized because it was issued several hours after the floods began.

== Impact and aftermath ==
A portion of U.S. Route 34 was washed out by floodwaters, sustaining significant damage as visibility on the highway dropped to zero miles. The flood impacted most of Cedar Cove, Drake, and Midway, and causing extensive damage to buildings in Glen Haven. The floods caused more than $40 million in damage in 1976 USD, equivalent to nearly $150 million in 2016 USD, including 418 homes, more than 400 vehicles, and 152 businesses being destroyed, along with a further 138 buildings damaged. The flood swept people as far east as Interstate 25 and areas 25 miles (40 km) away. Mudslides caused by heavy rainfall also closed Poudre Canyon. It is considered one of the deadliest floods in the history of Colorado, causing at least 144 deaths and 250 injuries, along with at least 5 missing.

On August 1, over 800 people were evacuated from flood-impacted areas via helicopter, and were taken to a high school in Loveland, Colorado that was established as a rescue center by the American Red Cross. U.S. Route 34 was reopened 86 days after it was closed after portions of the highway were washed out. United States President Gerald Ford designated Larimer County, Colorado a disaster area. For 25 years after the flood, until 2001, a ceremony was held annually to remember the disaster. It was held at a memorial constructed off U.S. Route 34, several miles from Drake, containing a list of people killed during the flood; this memorial was constructed in 1978, two years after the tragedy.

== In popular culture ==
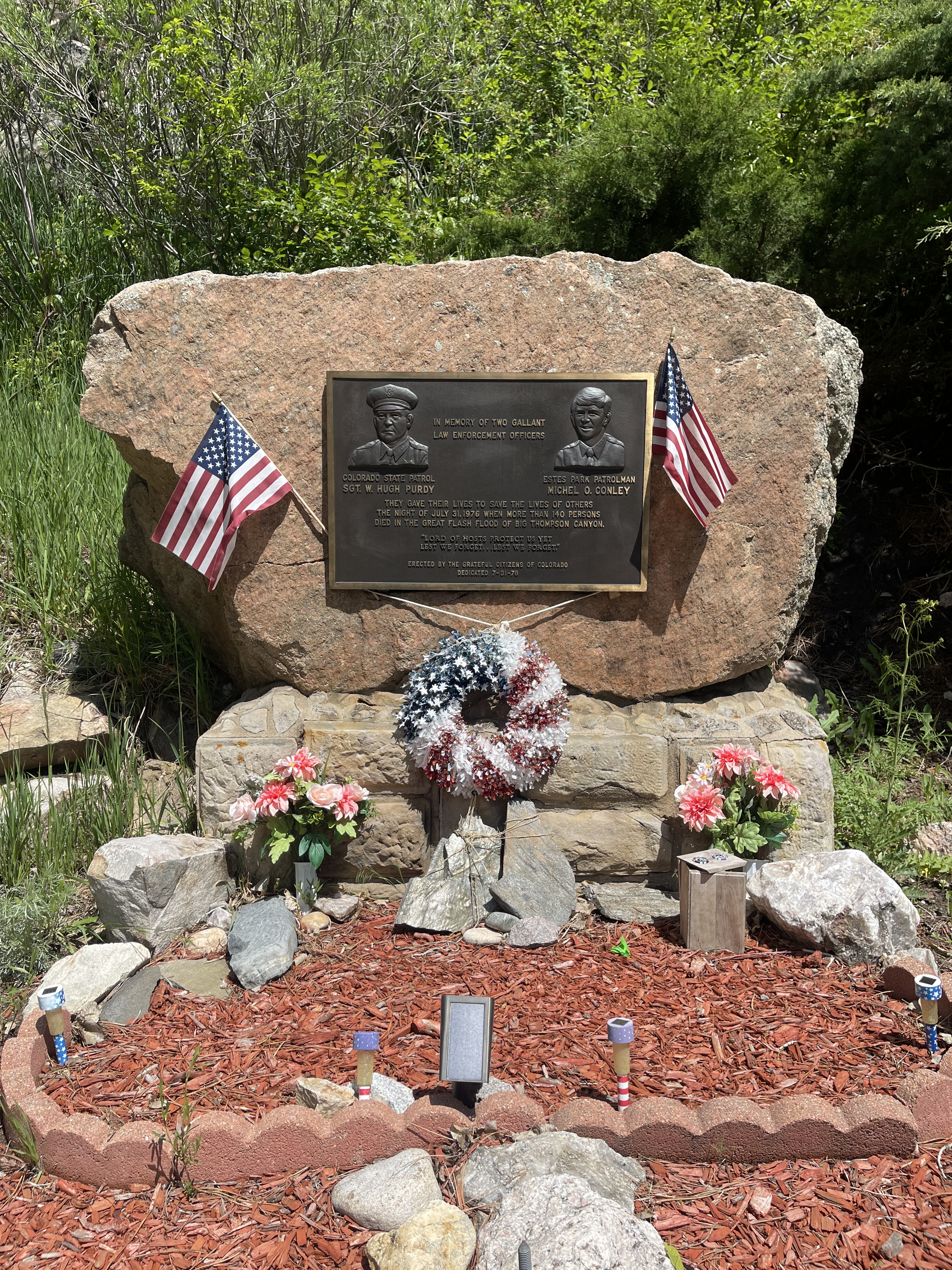
Memorial dedicated to Colorado State Patrolman W. Hugh Purdy and Estes Park Patrolman Michel O. Conley erected on July 31, 1978 in Big Thompson Canyon (May 27, 2025)

The Colorado country music singer Chuck Pyle wrote a song titled "Here Comes the Water" celebrating the actions of Colorado State Patrol Sgt. Willis Hugh Purdy, who raced the flood down the canyon warning residents. On October 2, 2016, an episode of Colorado Experience premiered on PBS regarding the disaster.

== See also ==
- Floods in the United States (1900–1999)

== Sources ==
- Crow, Deserai A.; Albright, Elizabeth A. (2021). Community Disaster Recovery: Moving from Vulnerability to Resilience. Cambridge University Press. ISBN 978-1-316-51164-0.
