= Cheley Colorado Camps =

US children's summer camp

Coordinates: 40.319°N 105.516°W

{{{name}}}
- Interactive map of {{{name}}}
- Location: Estes Park, Colorado
- Type: Summer Camp
- Established: 1921
- Slogan: "Great things happen when youth and mountains meet" – Frank H. Cheley
- Website: cheley.com

Cheley Colorado Camps (also known as Cheley, Cheley Camps, and Camp Cheley) is a residential summer camp in the Estes Park Valley. Cheley is located at two sites: Land O'Peaks Ranch in Estes Park, Colorado, which houses three girls' units and three boys' units, and Trail's End Ranch for Boys and Girls in Glen Haven, Colorado. Since 1921, Cheley Colorado Camps has had around 50,000 campers. Cheley hosts over 1,200 campers each summer.

== History ==
Cheley Colorado Camps was established on the shores of Bear Lake in Rocky Mountain National Park in 1921 by Frank Cheley. Originally, it was named the Bear Lake Trail School: An Alpine Summer Camp for Boys. In its first summer, the Bear Lake Trail School gave nine boys instruction on outdoor subjects such as camping, forestry, botany, birds, geology, orienteering and horsemanship. In 1926, Frank Cheley opened Camp Chipeta, named for the wife of Chief Ouray, chief of the Ute tribe. Following the success of Camp Haiyaha and Camp Chipeta, Cheley sought to provide campers with a more rustic experience. In 1937, he opened Boys' Trail's End (BTE) and, in 1941, he opened Girl's Trail's End. Following Frank Cheley's death in 1941, his son and his wife led the camp for 40 years. They then entrusted its leadership to their son and his wife. As of 2005, Cheley Colorado Camps remained under family leadership.

=== Code of Living ===
Rather than a fixed set of values, Frank Cheley proposed a system that evolved with society. The 'Code of Living' is a compilation of traits suggested by the campers in each unit that the campers strive to uphold throughout the term. Every term (every summer), each unit, unit staff, and support staff form their own Code of Living. The Code of Living for each term often takes the form of written – and signed – set of standards and values (e.g., traits like respect, integrity, grit).

The 'Blue Kerchief' (BK) represents the Code of Living, and is a "symbol of commitment to the Cheley Experience". All campers and staff receive a BK during a ceremony.

Citizenship awards are voted upon at the end of the camp session by counselors and other campers. They recognize individual campers for following the Code of Living, helping others, assisting counselors, and conducting themselves to a high standard.

== Activities and facilities ==
Cheley campers can participate in mountain biking, whitewater rafting, paddleboarding, horseback riding, hiking, backpacking, crafts, archery, riflery, sports, high ropes, and low ropes.

Cheley's facilities include five horseback riding rings, a climbing wall, a gymnasium, a fleet of mountain bikes, a low and high ropes course, a grassy amphitheater with a lighted stage, a soccer field, a fishing pond, and facilities for working with leather, paints, ceramics, and wood. Cheley's lodges and log cabins date from the 1920s.

== Program recognitions ==
Campers may receive recognition for their participation and achievements in the form of a patch on their blue kerchief. These awards and patches are earned, by individual campers, for challenging themselves in certain areas. The early camp patches, in the 1920s, were colored patches representing special sets of tests and were sewn on the kerchief. They were awarded for Citizenship, Horsemanship, Science, Guide, Physical Development, Mountaineering, First Aid, and Camp Improvement. Since then, the patches and awards have evolved, and program patches now include hiking, outcamping, horsemanship, climbing, mountain biking, backpacking, and sleuthing.

More difficult to achieve, requiring more than one summer, are the Trail Hand for horseback riding achievement and 4th Degree Tyrolean for hiking, backpacking, and outdoor expertise. A camper who demonstrates strong proficiency in all camping skills and programs may earn the Gold Spurs recognition. It honors excellence, in a number of activities, over at least three terms.

== Specialty camps ==
=== Quarter B-4 ===
In 2017, Cheley Colorado Camps began offering Quarter B-4, a five-night intro to the Cheley Experience as a "way for 7 to 10-year-olds to dip their toes into camp before jumping into 27-days". Campers are divided into two units: the Pikas for 7/8-year-olds and the Marmots for 9/10-year-olds. In 2023, Cheley announced that they were changing the minimum eligibility for Quarter B-4: Pikas to 8-years-old and that they were shortening the program by one night.

=== Family Camp ===
In 1985, Cheley started Family Camp. Family Camp at Cheley Colorado Camps invites families with children age 6 and older for five days of family time at their Trail's End Ranch for Boys property.

== Cheley/Children's Hospital Burn Camp ==
Cheley Colorado Camps expanded in 1984 to include the Cheley/Children’s Hospital Burn Camp Program. The program was started to include children healing from a burn injury and give them a camp experience. The eight-day camp is attended by burn survivors from all over the world, including from the United Kingdom and Russia. Burn Camp includes day hikes, backpacking, technical climbing, horseback riding, crafts, fishing, evening campfires, songs and games, and sports. Staff members from Cheley provide the programming and counseling while the Children’s Hospital Colorado team provides expertise in burn injuries and emotional/social issues. In addition, firefighters from Denver and Estes Park and burn nurses from multiple countries join the staff. All campers at Cheley/Children's Hospital Burn Camp attend on a scholarship basis. Burn Camp is held in August, following the completion of Cheley's summer programs.
