= Little Thompson River =

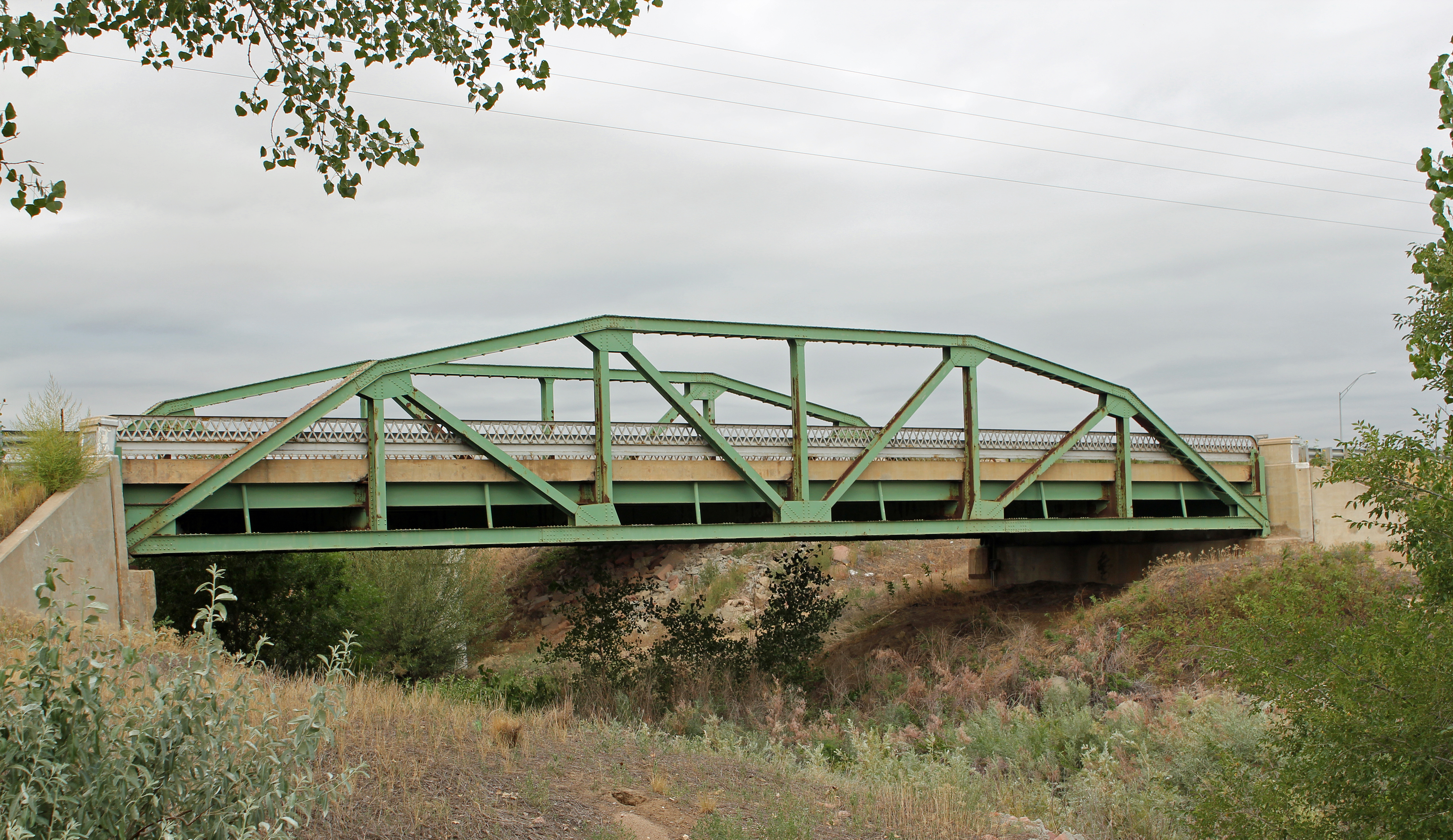
- I-25 Service Rd., Johnstown vicinity National Register 10/15/2002, 5WL.2985 "Constructed over the Little Thompson River by Gardner Brothers in 1938, the bridge is associated with the development of US Hwy. 87 north of Denver. Subsequently becoming the route for today’s I-25, the highway served as a major north-south route, joining the major population centers along the western edge of Colorado’s high plains. Designed by the Colorado Department of Highways and fabricated by Midwest Steel & Iron Works, the single span rigid connected camelback pony truss runs for 104 feet"

- Location of mouth in CO

Physical characteristics
- Source
  - coordinates: 40°21′18″N 105°27′13″W
- Mouth
  - location: Confluence with Big Thompson
  - coordinates: 40°20′26″N 104°50′37″W
  - elevation: 4,724 ft (1,440 m)

Basin features
- Progression: Big Thompson— South Platte—Platte— Missouri—Mississippi

The Little Thompson River is a tributary of the Big Thompson River and thence the South Platte River in the U.S. state of Colorado.

The river's headwaters lie in the Roosevelt National Forest. It flows east through the foothills of the Rocky Mountains in Larimer County through the town of Berthoud, Colorado, between Longmont to the south and Loveland to the north. The Little Thompson joins the Big Thompson River near that river's confluence with the South Platte River, near the town of Milliken, Colorado.

The Little Thompson runs 51.5 miles (82.9 km) from its headwaters to the confluence with the Big Thompson, and descends approximately 2,500 feet (760 m) in elevation in its approximately 24-mile (39 km) course through the mountains. Its run includes at least one 15-foot (4.6 m) waterfall and numerous granite box canyons. The river had no man-made dams as of 2007. It is managed as part of the Colorado-Big Thompson project.

The river is considered a Class IV+ waterway, marginally navigable by experienced kayakers, and then only when it is in flood stage during the rainy Spring season.

The most numerous fish species observed in the river include brook trout, mountain whitefish, rainbow trout, native Greenback cutthroat trout, and sculpin.

On May 8, 2016, two boys, Paul and Daniel Foreman, drowned in a part of the river known as 'The Tubs' near Pinewood Springs. The boys, ten and seven, respectively, were playing in the river when they were swept away.

== See also ==
- List of rivers of Colorado
