= Chipeta =

Native American leader

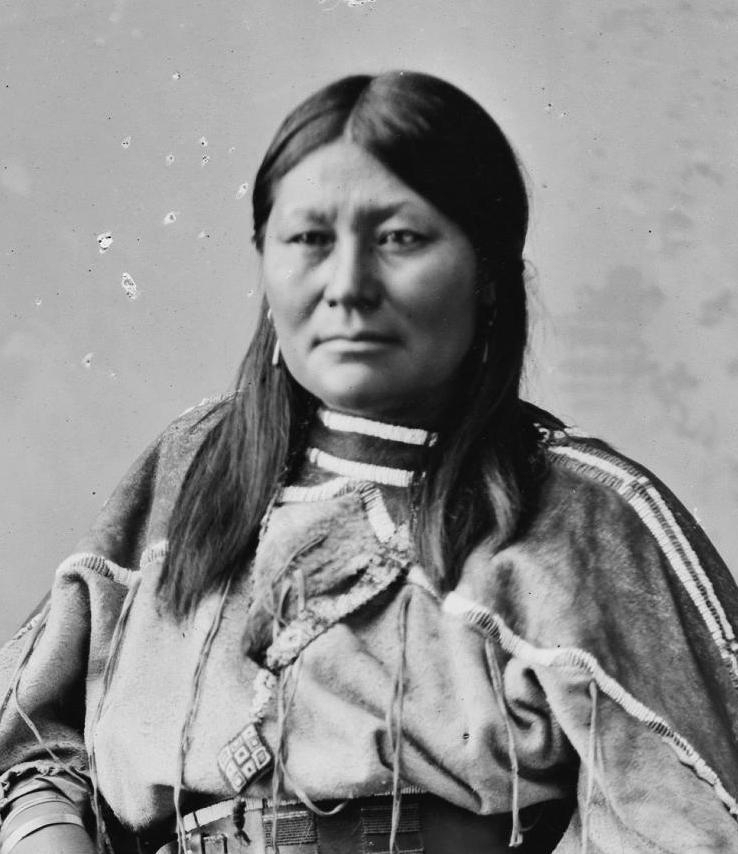
- Born: 1843 or 1844
- Died: August 9, 1924 (Note: Rockwell states that she died August 20, 1924, but a newspaper published August 15 said that she died on August 9.); Bitter Creek, Uintah and Ouray Indian Reservation, Utah
- Other name: White Singing Bird
- Citizenship: Plains Apache, United States
- Known for: Ute tribal leader and wise woman
- Spouse(s): Chief Ouray (1859–1880); Accumooquats (married by April 1, 1883) (Note: His name was stated as the derogatory Toomuchagut in the newspapers. The Denver Tribune reported on April 1, 1883,)

Chipeta or White Singing Bird (1843 or 1844 – August 9, 1924) was a Native American leader, and the second wife of Chief Ouray of the Uncompahgre Ute tribe. Born a Kiowa Apache, she was raised by the Utes in what is now Conejos, Colorado. An advisor and confidant of her husband, Chipeta continued as a leader of her people after his death in 1880.

She was an Indian rights advocate and diplomat. She used diplomacy to try to achieve peace with the white settlers in Colorado. In 1985, Chipeta was inducted into Colorado Women's Hall of Fame for her "courage and valor she demonstrated in her efforts to mediate between Native Americans and whites."

== Personal life ==
Chipeta, also known as "White Singing Bird", was born into the Kiowa Apache tribe in about 1843. She was adopted and raised by the Uncompahgre Utes in what is now Conejos, Colorado. She learned their traditional ways and became a skilled artisan in beadwork, tanning and making garments, like dresses, shirts, moccasins, and leggings from the tanned hides. Described as "dignified, well-dressed, and beautiful" in the photograph taken by Mathew Brady, Chipeta spoke Ute, Spanish and English languages, although her obituary states that she never learned English.

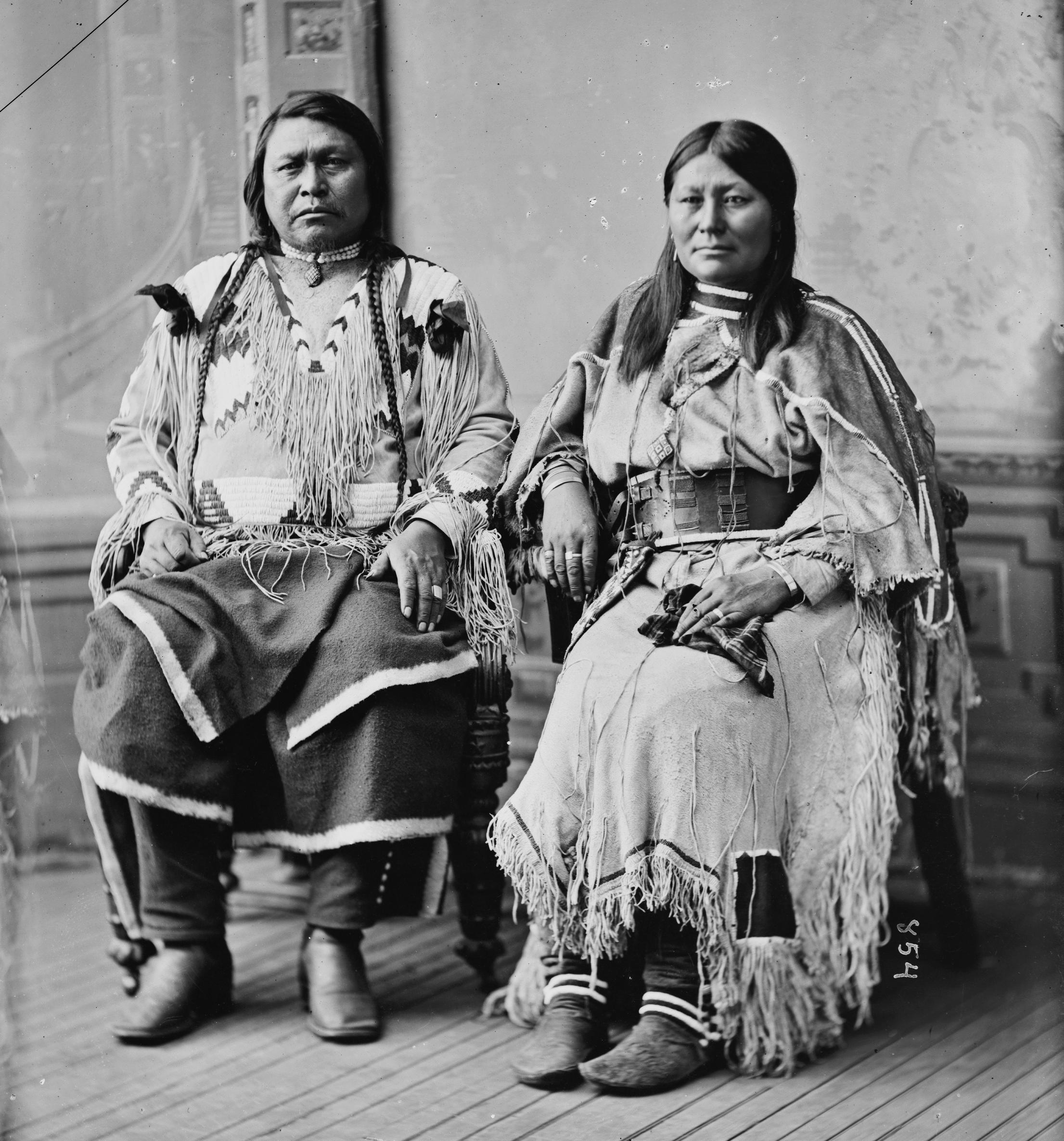
Chipeta and her husband Chief Ouray, wearing a shirt she beaded

In 1859, Chipeta married Chief Ouray of the Uncompahgres, becoming his second wife. His first wife had died and their child was kidnapped by Plains Indians. Ouray was ten years older than Chipeta, and at age 16, she was the youngest of his wives. Chipeta adopted four children and raised them as her own. She is generally thought to have never bore children, one account is that she had one son who was stolen by a band of Kiowas.

Chipeta's brother, Sapinero, was jealous of Ouray's power and tried to murder him to which he failed. Ouray took out his knife in order to kill the traitor but Chipeta grabbed it out of the sheath before Ouray could grab it, thus saving her brother's life.

Chipeta and Ouray went on annual hunting trips into the mountains together. Chief Ouray died in Ignacio, Colorado on August 24, 1880. After his death, the reservation was renamed to honor him. Chipeta continued as a leader of the Utes and was highly respected as a wise woman.

Chipeta married a White River Ute in Utah at the Ouray Agency, named Accumooquats.

== Name ==
The name Chipeta is often claimed to be a Ute name meaning "White Singing Bird", however, it is more likely a misspelling by English language speakers for the Spanish nickname Chepita, a common nickname for Josefina. One early photograph spells her name "Chepetta". Many newspapers of the era spelled her name "Chepita", consistent with the Spanish spelling. The Ute word for "white" is sagar(ü), "singing" is kaakay, and "bird" is wichich, which calls into question any suggestion that "Chipeta" is a Ute word for "White Singing Bird".

== Advisor and confidant ==
Chipeta came to act as his advisor and confidant, often sitting beside him at tribal council meetings. In 1863, Chipeta and her husband helped create the first treaty of Conejos, Colorado.

One time upon learning of a raid to be done on her white neighbors by the Utes she quickly traveled on her pony and swam the Gunnison River to warn the settlers of the raid, saving their lives. She rescued a white woman and her children from hostile Utes after a four-day ride. The family recounts: "Chief Ouray and his wife did everything to make us comfortable. We were given the whole house and found carpets on the floor, lamps on the tables and a stove with fire brightly burning. Mrs. Ouray shed tears over us." Both Chipeta and her husband were known for their kindness towards white people. They would help settlers travel through the wilderness such as showing them the direction of a ford to cross a river.

== Negotiated and forced moves ==
=== Westward expansion ===
Chipeta sought to live peacefully with the white settlers in Colorado. Tensions were rising as the settlers drove off game the Utes needed to survive. In addition, the government, through the White River Indian Agency, was pressing the Utes to take up farming, give up racing their horses, and convert to Christianity.

=== Meeker massacre ===
The Ute resentment boiled up to the White River War in September 1879, marked by the Meeker massacre at the Agency, where the Utes killed 11 white men and took three women and two children captive. In a related battle at Milk Creek, the Utes pinned down forces from Fort Steele (Wyoming) for several days before reinforcements arrived.

The Uncompahgre did not take part in the uprising. General Charles Adams, a former US Indian agent, negotiated release of the captives. One of the captives was Josephine Meeker, adult daughter of the late Indian agent Nathan Meeker. The captives were brought to Chipeta and Ouray's home after their release. Adams held an inquiry into the events in Colorado.

=== Delegate in Washington, D.C. ===
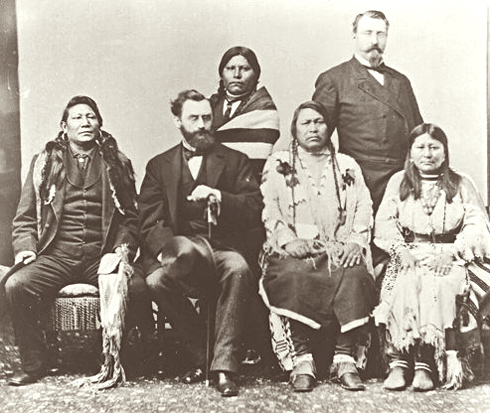
Ute delegation in Washington, D.C. in 1880. Chipeta is seated in the front row beside her husband.

Chipeta and Chief Ouray traveled with a delegation of Utes by train, bound for Washington, D.C. As Chipeta and the other Utes attempted to board a train at Alamosa, they were almost lynched by an angry mob of white people, who believed them associated with the Meeker Massacre. They passed through Chicago where they were met by crowds of people that threatened the Utes. The delegation arrived in Washington, D.C. on January 11, 1880. Arrangements had been made to entertain and protect the Ute delegation while in the capital city and to negotiate a treaty regarding reservation resettlement. They also had been asked to testify before a congressional inquiry into the Ute uprising. The Utes health suffered due to the overheated rooms and change in lifestyle in the city. The delegation became ill, Chipeta to a lesser extent than the men. Ouray became very ill and was diagnosed with Bright's disease.

On March 7, 1880, Chipeta was welcomed as a delegate by Secretary of Interior Carl Schurz at the United States Capitol. She testified before a Congressional inquiry into the Meeker Massacre. At the hearing, she took the witness stand and answered, through an interpreter, the 10 questions put to her. The Utes ratified a treaty with the US government.

Ouray died in 1880, after which "Chipeta was betrayed by the government".

=== Forced removal to Utah ===
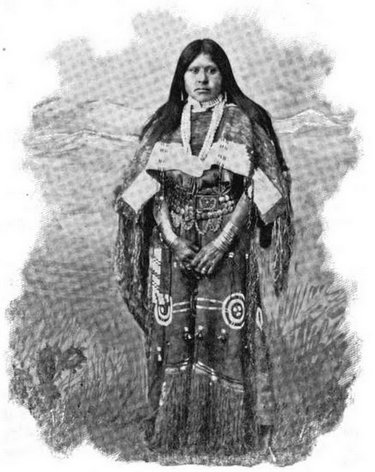
Chipeta

The Ute Removal Act of 1880 was passed which forced, White River and Uncompahgre Utes to move to the Uintah and Ouray Indian Reservation in Utah. They were forced to leave Colorado by the United States Army. Her brother Chief McCook, succeeded Ouray, and became the leader of the Federated Tribes of Utes.

The government promised Chipeta a comfortable, furnished house like the house she had with Ouray in Colorado. Instead, she was given a partially constructed two-roomed house without furniture on the White River, without irrigation to grow crops. That being the case, she returned to a traditional Ute lifestyle living in a teepe.

She was also very respected by member of the tribe and was always allowed to meetings of the council in which no other Ute woman was ever accepted. When entertaining guests, Chipeta would prepare and cook meals herself with her own utensils without any help from other women.

=== Nomadic life raising livestock ===
By 1916, Chipeta roamed southeast and south of the reservation with a small group of Utes who raised cattle and about 1,000 sheep. In the winter, they stayed at Dragon, southeast of the reservation. They moved and allowed their livestock to graze as far south of the reservation as Book Cliffs in Utah, at the Head of Bitter Creek, in the other months. Utes farmed near Bitter Creek.

Realizing that the government has neglected Chipeta since she was forced to move to Utah, Cato Sells, Indian Affairs Commissioner sent her two shawls as a sign of remembrance. (Chipeta, had received many luxurious gifts—like silk and china—in the past, but could not make use of them.) Sells received a horse blanket and a letter in thanks.

=== Later years and death ===
In her later years, she and her brother Chief McCook visited Grand Junction, Colorado nearly every year. Chipeta eventually became blind from cataracts. She lost most of her livestock in her later years. While at Bitter Creek during the warm months, family members strung a cord between her lodge and a spot where she could obtain privacy in the brush.

Chipeta was at Bitter Creek in Utah, when she died from chronic gastritis on August 9, 1924. She was buried in a shallow grave and it was feared that her grave would be washed away in a few years. In coordination with Indian agent F.A. Gross and Chipeta's brother, John McCook, her remains were reburied in a mauseleum Ouray Memorial Park (part of the Ute Indian Museum), near the site of her former home at Montrose, Colorado on March 15, 1925. A memorial service was held that day, with 5,000 people in attendance.

== See also ==
- List of Native American artists
- Visual arts of the Indigenous peoples of the Americas

== Biography ==
- Becker, Cynthia S.; Smith, P. David (2003). Chipeta : queen of the Utes, a biography. Montrose, Colorado: Western Reflections Publishing Company. ISBN 1-890437-79-4.
- Rockwell, Wilson (April 1, 1999). Sunset Slope. Western Reflections Publishing Company. ISBN 1890437255.
