= Glen Haven, Colorado =

Unincorporated community in Larimer County, CO, USA

- Unincorporated community
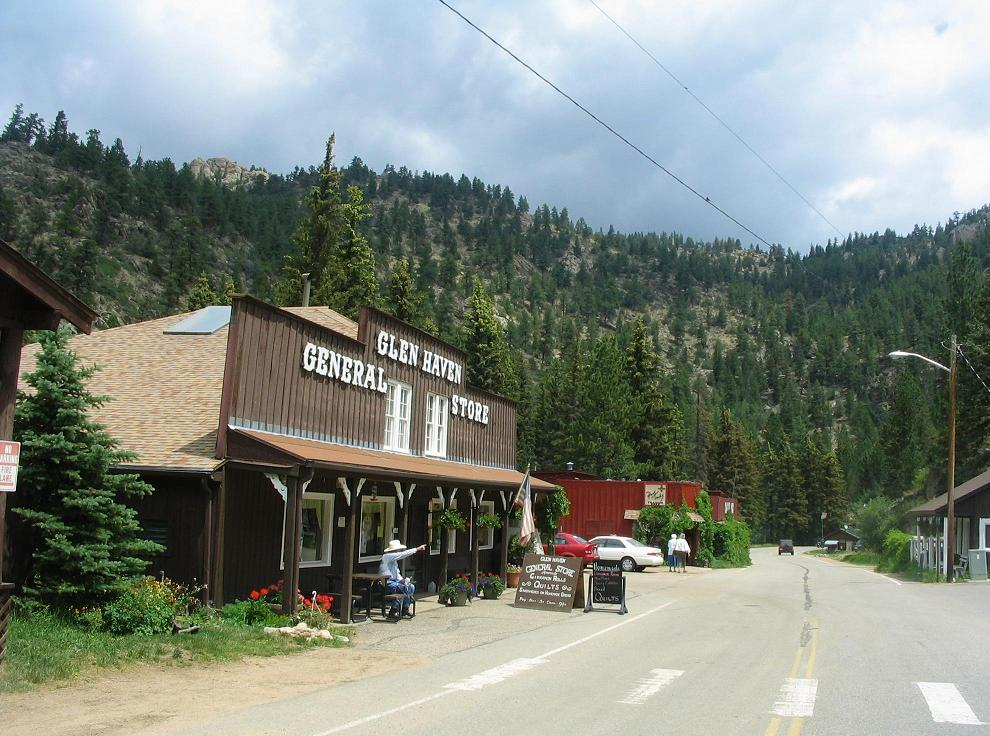
- General store on the main street of Glen Haven, Colorado.

- Location within Colorado Location within the United States
- Coordinates: 40°27′14″N 105°26′57″W
- Country: United States
- State: Colorado
- Counties: Larimer
- Elevation: 7,231 ft (2,204 m)
- Time zone: UTC-7 (MST)
  - Summer (DST): UTC-6 (MDT)
- ZIP code: 80532
- Area code: 970
- GNIS feature ID: 177630

Glen Haven is an unincorporated community and a U.S. Post Office in Larimer County, Colorado, United States. The Glen Haven Post Office has the ZIP Code 80532.

== Geography ==
Glen Haven is located in Roosevelt National Forest east of Rocky Mountain National Park. Fox Creek and West Creek join the North Fork Big Thompson River near downtown Glen Haven, which then flows through Devil's Gulch, receiving Miller Fork, and joins the Big Thompson River at Drake. Larimer County Road 43, the only road access to Glen Haven, takes a northeasterly route out of Estes Park, turning to the southeast near Glen Haven and then follows the North Fork downstream to Drake, where it terminates at US Highway 34. Many of the roads off County Road 43, called Devil's Gulch Road, are privately owned.

== History ==
In the early 1890s, the Knapp family from Illinois built a sawmill near Harding Heights, then moved it first to Miller Fork and then to the point now known as Glen Haven in 1897. The Boulder Presbytery, with assistance from the Knapp family, formed an association in 1903 and sold lots for a summer resort called Glen Haven. The association built the Glen Haven General Store in 1921. Under the direction of Ira Knapp, a lodge-style hotel was built called The Homestead, and opened in 1938. The Homestead became known as the Inn at Glen Haven and was mentioned in a Los Angeles Times travel article in 1986. The Trail's End camps of Cheley Colorado Camps are also located near Glen Haven.

Glen Haven's location in a narrow valley puts the area at risk for flooding. The Big Thompson Flood of 1976 moved the town hall several feet off its foundation. In September 2013, approximately 80 percent of Glen Haven's downtown was destroyed in the 2013 Colorado floods. Access to the town was cut off by the destruction of Larimer County Road 43 on both sides of town; the section connecting to the town of Drake and US 34 was reopened on December 6, 2013.
