= Bitter Creek (South Dakota) =

Stream in South Dakota, U.S.

Coordinates: 43°59′24″N 103°24′21″W

Bitter Creek is a stream in the U.S. state of South Dakota.

Bitter Creek most likely received its name on account of the bitter taste of the water it contains.

== See also ==
- List of rivers of South Dakota
