= Community Foundation of Northern Colorado =

NoCo Foundation
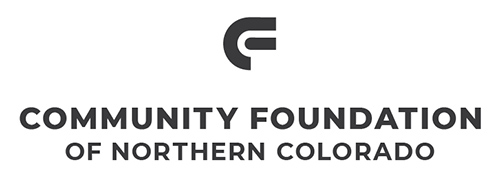
- Formation: 1975
- Location: Fort Collins, Colorado
- Region served: Northern Colorado
- Key people: Kristin Todd; President
- Website: www.nocofoundation.org

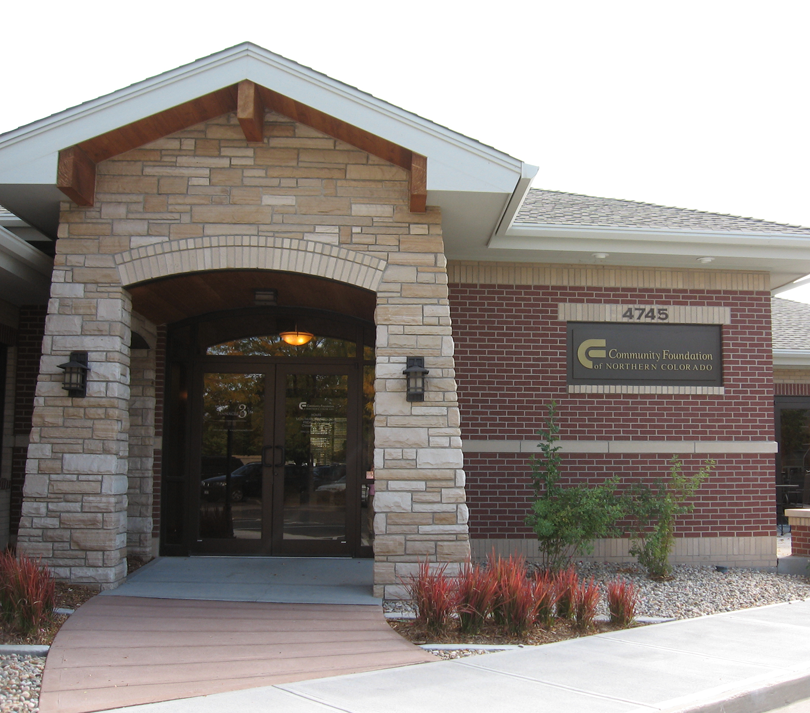
The Community Foundation of Northern Colorado built its office in southeast Fort Collins in 2005.

The Community Foundation of Northern Colorado is an independent philanthropic organization that serves the Northern Colorado community including Berthoud, Estes Park, Fort Collins, and Loveland.

== Purpose ==
Like other community foundations, this a permanent nonprofit organization working in a specific geographic area to manage a collection of charitable funds. Donations to the funds are tax-deductible and grants from the funds are distributed to nonprofits, schools, and churches. A Community Foundation operates by charging a modest annual fee on the funds it manages.

== About ==
The Community Foundation's work to strengthen and sustain Northern Colorado keeps them connected with and accountable to Northern Colorado residents—past, present, and future. Every resident of Northern Colorado benefits from the legacy and strategic planning of previous generations.

Hundreds of individuals, families, businesses, and nonprofit organizations have established funds at the Community Foundation of Northern Colorado. They entrust their resources—in the form of cash, real estate, stock, estate gifts, and more—to the Community Foundation and depend on it to be the long-term steward of these assets.

== History ==
In the fall of 1975, Fort Collins, Colorado] was a small college town of approximately 60,000 people on the verge of major growth., and there was a need for a nonprofit organization to collect charitable contributions for local purposes. Initially, the foundation was called the Fort Collins Community Foundation before expanding to serve a greater Northern Colorado region. The Community Foundation of Northern Colorado grants out millions of dollars each year and has grown to more than $70 million in assets.

== Community Foundation of Northern Colorado initiatives, funds, and projects ==
Community leaders and donors have used the foundation as a platform to launch and fund new initiatives such as UniverCity Connections, Homeward 2020, FortZED, Veterans Plaza of Northern Colorado, and the Rialto Bridge Project. Memorial funds, large and small, have been established to carry on the memory of loved ones. The Foundation serves as the infrastructure for community projects such as Inspiration Playground and as the platform for launching new nonprofits like Project Smile and CHAMP.
