= Bitter Creek (Utah) =

Coordinates: 39°58′13″N 109°24′43″W

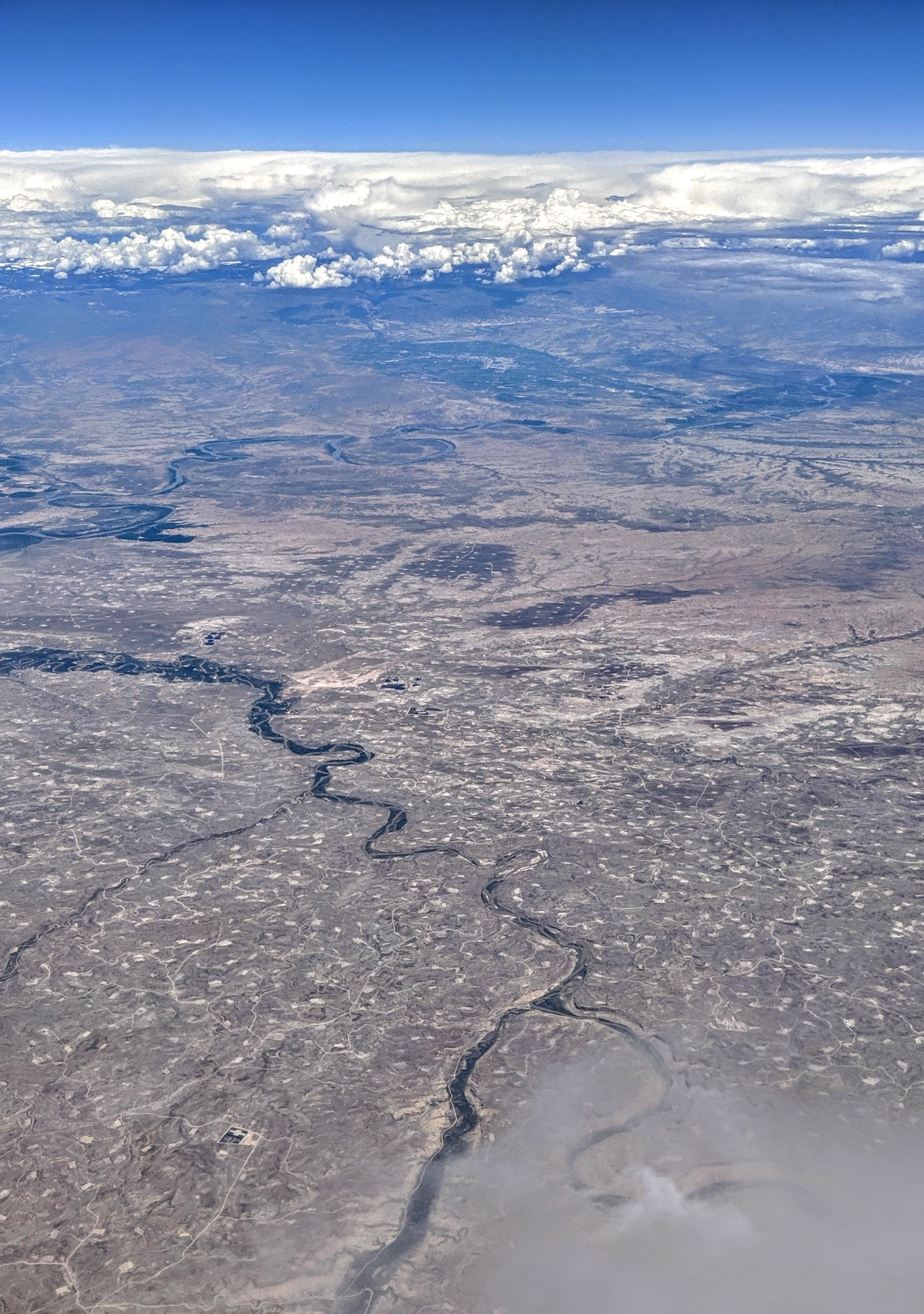
Bitter Creek (lower center/left) at its confluence with the White River, surrounded by the Bitter Creek gas field. The Green River's Horseshoe Bend and Vernal, Utah, are visible in the distance.

Bitter Creek is a tributary of the White River in Utah.
