= Disaster Relief Appropriations Act, 2013 =

United States law

- Long title: Making supplemental appropriations for the fiscal year ending September 30, 2013, and for other purposes.
- Announced in: the 113th United States Congress
- Sponsored by: Rep. Harold Rogers (R, KY-5)
- Number of co-sponsors: 0

Codification
- Acts affected: Balanced Budget and Emergency Deficit Control Act of 1985, Robert T. Stafford Disaster Relief and Emergency Assistance Act, Head Start Act, Housing and Community Development Act of 1974, Emergency Food Assistance Act of 1983, and others
- U.S.C. sections affected: 7 U.S.C. § 2036, 7 U.S.C. § 7508, 42 U.S.C. § 5121 et seq., 42 U.S.C. § 5301 et seq., and others
- Agencies affected: Food and Nutrition Service, United States Department of Agriculture, United States Department of the Army, United States Army Corps of Engineers, Small Business Administration, United States Coast Guard, Department of Homeland Security Office of Inspector General, Federal Emergency Management Agency, Executive Office of the President, Department of Health and Human Services, Substance Abuse and Mental Health Services Administration, National Institutes of Health, Social Security Administration, National Guard Bureau, United States Department of Veterans Affairs, United States Department of Transportation, Federal Transit Administration, Department of Housing and Urban Development, Office of Management and Budget, Government Accountability Office
- Appropriations: $7,485,694,000

Legislative history
- Introduced in the House as H.R. 152 by Hal Rogers (R–KY) on January 4, 2013; Committee consideration by Committee on Appropriations, Committee on the Budget; Passed the House on January 15, 2013 (Roll Call Vote 23: 241-180); Passed the Senate on January 28, 2013 (Recorded Vote 4: 62-36); Signed into law by President Barack Obama on January 29, 2013

Public Law 113-2 (Pub. L. 113–2 (text) (PDF), H.R. 152, 127 Stat. 4, enacted January 29, 2013), containing Division A: Disaster Relief Appropriations Act, 2013 and Division B: Sandy Recovery Improvement Act of 2013 is a U.S. appropriations bill authorizing $60 billion for disaster relief agencies. The Budget Control Act of 2011 (BCA), had authorized only disaster spending and emergency spending to exceed established spending caps. While emergency spending is not subject to the caps in the BCA, spending for disaster relief is calculated by taking the average of the previous ten years disaster relief spending, excluding the highest and lowest spending years.

== Aid Assistance for Hurricane Sandy ==
On December 28, 2012, the Senate amended H.R. 1, a $61 billion aid package for the victims and communities affected by Hurricane Sandy. The bill passed by a vote of 62-32, Recorded vote 248.

On January 4, 2013, the House passed H.R. 41 (345-67, Roll Call # 7). The Act provided for an increase in borrowing authority for National Flood Insurance Program (NFIP) of $9.7 billion. The bill subsequently passed the Senate by voice vote.

The amendment in the nature of a substitute offered to H.R. 152 provides $17 billion in emergency funding in addition to the $9.7 billion already authorized for the NFIP. Total funding, including the increased borrowing authority, the Rogers's AINS, and the Frelinghuysen amendment to the AINS is approximately $60.4 billion.

The AINS to H.R. 152 provides for $17 billion in immediate support to the victims and communities impacted by Hurricane Sandy. A breakdown for the funding for is as follows:

Agency	Appropriation
Federal Emergency Management Agency (FEMA) Disaster Relief Fund (DRF)	$5.4 billion
Department of Transportation, Federal Transit Authority Emergency Relief	$5.4 billion
Department of Housing and Urban Development (HUD)	$3.9 billion
Army Corps of Engineers	$1.35 billion
Department of the Interior	$287 million
Department of Health and Human Services	$100 million
Department of Veterans Affairs	$235 million
Small Business Administration	$161 million
National Guard	$24.2 million
Department of Agriculture	$6 million
Amtrak	$32 million
Federal Aviation Administration	$14.6 million
Agriculture	$218 million
Commerce, Justice, Science	$513.25 million
Department of Defense	$88.335 million
Energy and Water	$3.997 billion
Financial Services	$651 million
Homeland Security	$6.544 billion
Interior and Environment	$1.166 billion
Labor, Health and Human Services, and Education	$725 million
Transportation, Housing and Urban Development	$19.773 billion

=== Federal Emergency Management Agency (FEMA) Disaster Relief Fund (DRF) ===
This funding will fulfill near-term needs for the DRF, the most immediate source of relief and recovery funds available to individuals, families, and communities to support ongoing recovery through affected areas. This includes providing individual assistance such as temporary housing, crisis counseling, and disaster unemployment assistance. It also provides funding for public assistance to local communities and certain nonprofits for debris removal, emergency protective measures, and repair, replacement, and restoration of disaster-damaged, publicly owned facilities and the facilities of certain nonprofit organizations.

=== Department of Transportation, Federal Transit Authority Emergency Relief ===
This funding will provide reasonable assistance and recovery to the four major affected transit agencies – New York's MTA, the Port Authority of NY/NJ, New Jersey Transit, and the City of New York DOT Ferries. Language is included in the legislation to provide stringent oversight on the use of funding and the administration of grants.

=== Department of Housing and Urban Development (HUD) ===
This funding through HUD's Community Development Fund will support critical and immediate community needs. This includes repairs to damage sustained by publicly owned hospitals, local roads and utilities, and small businesses.

=== Army Corps of Engineers ===
The bill fully funds the Administration's updated estimates for Army Corps of Engineers projects for response and recovery to Hurricane Sandy. As was done after previous disasters, these funds will help restore navigation channels, beaches, and other damaged infrastructure to pre-storm conditions. In addition, the bill will provide funds to continue response and recovery activities for flood control, coastal emergency projects, and emergency dredging. The legislation also directs the Corps to submit plans for reducing the threats of future flooding to ensure future funding is responsibly and effectively utilized.

=== Department of the Interior ===
This funding will help repair national parks, lands and facilities under the jurisdiction of the Department of the Interior that sustained damage during Hurricane Sandy. This includes funding for immediate repair and recovery needs for national wildlife refuges and national fish hatcheries along the East Coast, and National Parks, including the Statue of Liberty and Ellis Island.

=== Department of Health and Human Services ===
The bill provides $100 million in funding for the Public Health and Social Services Emergency Fund for disaster response and recovery efforts directly related to Hurricane Sandy. This includes funding for the Social Services Block Grant program for repairs to social services facilities, repairs to Head Start centers, replacement of equipment and resource losses within National Institute of Health.

=== Department of Veterans Affairs ===
This funding will go to repairs and reconstruction at the Manhattan VA hospital and other VA medical facilities, which sustained significant flood damage during the storm. These repairs are urgently needed to provide adequate medical services and care to veterans in the Northeast region, many of whom have had to move to other VA facilities following the storm.

=== Small Business Administration ===
This funding will provide for the immediate needs of the SBA Disaster Loan Program to provide timely, low-interest financing for the repair and rebuilding of disaster-damaged private property for homeowners, renters, and businesses. This funding would also provide grants to assist small businesses affected by Hurricane Sandy with disaster recovery and response problems.

=== National Guard ===
This funding will provide for repairs of a variety of Army National Guard buildings and structures damaged by Hurricane Sandy.

=== Department of Agriculture ===
This will support replenishing stocks at food banks and soup kitchens in the areas affected by Hurricane Sandy, via the Commodity Assistance Program through the Food and Nutrition Service.

=== Amtrak ===
This will provide funding to repair Amtrak infrastructure that sustained hurricane damage. The bill does not fund Administration-requested offsets for operating revenue losses or for construction of a long-planned Hudson River tunnel.

=== Federal Aviation Administration ===
This will provided funding to repair or replace equipment and facilities damaged by Sandy. These include navigation systems, control towers, and power systems.

The Amendment to the AINS offered by Energy and Water Subcommittee Chairman Frelinghuysen adds an additional $33.7 billion in the following areas to cover current and anticipated needs:

=== Agriculture ===
This funding will go to emergency conservation and restoration efforts, as well as flood prevention and watershed repairs.

=== Commerce, Justice, Science ===
A large portion of this funding will go to the National Oceanic and Atmospheric Administration to improve severe weather forecasts and warnings, to assess the impacts of Hurricane Sandy on coastal communities, and to support local recovery efforts. Other funding will help agencies and departments replace and repair property and equipment damaged during the storm.

=== Department of Defense ===
Hurricane Sandy inflicted damage to various bases, arsenals, ammunition plants, and other installations along the East Coast. This funding will support repairs to and clean-up for various military equipment and facilities affected.

=== Energy and Water ===
The amendment addresses additional needs to help the Army Corps of Engineers respond to damage incurred during Hurricane Sandy. As was done with previous disasters, these funds will help restore beaches, navigation channels, and other damaged infrastructure to pre-storm conditions, and assist with dredging and sustainability, as well as repairs and authorized improvements to flood control efforts in the affected areas.

=== Financial Services ===
The amendment will provide further funding for the SBA, Disaster Loan Program to provide low interest financing for the repair and rebuilding of disaster-damaged private property for homeowners, renters, and businesses. It will also provide additional grants to assist small businesses affected by the storm, and provide $7 million for repairs to various federal buildings damaged by the storm.

=== Homeland Security ===
In this amendment, FEMA's Disaster Relief Fund will receive additional funding for disaster recovery and relief efforts, including individual and public assistance. In addition, the funding will restore funding for operational losses to DHS agencies like Customs and Border Protection, Immigration and Customs Enforcement, and the Coast Guard.

=== Interior and Environment ===
The amendment provides funding to address storm-damage repairs to Department of the Interior buildings and facilities, including national parks, national wildlife refuges, fish hatcheries, and other sites. Funding will also be used for wetland restoration. In addition, the amendment provides funding for EPA state grants for water and wastewater treatment infrastructure and environmental mediation.

=== Labor, Health and Human Services, and Education ===
This funding will go to help provide health services, including mental health treatment, education and training either directly or through dislocated worker emergency grants, case management, domestic violence services, and child welfare/youth services in the wake of the storm. In addition, the funding will support the reconstruction and repair of health and childcare facilities, damaged Head Start facilities, and damaged Social Security Administration buildings and equipment.

=== Transportation, Housing and Urban Development ===
The amendment provides funding for repairs to Sandy-related damage to roads, bridges and tunnels through the Federal Highway Administration's Emergency Relief Program as well as the repair backlog for previous disasters. It also provides supplementary funding for repairs, replacement, and reconstruction for various transportation infrastructure: Federal Aviation Administration facilities and equipment; Amtrak rails and equipment; and affected public transportation infrastructure in the New York City metropolitan area (including the MetropolMetropolitan Transportation Authority, the Port Authority of New York/New Jersey, New Jersey Transit, and ferries operated by the New York City Department of Transportation). To support community and housing needs for Sandy and other 2011–2013 eligible disasters, the amendment also provides added funding for the Community Development Block Grant program to assist state and local governments meet needs for public infrastructure like hospitals, utilities and roads, repairs for small businesses, rental assistance, and other community development projects. Cost

CBO score for H.R. 152: $16.88 billion/10 years

CBO score for the Frelinghuysen amendment: $33.67 billion/10 years

== See also ==
- Humanitarian aid
