= Big Thompson River =

River in US state of Colorado

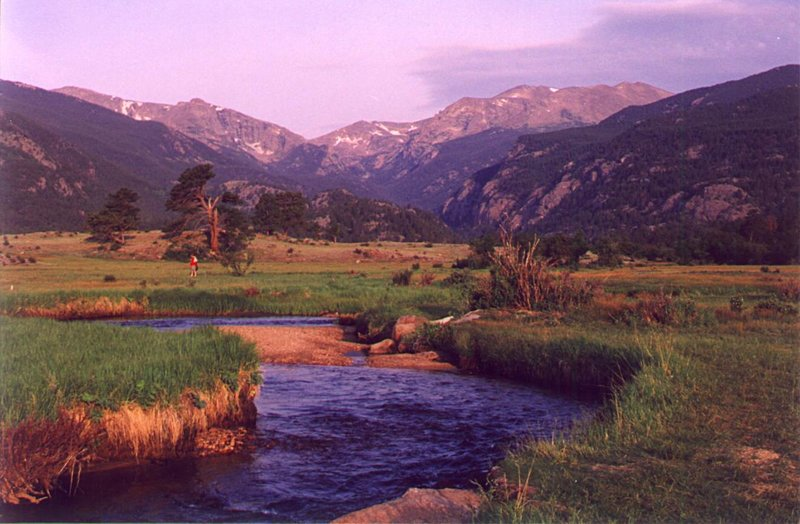
- The headwaters of the Big Thompson River are in Rocky Mountain National Park.

- Location of mouth

Location
- Country: United States
- State: Colorado
- City: Grand Lake

Physical characteristics
- Source: Rocky Mountains
  - coordinates: 40°25′41″N 105°47′29″W
  - elevation: 11,310 ft (3,450 m)
- Mouth: South Platte River
  - location: Near Greeley
  - coordinates: 40°21′16″N 104°45′37″W
  - elevation: 4,670 ft (1,420 m)
- Length: 78 mi (126 km)
- Discharge
  - location: Loveland
  - average: 72.5 cu ft/s (2.05 m^{3}/s)
  - minimum: 0.48 cu ft/s (0.014 m^{3}/s)
  - maximum: 35,000 cu ft/s (990 m^{3}/s)

Basin features
- Tributaries
  - left: North Fork Big Thompson River
  - right: Little Thompson River

The Big Thompson River is a tributary of the South Platte River, approximately 78 miles (126 km) long, in the U.S. state of Colorado. Originating in Forest Canyon in Rocky Mountain National Park, the river flows into Lake Estes in the town of Estes Park and then through Big Thompson Canyon. It includes four crossings/bridges which are listed on the U.S. National Register of Historic Places.

== Course of the river ==
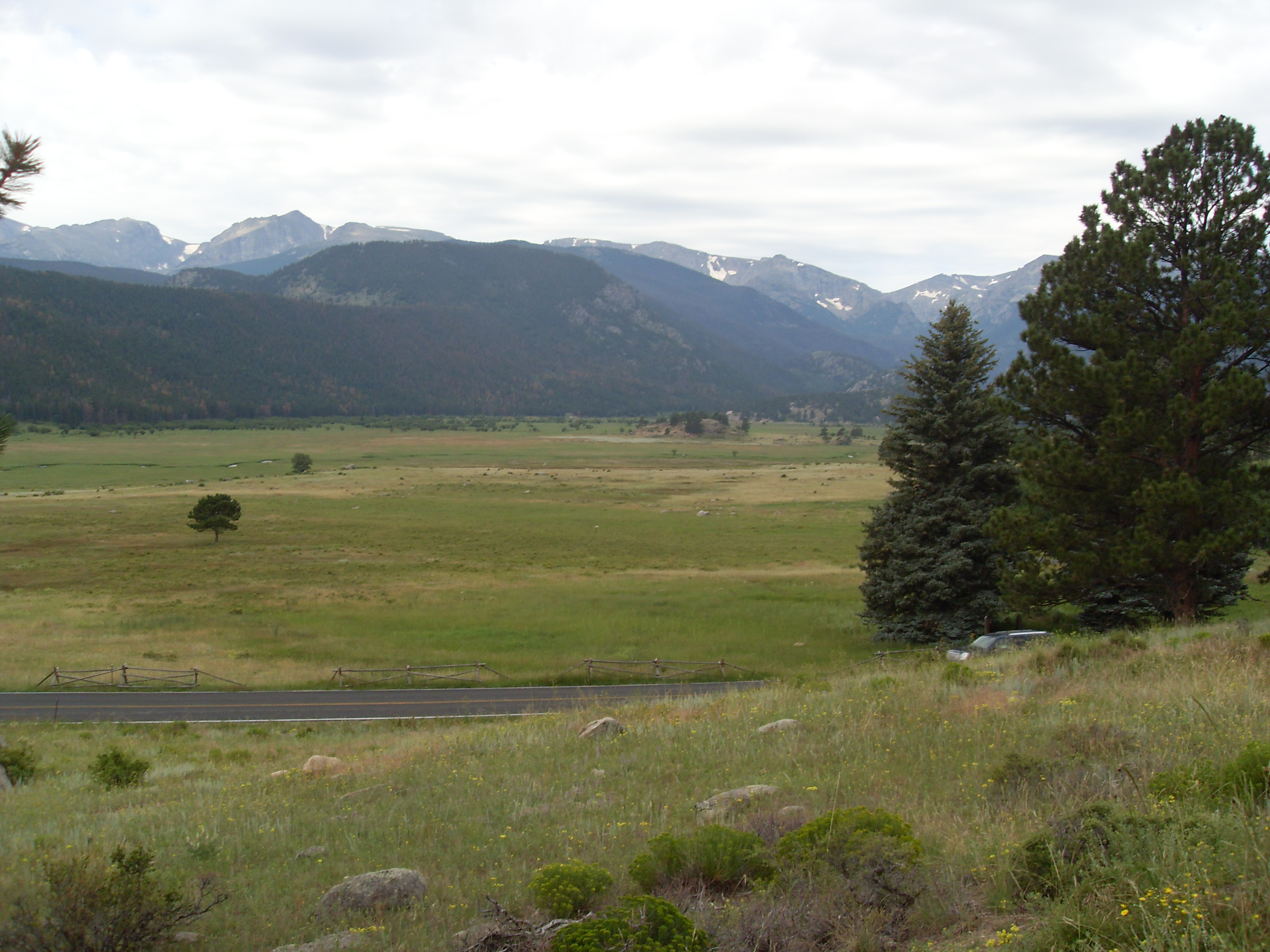
Big Thompson River in Moraine Park in the Rocky Mountain National Park

The headwaters of the Big Thompson River begin in Forest Canyon within Rocky Mountain National Park in Larimer County, Colorado. The river flows east through Moraine Park to the town of Estes Park. There it is held in Lake Estes by Olympus Dam before being released into the Big Thompson Canyon. The North Fork Big Thompson River also begins in Rocky Mountain National Park, on the northern slopes of the Mummy Range. This tributary flows east, through the town of Glen Haven, where it merges with the Big Thompson River in the town of Drake, in the Big Thompson Canyon.

From Lake Estes, the river descends 1/2 mile (800 m) in elevation through the mountains in the spectacular 25-mile (40 km) Big Thompson Canyon, emerging from the foothills west of Loveland. It flows eastward, south of Loveland across the plains into Weld County and joins the South Platte approximately 5 mi (8.0 km) south of Greeley. It receives the Little Thompson River approximately four miles (6.4 km) upstream from its mouth.

Water resources in the Big Thompson River are managed by the Northern Colorado Water Conservancy District as part of the Colorado-Big Thompson Project.

== 1976 flood ==
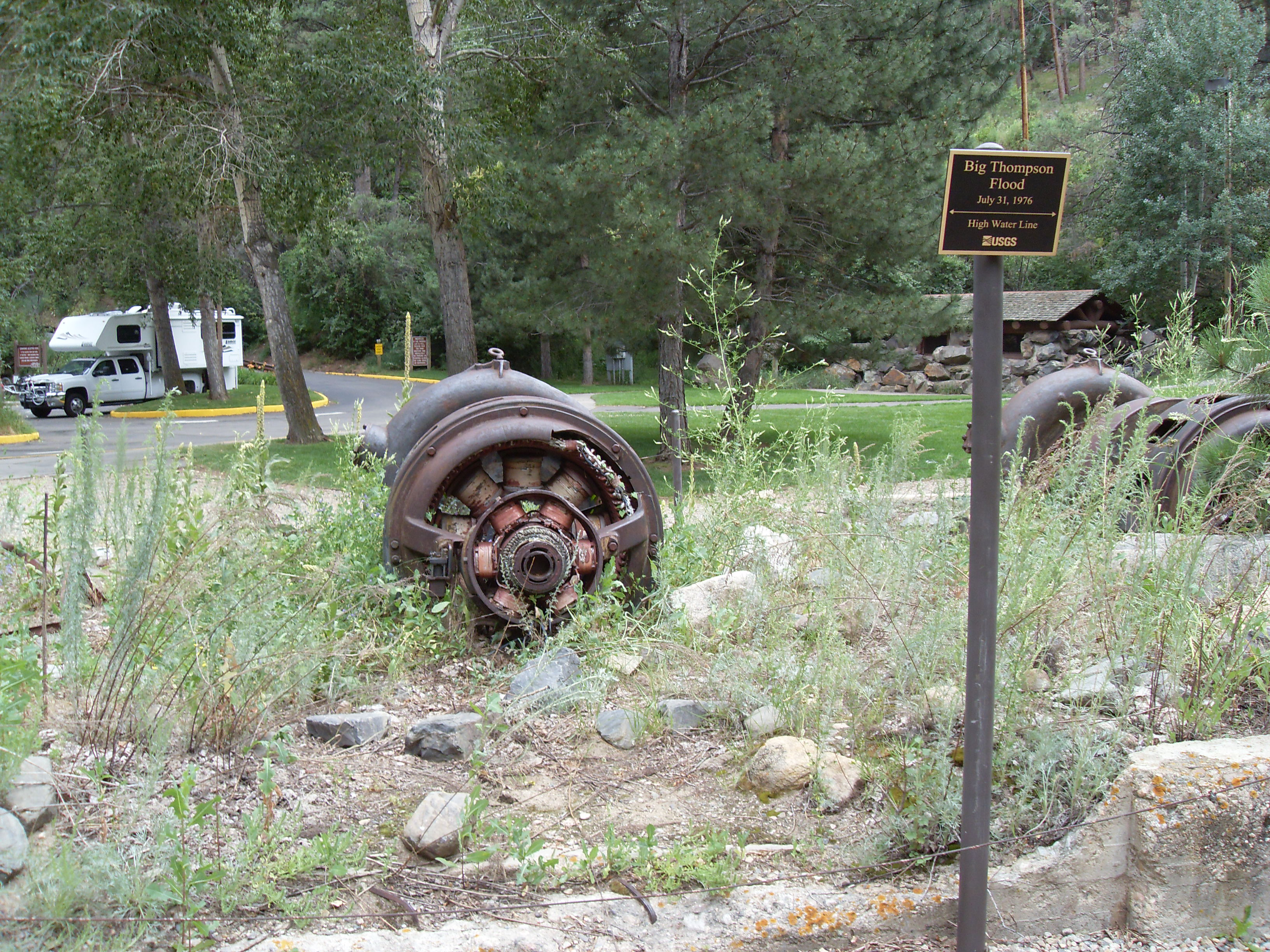
Sign in the Viestenz-Smith Park, demonstrating the maximum height of the flood

On July 31, 1976, during the celebration of Colorado's centennial, the Big Thompson Canyon was the site of a devastating flash flood that swept down the steep and narrow canyon, claiming the lives of 143 people, 5 of whom were never found, making it the deadliest disaster in Colorado's history. This flood was triggered by a nearly stationary thunderstorm near the upper section of the canyon that dumped 12 inches (300 millimeters) of rain in less than 4 hours (more than 3/4 of the average annual rainfall for the area). Little rain fell over the lower section of the canyon, where many of the victims were.

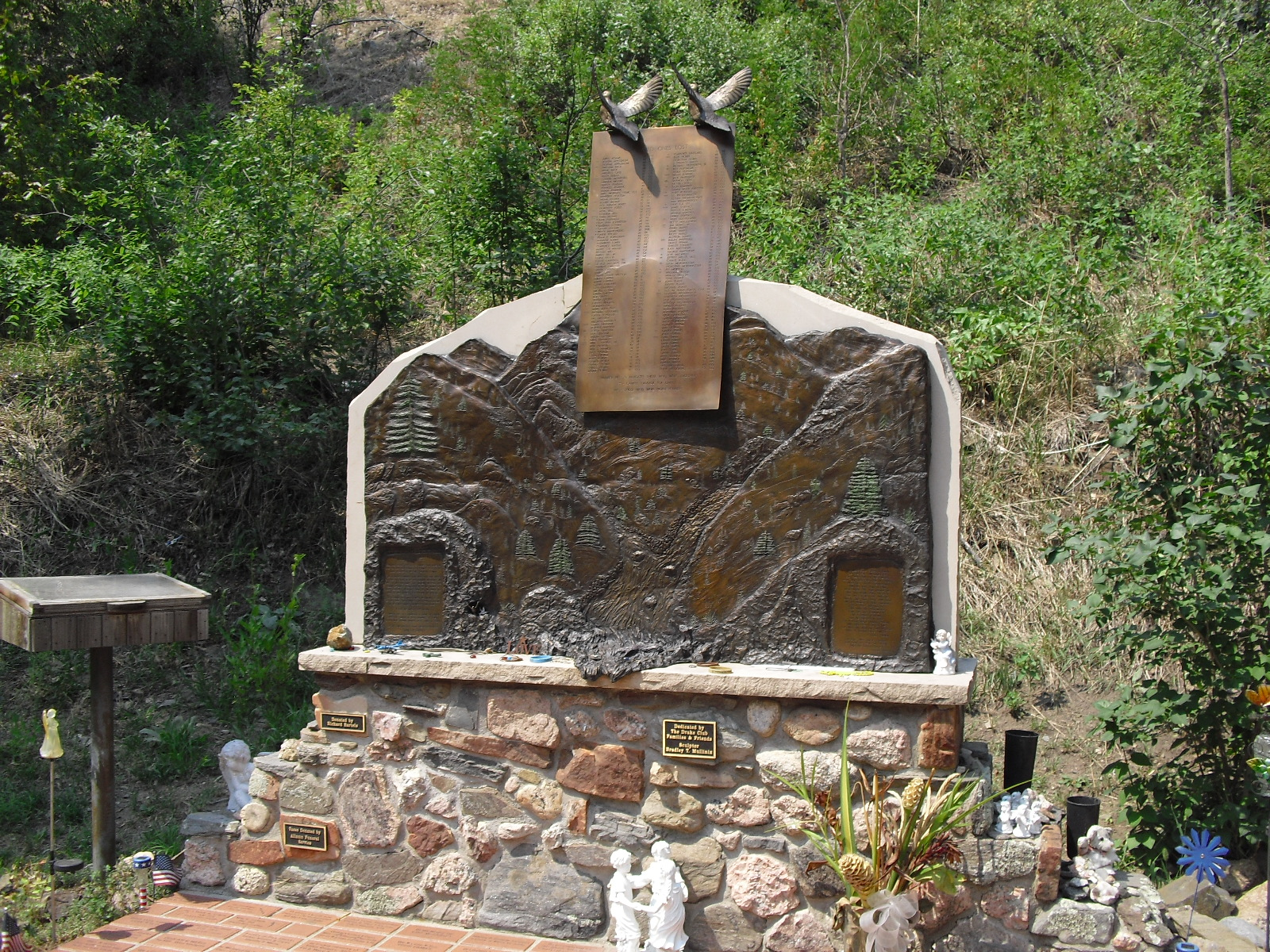
Memorial to the lives lost in the 1976 Big Thompson Flood located in the town of Drake.

Around 9 p.m., a wall of water more than 20 feet (6.1 meters) high raced down the canyon at about 13 miles per hour (5.8 m/s), destroying 400 cars, 418 houses and 52 businesses and washing out most of U.S. Route 34. This flood was more than 4 times as strong as any in the 112-year record available in 1976, with a discharge of 35,000 cubic feet per second (1000 m³/s).

In 2008, a man who was thought to have died in the flood was found to be alive and living in Oklahoma. Darrell Johnson and his family had rented a cabin east of Estes Park, but left without telling anyone on the morning of July 31. A woman who was researching the flood's victims discovered he was still alive.

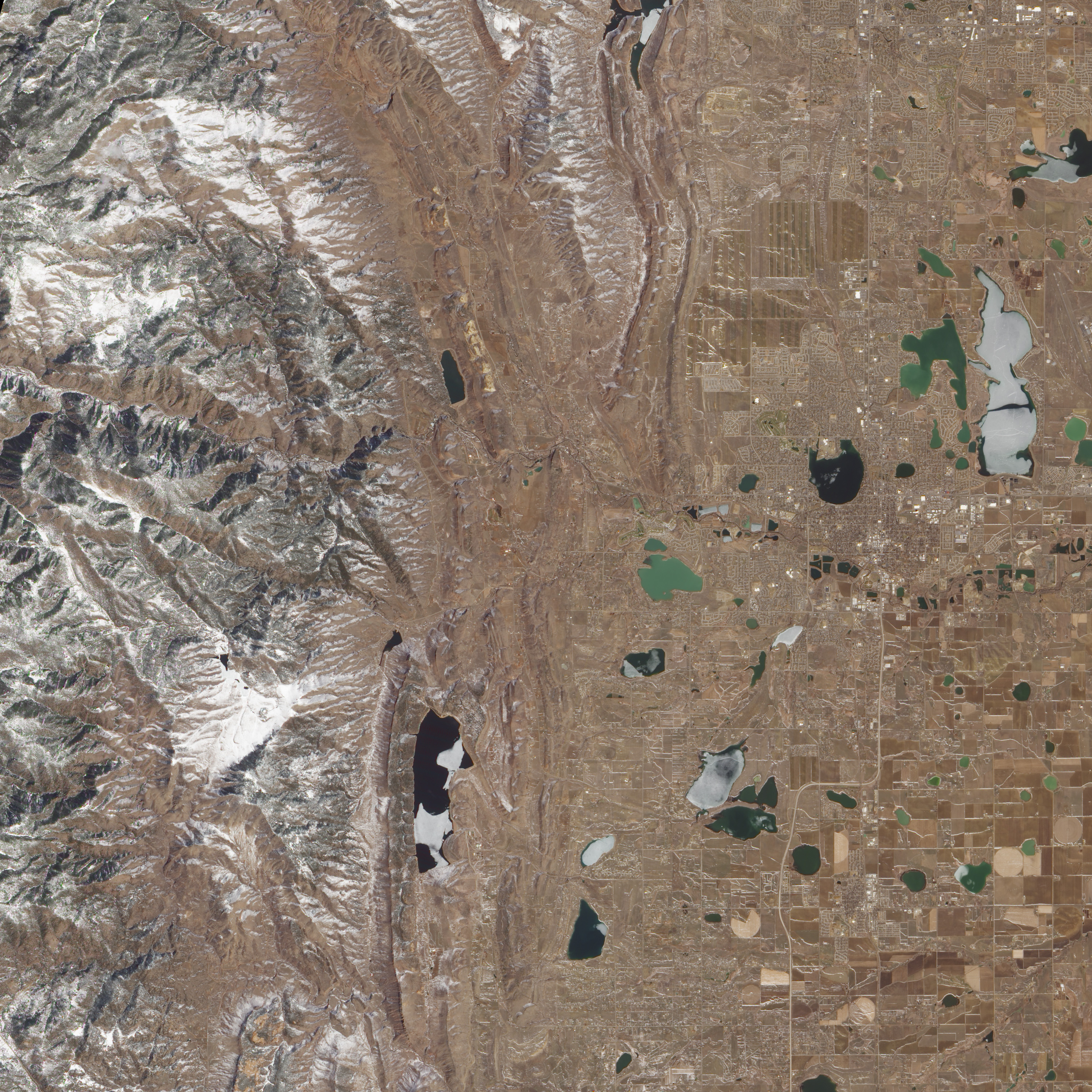
This natural-colour image of the lower reaches of Big Thompson Canyon illustrates two of the three natural factors that contributed to the flood's severity: steep terrain and sparse vegetation

== 2013 flood ==
The canyon was just one of the many areas along the Front Range that were devastated in the September 2013 flood. While not as intense as the 1976 flood, the storms that caused the flooding in 2013 still sent enough water down the canyon to wash out the highway in many places. The flood also damaged the US Bureau of Reclamation's Dille Diversion Dam. The biggest infrastructure casualty, however, was the City of Loveland's hydroelectric plant (rebuilt after the 1976 flood); the Idylwilde Reservoir was completely filled with silt and rocks, the Idylwilde Dam broke free of the bedrock, and the hydroelectric plant in the Viestenz-Smith Mountain Park was filled with water and silt. The dam was in the process of being relicensed with the FERC, but it was instead demolished, the dam material and contents of the reservoir being used as fill for highway repairs. The park has since been redone to accommodate the post-flood river channel and to harden it against potential future floods. The city also rebuilt its municipal electric distribution line into the canyon to replace the original 1925 transmission line and remove obsolete distribution equipment.

== See also ==
- Big Thompson River Bridges, four crossings that were listed on the National Register of Historic Places
- List of Colorado rivers
