= Drake, Colorado =

Unincorporated community in Larimer County, Colorado, United States

- unincorporated community
- Location of Drake, Colorado. Drake (Colorado)
- Coordinates: 40°25′55″N 105°20′25″W
- Country: United States
- State: Colorado
- County: Larimer

Government
  - Type: unincorporated community
  - Body: Larimer County
- Elevation: 6,162 ft (1,878 m)

Population (2010)
  - Total: 1,010
- Time zone: UTC−07:00 (MST)
  - Summer (DST): UTC−06:00 (MDT)
- ZIP code: 80515
- Area codes: 970/748
- GNIS place ID: 2413096

Drake is an unincorporated community and post office located in and governed Larimer County, Colorado, United States. The community is located along U.S. Highway 34 in Big Thompson Canyon between Estes Park and Loveland near Rocky Mountain National Park. The 2010 ZIP Code population of Drake was 1,010.

== History ==
The Drake, Colorado, post office opened on December 14, 1905.

== See also ==
- Fort Collins-Loveland, CO Metropolitan Statistical Area
- Front Range Urban Corridor
