= Freelan Oscar Stanley =

American inventor (1849–1940)

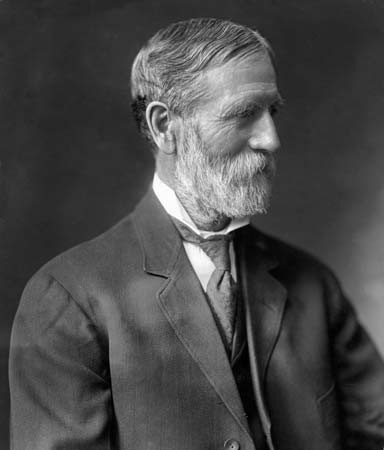
- Stanley c. 1910.
- Born: June 1, 1849; Kingfield, Maine, US
- Died: October 2, 1940 (aged 91); Newton, Massachusetts, US
- Resting place: Riverside Cemetery; Kingfield, Maine, US
- Education: Western State Normal School; Hebron Academy; Bowdoin College
- Known for: Stanley Steamer, The Stanley Hotel, Rocky Mountain National Park
- Board member of: Hebron Academy, 1911-40 (president, 1915-40); Maine State Sanatorium Association, 1913
- Spouse: Flora Jane Record Tileston
- Relatives: Francis Edgar Stanley (twin brother); Chansonetta Stanley Emmons (sister)

Freelan Oscar Stanley (June 1, 1849 – October 2, 1940) was an American inventor, entrepreneur, hotelier, and architect. He made his fortune in the manufacture of photographic plates but is best remembered as the co-founder, with his brother Francis Edgar Stanley, of the Stanley Motor Carriage Company which built steam-powered automobiles until 1920. He also built and operated the Stanley Hotel in Estes Park, Colorado.

== Early life ==
Freelan Oscar Stanley and his twin Francis Edgar (1849-1918) were born on June 1, 1849, in Kingfield, Maine. They were the grandsons of Liberty Stanley, whose wife, Hannah Metcalf Fairbanks, died following the birth of their seventh child. Unable to handle the burden by himself, Liberty arranged for several of the children to be adopted. The son named after him was adopted and renamed Solomon Liberty Stanley by his brother, Solomon Stanley. The seven children of Solomon Liberty Stanley and his wife Apphia French who reached adulthood included Freelan and Francis.

Although the Stanley family was not wealthy, education was highly valued and knowledge of science, poetry, and music was encouraged from a young age. The eldest son, Isaac Newton Stanley, was named for Solomon Liberty Stanley's older brother, who had been named after the English scientist. Two of their sons, John Calvin Stanley (named for the Protestant reformer) and Ulysses Grant Stanley, died in infancy. Their one daughter, Chansonetta Stanley Emmons, achieved significant recognition as a photographer. It has been suggested that the names Francis Edgar and Freelan Oscar were drawn from the pages of Sir Walter Scott although Edgar appears to be the only one of their names shared with a character from his works. Scott's Marmion had special significance for the Stanley brothers, uniting their love of poetry and the arts with pride in their Scottish ancestry. "On, Stanley, on!" a battle cry quoted in this poem became the motto of the Stanley Dry Plate Company featured on their packaging (albeit with an error in punctuation) above the logo of a knight on horseback.

At age nine, Freelan and Francis started their first business together, refining and selling maple sugar. They used their hard-earned money to purchase wool cloth for school suits and Benjamin Greenleaf's National Arithmetic a book of equations that they completed. When they reached age eleven, their great-uncle, Liberty Stanley, who had raised their father as his own son, taught them the art of violin making. By age sixteen, Freelan had completed three instruments. He continued to make them throughout his life, creating many concert-quality pieces still prized today by collectors and musicians. In 1863, in the midst of the American Civil War, the brothers were witness to the Kingfield Rebellion, a protest against the highly unpopular Enrollment Act and the only anti-Union rebellion to occur in the State of Maine.

At age 20, the brothers began their collegiate education at Western State Normal School (now University of Maine, Farmington) with the intention of becoming educators. Francis soon found that academic schooling was not to his liking and left to pursue a career as a portrait artist. Freelan continued his education at Hebron Academy from 1871 to 1873 and Bowdoin College in Brunswick from 1873 to 1874. He was in the same class as Arctic explorer Admiral Robert Peary and present during the so-called Drill Rebellion, in which Bowdoin pupils refused to participate in the daily military drills mandated by the college president, Joshua Chamberlain.

After Bowdoin, Stanley became headmaster of the high school in Mechanic Falls, Maine. There he met Flora Jane Record Tileston (1847-1939), a teacher and pianist of some competency whom he married in 1876. In 1881, Freelan was struck with tuberculosis and his 27-year-old brother Solomon Liberty died of the disease. Believing that his survival depended on a less sedentary life, he turned to manufacturing, opening the Stanley Practical Drawing Set factory. However, this business and his investment in it were destroyed by a fire a year later, in 1882.

== Stanley Dry Plate Company ==
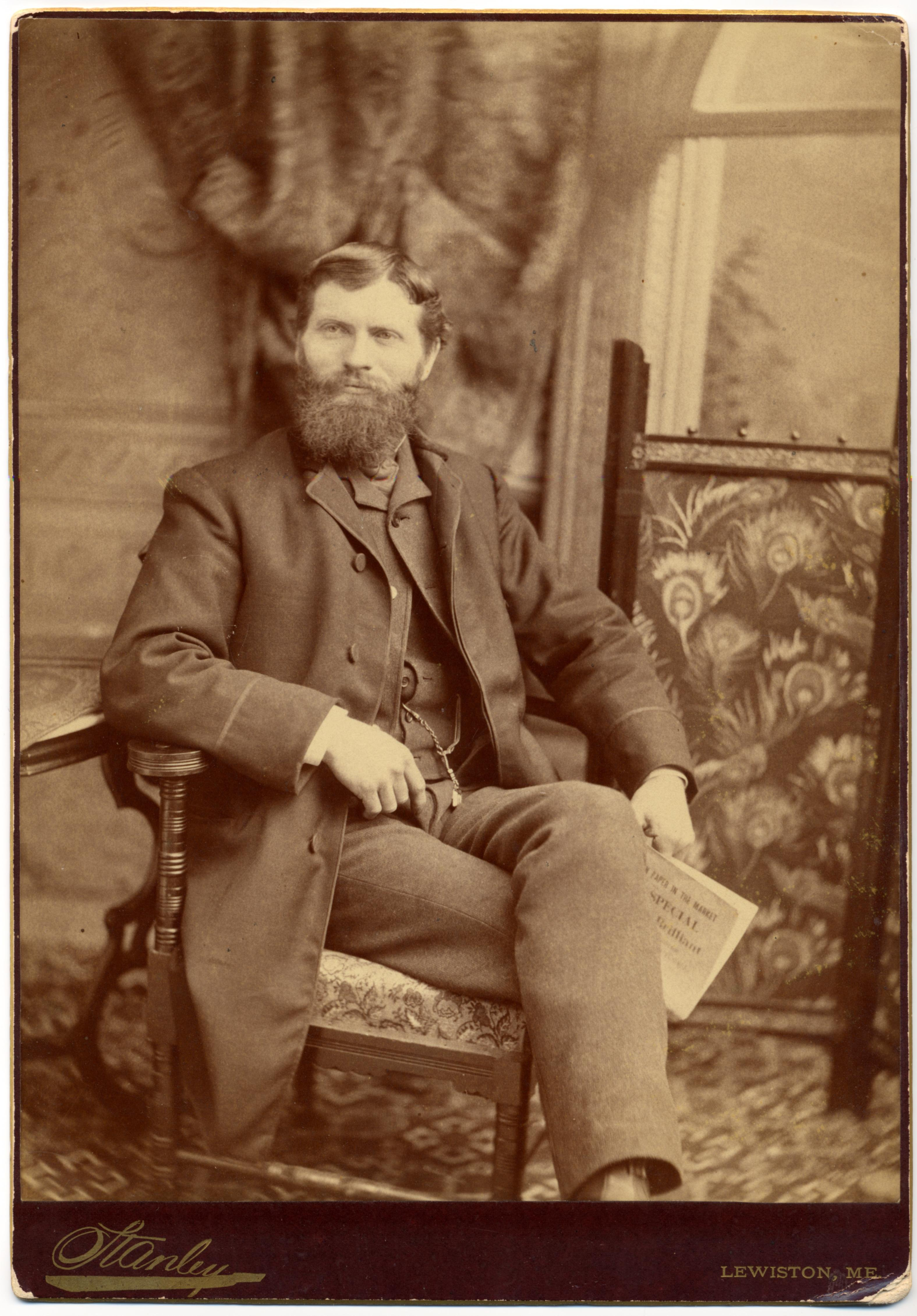
Francis Edgar Stanley in his studio

After leaving school, Francis Stanley married Augusta May Walker (1848-1927) and opened a portrait studio. His first technique was "crayon" or charcoal, supplemented with his "improvement to the Atomizer," a forerunner of the modern air brush, which he patented in 1876. In 1882, Francis began experimenting with photography, about which he became passionate. After his brother's factory burned, Francis suggested that they work together to create a new photographic product. By 1885, the Stanley brothers had established the Stanley Dry Plate Company in Lewiston, Maine.

The first primitive dry photo plate had been invented by the English physician Richard Leach Maddox in 1871. Charles Bennett made important improvements to the original formula but, ten years later, most photographers were still using a wet plate collodion process. By perfecting their factory process and marketing their product across the country, the Stanley Company quickly rose to dominance at the start of the market for factory-made (rather than studio-made) photo materials. The brothers amassed a small fortune and, in 1890, moved their business to Watertown, Massachusetts, and bought homes in nearby Newton.

In Newton, Freelan and Flora Stanley were members of well-to-do society. In 1894, Freelan built a Colonial Revival house at 165 Hunnewell Avenue in the Hunnewell Hill neighborhood of Newton Corner. In 1896, his brother built a home for his family nearby at 638 Centre Street and soon acquired a summer residence at Squirrel Island, Maine. In 1897-98 the twins purchased land for and began construction of the Hunnewell Club, the seat of a social organization for their friends and neighbors. The building had a ballroom, billiard tables, and bowling alleys.

In 1900-1904, Freelan drew plans for the Amos G. Winter House in Kingfield, Maine. L.A. Norton executed the construction of the house which still stands at 33 Winter's Hill Road and is similar to Freelan's other architectural designs.

== Stanley Motor Carriage Company ==
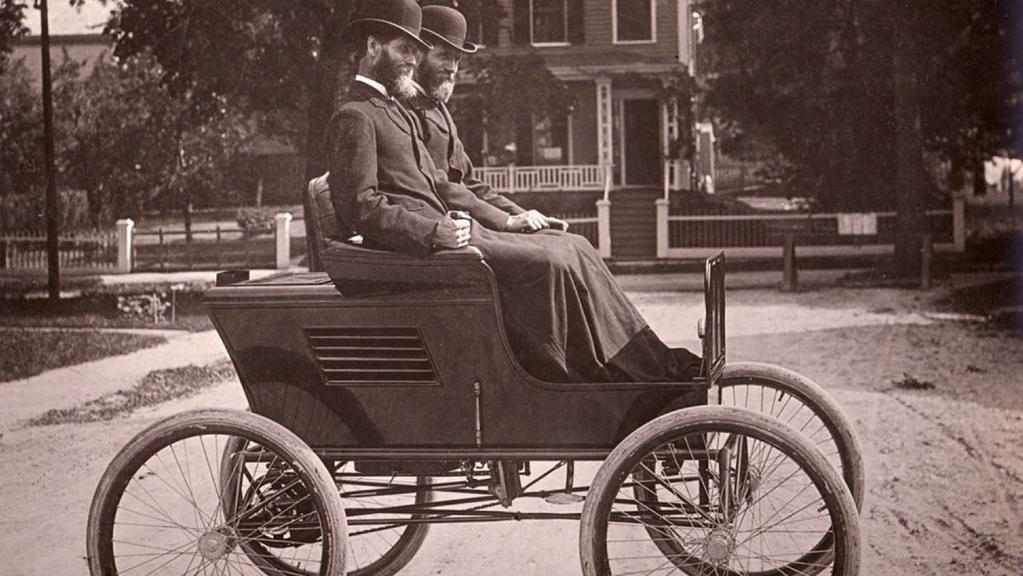
The Stanley Brothers in one of their steam cars circa 1898

Freelan and Francis Stanley were well-poised to immerse themselves in the many technological advancements happening around them. Adjacent to the Stanley dry-plate factory in Watertown was a bicycle factory owned by Sterling Elliott. Francis became fascinated by the new bicycle craze and attempted to interest his wife in it. When she fell off and swore she would never ride again, Francis told her, "Never you mind, Gustie. I will build something so that we can ride together in safety and comfort." Francis began to build an automobile, a project that soon absorbed his attention. After considering the merits of combustion, electricity, and steam, he determined that steam was the most practical. His brother and he would hold steadfastly to the superiority of steam power well after the combustion engine superseded it.

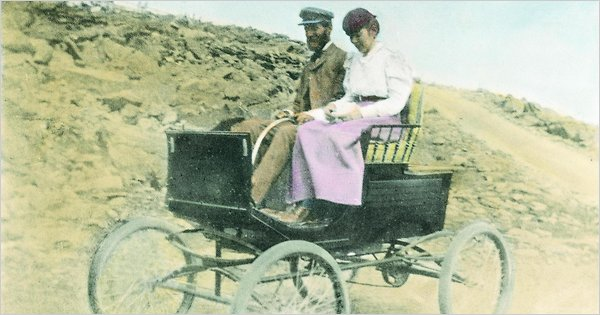
Freelan and Flora Stanley at the summit of Mt. Washington in a Stanley Motor Carriage after the company was sold to John Brisben Walker, 1899

By 1897, Francis Stanley had sold his horses and buggies and built his first automobile, using wagon and bicycle parts from Sterling Elliott's factory. The following year, the Stanley brothers took the car to the Boston Auto Show (1898) held in Charles River Park. It so impressed the crowd that Freelan Stanley became committed to his brother's passion for steam cars and they began to produce them on order as the Stanley Motor Carriage Company.

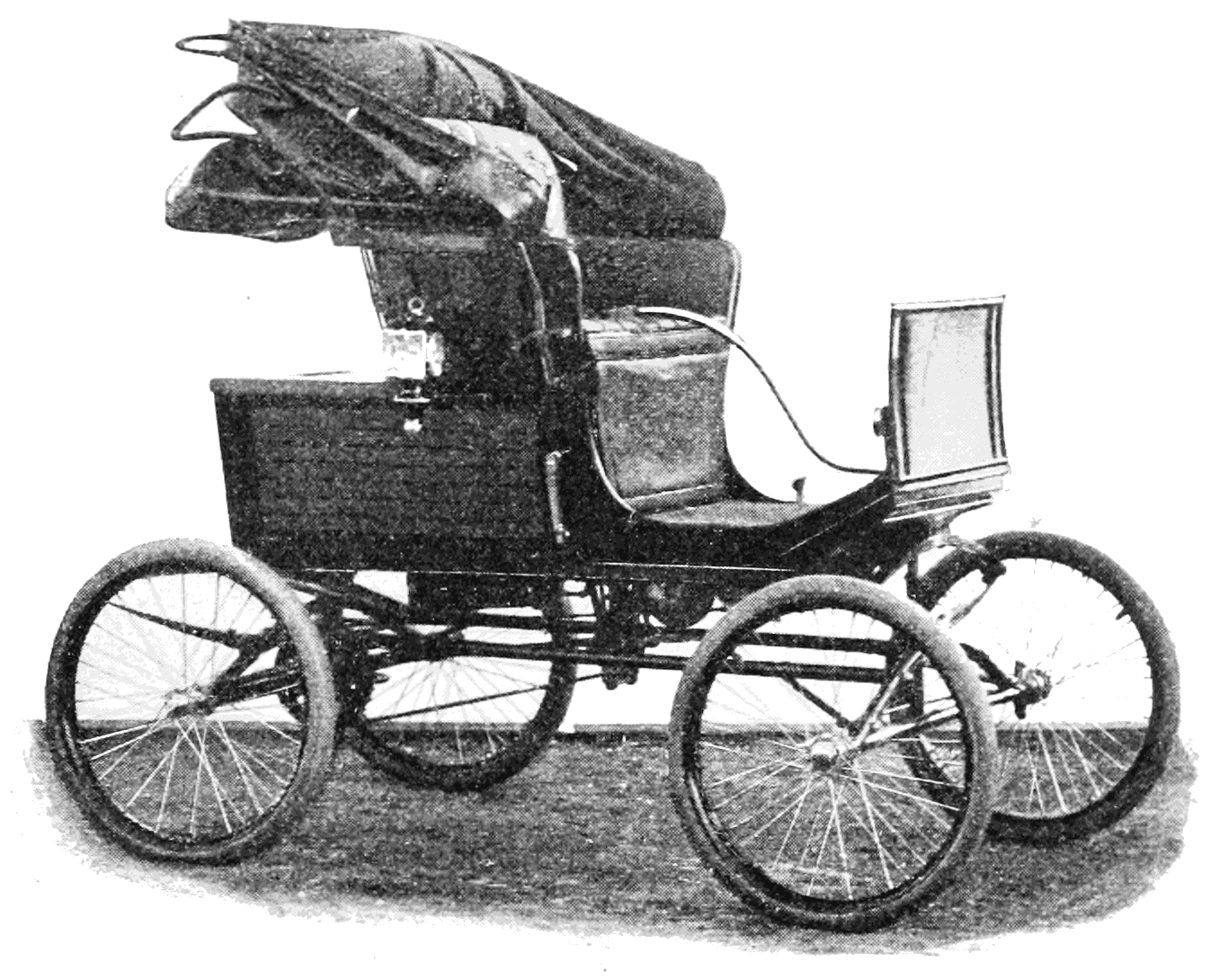
A Stanley-designed Locomobile

In 1899, John Brisben Walker (editor of Cosmopolitan Magazine, and an early investor in the area around Colorado Springs) expressed interest in purchasing the Stanleys' car business. Reluctant to sell, the brothers asked for a good deal more than they thought Walker would be willing to pay: $250,000 in ready cash. To their surprise, Walker accepted their offer, although he had to seek the partnership of "Asphalt King" Amzi L. Barber to finance the deal. For a few months, while Walker and Barber managed the enterprise together, the Stanley Brothers stayed on as consultants, Francis in manufacturing and Freelan in marketing. This period was distinguished by a number of publicity stunts for which Stanley automobiles received much notoriety.

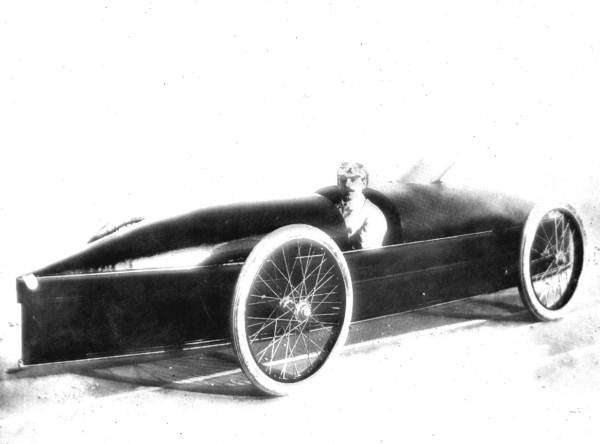
Driver Fred Marriott behind the wheel of the Stanley Rocket Racer

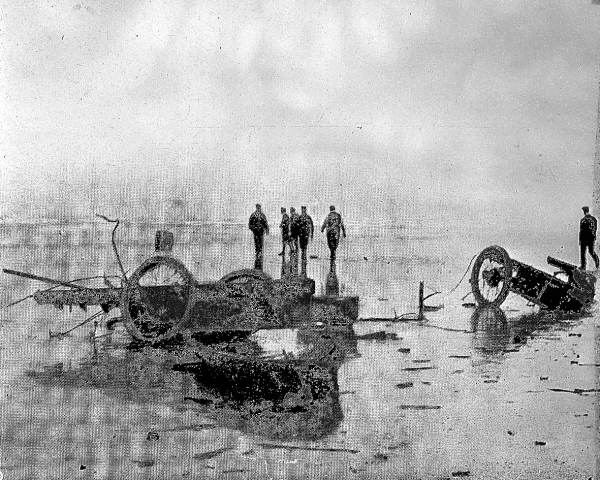
The demolished Rocket Racer (1907)

In August 1899, Freelan and Flora Stanley became the first motorists to reach the top of Mt. Washington, the highest peak in New England. In November of that year, Freelan gave William McKinley a tour of Washington DC in a Stanley automobile, which was the first time a sitting U.S. President had ridden in a car.

Within months, due to disagreements, Walker and Barber had parted ways and created two separate car companies. Walker's company, the Mobile Company of America, moved into a new factory in North Tarrytown, New York, designed by the architect Sanford White. Barber's Locomobile Company of America, which became more successful after switching to a gasoline internal combustion engine, moved in 1900 to Bridgeport, Connecticut, an important early center for the American auto industry.

Disappointed by the disintegration of their former company, Freelan and Francis decided to start again from scratch. Their name was no longer in use and their former factory had been vacated by Barber, but the patents still belonged to Locomobile. The Stanleys resolved this problem by changing and improving their original designs. In 1901, they began production of a new Stanley Motor Carriage under their old name. The quality of their new cars was such that their rival in the photo plate business, George Eastman (of Kodak, Rochester, NY), became an avid customer, acquiring a Steamer in 1901. "If the electric [automobile] is a 'peach,'" he once remarked, "then the Stanley is a 'peacherina.'" The original Stanley auto patents were purchased back from Walker in 1903 for $20,000, the same year that Locomobile abandoned steam for combustion. In 1905, the Stanleys sold their dry plate company to Eastman Kodak and Eastman soon dissolved it.

In 1906, with driver Fred Marriott behind the wheel, the Stanleys' specially designed "Rocket Racer" broke the land speed record, achieving 127.66 miles per hour over one kilometer at Ormond Beach, Florida, earning them the Dewar Trophy. The following year, when they attempted to break their own record, the Rocket Racer crashed. Although Marriott was not killed, the Stanley brothers decided to set aside their record-breaking ambitions. They did plan to compete in the 1906 Vanderbilt Cup Race with a specially designed "Vanderbilt Racer" but they were disqualified by the strict entry requirements.

== Estes Park, Colorado ==
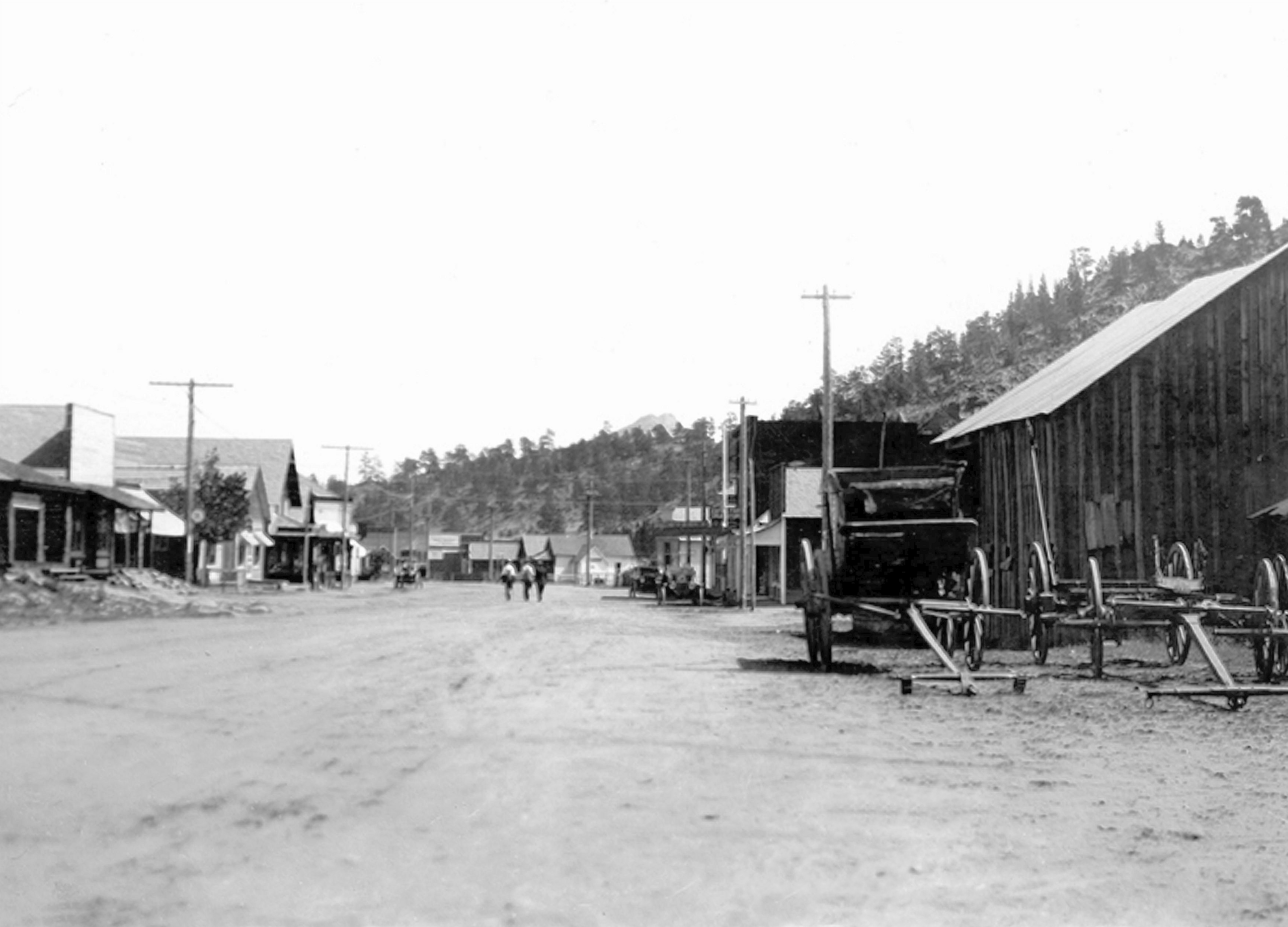
Main Street, Estes Park, CO, 1912

In 1903, Freelan Stanley was stricken with a life-threatening resurgence of tuberculosis. The most highly recommended treatment of the day was fresh, dry air with lots of sunlight and a hearty diet. Like many "lungers" of his day, he resolved to take the possibly curative air of the Rocky Mountains in Colorado. This decision may have been influenced by his acquaintance with John Brisben Walker, who had been a property investor in Colorado since 1880 and became a resident of Morrison, Colorado after selling Cosmopolitan to William Randolph Hearst in 1905.

Freelan and Flora arrived in Denver in March, 1903, followed shortly by his Stanley Runabout which was shipped by train. After one night at the Brown Palace Hotel, Stanley arranged an appointment with Dr. Sherman G. Bonney (MD, Harvard, 1889), the preeminent American expert on tuberculosis. Dr. Bonney, a great advocate for home treatment, advised Stanley to leave the hotel for a rented house as soon as possible. Stanley spent the remainder of the winter at 1401 Gilpin Street but, when his symptoms had not improved by June, he decided to spend the summer in the Colorado mountains. Bonney recommended Estes Park, whose climate he compared with that of Davos, Switzerland, a posh resort for European tuberculosis patients. On June 29, Stanley saw Flora off by train and stagecoach while he set out in his car. After getting lost and spending the night in Boulder, Stanley arrived on June 30. During their first summer, the couple rented a primitive cabin from the owners of the Elkhorn Lodge.

By the end of that summer, Stanley's health had improved dramatically. Impressed by the beauty of the valley and grateful for his recovery, he decided to return every summer and acquired property in Estes Park for that purpose. With the help of English architect Henry "Lord Cornwallis" Rogers, with whom he had recently become acquainted, Stanley began the construction of a summer home there, which he called Rockside. Completed in 1904, it had four bedrooms, gracious living areas, and a modern kitchen so that Flora could entertain guests. Stanley, whose primary leisure activities involved billiards, violins, and steam cars, designed a basement with space for a billiard table and a detached garage with a violin workshop and a turntable, so that the steam car could exit without reversing. The front door of the house opened onto a veranda facing south with a view across the Estes Valley toward Long's Peak. Dr. Sherman Bonney, who apparently approved of his patient's choices, included images of the house in his 1908 book, Pulmonary Tuberculosis and Its Complications. It remains standing today west of the Stanley Hotel, where it has been restored and is now a museum.

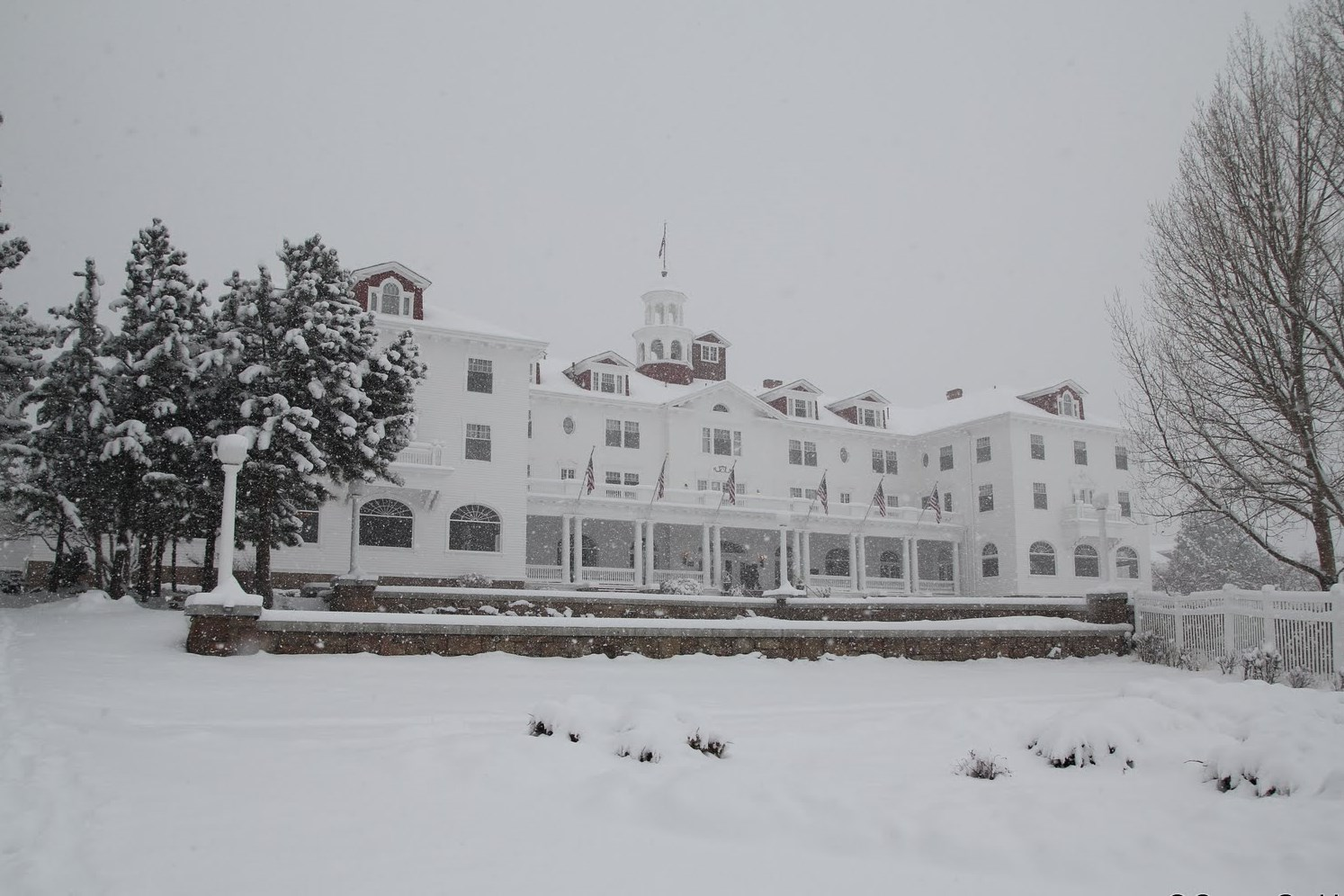
The Stanley Hotel in Estes Park, CO

By 1907, Stanley and his wife had become enamored of the beauty of the Colorado mountains, comparing them to the "rock-ribbed" hills "ancient as the sun" of William Cullen Bryant's Thanatopsis. Not content with the rustic accommodations, lazy pastimes, and relaxed social scene of their new home, Stanley resolved to turn Estes Park into a resort town. In 1907, construction began on the Stanley Hotel, designed to cater to wealthy urbanites like those in the Stanleys' social circle in Newton. Construction was steel frame with clapboarding on a granite foundation. Executed to Stanley's specifications, the structure was built with the professional aid of Denver architect, Theilman Robert Weiger.

To power the hotel, Stanley constructed the Fall River Hydro-Plant, which brought electricity to Estes Park for the first time. Upon opening, the hotel had a fully electric kitchen and steam laundry, a hydraulic elevator, electric lights and telephones, and 48 guest rooms, each pair sharing a bathroom. Near the hotel, Stanley built a concert hall with a Steinway grand piano as a gift for Flora. During the day, guests at the Stanley enjoyed golf, bowling, horseback-riding, and motor excursions; at night there were formal dinners, concerts, and lighter entertainment such as billiards.

The steam car played a pivotal role in the hotel's operation: to transport visitors to and from the hotel, Stanley created a 12-seat model which was thereafter marketed as the "Mountain Wagon" and became popular at other resorts such as those near present-day Olympic National Park in the State of Washington.

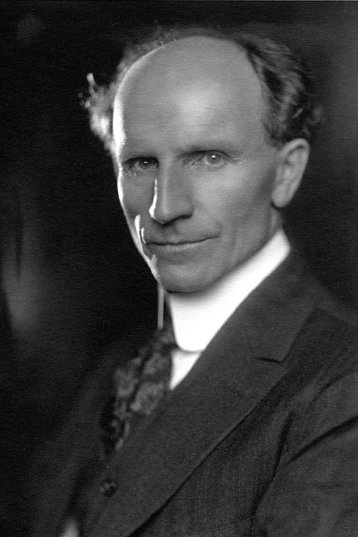
Enos Mills, naturalist. father of Rocky Mountain National Park

Stanley's presence and the hotel's construction provided enormous impetus to the town of Estes Park, which incorporated in 1917. In 1904, Stanley organized and partially funded the paving of the Big Thompson Canyon Road (today US 34) to Loveland and, in 1907, the paving of the St. Vrain Road (today US 36). In 1906, he became president of the Protective and Improvement Association, and in 1907, first president of the Estes Park Bank. By 1908, he had purchased the ranch lands of Lord Dunraven, much of which he gradually donated to the town. His largest grant, given in 1936, is now occupied in part by the man-made Lake Estes (formed by Olympus Dam 1947-48) the fairgrounds (1941), the town's elementary and high schools, and the Estes Park Museum.

F.O. Stanley is also known for his role in the creation of Rocky Mountain National Park. As president of the Protective and Improvement Association, he was aware that the value of the Estes Valley lay in its natural beauty and wildlife. To help sustain these despite the growing number of tourists and sportsmen, he organized the establishment of the Fall River Fish Hatchery in 1907 and the introduction of a herd of elk from Yellowstone National Park in 1913, the offspring of which are now abundant in the Estes Valley. Most importantly, he forged a friendship with naturalist Enos Mills, who ran the rustic Long's Peak Inn. With Stanley's encouragement and financial support, Mills traveled the country to campaign for the protection of the Rockies of north-central Colorado. In 1915, Woodrow Wilson signed the order establishing Rocky Mountain National Park, the tenth in US history and, today, the fourth most-visited of the country's 63 national parks.

In 1926, Freelan sold the hotel to the Stanley Corporation, a private company established to manage his assets in Estes Park. Without his fortune to support the operating costs, the corporation soon filed for bankruptcy. Freelan purchased the hotel back at a low price and sold it in 1930 to auto and hotel magnate Roe Emery of Denver, who remained the owner until 1947. The Stanleys continued to spend the summers at their nearby residence.

== Later life ==
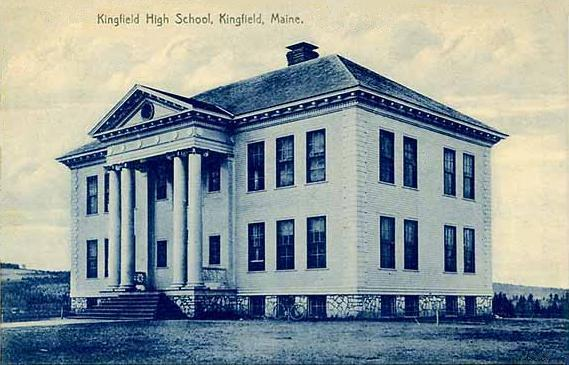
Stanley School, Kingfield, Maine, f. 1903. Today, the Stanley Museum.

After adopting Estes Park as his summer home, Freelan Stanley gradually shifted from his other business ventures to management of his hotel and philanthropy. In 1903, he endowed the construction of a new high school in his hometown of Kingfield, Maine. It remains standing today as a museum dedicated to his life. By 1917, at the age of 68, Freelan and Francis stepped down from management of the Stanley Motor Carriage Company. That year, Francis and his wife Augusta visited his brother's property in Estes Park for the first time. The following year, Francis was killed while driving a Stanley automobile on a country road near Wenham, Massachusetts. In 1918, Freelan sold his interests in the motor carriage company to his nephew-in-law, Prescott Warren, who continued the production of steam-powered vehicles until the company's closure in 1926.

Stanley served on many boards and committees. He became a trustee of Hebron Academy in 1911 and was president of the board from 1914 until his death. In 1926 he endowed the school with funds to build the Stanley Arena, the first enclosed high school hockey rink in the nation. Future pro-hockey players Eddie Jeremiah (Boston Bruins) and Danny Sullivan (Hershey Bears) played for Hebron as students. In 1913, Stanley became a trustee of the Maine State Sanatorium Association. In Estes Park, he served as president of numerous organizations whose mission was to improve and develop the town.

In 1933, his steam-powered car having long been superseded by combustion-powered models, Stanley called on Henry Ford, who now dominated the automobile industry, at his factory in Dearborn, Michigan. During the visit, Ford bought several of Stanley's violins.

By 1926, Flora Stanley's eyesight had deteriorated so that she was uncomfortable in places she didn't know well. Although the Stanleys continued to travel between Newton and Estes Park, Freelan began to think of retiring from public life and selling the hotel. In 1939, Flora died soon after suffering a stroke at Rockside. Freelan returned to Estes Park for the following summer but maintained an inconspicuous presence. On October 2, 1940, shortly after returning to Newton, Stanley died of heart failure at age 91.

== Personal characteristics ==
Raised in a Calvinist household in the then tee-totaling State of Maine, Stanley did not drink alcoholic beverages and, having survived tuberculosis, he did not smoke cigars, unlike many men of his day. Stanley's upbringing gave him a love of practical knowledge as well as an appreciation for music and poetry which he enjoyed throughout his life. His favorite pastimes were bowling, playing billiards, and working in his violin shop. The results of a bowling tournament held at the Hunnewell Club, published in the Newton Graphic, show that Stanley came in 1st place and his twin brother in 8th place. He was fiscally conservative and insisted on paying and being paid in cash. He was discreet in his religious and political affiliations. In 1902 Stanley wrote a letter to the Newton Graphic criticizing Christian Science and expressing some negative opinions about orthodox interpretations of scripture. He likely shared the attitudes expressed by biblical scholar Charles Augustus Briggs in his controversial address to the Union Theological Seminary in 1876.

He was devoted to his wife Flora, to whom he was married for 63 years until her death. They did not have children but remained close to their nieces and nephews, and were notoriously kind to the children of Estes Park and those who visited the Stanley Hotel. He showed a sense of humor, posing for photographs dressed as "your Western man" in a ten-gallon hat and woolly chaps, and as the "King of Estes Park" with a tin canister on his head for a crown, placed there by the local children.

== Architectural designs ==
- 1894, F.O. Stanley House, 165 Hunnewell Avenue, Newton, MA
- 1897-1998, The Hunnewell Club, 84 Eldredge Street, Newton, MA
- 1900-1904, "Hillholm" (Amos G. Winter House), 33 Winter's Hill Road, Kingfield, ME
- 1903-1905, "Rockside" (F.O. Stanley House), 415 W Wonderview Avenue, Estes Park, CO (With Henry Rogers)
- 1907-1908, The Stanley Hotel, 333 E Wonderview Avenue, Estes Park, CO (with Henry Rogers & Theilman Robert Weiger)

== Legacy ==
F.O. Stanley was inducted into the Colorado Business Hall of Fame by Rocky Mountain Junior Achievement and the Denver Metro Chamber of Commerce in 2016.

In 2016, the Stanley Hotel announced a competition for a sculpture for the center of the terrace in front of the hotel. Sculptors Sutton Betti and Daniel Glanz won the competition with a sculpture of F.O. Stanley holding one of his violins. The sculpture was installed and dedicated on September 29, 2016.

== See also ==
People

- Francis Edgar Stanley
- Chansonetta Stanley Emmons
- Fred Marriott
- John Brisben Walker
- George Eastman

Places

- Kingfield, ME
- Newton, MA
- Estes Park, CO
- National Register of Historic Places listings in Franklin County, Maine
- National Register of Historic Places listings in Larimer County, Colorado
- National Register of Historic Places listings in Newton, Massachusetts

Institutions

- Stanley Motor Carriage Company
- Mobile Company of America
- Locomobile Company of America
- Stanley Hotel
- Rocky Mountain National Park
