= Amos G. Winter House =

Historic house in Maine, United States

- U.S. National Register of Historic Places
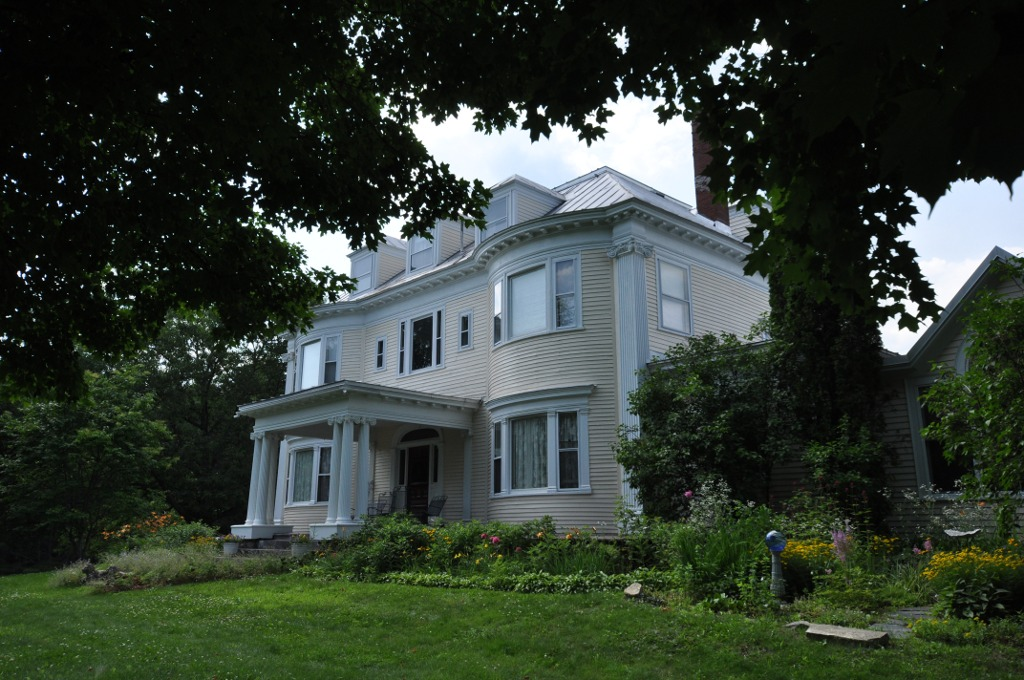

- Location within Maine Location within the United States
- Location: Winter's Hill off ME 27, Kingfield, Maine
- Coordinates: 44°57′33″N 70°9′37″W
- Area: 6 acres (2.4 ha)
- Built: 1896
- Architect: Freeland Stanley; Francis Stanley
- Architectural style: Colonial Revival
- NRHP reference No.: 76000191
- Added to NRHP: May 3, 1976

The Amos G. Winter House is a historic house on Winter's Hill in Kingfield, Maine. Built in the mid-1890s, it is a particularly elegant example of Colonial Revival architecture in a remote inland community. The house was designed by Francis and Freelan Stanley, multi-talented twins best known for development of the Stanley Steamer, and the house's original heating system was designed around a railroad engine boiler. It was listed on the National Register of Historic Places in 1976.

== Description and history ==
The Winter House is set on a hill north of the small village center of Kingfield and just south of the West Branch Carrabasset River. The hill affords fine views of the village and the Western Maine Mountains. It is a roughly square wood-frame structure, with a hip roof and a stone foundation. Its front facade is symmetrical, with rounded two-story bays flanking the center entrance, which is sheltered by a portico supported by groups of fluted columns, with a dentillated cornice beneath its hip roof. The entrance itself is flanked by sidelight windows and topped by a half-oval fanlight window, with pilasters matching the columns where the portico joins the wall. The rounded bays have curved three-part windows, with narrow sashes flanking large picture windows. Three hip-roof dormers pierce the front roof line. The main block of the house is flanked on either side by lower wings. The interior has retained much of its original decorative work despite a variety of adaptive reuses of the building over time.

The house was built for Amos G. Winter, a local grain merchant and owner of a general store. Winter was friends with the Stanley twins, who were also Kingfield natives. Among the innovations the Stanleys put in the building were a steam-driven heating system whose centerpiece was a railroad engine boiler. A steam-driven elevator was planned but not installed. The house was occupied by the Winters until 1950, and was then adapted for use first as a doctor's office and clinic, then as a restaurant and inn, and later converted to multiunit residential use. In 2015 it was reopened as The Inn on Winter's Hill.

== See also ==
- National Register of Historic Places listings in Franklin County, Maine
