= Francis Stanley =

Francis Stanley may refer to:

- Francis Edgar Stanley, American businessman
- Francis Drummond Greville Stanley, architect in Queensland, Australia
