= Chansonetta Stanley Emmons =

American photographer (1858–1937)

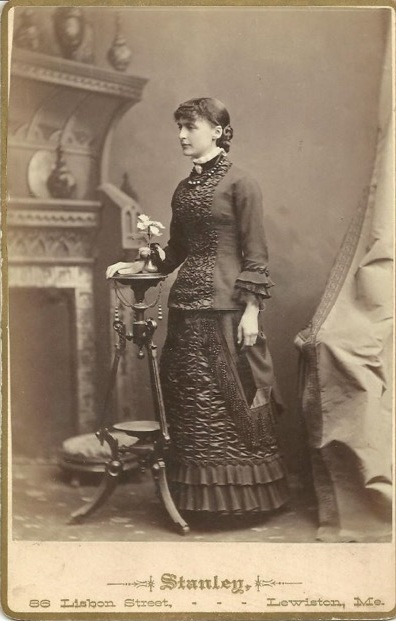
- Born: 30 December 1858; Kingfield
- Died: 18 March 1937 (aged 78); Kingfield
- Occupation: Photographer
- Children: Dorothy Stanley Emmons
- Relatives: Freelan Oscar Stanley, Francis Edgar Stanley

Chansonetta Stanley Emmons (1858—1937) was an American photographer in the 19th and early 20th century. Emmons' photography depicts scenes of domestic life and New England rural landscape. Born December 30, 1858 in the mill town of Kingfield, Maine, the young Chansonetta Stanley grew interested in photography after her brothers' (Francis E. and Freelan O. Stanley) dry-plate printing invention. (The brothers also invented the steam-powered automobile known as the Stanley Steamer).

On February 2, 1887, she married James Nathaniel Whitman Emmons. Her brother Freelan O. Stanley bought her a large house at 22 Harley Street in Ashmont Hill, Dorchester, Massachusetts. in 1895. Chansonetta gave birth in 1891 to a daughter, Dorothy Stanley Emmons, and there exist photographs of the Emmons home and family scenes in Dorchester from the 1890s. After her husband James died in 1898 of blood poisoning at the age of 41, Chansonetta and Dorothy were forced to leave Dorchester and move to Newton, Massachusetts.

Chansonetta viewed photography as a way to supplement her income after her husband's death, participating in photographic competitions, camera club exhibitions and lectures which featured her photography reproduced as hand-colored glass lantern slides. Her wealthy brothers also gave financial support throughout her life. Chansonetta is unique in that relatively few photographers, especially women, in the beginning of the 20th century were focused on the "domestic vernacular" especially in rural northern New England. Chansonetta died at age 79 in 1937.

The Stanley Museum in Kingfield, Maine owns the largest collection of Chansonetta Stanley Emmons photographic prints and glass plate negatives in the world, including her hand-colored glass lantern slides.

Her earliest photographs consist of images of her family house in Dorchester.

In August 2016 the Maine Historical Society accepted the Chansonetta Stanley Emmons Collection on deposit from the Stanley Museum (Kingfield, Maine). The collection is being housed for five years during which the Society is providing year-round public access to, and interpretation of, the collection via its Brown Library, Maine Memory Network, and Vintage Maine Images. While not a typical arrangement for the Society, it is providing an opportunity to expand the viability and audience of the collection which includes over 1,500 images of Maine farm and family life from the early 20th century through the 1930s as well to foster scholarship in the photographic medium invented by Chansonsetta Stanley's brothers, a process later sold to Kodak. An exhibition of the work, including rare hand-painted lantern slides was mounted in 2022.
