= The Stanley Hotel =

Colonial Revival hotel in Estes Park, Colorado

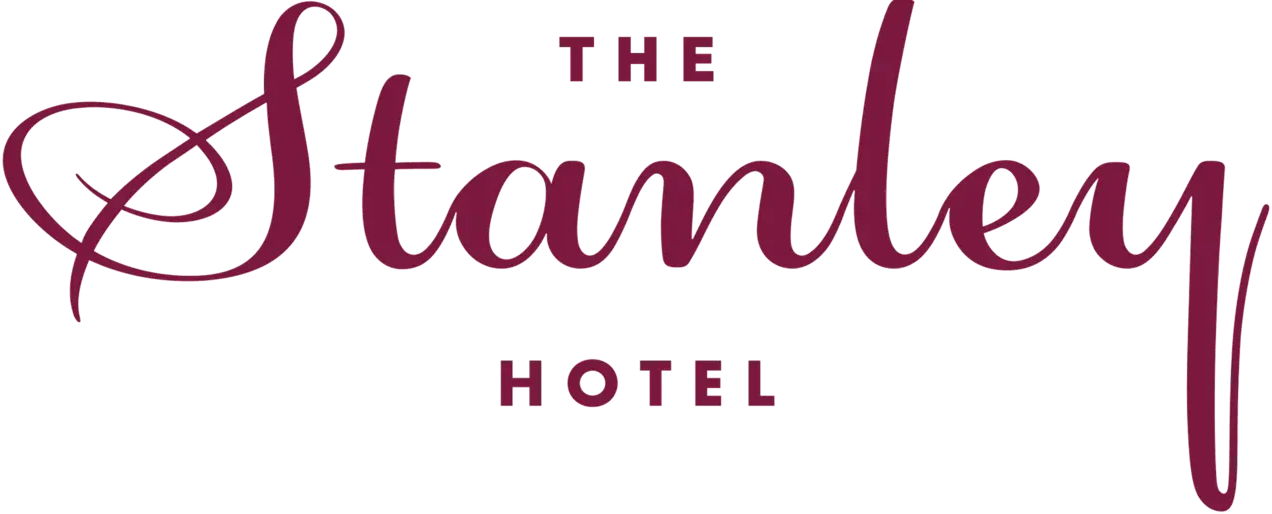

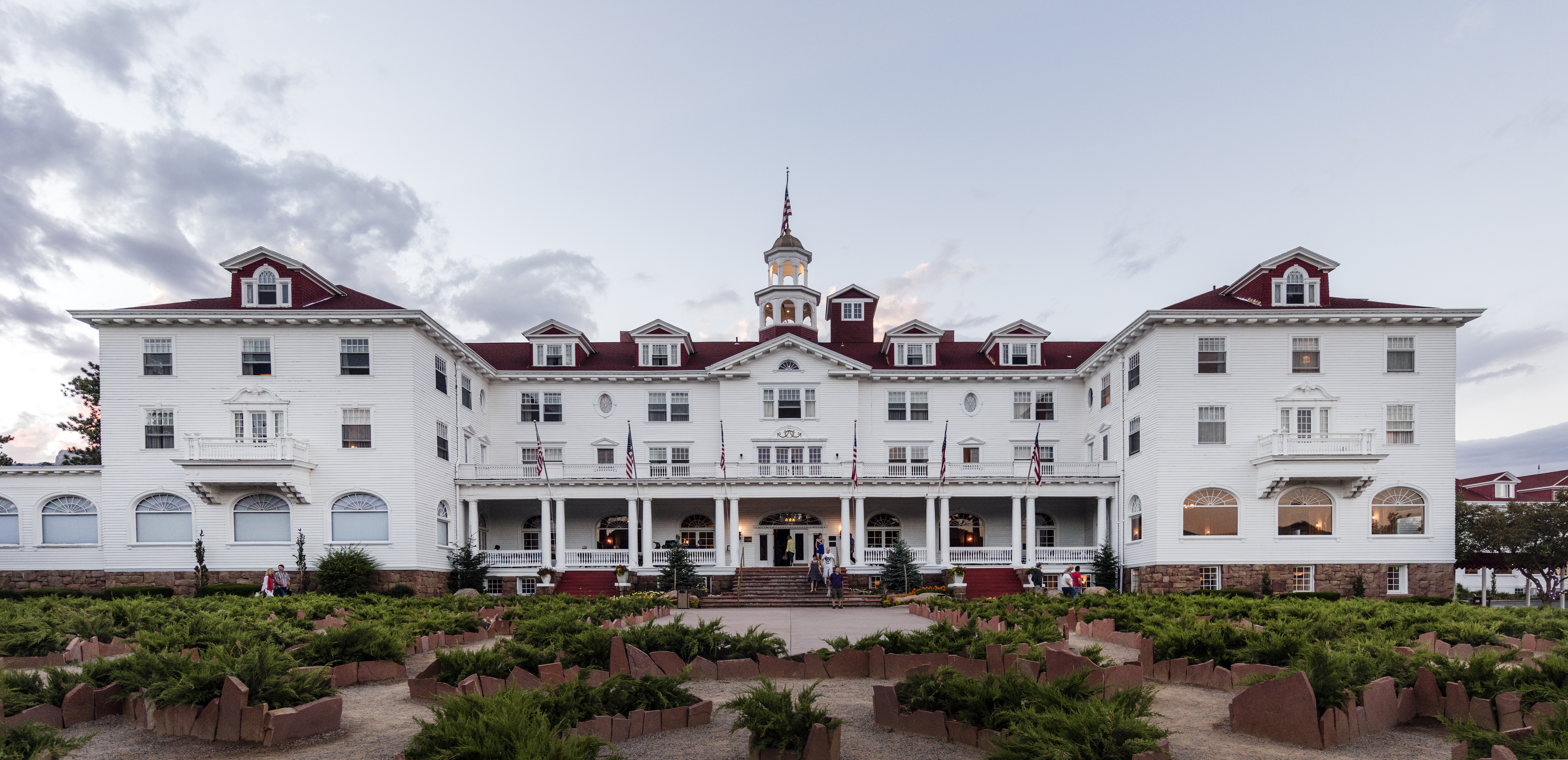
- The Stanley Hotel in 2024

General information
- Architectural style: Colonial Revival
- Location: 333 Wonderview Avenue, Estes Park, Colorado
- Coordinates: 40°22′58″N 105°31′09″W
- Year built: 1907–1910

Design and construction
- Architects: Freelan Oscar Stanley; Thielman Robert Weiger; Henry Rogers

Website
- stanleyhotel.com

U.S. National Register of Historic Places
- Type: Historic district
- Designated: May 26, 1977
- Reference no.: 85001256
- Boundary increases: June 20, 1985, and April 16, 1998

The Stanley Hotel is a 140-room Georgian Revival hotel in Estes Park, Colorado, United States, about 5 miles (8.0 km) from the entrance to Rocky Mountain National Park. The hotel is considered one of America's most haunted hotels. It includes a restaurant, spa, and bed-and-breakfast; with panoramic views of Lake Estes, the Rockies, and Longs Peak.

In May 2025, it was reported that the century-old hotel had been acquired by The Stanley Partnership for Art Culture and Education for $400 million. It is a public-private partnership formed by CEFCA (Colorado Educational and Cultural Facilities Authority), former owner John Cullen IV now chairman of the ownership board, and private bond investors.

== Overview ==
It was built by Freelan Oscar Stanley, co-founder of the Stanley Motor Carriage Company. The property opened on July 4, 1909, as a resort for upper-class Easterners and a health retreat for sufferers of pulmonary tuberculosis. The hotel and its surrounding structures are listed on the National Register of Historic Places.

The Stanley Hotel served as the inspiration for the Overlook Hotel in Stephen King's 1977 novel The Shining and its 1980 film adaptation. It was also a filming location for the related 1997 TV miniseries.

== History ==
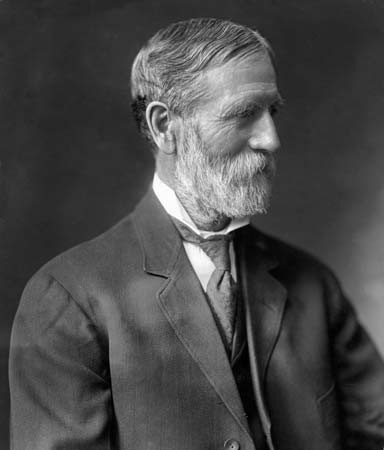
F.O. Stanley, the hotel's founder circa 1910

In 1903, the steam-powered car inventor Freelan Oscar Stanley (1849–1940) was stricken with a life-threatening resurgence of tuberculosis. The most highly recommended treatment of the day was fresh, dry air with much sunlight and a hearty diet. Therefore, like many "lungers" of his day, Stanley resolved to take the curative air of the Rocky Mountains. He and his wife Flora arrived in Denver, Colorado, in March and, in June, on the recommendation of Dr. Sherman Grant Bonney, moved to Estes Park, Colorado, for the rest of the summer. Over the season, Stanley's health improved dramatically. Impressed by the beauty of the valley and grateful for his recovery, he decided to return every year. He lived to 91, dying of a heart attack in Newton, Massachusetts, one year after his wife, in 1940.

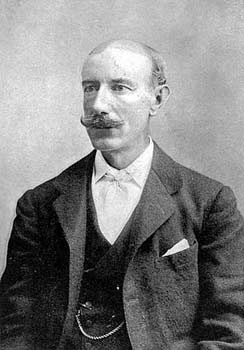
The 4th Earl of Dunraven and Mount-Earl.

By 1907, Stanley had recovered completely. However, not content with the rustic accommodations, lazy pastimes and relaxed social scene of their new summer home, Stanley resolved to turn Estes Park into a resort town. In 1907, construction began on the Hotel Stanley, a 48-room grand hotel that catered to the class of moderately wealthy urbanites who composed the Stanleys' social circle back east as well as to consumptives seeking the healthful climate.

The land was purchased in 1908 through the representatives of The 4th Earl of Dunraven and Mount-Earl, the Anglo-Irish peer who had originally acquired it by stretching the provisions of the Homestead Act of 1862 and pre-emption rights. Between 1872 and 1884, Lord Dunraven claimed 15,000 acres (61 km^{2}) of the Estes Valley in an unsuccessful attempt to create a private hunting preserve, making him one of the largest foreign holders of American lands. Unpopular with the local ranchers and farmers, Dunraven left the area in 1884, relegating the ranch to the management of an overseer. Dunraven's presence in Colorado was parodied in Charles King's novel Dunraven Ranch (1892) and James A. Michener's Centennial (1974). His reputation was such that, when Stanley suggested "The Dunraven" as a name for his new hotel, 180 people signed a buckskin petition requesting that he name it for himself instead.

The main hotel and concert hall were completed in 1909 and the Manor in 1910. To bring guests from the nearest train depot in the foothills town of Lyons, Colorado, Stanley's car company produced a fleet of specially designed steam-powered vehicles called Mountain Wagons that seated multiple passengers. Stanley operated the hotel almost as a pastime, remarking once that he spent more money than he made each summer.

In 1926, Stanley sold his hotel to a private company incorporated for the sole purpose of running it. The venture failed and, in 1929, Stanley purchased his property out of foreclosure, selling it again in 1930 to fellow automobile and hotel magnate Roe Emery of Denver. Until 1983, the resort was only open during the summer, shutting down for the winter every year. The presence of the hotel and Stanley's own involvement greatly contributed to the growth of Estes Park (incorporated in 1917) and the creation of the Rocky Mountain National Park (established in 1915).

The hotel was a member of Historic Hotels of America, a program of the National Trust for Historic Preservation, but is not part of the program as of 2022.

=== 1911 gas explosion ===
Upon opening, the hotel was alleged to be one of the few in the world powered entirely by electricity. However, lack of available power induced the installation of an auxiliary gas lighting system in June 1911. On June 25 – the day after the pipes had been filled – an explosion occurred that injured a maid and damaged the structure, though contemporary newspaper articles differ on certain details.

A brief article telegraphed to the York Dispatch (of York, Pennsylvania) and circulated by the Associated Press the following day said:

The Stanley Hotel, built at a cost of $500,000, was partly wrecked last night by an explosion of gas. Eight persons were injured, one seriously. None of the guests were injured. Elizabeth Wilson, of Lancaster, Pa., a hotel employee, was hurled from the second to the first floor, and both ankles were broken. The other seven are negro waiters.

When the Lancaster paper reprinted the story, the editor noted that Elizabeth Wilson's name did not appear in local directories and she could not be identified as a Lancastrian. Similar accounts in local Colorado papers give the maid's name as Elizabeth Lambert and convey various dramatic details that are not confirmed by other articles. The most comprehensive and detailed article on the incident appeared on June 29 in the Fort Collins Express and seems to be the most accurate – positively refuting that the maid had been "hurled from the second to the first floor".

=== Frozen Dead Guy ===
In August 2023, Colorado's famous cryogenically frozen man, Bredo Morstøl, the inspiration for Colorado's annual Frozen Dead Guy Days festival, was relocated to the Stanley's ice house. The Alcor Life Extension Foundation assisted with relocating the body from its prior home in a Nederland shed and setting up a new cryonic chamber to contain the frozen corpse. The hotel named the ice house the "International Cryonics Museum" and offers paid tours to visit it.

== Gallery ==
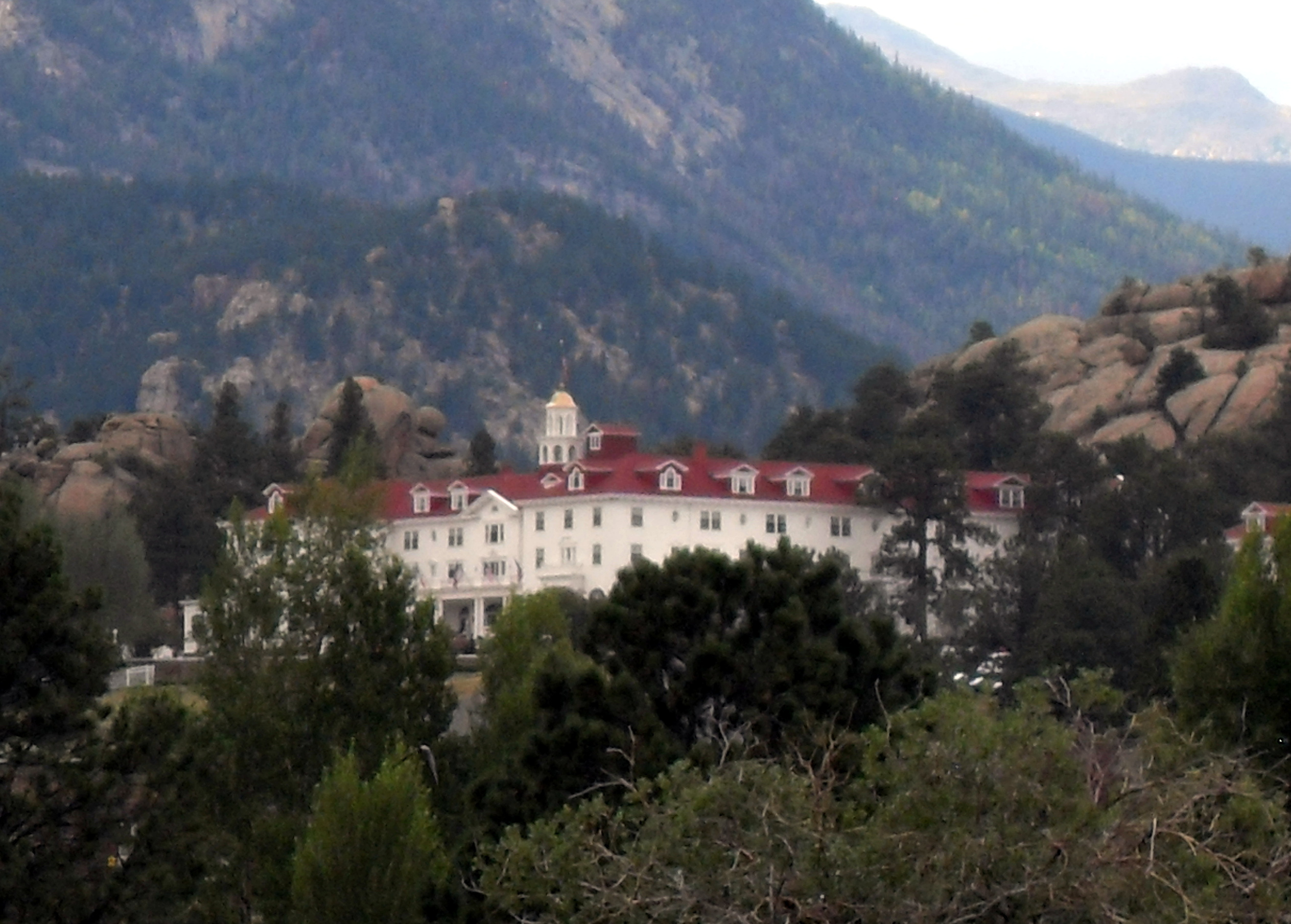
June 2008

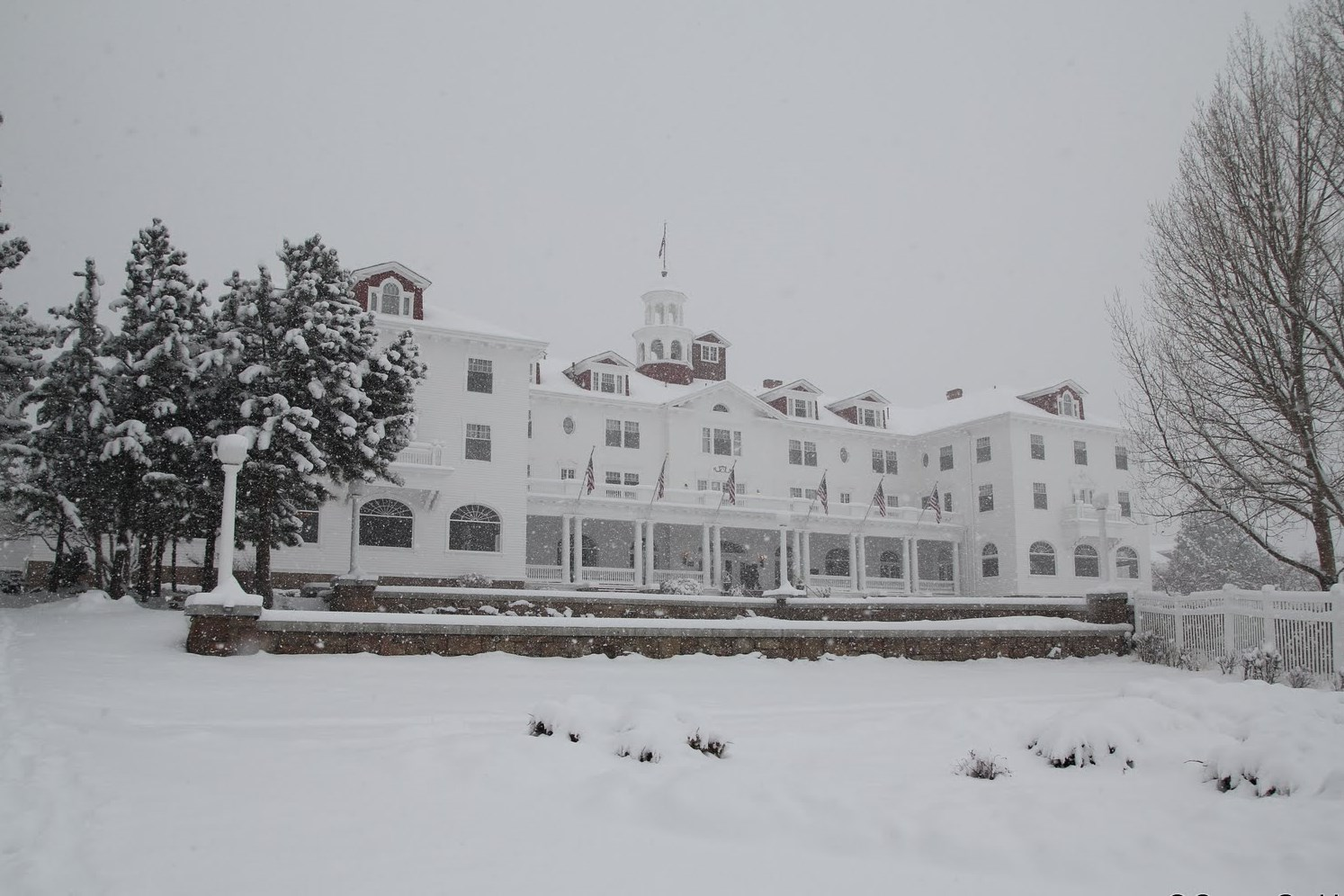
February 2011

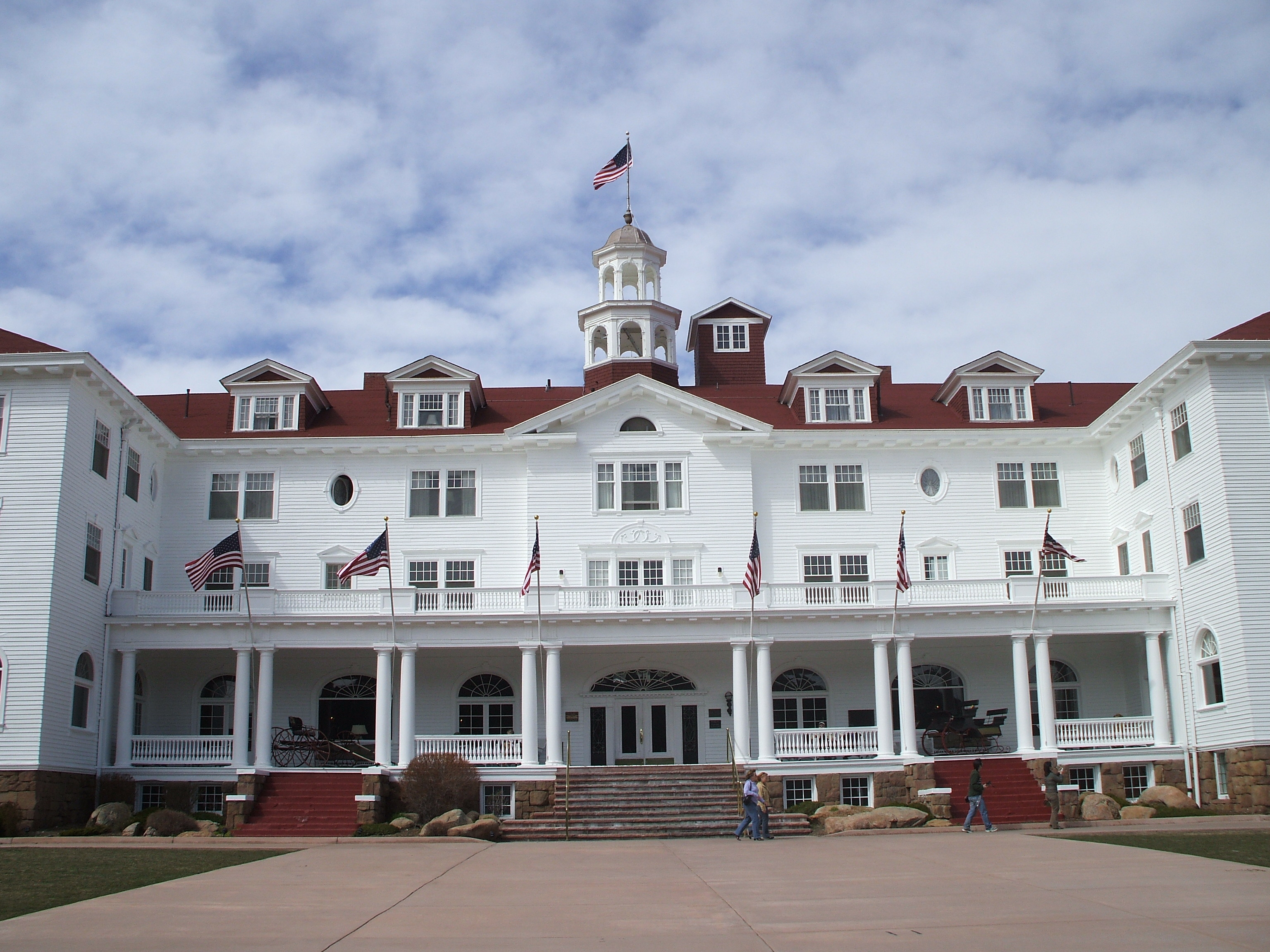
South elevation

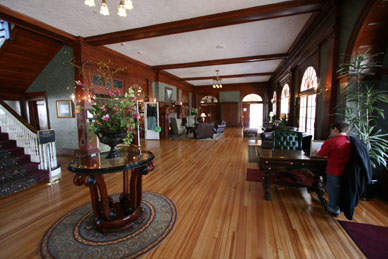
Lobby looking east

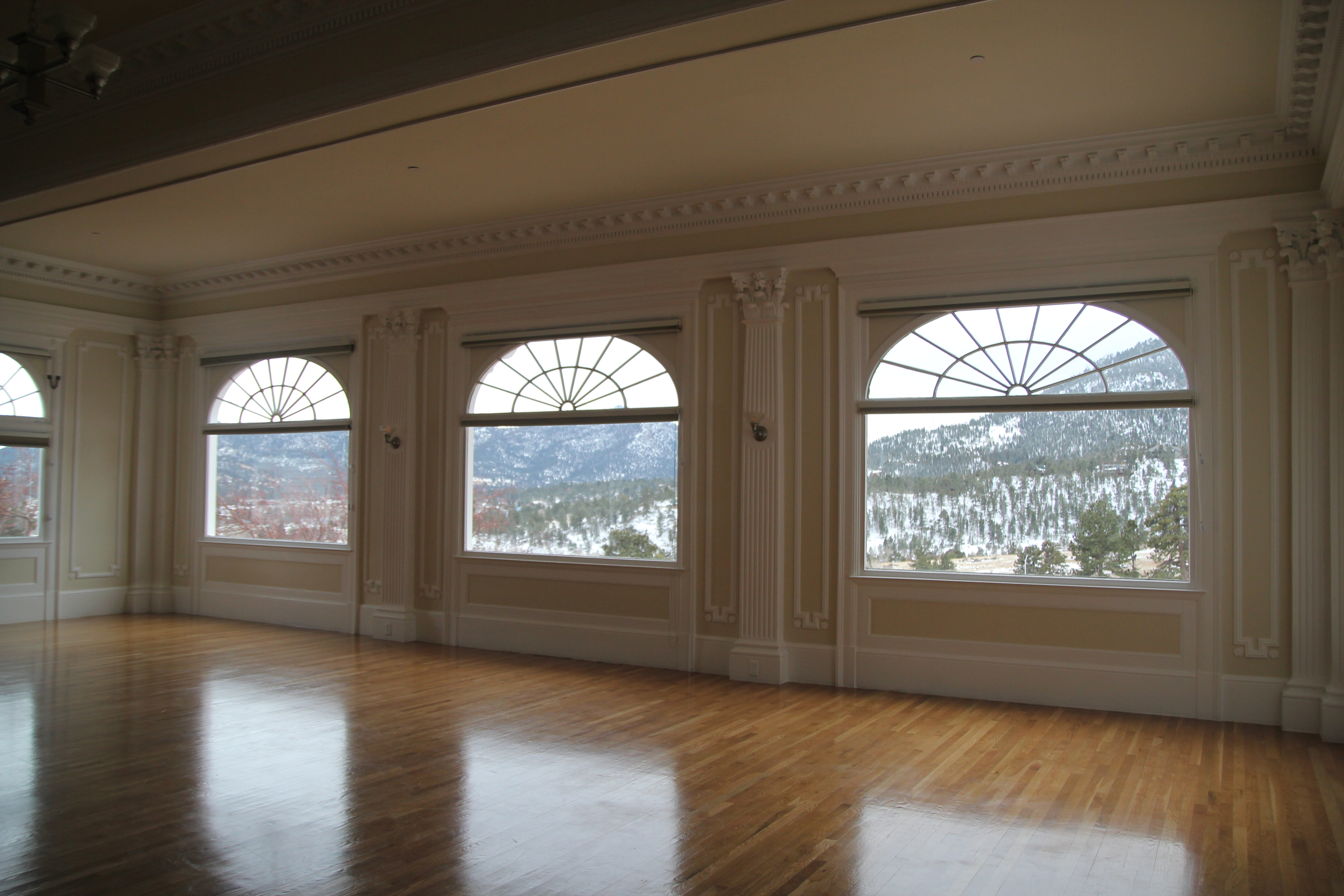
Music room looking south

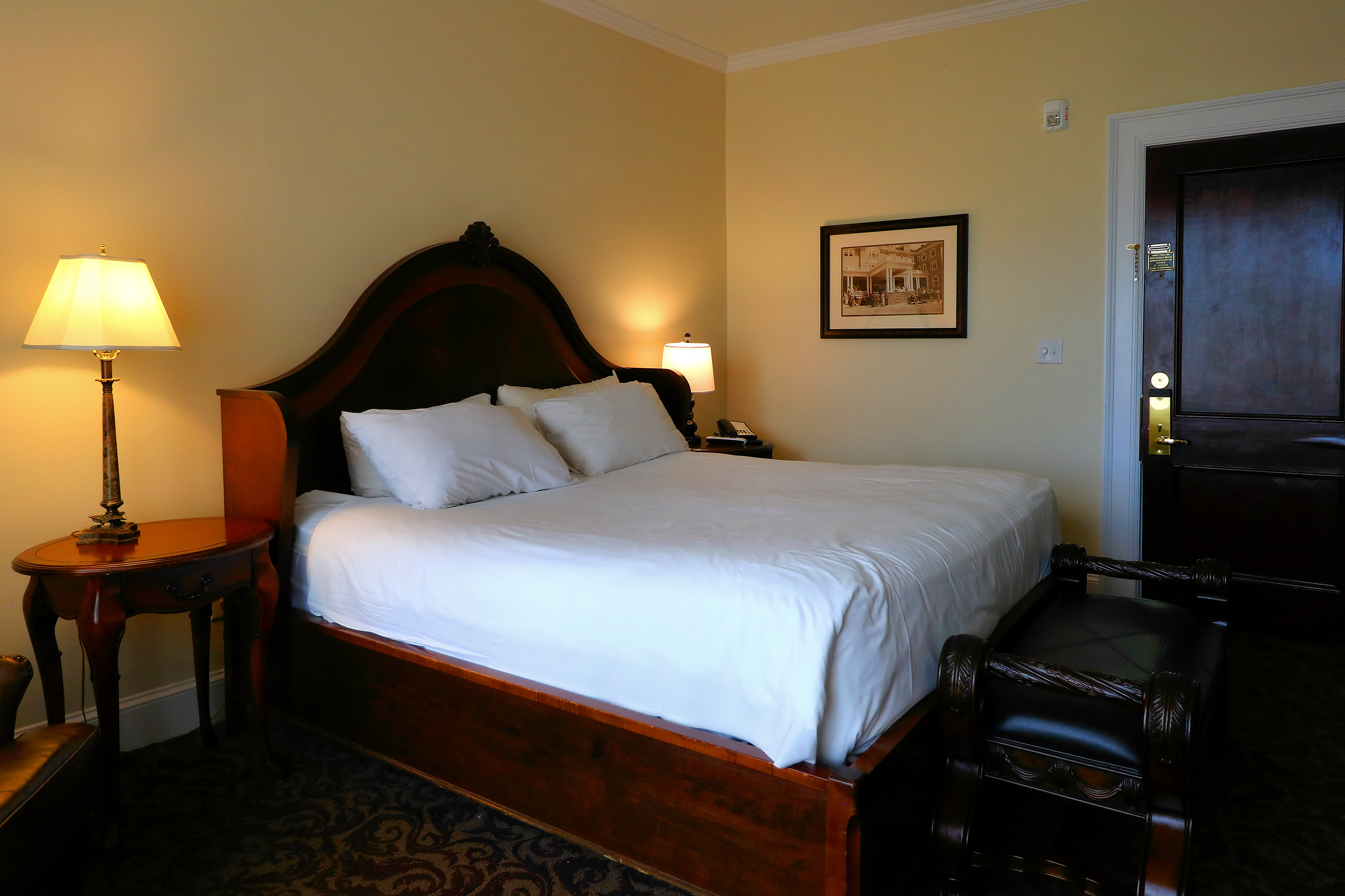
Interior of a guest room

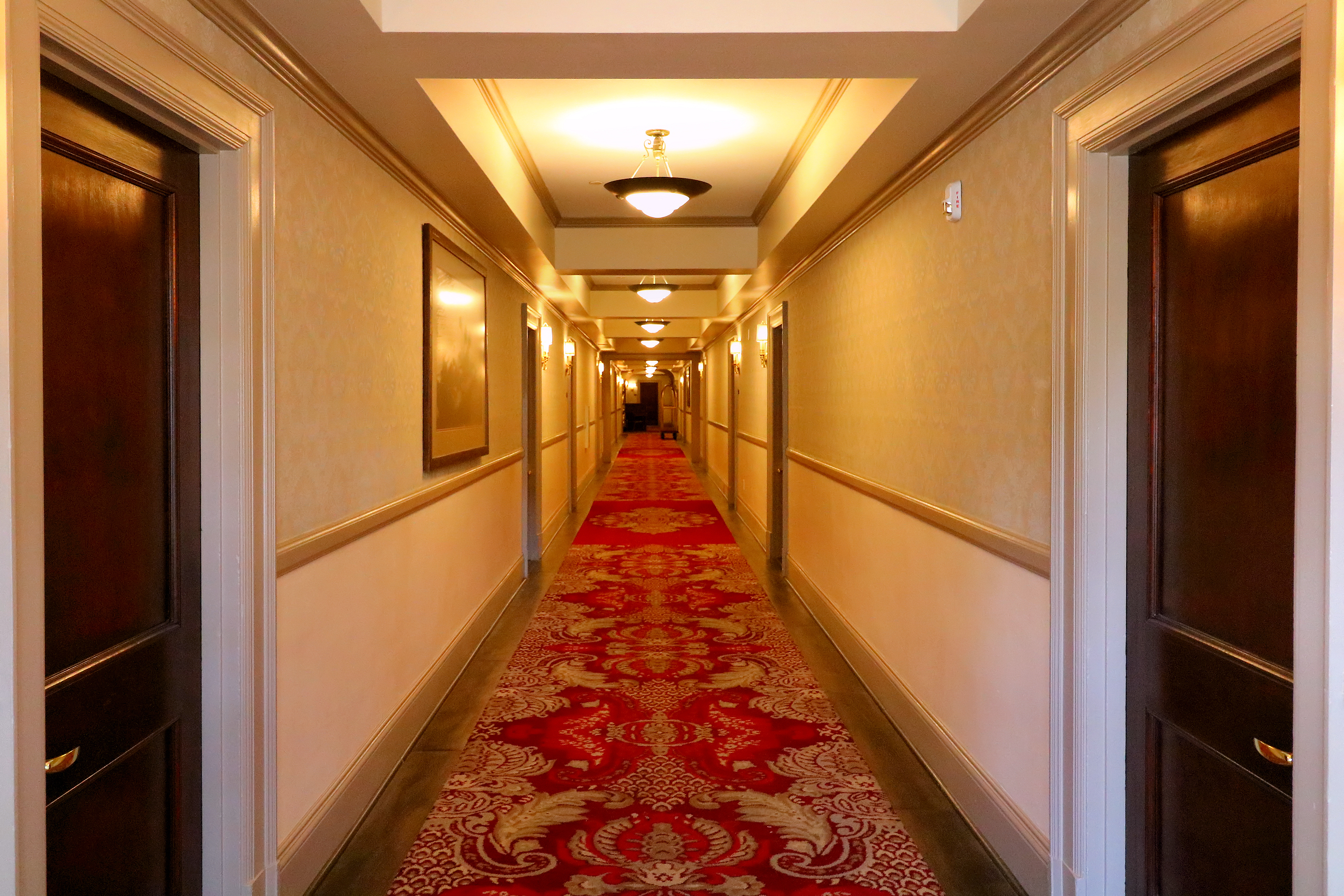
Corridor leading to guest rooms

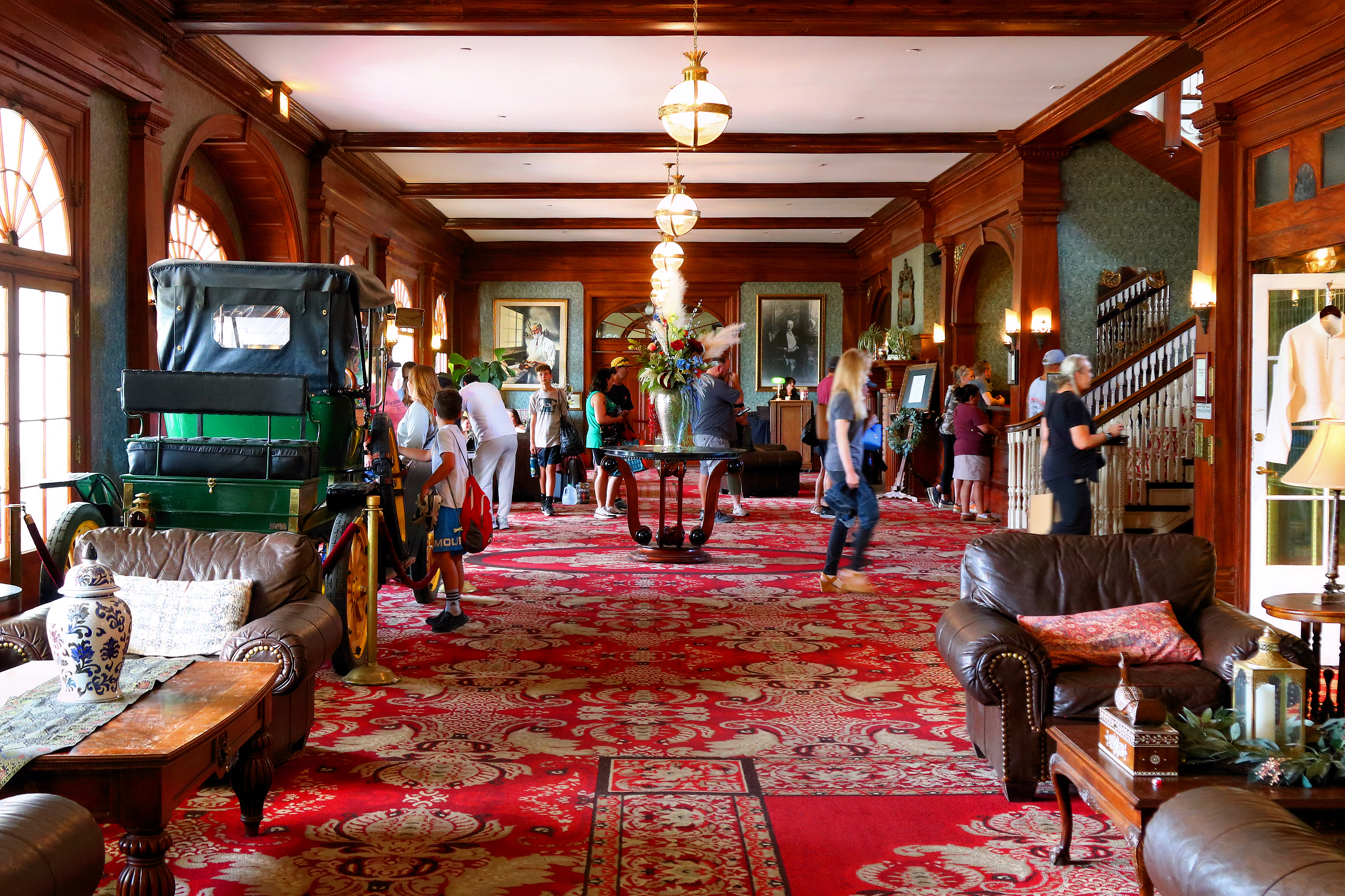
Hotel lobby

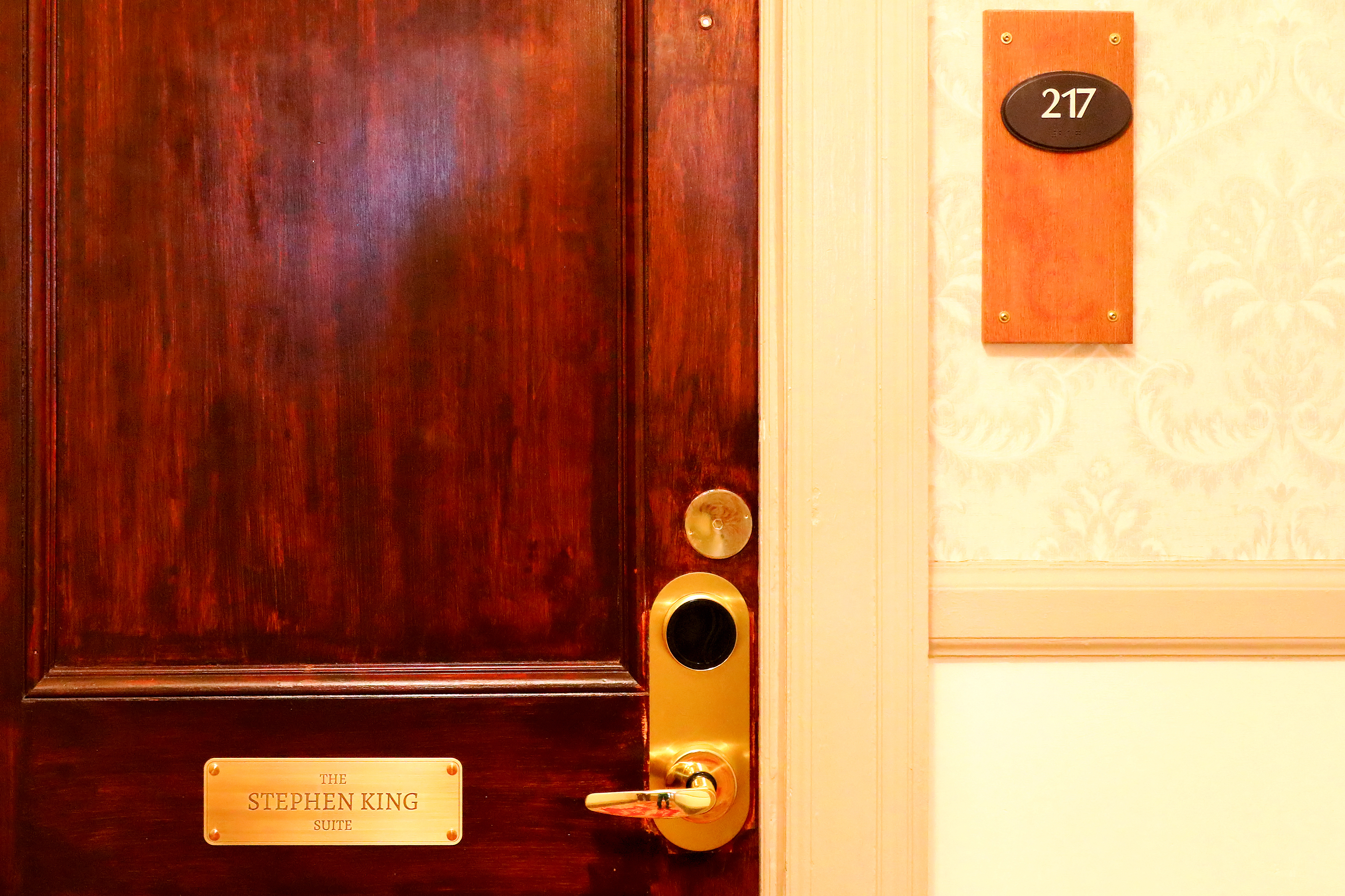
Door to the Stephen King suite

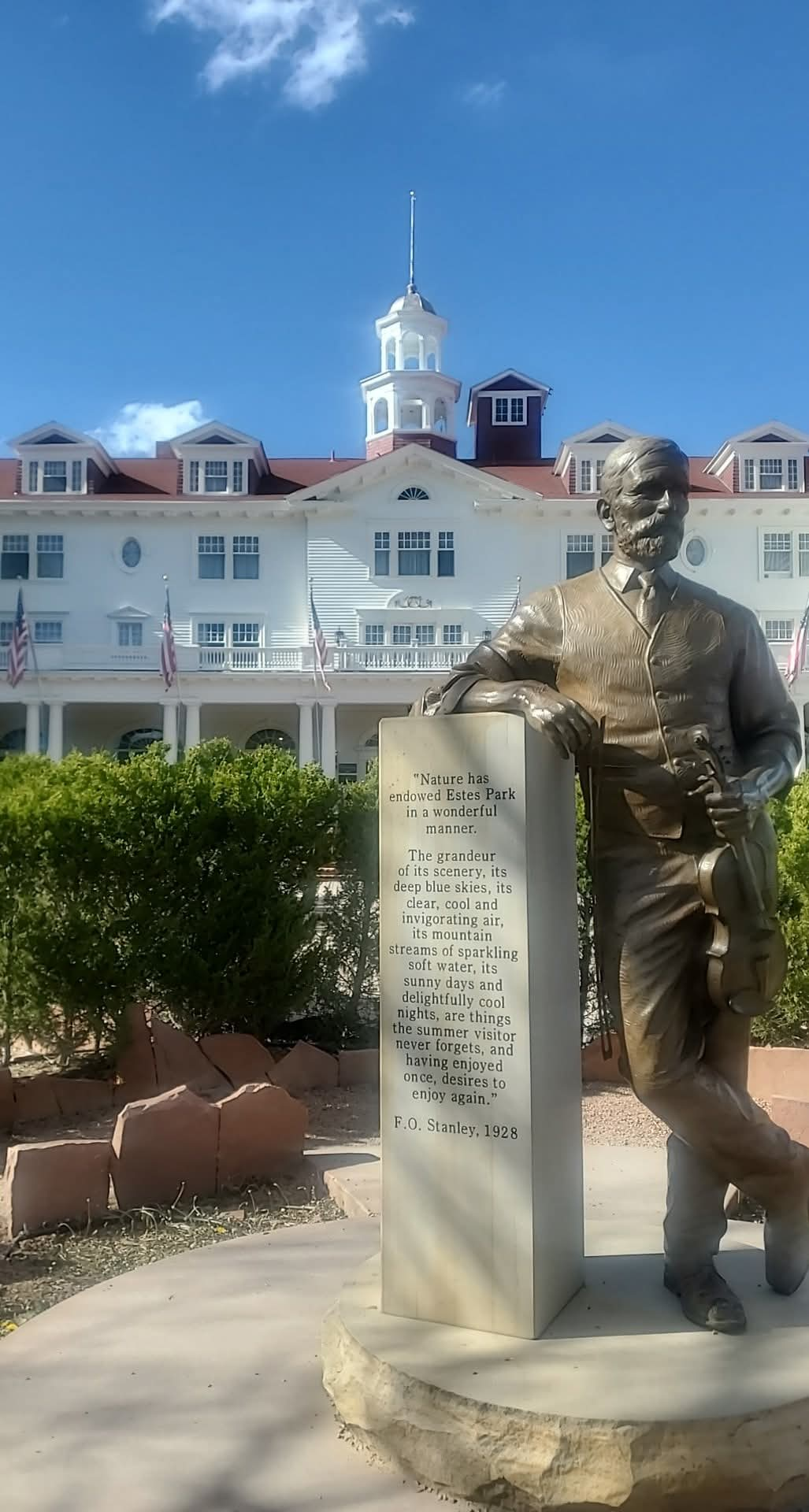
Statue of F.O. Stanley in front of the Stanley Hotel.

== Architecture ==
The Stanley Hotel National Register Historic District contains 11 contributing structures including the main hotel, the concert hall, a carriage house, manager's cottage, gate house and The Lodge – a smaller bed-and-breakfast originally called The Manor House. The buildings were designed by F.O. Stanley with the professional assistance of Denver architect T. Robert Wieger, Henry "Lord Cornwallis" Rogers, and contractor Frank Kirchoff. The site was chosen for its vantage overlooking the Estes valley and Long's Peak within the National Park. The main building, concert hall and Manor House are steel-frame structures on foundations of random rubble granite with clapboard siding and asphalt shingle roof. Originally, Stanley chose a yellow ocher color for the buildings' exteriors with white accents and trim. Lumber used in the structures was harvested from the areas of Bierstadt Lake and Hidden Valley in the future national park, and purchased from Kirchoff's Lumberyard in Denver and Bluff City Lumber Company of Pine Bluff, Arkansas. The granite was quarried from the Baldwin property near the confluence of Beaver Brook and the Big Thompson River. Non-local materials were brought to Lyons, Colorado by rail and thence to Estes Park by mule-drawn wagon.

Upon opening in 1909, the hotel was alleged to be one of the first in the country to be fully electrified from the lighting to the kitchens (although some fixtures could be operated with either electricity or gas). To supply his hotel with power, Stanley led the construction of the Fall River Hydroplant which also brought electricity to the town of Estes Park for the first time. Every guest room had a telephone and each pair of rooms shared an en suite bathroom with running water supplied by Black Canyon Creek, which had been dammed in 1906. Circa 1935, during Roe Emery's tenure as owner the ochre-colored siding was painted white and most of the original electro-gas fixtures were replaced.

Although the style of the hotel evokes the historical architecture of New England, the general form and layout are designed to accommodate contemporary notions of hygiene and comfort. Given Stanley's interest in architectural design and healthful living, he may have been inspired by the Carolina Hotel (built 1899–1900) in Pinehurst, North Carolina, designed by Bertrand E. Taylor (1856–1909) – a national leader in hospital design and, like Stanley, a resident of Newton, Massachusetts. The parallels between the Carolina and the Stanley extend beyond style; the builder of the Carolina, James Walker Tufts, was a Boston soda magnate who initially developed Pinehurst as a health resort for people with pulmonary diseases. Whether or not Stanley had exposure to Taylor's work and ideas, it is certain that he was influenced by Dr. Sherman Grant Bonney of the University of Denver, a contemporary expert in the treatment of tuberculosis; Stanley's Estes Park summer house is illustrated in Bonney's book, Pulmonary Tuberculosis (published while the hotel was under construction), and Stanley himself is acknowledged in the preface for his "interest and efficiency in connection with the photographic illustrations." Although the hotel never operated as a sanitarium per se, it was designed to be an optimal environment for pulmonary health. When the construction plans were announced, the Fort Collins Weekly Courier reported, "[Estes Park] has been a favorite place for doctors to send the more robust of their patients, who were in shape to be braced up by the keen air and the considerable altitude, but it has not always been possible to get suitable accommodations and surroundings for them. With the park turned into a vast pleasure ground, and ample provisions for the best food products, all precious objections will be dissipated." Accordingly, the facilities were sited and designed to meet the requirements expounded in Bonney's book. For instance, according to Bonney,

"An ideal site for a sanitarium, or, in fact, for all buildings designed especially for pulmonary invalids, should be upon the southern slope of a hill or near the base of a moderately high mountain. In order to afford shelter from the prevailing winds, the building should be located according to regional weather conditions either to the east or the west of a spur extending southward. It is still more advantageous if the mountain rises to a considerable distance in the far background, even to a height of several hundred feet ... The soil should be dry, porous and sandy although a rocky formation is not undesirable. On account of the necessity of irrigation in dry climates, no elaborate attempt should be made to beautify the grounds by laying out expansive lawns or by disposing flower-gardens in the immediate vicinity of the sanitarium, although such ornamentation adds greatly to the attractiveness of the institution. Undoubted benefit accrues to the invalid from a pleasing landscape. Attractive views, combining land and sky effect, contribute to a remarkable degree in breaking an unceasing monotony. Definite inspiration and elevation of spirits are not infrequently afforded by the sublimity of scenic grandeur witnessed in mountain resorts."

This text is accompanied by a photograph of "the delightful view afforded from the porches of cottages for consumptives in Estes Park, Colorado." The hotel also provided the ample porches, ventilation, southern exposure, and appetizing food recommended in Bonney's book.

The style of the Stanley Hotel campus is Colonial Revival. The strong symmetrical arrangement of the primary facade, and the classically derived ornamental articulations such as the two-stage octagonal cupola, Palladian window, fanlights, dormers, swan's neck pediments, scroll brackets, paired Tuscan columns, oval ox-eye windows, and elaborately turned balusters are all stylistic hallmarks of the so-called American Georgian and Federal Styles. The clapboard siding and carved wood elements are characteristic of New England's regional building practices. And yet, these features are modified and arranged to accommodate the tastes and lifestyles of the early twentieth century.

The style of the hotel contrasts sharply with the rustic style used for the other hotels in Estes Park, before and after the Stanley's construction. However, it was not an uncommon choice for a hotel of the Stanley's size and quality in the time period (e.g. Royal Poinciana Hotel, Lake Yellowstone Hotel, Mount Washington Hotel). In general, the Colonial Revival symbolized the historical roots of modern American cultural values and the positive progress of American civilization. By this token, the Stanley Hotel was an expression of the modest gentility of the builder and his clientele, an advertisement for the modern comforts contained within it, and a beacon for the future of Estes Park as a respectable resort town. All of these connotations were heightened in contrast with the ruggedness of the Rocky Mountains and the rusticity of the other hotels in the area.

=== Main building ===
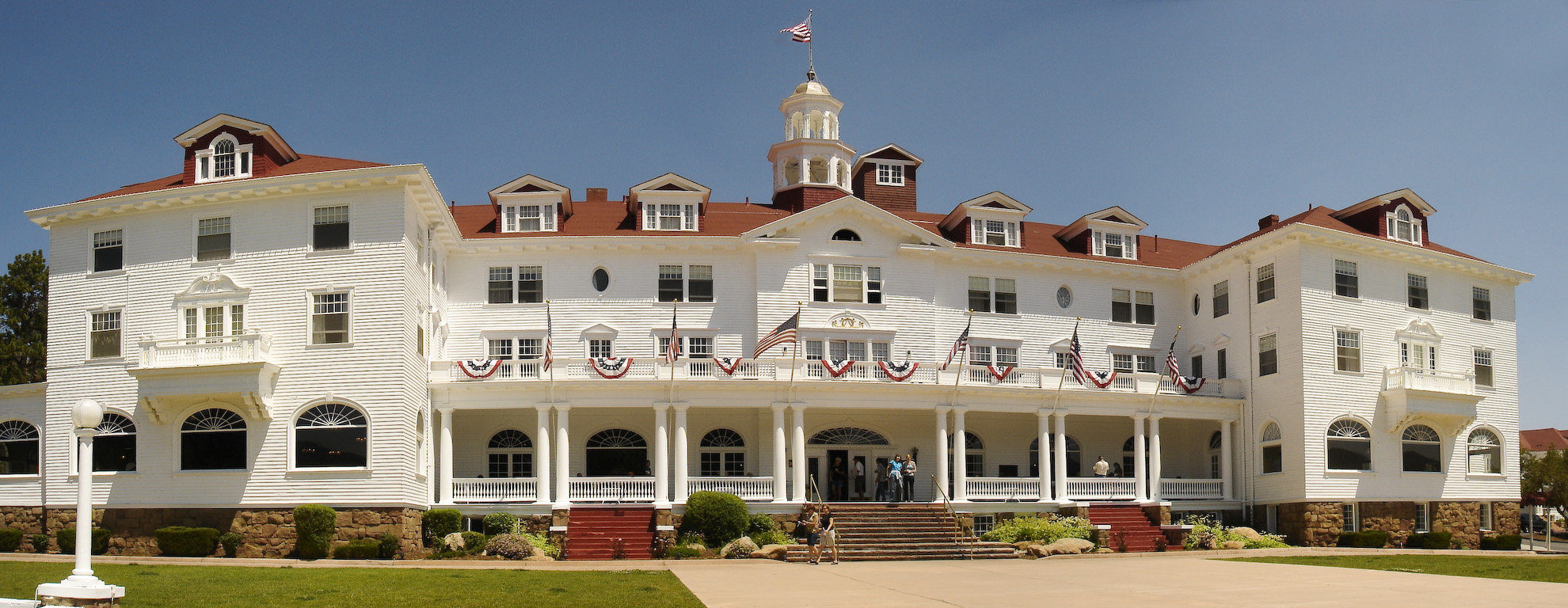
Stanley Hotel Main Building

The floor plan of the main hotel (completed 1909) was laid out to accommodate the various activities popular with the American upper class at the turn of the twentieth century and the spaces are decorated accordingly. The music room, for instance, with its cream-colored walls (originally green and white), picture windows and fine, classical plaster-work was designed for letter-writing during the day and chamber music at night – cultured pursuits perceived as feminine. On the other hand, the smoking lounge (today the Piñon Room) and adjoining billiard room, with their dark stained-wood elements and granite arch fireplace were designated for enjoyment by male guests. Stanley himself, having been raised in a conservative household and having recovered from a serious lung disease, did not smoke cigars or drink alcohol, but these were essential after-dinner activities for most men at the time. Billiards, however, was among Stanley's most cherished pastimes.

With no central heating or ventilation system, the structure was designed to facilitate natural airflow; the Palladian window at the top of the grand stair could be opened to induce a cross-breeze through the lobby, French doors in all the public spaces open onto verandas, and two curving staircases connecting the guest corridors prevent stagnant air in the upper floors. Although the main hotel is now heated in the winter, guests still depend on natural ventilation for cooling in the summer. Within a few years of opening, a hydraulic elevator was put in operation. In 1916, the east wing of the main building was extended in the rear adding several guest rooms. Around this time, the alcove of the music room was added. In 1921, a rear veranda was enclosed forming a room that currently serves as a gift shop. Around 1935, the hydraulic elevator system was replaced with a cable-operated system and extended to the fourth floor necessitating the addition of a secondary cupola to house the mechanical apparatus. Originally, a porte-cochère extended from the central bay of the front porch, but this was removed when the south terrace was converted into a parking lot. In 1983, a service tunnel was excavated, connecting the basement-level corridor to the staff entrance. It is cut directly through the living granite on which the hotel rests.

=== Concert hall ===
The concert hall, east of the hotel, was built by Stanley in 1909 with the assistance of Henry "Lord Cornwallis" Rogers, the same architect who designed his summer cottage. According to popular legend, it was built by F.O. Stanley as a gift for his wife, Flora. The interior is decorated in the same manner as the music room in the main hotel and vaguely resembles that of the Boston Symphony Hall (McKim, Mead & White, 1900) with which the Stanleys would have been familiar. The stage features a trap door, used for theatrical entrances and exits. The lower level once housed a two-lane bowling alley which was removed during the ownership of Maxwell Abbell. It possibly resembled the bowling alley at the Stanley's Hunnewell Club in Newton, pictures of which are archived in the Newton Free Library. The hall underwent extensive repair and renovation in the 2000s.

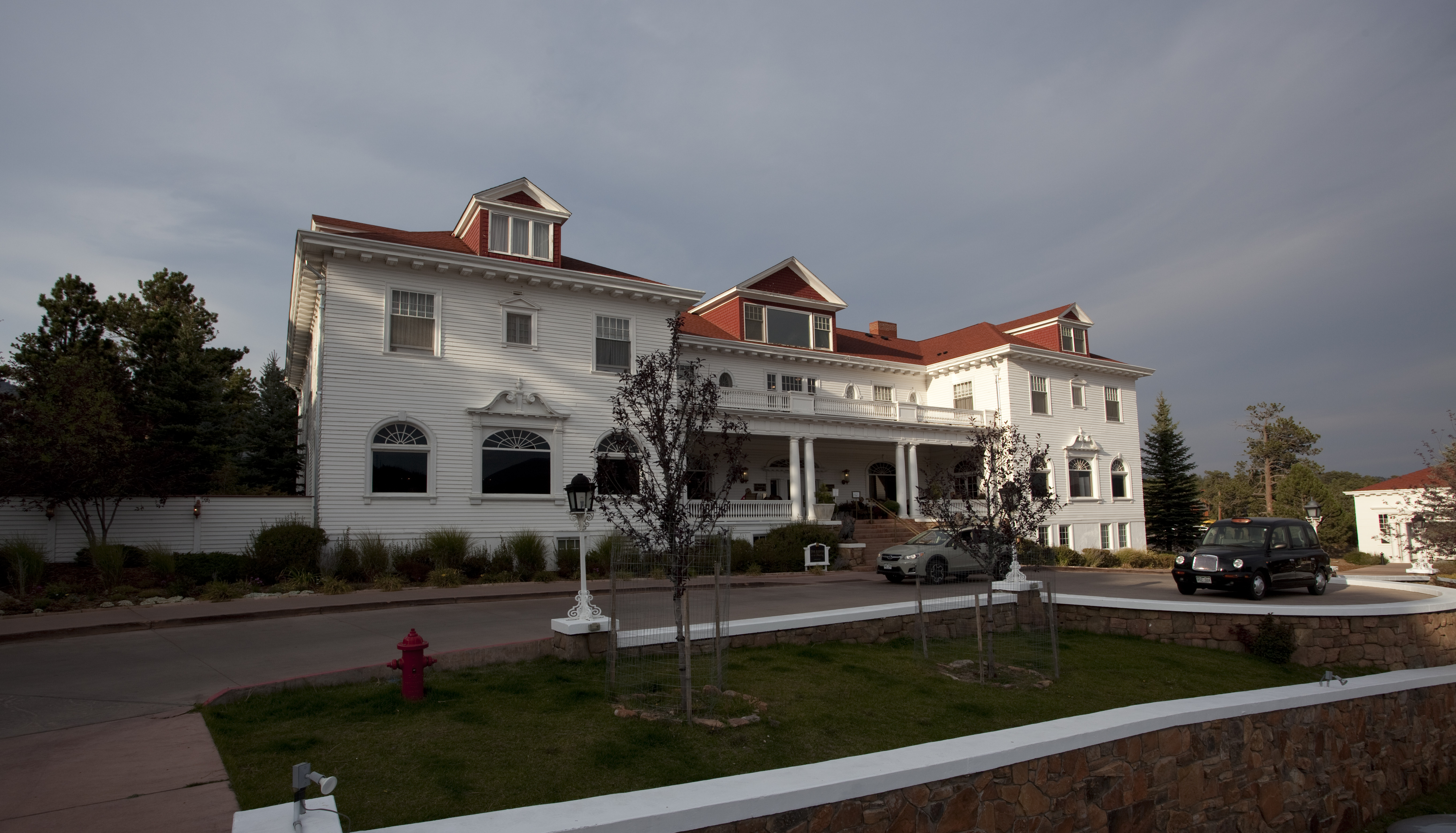
The Lodge at the Stanley Hotel

=== The Lodge ===
Once called The Manor House, this smaller hotel between the main structure and the concert hall is a 1:3 scaled-down version of the main hotel. Unlike its model, the manor was fully heated from completion in 1910 which may indicate that Stanley planned to use it as a winter resort when the main building was closed for the season. However, unlike many other Colorado mountain towns now famous for their winter sports, Estes Park never attracted off-season visitors in Stanley's day and the manor remained empty for much of the year. Today it is called The Lodge and it features a brunch restaurant and is open to guests as another location to stay on the property.

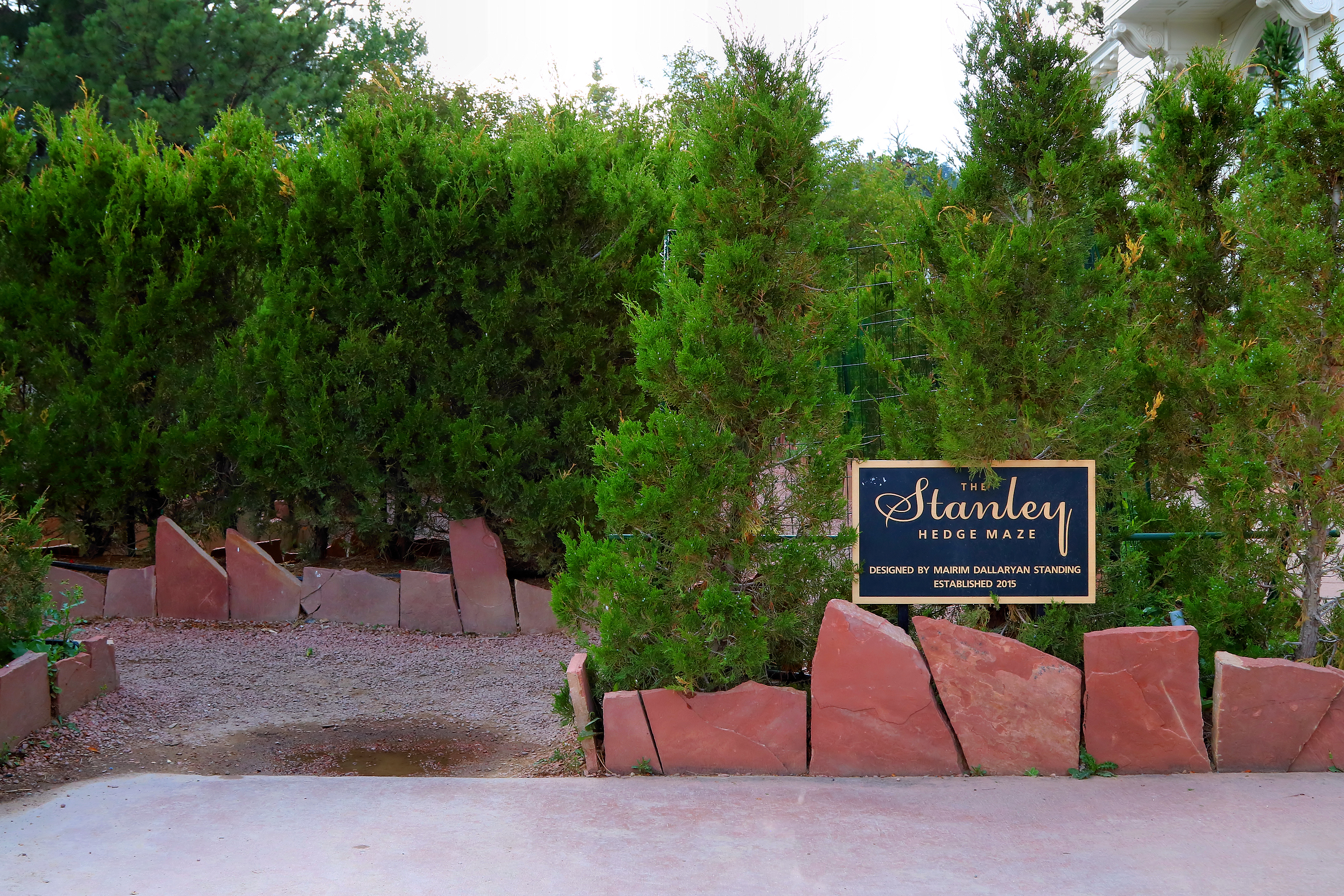
Hedge Maze Stanley Hotel

=== Hedge Maze ===
The terrace in front of the hotel atop the semi-circular retaining wall originally served as a driveway for steam-powered mountain wagons bringing guests to and from the hotel. In 1983, the area was converted to a parking lot. Around 1995, it was converted to a lawn and event area. In 2015, a hedge maze was built in this spot honoring the one seen in Stanley Kubrick's film version of The Shining. Ironically, Stephen King's The Shining features topiary animals instead of a hedge maze.

== The Shining ==
In 1974, during their brief residency in Boulder, Colorado, American horror writer Stephen King and his wife Tabitha spent one night at the Stanley Hotel. The visit is known entirely through interviews given by King in which he presents differing narratives of the experience. According to George Beahm's Stephen King Companion, "on the advisement of locals who suggested a resort hotel located in Estes Park, an hour's drive away to the north, Stephen and Tabitha King found themselves checking in at the Stanley Hotel just as its other guests were checking out, because the hotel was shutting down for the winter season. After checking in and after Tabitha went to bed, King roamed the halls and went down to the hotel bar, where drinks were served by a bartender named Grady. Later, when King went into the bathroom and pulled back the pink curtain for the tub, which had claw feet, he thought, 'What if somebody died here? At that moment, I knew I had a book.'"

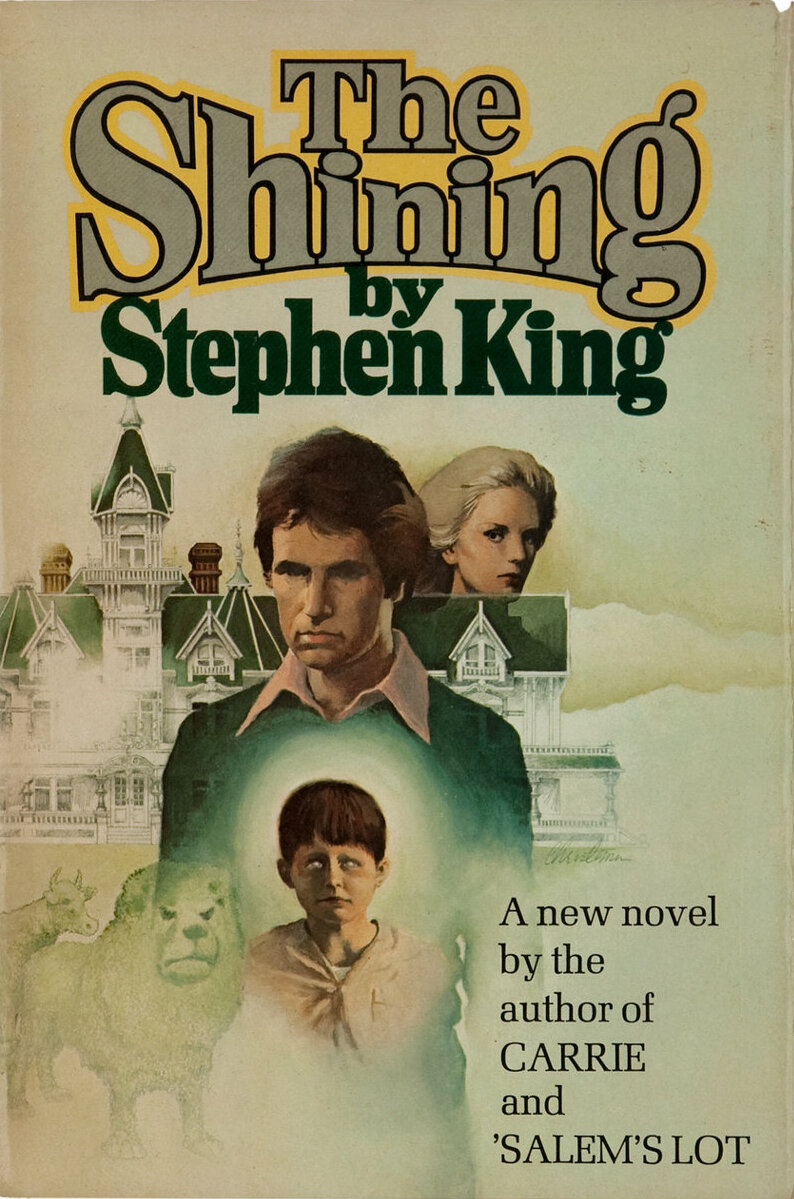
The Shining (1977) front cover

In a 1977 interview by the Literary Guild, King recounted "While we were living [in Boulder] we heard about this terrific old mountain resort hotel and decided to give it a try. But when we arrived, they were just getting ready to close for the season, and we found ourselves the only guests in the place – with all those long, empty corridors." King and his wife were served dinner in an empty dining room accompanied by canned orchestral music: "Except for our table all the chairs were up on the tables. So the music is echoing down the hall, and, I mean, it was like God had put me there to hear that and see those things. And by the time I went to bed that night, I had the whole book [The Shining] in my mind." In another retelling, King said "I dreamed of my three-year-old son running through the corridors, looking back over his shoulder, eyes wide, screaming. He was being chased by a fire-hose. I woke up with a tremendous jerk, sweating all over, within an inch of falling out of bed. I got up, lit a cigarette, sat in a chair looking out the window at the Rockies, and by the time the cigarette was done, I had the bones of The Shining firmly set in my mind."

The Shining was published in 1977 and became the third great success of King's career after Carrie and 'Salem's Lot. The primary setting is an isolated Colorado resort named the Overlook Hotel which closes for the winter. In the front matter of the book, King tactfully states "Some of the most beautiful resort hotels in the world are located in Colorado, but the hotel in these pages is based on none of them. The Overlook and the people associated with it exist wholly in the author's imagination."

Room 217 at the Overlook Hotel features significantly in The Shining. The room with the same number at the Stanley is alleged to have been the one offered to Stephen King during his 1974 stay.

== Film location and venue ==
The Stanley Hotel served as the fictional hotel and filming location for Danbury of Aspen, Colorado, in the 1994 film Dumb and Dumber.

The Shining, a three-part miniseries and horror tv-adaptation, was written and produced by Stephen King, based on his 1977 novel of the same name. The idea for the novel had been conceived from a nightmare King had while staying at the hotel in room 217. The miniseries was produced by King, who had been dissatisfied with Stanley Kubrick's 1980 film. Unlike Kubrick's version, the miniseries, directed by Mick Garris, was filmed at the Stanley Hotel, which stood in for the fictional "Overlook Hotel", located in the Colorado Rockies. Film production started in March 1996, with the first episode being released in March 1997.

From 2013 to 2015, the hotel hosted the Stanley Film Festival, an independent horror film festival, operated by the Denver Film Society, held in early May. The festival featured screenings, panels, student competitions, audience awards and receptions. The Stanley Film Festival was put on hiatus in 2016 and canceled for 2017.

Bravo's cooking competition Top Chef also used the Stanley as a venue for Episode 10 of Season 15, which took place in various locations around Colorado.

Indie rock band Murder by Death have performed an annual series of winter concerts at the Stanley Hotel since 2014, with the 2020 edition being their seventh such event.

== Haunted reputation ==
Despite a peaceful early history, in recent decades, thanks to The Shining, the Stanley Hotel has gained a reputation as a setting for paranormal activity. It has hosted numerous paranormal investigators and appeared in shows such as Ghost Hunters and Ghost Adventures.

Room 217

Stephen King spent the night in this room where he had the dream that created The Shining, however on June 25th, 1911 an incident much greater took place that started the room's haunted reputation. The hotel's power had gone out after a flood; Freelan Stanley wanted his guests to have a source of light so he gave each room a gas-powered lantern. There was a gas leak in room 217, causing an explosion when head chambermaid Elizabeth Wilson lit a candle after walking into the room. Wilson survived the explosion, which is said to have made a bathtub fly through the air. Elizabeth Wilson returned to work at the Stanley, but after she died guests said that her spirit still encompassed the room, saying that when they woke for the day their room was cleaner than when they fell asleep, their clothes folded, and suitcases organized. Married couples tend to have a mostly peaceful stay where the spirits are only cleaning up the space around them but unmarried couples have reported a cold and chilling being coming into bed next to them as they have slept.

Fourth Floor

Guests who visit the fourth floor have reported hearing the sounds of children running around and laughing but when they go to look for the source of the noise no one is there. There are also claims of objects moving around the halls as if kids are playing but again when guests look for the source there is nothing there.

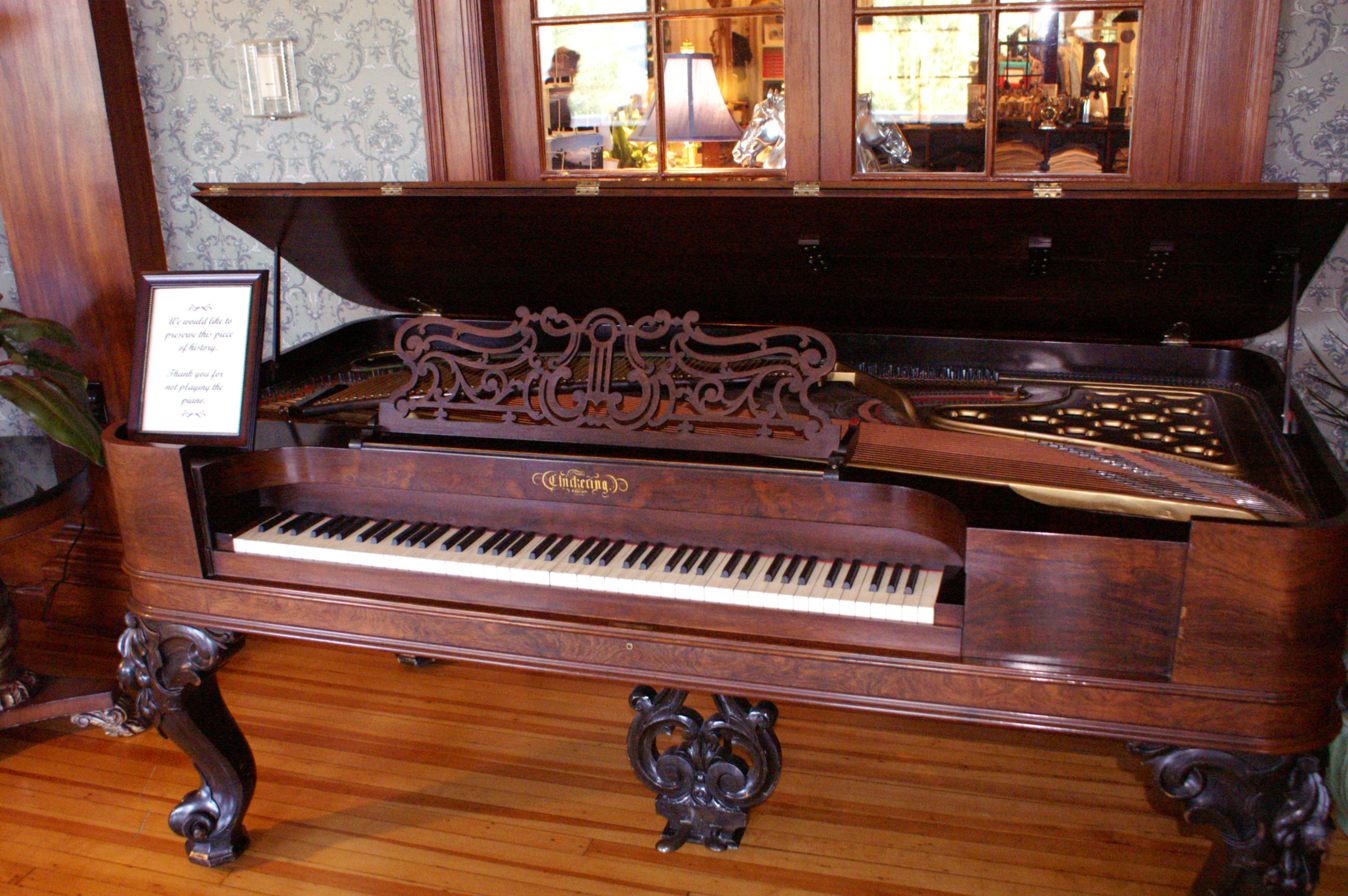
Picture of piano in the Stanley Hotel Piano Room

Death of Stanley and His Wife

Freelan Oscar Stanley died on October 2, 1940 and has left his presence at the hotel. Guests claim that they can feel and sometimes see his aura, especially in spaces like the billiards room and bar. His wife Flora’s presence has been claimed to be felt lingering around the Stanley's piano room.

== Famous guests ==
The Stanley Hotel has hosted the following persons of note:

- 1925, Wilhelm Backhaus, the German pianist
- 1934, Erich Fromm, the German psychoanalyst
- 1936, Gov. Alf Landon (R, Kansas) while running for president against Franklin Delano Roosevelt
- 1973, Judy Collins, Michael Nesmith, Shel Silverstein, Bobby Womack and Joseph Banks Rhine at the Carnival of Knowledge
- 1974, Stephen King, author who was inspired to write The Shining after his stay in room 217
- 1976, Bob Dylan and Joan Baez, folk revival icons during the Rolling Thunder Revue tour
- 1987, Clive Cussler, Scott Carpenter, and Will Steger at The Explorers Club meeting
- 1994, Emperor Akihito of Japan, Empress Michiko and Crown Prince Naruhito, on a state visit to the U.S.
- 1994, Dumb and Dumber cast and crew including Jim Carrey and Jeff Daniels
- 1996, The Shining miniseries cast and crew including Rebecca De Mornay and Steven Weber

== Ownership history ==
- 1908–1926, Freelan Oscar Stanley
- 1926–1929, The Stanley Corporation
- 1929–1930, Freelan Oscar Stanley
- 1930–1946, Roe Emery
- 1946–1966, Abbell Management Company (later Abbell Hotel Company), run by Maxwell Abbell, Chicago real estate investor
- 1966–1969, Stanley Properties, Inc., headed by Maurice L. Albertson, civil engineer at Colorado State University
- 1969–1974, Richard R. Holechek, Charles F. Hanson and Carol Hanson Pick of Riverside and Palm Springs, California
- 1974–1995, Frank Normali (Complete Restoration Period): Spent his ownership period restoring the Stanley Hotel in which he added heat into the main building and a sprinkler system throughout primary buildings. He was able to buy back old furniture the hotel had lost as well as brought back theater and the arts to the hotel.
- 1995–2025, Grand Heritage Hotel Group
- 2025–present, The Stanley Partnership for Art Culture and Education: Announced a $60 million, three year project in which the nature that the Stanley Hotel was built on is preserved but also expanded upon. The project will build 64 rooms, a new lobby, and port cochere.

== See also ==
- List of Historic Hotels of America
