= Grand Lake Lodge =

- U.S. National Register of Historic Places
- U.S. Historic district
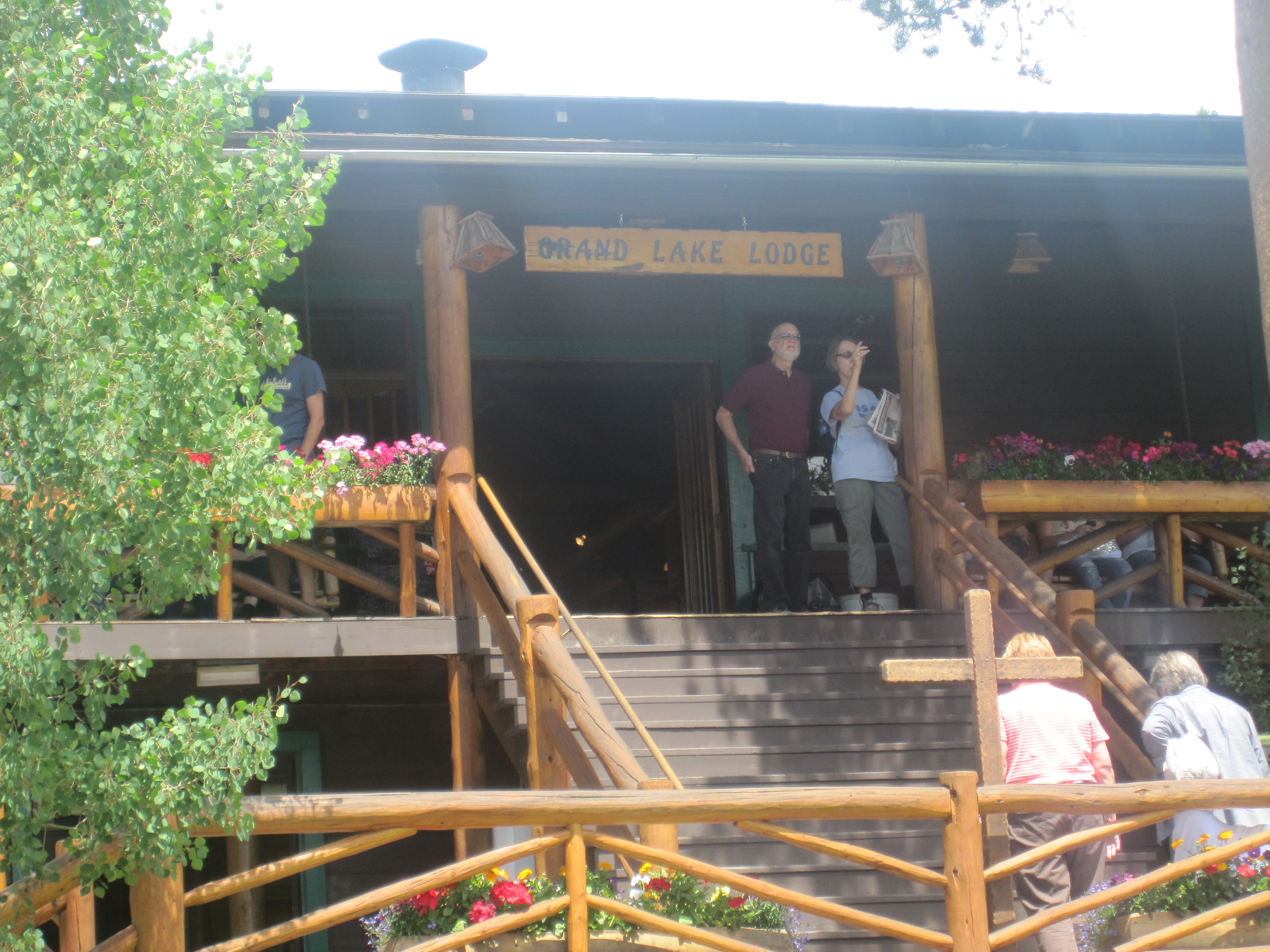
- People on the lodge's steps

- Location within Colorado Location within the United States
- Location: 15500 US 34, Grand Lake, Colorado
- Coordinates: 40°15′27″N 105°49′30″W
- Architect: Franklin I. Huntington
- NRHP reference No.: 93000663
- Added to NRHP: July 22, 1993

The Grand Lake Lodge hotel was opened in 1920 to serve tourists visiting Rocky Mountain National Park via the Trail Ridge Road, completed the same year. Located in Grand Lake, Colorado, the rustic lodge was founded by Frank Huntington and Roe Emery on land owned by the National Park Service at the edge of the park. The resort was affiliated with the Chicago, Burlington & Quincy Railroad.

A kitchen fire in 1973 closed the lodge for the next seven seasons. After extensive reconstruction and refurnishing, the lodge reopened in 1981. The lodge and its historic district comprise more than 100 structures, including several smaller lodges and many rustic cabins. In 2018, Highway West Vacations purchased the Grand Lake Lodge and began a complete renovation to all the guest cabins, hotel lobby, restaurant and bar. Renovation was completed in May 2019 for the Summer season.

== See also ==
- National Register of Historic Places listings in Grand County, Colorado
