= Roe Emery =

American businessman

Lereaux "Roe" William Emery (October 31, 1874 in Lake City, Minnesota – February 4, 1953) was an American businessman who owned many transportation companies and lodges, and expanded tourism into the National Parks. Roe Emery was known as "the Father of Colorado Tourism".

Emery raised sheep in White Sulfur Springs, Montana. In 1914, he was one of two principals of the Glacier National Park tour buses called Red Jammers, the first authorized motor vehicles in the National Park system. The Grand Lake Lodge, built in 1920, was purchased by Emery in 1923 and was the start of lodging acquisitions, becoming a stop on his Rocky Mountains Circle Tours. He owned The Stanley Hotel from 1930 to 1946.

Emery was president of the National Western Stock Show.

Emery's son, Walt Emery, was part of the family business and later was a co-founder of the Denver Broncos. His grandson was Mark Udall, a United States Senator from Colorado.
