= Fred Marriott =

American race car driver

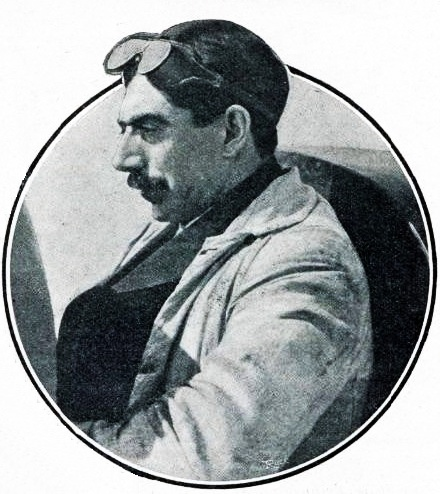
Fred Marriott 1906

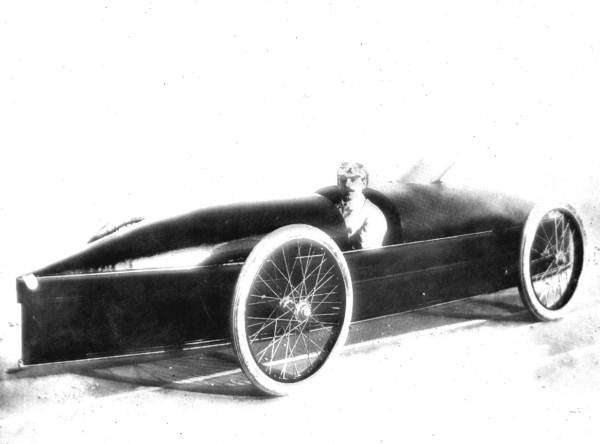
Fred Marriott and the Stanley Rocket

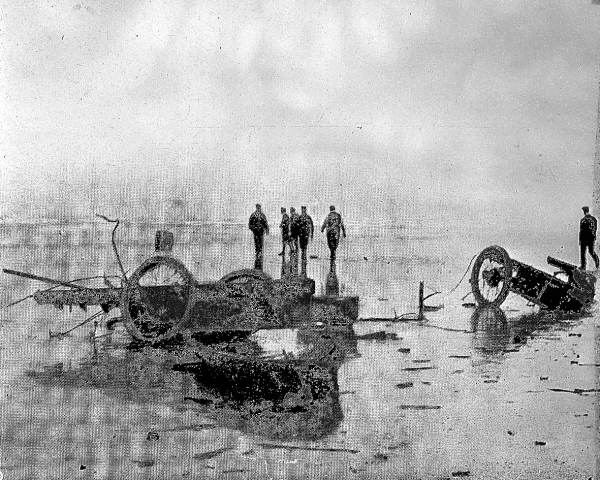
The demolished "Rocket" Stanley Steamer (1907)

Fred Marriott (31 December 1872, Needham, Massachusetts - 28 April 1956) was an American race car driver. In 1906, he set the world land speed record at 127.659 mph (205.5 km/h) at the Daytona Beach Road Course, while driving the Stanley Land Speed Record Car. This garnered Stanley Motor Carriage Company the Dewar Trophy. A crew of four accompanied the car to Daytona, Marriott was chosen to be driver because he was the only bachelor.

An attempt to break the record at Daytona in 1907 used an improved version of the car but the car hit a rut at an estimated speed of 140-150 mph. The car sailed in the air, breaking in half upon impact: Marriott was injured and did not make another attempt to break the record after he recovered.

Marriott's mark for the steam land speed record, which had become the longest-standing such record, was finally broken more than 100 years later in August 2009 when Charles Burnett III of the British "Inspiration" team recorded an average speed of 139.843 mph (225.06 km/h) at Edwards Air Force Base in California.
