= Francis Edgar Stanley =

American businessman (1849–1918)

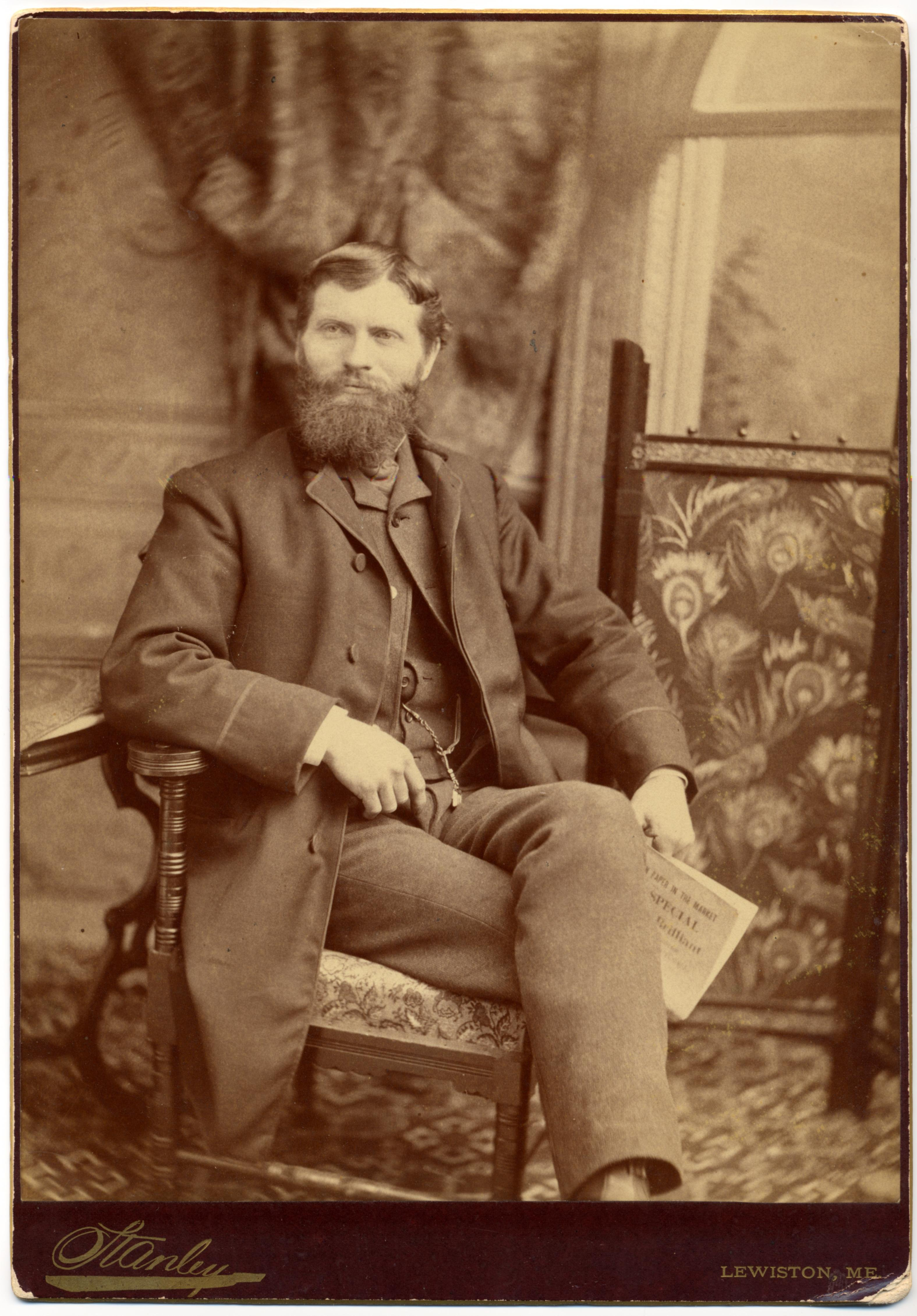
- Stanley in c. 1882
- Born: June 1, 1849; Kingfield, Maine, US
- Died: July 31, 1918 (aged 69); Wenham, Massachusetts, US
- Education: Western State Normal School
- Occupation: Businessman
- Known for: Stanley Steamer
- Relatives: Freelan Oscar Stanley (twin brother)

Signature
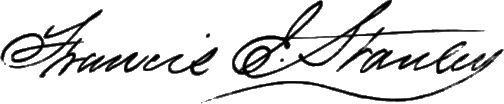

Francis Edgar Stanley (June 1, 1849 – July 31, 1918) was an American businessman and was the co-founder, along with his twin brother Freelan Oscar Stanley, of the Stanley Motor Carriage Company which built the Stanley Steamer.

== Biography ==
He and his twin brother, Freelan Oscar Stanley (otherwise known as Free, or more often Freelan) learned to carve violins as taught by their grandfather, Liberty Stanley, at the age of ten. He attended Western State Normal School, now known as the University of Maine at Farmington. While Freelan initially became a teacher, Francis took a different path, moving to Lewiston, Maine and opening a photography studio in 1874. Within a few years, the studio was one of the largest in New England, and his twin brother eventually joined him in the business. During that time, Francis patented the first photographic airbrush, which he used to colorize photos.

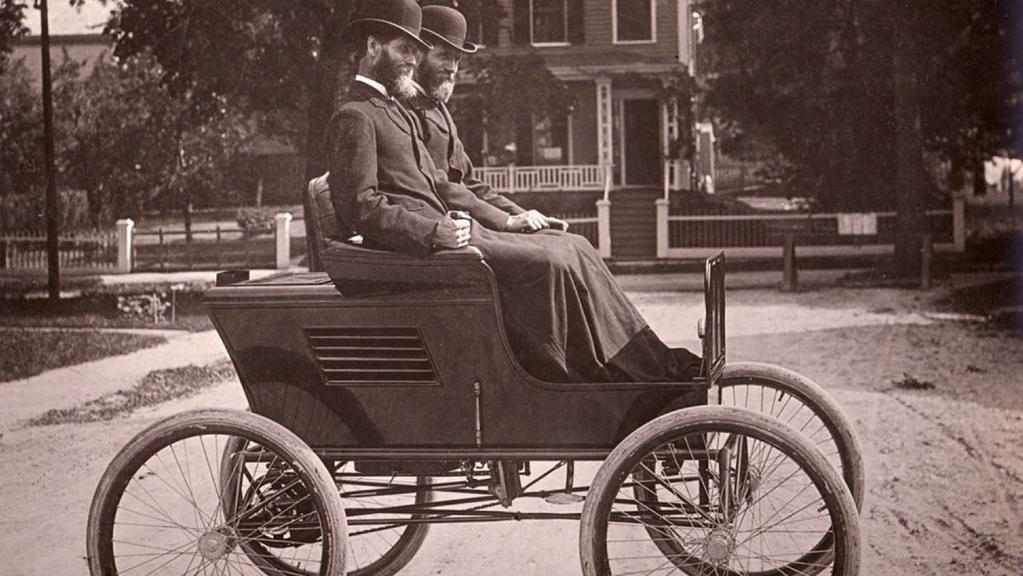
The Stanley Brothers in one of their steam cars circa 1898

Several years later, they were dissatisfied with the quality of the dry plates that at the time were entering major use in the industry. They patented a machine for coating mass quantities of dry plates, and set up the Stanley Dry Plate Company Watertown, Massachusetts (the company was later moved to Rochester, New York). By the 1890s, that business had over $1 million in annual sales. However, the brothers abandoned photography when they became interested in automobile development, and sold the dry plate business to George Eastman of Eastman-Kodak for $500,000. However, the family's connection to photography continued with the career of the Stanley twins' younger sister, Chansonetta Stanley Emmons. The Stanley Motor Carriage Company, the next business venture of the brothers, was a steam car manufacturing company based in Newton, Massachusetts. It was founded in 1897 by Francis and Freelan Stanley. The brothers designed their first car that very year, which became a hit among the wealthy automobile enthusiasts. A Stanley steam car, the "Rocket", achieved the land speed record in 1906, at 127.6 mph.

He died in 1918 in Wenham, Massachusetts when he drove his car into a woodpile while attempting to avoid farm wagons travelling side by side on the road.

== See also ==
- Freelan Oscar Stanley
