= Buckhorn, Colorado =

Ghost town in Larimer County, Colorado, United States

- ghost town
- Location of Buckhorn, Colorado. Buckhorn (Colorado)
- Coordinates: 40.50°N 105.24°W
- Country: United States
- State: Colorado
- County: Larimer County
- Elevation: 5,605 ft (1,708 m)
- Time zone: UTC−07:00 (MST)
  - Summer (DST): UTC−06:00 (MDT)

Buckhorn is a ghost town in Larimer County, Colorado, United States, 5 miles (8.0 km) south of Masonville, and located along Buckhorn Creek.

== History ==
Settlers of Buckhorn drove cattle on the land and cut down trees. They lived in simple cabins or hillside dugout huts. The Buckhorn, Colorado, post office operated from August 2, 1878, until August 18, 1888. Described about 1880 "to be in extremely backward condition", it was subject to mountain lions, rattlesnakes, and flooding of Buckhorn Creek. Lewis Kern, the county assessor, stated the same year that settlers were doing well and flourishing.

G.W. Buffum and Albert Yule lived in Buckhorn by 1878. Yule was a rancher and a farmer of corn. Ben Milner and his wife Rose Rosebroook moved to Buckhorn in 1881 and established a ranch there. His widowed sister, Sarah Milner Smith and her children homesteaded and operated a ranch on the land. They were two of about six families who first settled Buckhorn. Sarah's sons Edward and Eugene Smith worked her ranch and established ranches in the Buckhorn area. Eugene Smith wrote the book Pioneer Epic about his life with his mother in Buckhorn.

The "Milner brothers" (Note: Milner brothers were not Eugene and Edward who were children at the time. It is likely Sarah's brothers, Ben, James, and Joseph.) and other prospectors mined for gold at Buckhorn by 1880. Iron was also found at Buckhorn by May 1889.

The Union ditch, also called the Buckhorn Highline Ditch, was built to irrigate the land. The site is at 5,607 feet (1,709 m) in altitude.

== See also ==
- Fort Collins, CO Metropolitan Statistical Area
- Front Range Urban Corridor
- List of populated places in Colorado
- List of post offices in Colorado
- Redstone Creek, tributary of Buckhorn Creek
