= Redstone =

Redstone or Red Stone may refer to:

== Military ==
- Redstone Arsenal, Alabama, a U.S. Army base
  - Redstone (rocket family), a U.S. missile and support system, named for the Arsenal
  - PGM-11 Redstone, U.S. missile and carrier rocket, namesake of the family
- USNS Redstone (T-AGM-20), a tracking/communications ship supporting the Apollo program
- Redstone Old Fort, an 18th-century military post in western Pennsylvania

== People ==
- Brent Redstone (b. c. 1951), American heir and businessman
- Michael Redstone (1902–1987), American businessman
- Peter William Redstone (1936–2016), English harpsichord maker
- Shari Redstone (b. 1954), American heiress, businesswoman, and philanthropist
- Sumner Redstone (1923–2020), American media magnate
- Vincent Burrough Redstone (1853–1941), Suffolk educationalist and historian
- Willy Redstone orig. Rottenstein (1883–1949), French composer in England and Australia
- Jeff Locke (baseball) (b. 1987), American professional baseball pitcher nicknamed "The Redstone Rocket"

== Places and structures ==
- Redstone, Colorado, a small town near Glenwood Springs
- Redstone Old Fort, a fort in Brownsville, Pennsylvania
- Redstone, New Hampshire, site of abandoned "red granite" quarry
- Redstone Building, San Francisco, California
- Redstone (Dubuque, Iowa), a historic home
- Redstone River (Mackenzie), a tributary of the Mackenzie River in the Northwest Territories, Canada
- Redstone River (Haliburton County, Ontario), flows from southern Algonquin Provincial Park to the Gull River in Ontario, Canada
- Redstone River (Northeastern Ontario), that flows from Semple Lake to its mouth at Night Hawk Lake, Ontario, Canada
- Redstone River (Alaska), a tributary to the Ambler River, in Alaska, United States
- Red Stone River (Wyoming and Montana), also known as Powder River, Wyoming and Montana, United States
- Redstone Creek (Colorado)
- Redstone Creek (Pennsylvania)
- Redstone Creek (South Dakota)
- Red Stone Creek
- Brownsville, Pennsylvania, known as "Redstone" when it was a notable 18th-century frontier town
- Redstone Township, Pennsylvania
- Redstone (Burlington, Vermont), a historic estate
- Redstone, British Columbia, a settlement in the Chilcotin District of British Columbia, Canada
  - Redstone Flat Indian Reserve No. 1, an Indian Reserve near Redstone, British Columbia
  - Redstone Flat Indian Reserve No. 1A, an Indian Reserve near Redstone, British Columbia
  - Redstone Cemetery Indian Reserve No. 1B, an Indian Reserve near Redstone, British Columbia
- Redstone, Telopea, a heritage-listed house at 34 Adderton Road, Telopea, New South Wales
- Redstone, Calgary, a neighbourhood in the northeast quadrant of Calgary, Alberta, Canada
- Red Stone Gorge, in Shaanxi, China
- Redstone Lake (Haliburton County), in Haliburton County
- Redstone Lake (Sudbury District), in Sudbury District

== Literature and media ==
- Redstone (comics), a Marvel Comics super villain
- Redstone (Watership Down), a warren in the animated television series Watership Down
- Redstone Science Fiction, an online science fiction magazine

== Gaming ==
- Redstone (Minecraft), a fictional mineral in the video game Minecraft
- Red Stone (game), a Korean 2D massively multiplayer online role-playing game

== Other uses ==
- Presbytery of Redstone, a regional religious organization in western Pennsylvania
- Redstone, the codename of the versions of Windows 10 released from 2016 to 2018
