= Sarah Milner Smith =

- Born: Sarah Ann Milner; March , 1844; Kingston, Ontario, Canada
- Died: January 2, 1939 (aged 94); Masonville, Colorado
- Occupations: Teacher, boardinghouse landlord, rancher
- Known for: First teacher in Larimer County, Colorado and her efforts to grow the Buckhorn community

Sarah Milner Smith (née Milner; March 1844–January 2, 1939) was an American pioneer and teacher in the Colorado Territory. Smith and her brothers were born in Canada and the family moved to northern Illinois by 1860. The Milners traveled by wagon train to Colorado, during the Pike's Peak Gold Rush. Her father and brothers worked the mines near Central City, Colorado, and earned enough money to buy a stage station. Then, they established a farm. The family settled near what is now Loveland.

Smith taught for fourteen years. Smith was a teacher in early Colorado schools: in Burlington (later Longmont, Colorado); near Loveland, Colorado and Fort Namaqua; in Masonville; and Loveland. She made a significant impact on the lives of her students and on the growth of the Buckhorn community. A plaque installed on the Loveland High School by the Namaqua chapter of the Daughters of the American Revolution to honor her influence. She had a Loveland school named after her.

Smith homesteaded in the Buckhorn Valley and was known as a pioneer rancher. She first operated a dairy farm. Smith helped the community grow and sparked the establishment of the Masonville Community Church.

== Early life ==
Sarah Milner was born in March 1844 in Kingston, Ontario, Canada to Joseph and Sarah Milner, both of whom were born about 1810 in England. Her siblings were Joseph, Benjamin, and James, who were born in the 1840s in Canada. The family lived in a mansion, and was taught by private tutors.

The Milners left Canada in 1852 and moved to Chicago, where Joseph manufactured brick and was a contractor. They lived in Freeport and, in 1860, in Rockford. Milner attended public schools and began teaching younger children at age 16.

== Colorado pioneers ==
The family left for Colorado in 1864, traveling for almost four months with other families. They traveled in a wagon train across Native American tribes' land, limiting their ability to hunt. During the trip, several indigenous people came to their camp looking for food and tobacco. They tried to steal their horses. A group of Native Americans began traveling with the wagon train in the far northeastern corner of Colorado. An old chief came to Milner and played with one of her curls, after which she stayed with her father on the wagon seat, which caused the man to smile. During the westward journey, she learned to "hide her fears and persevere".

Author Barbara Fleming describes the things that Milner would have learned to survive as she crossed the prairies with her family and what she would have needed to do every day to survive. She would likely have hauled water, cooked over an open fire, and killed, gutted, and cooked chickens and other animals. Making soap, washing clothes in a bucket, performing farming and homesteading chores, and learning how to shoot a weapon were other things that pioneering women had to do. Once she settled, she may have had to manage the loneliness of being without nearby neighbors.

When the Milners arrived in Denver, they learned there was a planned attack on the town of cabins and tents. Scouting parties traveled up to 20 miles (32 km) from Denver and did not find any Native Americans. Joseph Milner and his sons worked in the mines near Central City and saved enough money to buy a stage station near what is now Longmont on the St. Vrain Creek. He sold the station and bought a farm in 1867. (Note: In 1873, Joseph Milner built a brick house, possibly the first in the county, that is now a historic home. Some of his children lived with him in the house.)

Milner taught school in 1865 at a settlement in Burlington (later Longmont, Colorado). The next year, she taught at a one-room log schoolhouse along the Big Thompson River, becoming the first public school teacher in Larimer County, Colorado. She boarded with Judge W. B. Osborn, one of three school board members and financier of the school, and his family.

Hattie (née Milner) Gabriel, the daughter of Milner Smith's brother Joe and Milner's student, reminisced, "There were about 20 students, all different ages, there were no grades, and none of us had the same books". Milner Smith earned money to pay for books and other items by charging for admission to spelling bees and debates. She also held entertainment events with "home talent of no mean order seemed free to express itself on any subject."

The community thought that the school was too remote, so they gathered sufficient oxen from within the county to pull the school .5 miles (0.80 km) or a couple of miles to Old St. Louis in what is now Loveland. The cabin was moved to land along the Big Thompson River owned by Nelse Hollowell. Bands of Native Americans stopped by the schoolhouse on their way southeast to their hunting grounds for buffalo.

By 1870, the family established a farm in Big Thompson, Larimer County when it was Colorado Territory. (Note: Another family member, Samuel Milner, was born about 1830 in England and lived with Joseph and his family in 1870.) Milner Mountain and Milner Glade are named after this family. (Note: Milner Pass is said to be named for Sarah's brothers, Edward and Eugene who, while traveling to Oregon, crossed the continental divide through the pass. The National Park Service reports that the pass is named after T.J. Milner, a railroad promoter, surveyed the area for a railway line, but it was never built.)

== Marriage and children ==
In 1870, (Note: Milner is also said to have been married about 1869 or 1873,) Milner married Edward C. Smith, a friend of her brothers, becoming Sarah Milner Smith. Edward was a teacher and the first elected county clerk of Larimer County. Edward was a soldier for the 3rd Colorado Cavalry Regiment under John Chivington. He was among the soldiers who "slaughtered scores of helpless Indian women, children, and old men" at the Sand Creek Massacre, "an incident that haunted and sickened him for the rest of his life". Edward suffered from tuberculosis, which he contracted before coming to Colorado where it was thought he would improve.

The couple had three children, Edward, Eugene, and Alice, a daughter who married John Spence. The family lived in the Arkansas Valley (of the Arkansas River) for six years and then moved to Pueblo. Edward had a difficult time finding long-term employment to support the family. They then moved back north to East St Louis jn Colorado. Edward died after suffering with pneumonia.

== Widowhood and death ==
Smith operated a boardinghouse, Big Thompson House, in Loveland which was owned by the railroad that had recently come to he area, but she had a hard time making enough to support her family and was concerned by the rough manner of her railroad employee boarders. Smith passed the teacher's examination, which had become a requirement for teachers, and taught one term. She lost her position because she was not considered "stylish enough", and some people, including former students, protested the action with the school board.

She purchase a homestead using her husband's veteran benefits which was operated as a dairy farm and later as a ranch (Note: Eugene Smiths obituary says that she homesteaded a ranch, and Kenneth Jessen of the Loveland Reporter-Herald said that she bought a dairy farm.) at Buckhorn Creek, near Masonville and her brother Ben's ranch. Her sons Edward and Eugene worked on their mother's and neighbors ranches. Eugene later established his own ranch in the area and Edward ran and later inherited Sarah's ranch. Smith and her sons contributed to the growth of the Buckhorn Creek area, including the establishment of the Masonville Community Church, where she sometimes served as a children's Sunday school teacher, under the guidance of the First Presbyterian Church of Fort Collins. In 1880, it was reported "to be in extremely backward condition" and was subject to mountain lions, rattlesnakes, and flooding of Buckhorn Creek. Smith and her children were one of six families to operate a ranch on the stock range. The Union ditch was built to irrigate the land.

She taught at the Masonville School in 1877 and three terms at the old Washington School in Loveland beginning in 1885.

Smith died on January 2, 1939 in Masonville, Colorado at the family home of her oldest son Edward which was built on land originally part of her original ranch.

== Legacy ==
The Sarah Milner Elementary School was named after her.

The Namaqua chapter of the Daughters of the American Revolution dedicated a memorial tablet at the front entrance of the Loveland High School in honor of her. Milner Smith and many of her former students, who were also Loveland pioneers were at the dedication in 1928. All of her living students from her first term were present. She received the recognition because her students became "conspicuous leaders in the political, educational, and business life of Northern Colorado"—and because of her contributions to the growth of the Buckhorn area.

She was the great-grandmother of trial lawyer Gerry Spence (born 1929). Her grandson Joseph Smith worked as a sled technician is support of the Apollo space program. Her granddaughter, Barbara Smith, worked during World War II as a blue print drafter for aircraft production in San Diego and later was active in local politics and social programs.

== Publications ==
- Smith, Sarah Ann Milner; Smith, Eugene Bradford (1951). Pioneer epic. [The life history of Sarah Ann (Milner) Smith]. Boulder, Colorado: Johnson Publishing Company. OCLC 4954070. — Written by Smith's son about her life as a pioneer

The book Ranching on Eagle Eye by Sarah Lindsay Schmidt was dedicated to Smith, "a Colorado ranch-woman pioneer", and the exemplary men who Schmidt worked with on ranches in Colorado.

== See also ==
- Clara Brown, former enslaved person and philanthropist inducted into the Colorado Women's Hall of Fame
- Elizabeth Hickok Robbins Stone - pioneer, businesswoman, inducted into the Colorado Women's Hall of Fame
- Anna Wolfrom - first female homesteader, successful businesswoman, and playwright
