= Redstone River =

Redstone River may refer to the following rivers:

- Redstone River (Mackenzie), a tributary of the Mackenzie River in the Northwest Territories, Canada
- Redstone River (Haliburton County, Ontario), flows from southern Algonquin Provincial Park to the Gull River in Ontario, Canada
- Redstone River (Northeastern Ontario), that flows from Semple Lake to its mouth at Night Hawk Lake, Ontario, Canada
- Redstone River (Alaska), a tributary to the Ambler River, in Alaska, United States
- Red Stone River (Wyoming and Montana), also known as Powder River, Wyoming and Montana, United States

== See also ==
- Redstone Creek (disambiguation)
