= Anna Wolfrom =

Early homesteader and writer

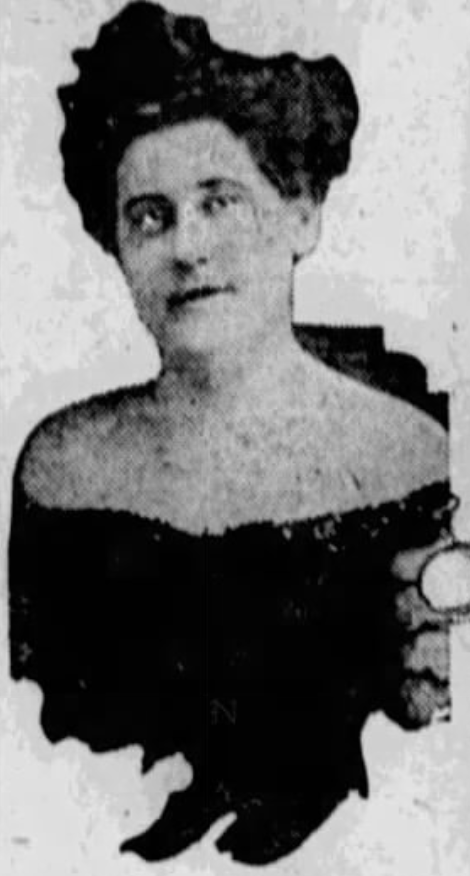
- Image printed in 1917
- Born: ca. 1872
- Died: July 12, 1950; Estes Park, Colorado
- Occupations: Teacher, writer, homesteader, and businesswoman
- Known for: Being the first successful female homesteader and businesswoman in the Estes Park area

Anna Wolfrom (ca. 1872–July 12, 1950) was a pioneer homesteader, teacher, writer, and businesswoman in Estes Park, Colorado. She was an alumnus of Columbia University and Oxford University. She also spent summers and studied in Paris. Her published works include Sacajawea, the Indian princess. She established five businesses in and around Estes Park and another in New Orleans, Louisiana. She was the "first successful female entrepreneur in the Estes Park area." Her success inspired five women to homestead in or near Estes Park by 1917.

== Early life and education ==
The daughter of Louis and Anne Wolfrom, Anna was born about 1872 in Massachusetts and was raised in Kansas City, Missouri. Both of her parents were immigrants. Her father was born in Germany, and her mother in Ireland. Her siblings included her older brother Philip (who was not alive at the time of her death), James R. Wolfrom and her half-siblings Louis Wolfrom, Clara Wolfrom, and Mary Wolfrom Murray.

Wolfrom studied at Columbia University and studied playwriting in Paris and at Oxford University in England. She studied at the Sorbonne for three years, including 1894 and 1897. (Note: In 1894, she traveled to Paris with her brother, Philip, who was an artist who also studied in Paris. She spent the summer in Paris in 1897.) She graduated from the University of Missouri in 1907.

== Career ==
=== Teacher ===
Wolfrom began teaching in Kansas City, Missouri in 1890. Between 1896 and 1904 or more, she taught at Yeager School Lathrop School, and taught French in a Kansas City school. Meanwhile, in 1900, Wolfrom taught at a school in Estes Park. In 1917, Wolfrom taught at Northeast High School in Kansas City and lived in the Estes Park cabin a few months a year.

=== Homesteader ===
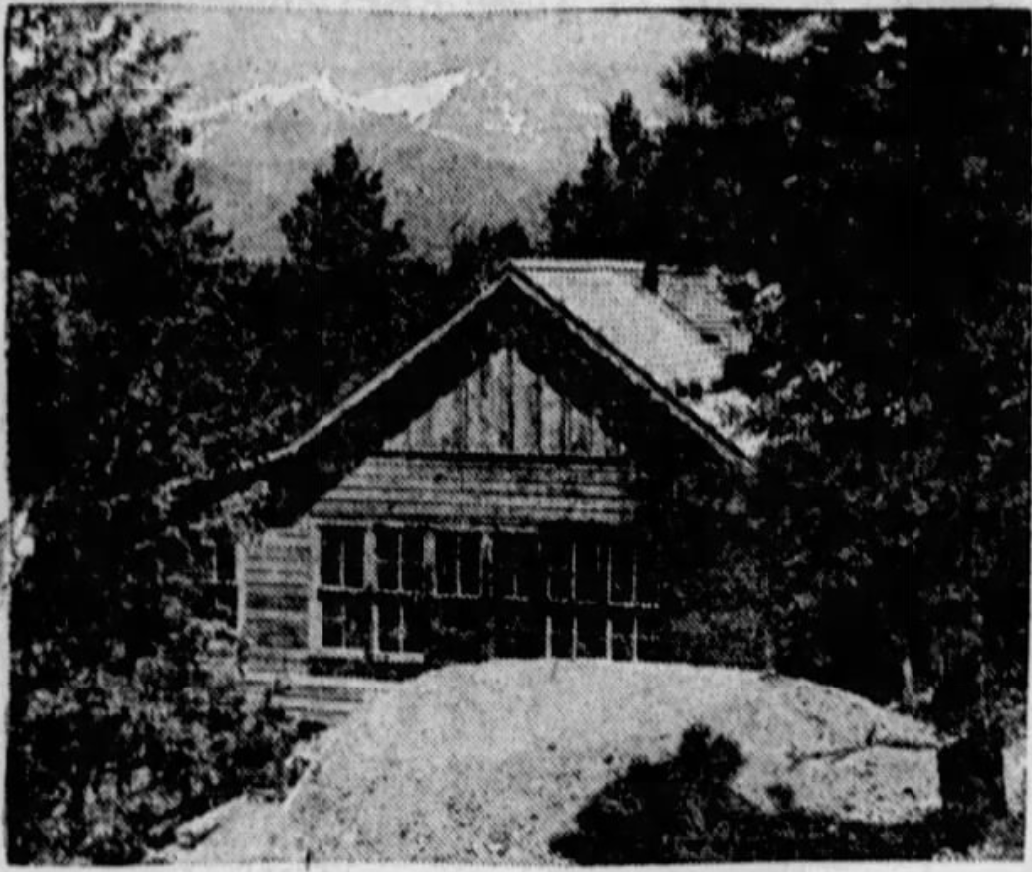
Anna Wolfrom's cabin, Estes Park, July 28, 1917, Kansas City Post

In December 1903, while studying at Oxford University in England, Wolfrom was visited by an acquaintance, Guy Robert LaCoste, who negotiated acquisition of land in Estes Park. Wolfrom and LaCoste then met with Windham Wyndham-Quin, 4th Earl of Dunraven and Mount-Earl, Estes Park's largest land owner. Dunraven told her how to homestead land in Estes Park.

External image
- Anna Wolfrom, History Colorado]

Wolfrom filed for 160 acres of land under the Homestead Act and built a cabin on Aspen Brook, near Estes Park and the Rocky Mountain National Park. She hauled wood up to her land for the initial, small board and batten cabin. In 1913, she built a log home with a stone chimney after she received title to the land. She did most of the work herself, bringing lumber, supplies, and groceries in a wheelbarrow along a steep path from Estes Park, which was about 5 miles (8.0 km) away.

=== Businesswomen and playwright ===
Hikers passed her home when the Wind River Trail was opened along Aspen Brook. She opened a tea room called Wigwam Tea Room in 1914 for hikers to rest and get refreshments. It had a gift shop where she sold curios, Native American artifacts, and antiques. This augmented her income as a teacher and writer of plays. She was the first female homesteader and the "first successful female entrepreneur in the Estes Park area". Her initial customers arrived on the trail after she had a road built, doing most of the work herself, people also drove to the Wigwam Tea Room. Her success inspired five women to homestead near Estes Park by 1917.

By 1921, she lived in Estes Park nine months of the year and spent the rest of the time traveling and buying merchandise for the Wigwam Tea Room. Estes Park became a popular tourist location. In 1920, more than 200 people visited her store each day. From 1920 to 1922, she established more businesses and expanded the size of the Wigwam Tea Room. The businesses included the Indian Shop, the Beaver Point store and filling station, the Belknap Cottages, and the Louise Gift Shop in Estes Park. In 1926, she established a gift store in New Orleans. Wolfrom continued to operate the Wigwam Tea Room until the year of her death.

== Personal life ==
She was married twice, first on January 13, 1923, to Dr. Orville H. Dove in Jackson, Missouri, becoming Anna Wolfrom Dove. They then lived in Estes Park. After Dr. Dove died, she married John T. McNamara, but the marriage was annulled. She died at her home on July 12, 1950. At the time of her death, she was known as Anna Wolfrom Dove and Anna Wolfrom Dove McNamara. She was buried in Hudson, New York.

After her death, her Estes Park property was owned by the Coburn and Reichardt families. It was sold in 1985 to the National Park Service to build a trail to allow hikers to hike to and from Lily Lake from the Wind River Trail.

== Publications ==
- A romance of Wolf Hollow. Boston: The Gorham Press. 1902.
- Albion and Rosamond, and The living voice, two dramas. Boston, Serman, French & Company. 1916.
- Human wisps, six one-act plays. Boston, Sherman, French & company. 1917.
- Sacajawea, the Indian princess : the Indian girl who piloted the Lewis and Clark expedition across the Rocky mountains : a play in three acts. Kansas City, Mo. : Burton Publishing Company. 1918.

== See also ==
- Isabella Bird § Travels in middle life, author of A Lady's Life in the Rocky Mountains
- Esther Burnell, naturalist, wife of Enos Mills, Longs Peak Inn operator
- Sarah Milner Smith - first teacher in Larimer County, Colorado, known for her pioneering efforts

Inducted into the Colorado Women's Hall of Fame

- Clara Brown, former enslaved woman, first black settler in Colorado, entrepreneur, community leader, and philanthropist
- Elizabeth Hickok Robbins Stone, pioneer hotel owner and operator, financial backer for local business, and miller
