= Esther Burnell Mills =

American pioneer and homesteader (1889–1964)

- Born: Esther Burnell; August , 1889; Eureka, Kansas
- Died: April 8, 1964 (aged 74); Englewood, Colorado
- Occupations: Decorator consultant, writer, editor, naturalist, inn operator
- Notable work: Co-authored Enos Mills of the Rockies and edited and published three volumes and additional writing by Mills
- Spouse: Enos Mills
- Children: Enda Mills Kiley
- Parent(s): Mary A. (née Frayer) and Arthur Tappan Burnell

Esther Burnell Mills (August 1889–April 8, 1964) was an American pioneer and homesteader in Estes Park, Colorado. Esther Burnell and her sister became the National Park Service's first certified nature guides. She married Enos Mills, who led the establishment of the Rocky Mountain National Park. They ran the Longs Peak Inn, and after her husband's death, Mills continued to operate the inn. She edited and published three post-humous volumes and additional works by Enos Mills. With Hildegarde Hawthorne, she co-authored Enos Mills of the Rockies.

== Early life and education ==
Esther A. Burnell, born in August 1889 in Eureka, Kansas, (Note: The obituary spelled her birthplace Ureka, Kansas.) was the daughter of Mary A. (née Frayer) and Arthur Tappan Burnell, a professor and school principal with positions in the states of Washington, Kansas, Kentucky, Alabama, Tennessee, and Oregon. Arthur was also a minister.

Her siblings, born about every two years, were older brother Eugene, older sister Elizabeth (Bessie), and younger sister Bernice. Burnell studied at Lake Erie College in Cleveland, Ohio, and Pratt Institute in Brooklyn, New York. Her sister Elizabeth graduated from the University of Michigan with masters' degrees in mathematics and physics. Lake Erie College employed her as the head of the mathematics and physics department. Burnell worked at the Sherwin Williams Paint Company as a consulting decorator. Before moving to Colorado, she lived in Cleveland and then Des Moines, Iowa. She had been overworked at her job and had a nervous breakdown. Burnell and Elizabeth had met Enos Mills the prior year during his speaking engagement in Cleveland, Ohio. Mills invited them to visit Rocky Mountain National Park and Mills' nature study center at the inn. Esther came to Estes Park in 1916 for a visit and became his personal secretary in the summer of 1917. When her sister, Elizabeth Burnell, who had an equal enthusiasm for the natural world, visited for the summer, they became nature guides at Longs Peak Inn. Esther was the first licensed Nature Guide with the National Park Service, and Elizabeth was the second. The National Park Service now calls this the Field of Interpretation. Dedicated in 1916, the park is located near Estes Park, Colorado.

== Homesteading ==
Burnell and her sister Elizabeth vacationed at Longs Peak Inn in Estes Park, Colorado, in the summer of 1916. Burnell took walks in the area to observe nature, wearing knickerbockers for hiking and climbing rather than wearing city-appropriate dresses and high shoes. Her health improved in the mountain environment. Her friend, Katherine Garetson, met Burnell when she arrived in Estes Park. Concerned about her health, Garetson decided that Burnell was a frail city slicker, but after some time in the mountains she said her friend "looked wonderfully pretty animation transforming her into a beauty".

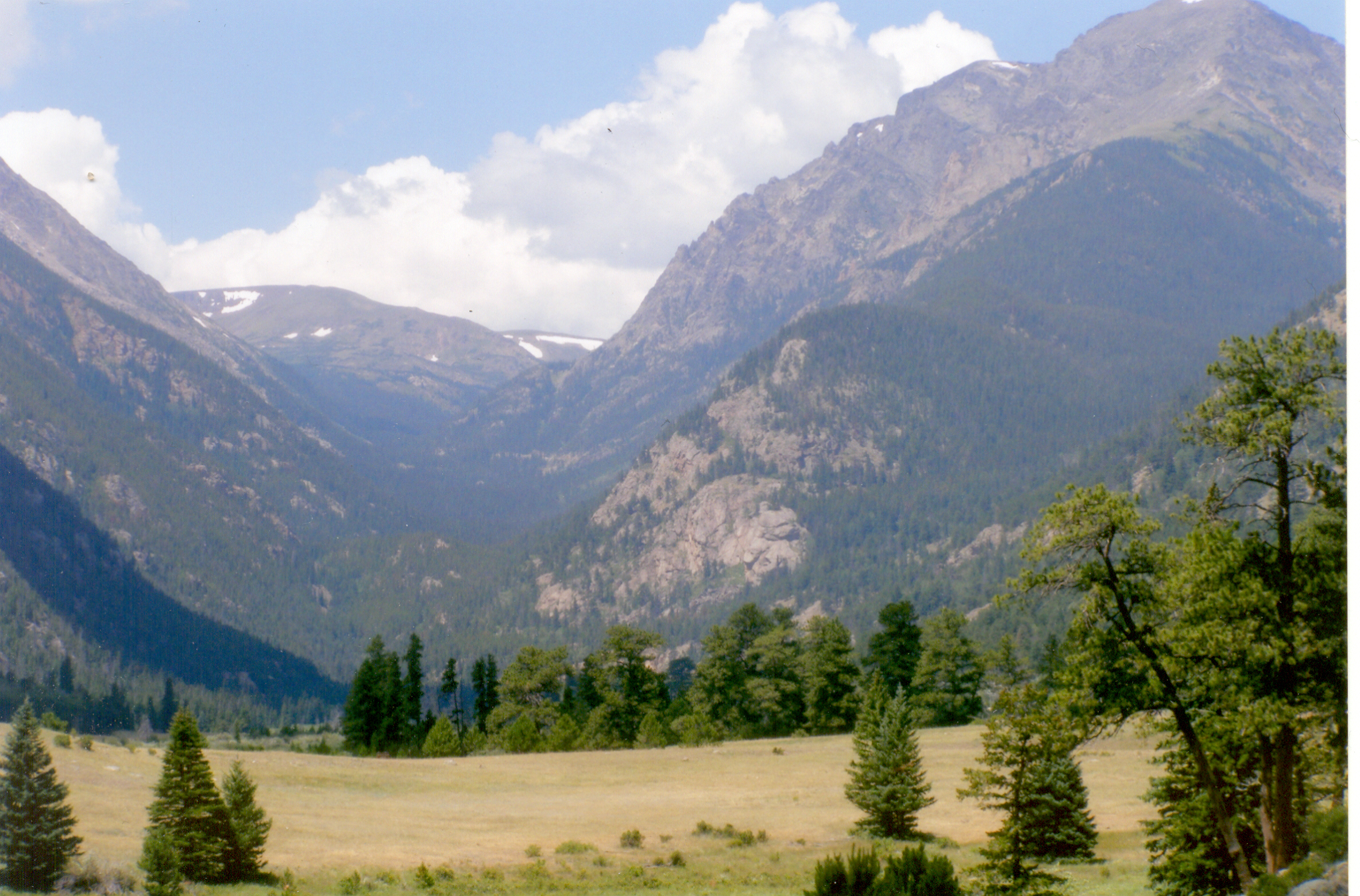
Horseshoe Park in Rocky Mountain National Park, along which Burnell began the process to homestead and built a cabin

Burnell extended her vacation to remain in Colorado. She homesteaded 120 acres near MacGregor Pass alongside Horseshoe Park. Burnell designed a five-room cabin and worked on the construction of her home, which she named Keewaydin. (Note: Keewaydin is mentioned in The Song of Hiawatha by Henry Wadsworth Longfellow: "I will share my kingdom with you; / Ruler shall you be thenceforward / Of the Northwest-Wind, / Keewaydin, / Of the home-wind, / the Keewaydin.) She built some of the furniture for her home and established a garden. Deer, mountain sheep, and birds visited her property.

Burnell's closest neighbors were the Fall River Lodge and Horseshoe Inn, about 1 mile (1.6 km) from her land. Fellow homesteaders lived two or more miles away. Burnell walked 4 miles (6.4 km) east to town to visit friends, pick up her mail, and purchase groceries and supplies that she carried back to her cabin. She embraced the outdoor life, hiking in the day or night. She made long treks, wearing snowshoes in the winter, up to 30 miles (48 km) away on the Ute and North Inlet trails. Sometimes, she camped outdoors, like when she met at a midway point of the 16 miles (26 km) distance between her cabin and Katherine Garetson's cabin. Katherine Garetson began homesteading two years before Burnell.

Burnell wrote poems and stories that Mills reviewed for her, and she typed pages for Your National Parks that he was writing. She made presentations about wildflowers at Long Peak Inn. Elizabeth visited in the summer of 1917 and took a sabbatical to spend a year in 1918 (Note: Brulliard states that Burnell became a nature guide in the summer of 1917.) when they were trained by Enos to be nature guides for Rocky Mountain National Park. Burnell was the basis for the homesteader that Mills wrote about in his publication The Development of a Woman Nature Guide. Burnell and Mills developed a close relationship through conversations about conservation and education, hikes, and shared values. Interested in making her his wife, Mills courted her. He shared a copy of Your National Park that she had helped him with to show the fruition of their work together. Burnell appreciated Mills' work, like his publications and speaking tours.

== Marriage and child ==
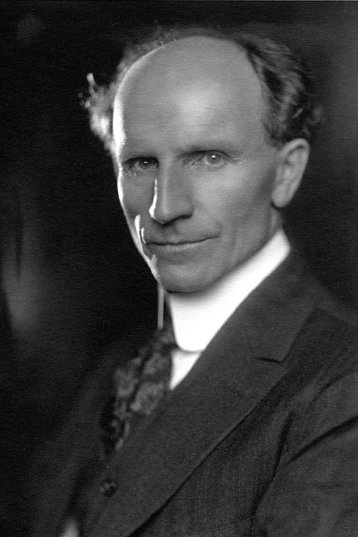
Enos A. Mills, ca. 1915

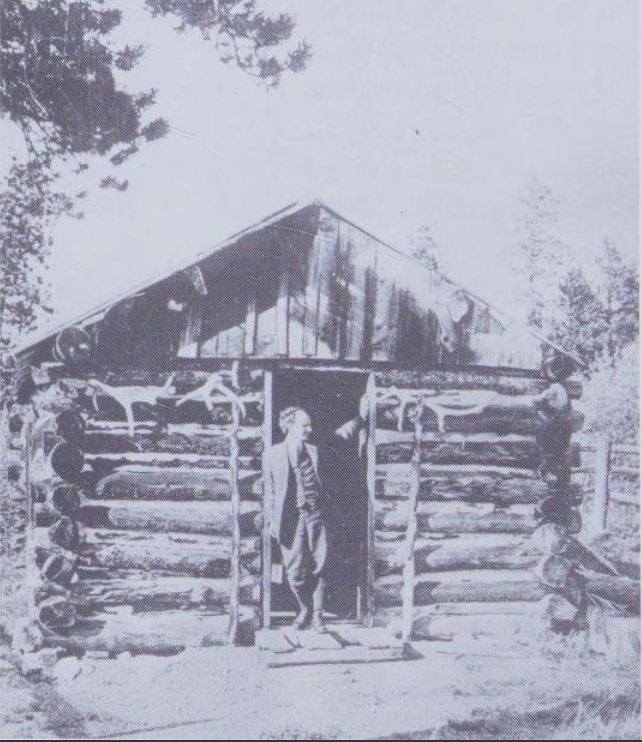
Enos Mills at the door of the homesteading cabin he built in 1885 as a teen on Longs Peak. It is now a museum about Enos Mills.

Burnell married Enos Mills on August 12, 1918, becoming Esther Burnell Mills. The simple and private ceremony was held at Mills' homestead cabin near Long Peak Inn. Mills enlarged his log home, separate from the homestead cabin, for Burnell and their forthcoming child. Their daughter Enda was born April 27, 1919. She was later known as Enda Kiley.

Enos Mills wrote about his wife and child in Development of a Woman Guide and Burnell published A Baby's Life in the Rocky Mountains about Enda.

Enos Mills had been sick, complicated by stress, for months in the summer and early fall of 1922. He then had an abscess that required surgery in his mouth and jaw, the infection brought on blood poisoning that stopped his heart in the early morning of September 21, 1922. (Note: There are individual reports of his cause of death which was in fact a combinations of causes. For instance, he is reported to have died of an infected tooth and a heart attack.) Enos was engaged in disputes with the Rocky Mountain National Park about access to the park. Mills took on the fight after her husband's death.

Having married Enos, Mills never finalized her homesteading claim (that required five years of farming to get title to the land).

== Businesswoman ==
Enos and Esther Burnell Mills ran the Long Peak Inn after their marriage and Mills ran the inn until 1946 after her husband's death. Her sister Elizabeth spent the summers with her sister from 1917 until 1930. During that time, she led groups up Longs Peak and gave guided nature walks.

By the 1960s, Mills lived in Ohio during the summers; she ran the Red Bird Book Store. In the winters, she lived in Estes Park.

== Writer, editor, and speaker ==
Enos' brusque manner and inability to effectively communicate with people who disagreed with him damaged his reputation. As a result, he lived a "self-imposed and self-righteous isolation" from all but a few friends and his wife. Mills improved her husband's reputation by publishing some of his writings and co-authoring a book about him.

When Enos died, he had some nearly finished works, which she edited and published. She also published more material for three or four books in or after 1922. In 1935, Burnell and Hildegarde Hawthorne co-authored Enos Mills of the Rockies. Hildegarde was Nathaniel Hawthorne's granddaughter. Eleanor Roosevelt recommended the book. Mills spoke before "countless lecture audiences".

Biographer Alexander Drummond states of Burnell's work on Enos Mills of the Rockies,

The political batterings that Mills took and dealt in his last years left his reputation in need of repair, and to that task Esther set herself with a widow's devotion and perspective... [Through the book,] Mills is scrubbed clean to reveal only his most endearing qualities — and there were many of those, too. The book is readable, and, though factually flawed, it is reliable in its devout loyalty to preserving the image of the famous man whom Esther won and lost in so brief a span.

Mills' efforts added to a growing appreciation of Enos Mills as a conservationist and naturalist after his death, who was called the "Father of the Rocky Mountain National Park." Mills prepared a series of scrapbooks of his life, with his papers and articles written about him that is in the collection of the Western History Department of the Denver Public Library.

== Death ==
Esther Burnell Mills died four hours after a fall on April 8, 1964, in Englewood, Colorado.

== See also ==
Some articles about 19th-century women in Colorado

- Isabella Bird, (1831–1904), explorer, writer, and natural historian author of A Lady's Life in the Rocky Mountains
- Anna Wolfrom - first female homesteader, successful businesswoman, and playwright of Estes Park

Inducted into the Colorado Women's Hall of Fame

- Clara Brown (c. 1800–1885), former enslaved woman, first black settler in Colorado, entrepreneur, community leader, and philanthropist
- Julia Archibald Holmes (1838–1887), first woman to climb
- Martha Maxwell (1831–1881), self-educated naturalist and artist who helped found modern taxidermy
- Owl Woman (1828–1847), Cheyenne princess who managed relations between Native American tribes and Anglo American men
- Elizabeth Hickok Robbins Stone (1801–1895), pioneer hotel owner and operator, financial backer for local business, and miller
- Augusta Tabor (1833–1905), entrepreneur, first wife of silver king Horace Tabor
- Baby Doe Tabor (1854–1935), second wife of Colorado businessman Horace Tabor and inspiration for the opera The Ballad of Baby Doe

== Sources ==
- Drummond, Alexander (1995). Enos Mills : citizen of nature. Nivot, Colorado: University Press of Colorado. ISBN 978-0-87081-407-5.
- Mills, Enos Abijah (1990). In Beaver World. Lincoln: University of Nebraska Press. ISBN 978-0-8032-8172-1.
- Robertson, Janet (1990). The Magnificent Mountain Women: Adventures in the Colorado Rockies. University of Nebraska Press. ISBN 978-0-8032-8933-8.
