= Red Sandstone =

Red Sandstone may refer to:

- Sandstone appearing red due to the inclusion of iron oxides (hematite)
- Old Red Sandstone, a British lithostratigraphic unit (a sequence of rock strata) to which stratigraphers accord supergroup status
- New Red Sandstone, a chiefly British geological term for the beds of red sandstone and associated rocks laid down throughout the Permian to the end of the Triassic

== See also ==
- Redstone (disambiguation)
- Ultisols
