= Redstone Creek =

Redstone Creek or Red Stone Creek may refer to:

- Redstone Creek (Colorado)
- Redstone Creek (Pennsylvania)
- Redstone Creek (South Dakota)
- Red Stone Creek
