= East Longs Peak Trail =

Coordinates: 40°16′20″N 105°36′02″W

- East Longs Peak Trail--Longs Peak Trail--Keyhole Route--Shelf Trail
- U.S. National Register of Historic Places
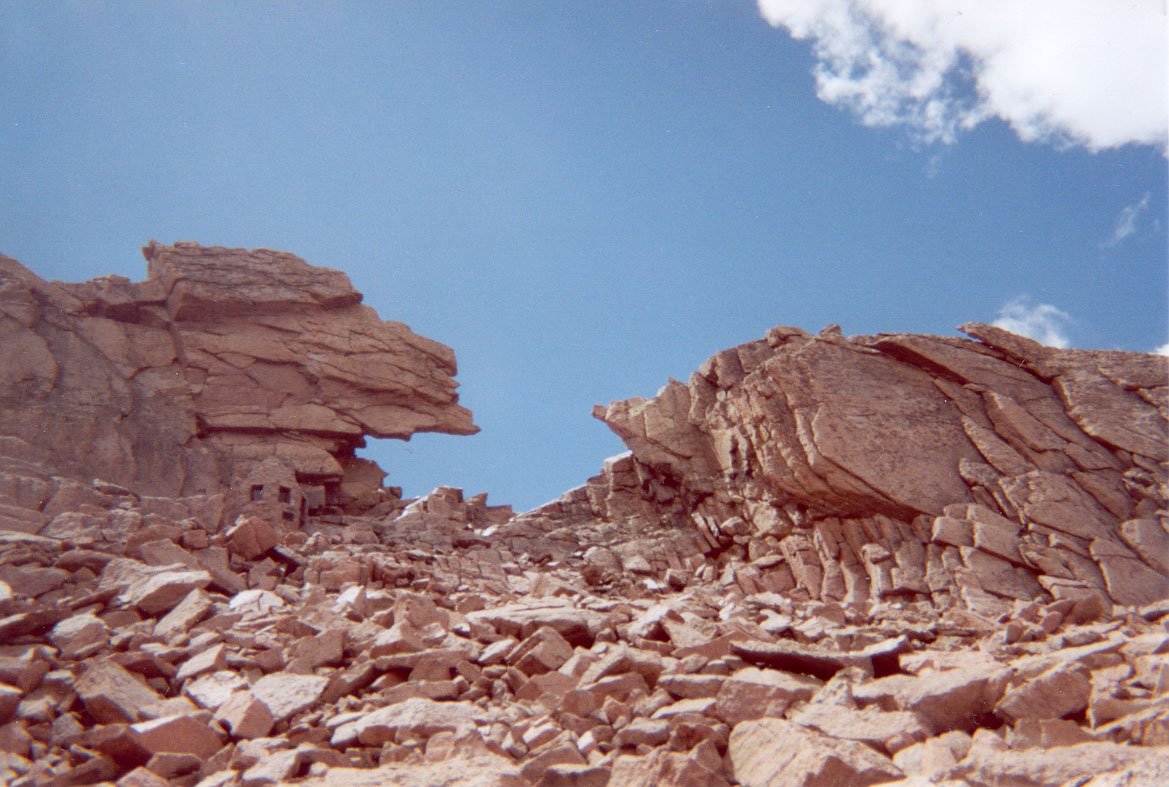
- Along the Keyhole Route

- Location within Colorado Location within the United States
- Location: Rocky Mountain National Park, Colorado, USA
- Nearest city: Allenspark, Colorado
- Built: 1925
- Architect: National Park Service
- MPS: Rocky Mountain National Park MPS
- NRHP reference No.: 07000740
- Added to NRHP: July 10, 2007

The East Longs Peak Trail, Longs Peak Trail, Keyhole Route or Shelf Trail in Rocky Mountain National Park is listed on the National Register of Historic Places for its significance in the early recreational development of the park. The trail was laid out in 1878 by Reverend Elkanah Lamb, long before the designation of the region as parkland. It was extended in 1910 by Enos Mills. The trail leads from the Tahosa Valley, running counterclockwise around Longs Peak and reaching the summit at 14,259 feet.

== See also ==
- National Register of Historic Places listings in Boulder County, Colorado
- National Register of Historic Places listings in Larimer County, Colorado
