= Elkanah Lamb =

American minister and mountain guide (1832–1915)

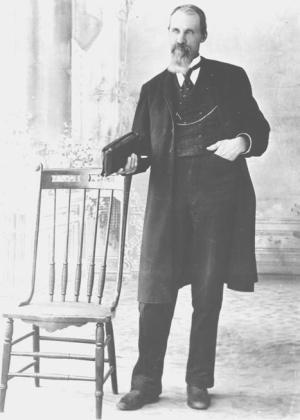
Rev. Elkanah J. Lamb (1832–1915) was a United Brethren Church missionary and traveling minister who was an early settler of Estes Park, Colorado and is said to be the founder of the United Brethren Church in Longmont, Colorado. Lamb was the first guide to the summit of Longs Peak. He owned and operated the Longs Peak House.

Elkanah J. Lamb (January 1, 1832 – April 7, 1915) was born in Indiana and moved westward through Iowa to Kansas and Nebraska during his early adulthood. He became a minister of the Church of the United Brethren and traveled through the Kansas and Nebraska frontier to preach to people in their homes or school houses. Lamb spent a year in Colorado as a missionary. During that time, he visited Estes Park and climbed Longs Peak. Lamb's slide on Longs Peak is named for his treacherous descent in 1871.

After Lamb returned to his home in Nebraska, he made the decision in 1873 to move to Colorado and continue his ministry. Lamb initially preached to people he met while traveling through the St. Vrain valley, and he was later a church minister and elder. To supplement the little money he made preaching, Lamb worked as a mountain guide. Lamb was one of the first professional mountain guides in the area that became the Rocky Mountain National Park, and he was the first guide up Longs Peak. Lamb opened Longs Peak House in 1875 to lodge people who wanted to climb to the peak's summit. He and his wife operated the inn for a quarter of a century.

== Personal life ==
Lamb was born on January 1, 1832, in St. Joseph County, Indiana to Samuel Lamb. He was named for the Biblical Elkanah, which means "whom God possessed". The Lamb family moved to Black Hawk Purchase in Iowa in 1842. They lived along the Des Moines River, one mile from a Native American village. Lamb grew up on a farm.

Lamb married a woman named Welta Jane on August 24, 1853. In the spring of 1857, the Lambs moved with a group of people from Dallas County, Iowa to Linn County in eastern Kansas. In 1860, Lamb spent a brief period prospecting for gold in Colorado with his cousin, Enos Mills Sr., and then he returned to Kansas. Lamb and his first wife had a son, Carlyle, about 1862. The Lambs lived in Kansas until May 1866, when they moved to a 160-acre homestead in Saline County, Nebraska. His wife died in 1867. Lamb remarried on September 29, 1868, to a widow named Jemima (Jane) Morger, who had three sons. (Note: A Mountain Boyhood states that her maiden name was Caldwell, but as stated on her son's marriage certificate, her maiden name was Jemima J. Spencer.)

== Minister ==
Lamb decided to become a minister of the Church of the United Brethren after he moved to Nebraska. He was an itinerant preacher on the Nebraska and Kansas frontiers who gave sermons in schools and sod houses. His work was dangerous due to the tension between the people of European descent and the Native Americans for land and food, which resulted in deaths and kidnappings. Lamb attended a Church of the United Brethren conference in Colorado, about 200 miles away, in the spring of 1870 with W.J. Caldwell and John Elliott. He spent a year in Colorado, including a visit to Estes Park in the fall of 1870, where Lamb held church services in a log schoolhouse. He then returned to Nebraska.

In 1873, Lamb moved his family to Colorado and was assigned by the United Brethren Church to minister to the people in the St. Vrain valley. He preached to settlers along the foothills and its creeks, traveling many miles in a day.

Lamb was an early settler and minister of Estes Park. He is said to have founded the United Brethren Church in Loveland. Lamb became a church elder who continued to preach into his mid-60s throughout the summer and fall months.

He published the book Past memories and future thoughts: reminiscences for over thirty years, from birth up to April 17, 1870, when I was ordained by Bishop Dickson by 1905.

== Longs Peak ==
Lamb's slide

Quicker than I can tell it, my hands failed to hold, my feet slipped, and down I went with almost an arrow’s rapidity. An eternity of thought, of life, of death, wife, and home concentrated on my mind in those two seconds. Fortunately for me, I threw my right arm around a projecting boulder which stood above the icy plain some two or three feet. This sudden stopping of my acrobatic performance brought my long walking appendages around with a musical swash… spilling all the specimens I had gathered on the summit.

— Rev. Elijah Lamb

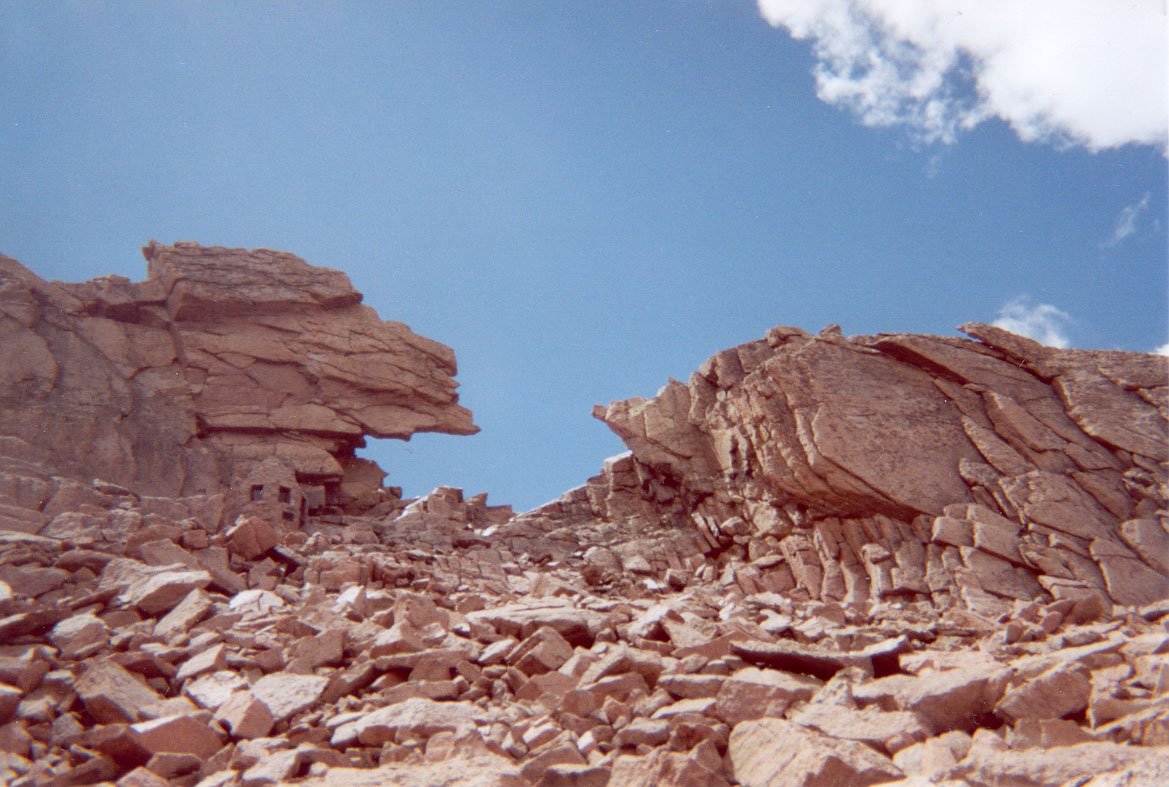
The Keyhole at Longs Peak

Lamb assembled a party in 1871 to climb Longs Peak using the Keyhole route, which has become the most popular way to ascend to the summit. Of his party, he was the only one who made it to the top. During his descent of the North Couloir, he returned along the east face, but reached a treacherous, steep point where he could not return to find an alternate route. He made his way across a very narrow ledge, ironically called "Broadway", that was hundreds of feet above Chasm Lake and at the base of the couloir. He then came to a steep slope, later called "Lamb's Slide", which is an 800 feet (240 m), 70 degree slope of ice and snow on the east face. From there, he slipped and slid down the mountain until he was able to grab a protruding rock. Lamb cut ice away with his pocketknife to create a foothold, breaking the knife in the process. He was able to get down the mountain safely and did not try the route again for 32 years, when he had safer equipment. Author Phyllis Perry said that the route was used for ascents, the next descent was made in 1903 by Enos Mills. Lamb became the first professional guide of Longs Peak.

The East Longs Peak Trail—also called Longs Peak Trail, Keyhole Route and Shelf Trail— was laid out in 1878 by Lamb and it was extended in 1910 by Enos Mills. The trail begins Tahosa Valley, runs counterclockwise around Longs Peak and reaches the summit at 14,259 feet.

Carlyle, Lamb's son, first climbed Longs Peak in 1879 and climbed Longs Peak 146 times over 40 years. Lamb's second wife, who climbed the peak on her 70th birthday, and his son often climbed the peak with him.

Carlyle became a guide and in September 1884, he took Carry J. Welton up the side of the peak. When Carlyle said that they should turn around, due to bad weather, she pressed on to climb to the top of the peak. On the descent, she collapsed at Keyhole in fierce winds around midnight. Carlyle gave her some of his clothes and descended down the mountain for help. Welton died of exposure during the period that Carlyle had run to get help from his father. It was the first death on Longs Peak. Carlyle stopped working as a guide and operated Longs Peak House. He continued to climb on his own, reaching the summit at 73 years of age in 1935.

== Longs Peak House ==
Lamb homesteaded 160 acres on land that was about 35 miles from the nearest store and in what is now Rocky Mountain National Park. Lamb established Longs Peak House and rental cabins in a small valley at the base of Longs Peak near the trail that led to the summit of the peak. He chopped down trees and brush to make a road into the property. Lamb moved in with his family in 1875. His wife ran the dairy and the lodge.

In 1885, he climbed Longs Peak by himself. Lamb became one of the first professional mountain guides in the area, and had a steady business during the summer season. Lamb said that "if they will not pay for spiritual guidance, I compelled them to pay for material elevation." In 1901 or 1902, he sold Longs Peak House to Enos Mills, who is said to be the "father of Rocky Mountain National Park." Mills renamed it Longs Peak Inn.

== Later years ==
After he sold the Longs Peak House, Lamb moved into a place called Mountain Home in Estes Park. He spent the summers there, and the winters were spent in Fort Collins. He died in Fort Collins on April 7, 1915.
