= Forks River =

River in northeastern Ontario, Canada

- Location of the mouth of the Forks River in Ontario

Location
- Country: Canada
- Province: Ontario
- Districts: Cochrane; Timiskaming; Sudbury

Physical characteristics
- Source: Forks Lake
  - location: Timiskaming, Unorganized West Part, Timiskaming District
  - coordinates: 48°06′22″N 81°10′11″W
  - elevation: 351 m (1,152 ft)
- Mouth: Night Hawk Lake
  - location: Timmins, Cochrane District
  - coordinates: 48°18′13″N 81°00′35″W
  - elevation: 274 m (899 ft)
- Length: 36 km (22 mi)

Basin features
- Tributaries
  - left: Little Forks Creek

The Forks River is a river in the James Bay and Moose River drainage basins in Cochrane and Timiskaming Districts in northeastern Ontario, Canada. It flows 36 kilometres (22 mi) from Forks Lake to its mouth at Night Hawk Lake, the source of the Frederick House River, a tributary of the Abitibi River.

== Course ==
The Forks River begins at Forks Lake in the northwest of the Unorganized West Part of Timiskaming District at an elevation of 351 metres (1,152 ft) and exits east to Lower Forks Lake. Portions of both lakes lie in the northeastern portion of the Unorganized, North Part of Sudbury District, meaning that the Forks River drainage basin is in three Ontario districts. It heads northeast, then north, flows over a small dam, and takes in the left tributary Little Forks Creek arriving from Little Forks Lake. The river turns northwest, then curves back northeast, flows into the city of Timmins in Cochrane District, and reaches its mouth at St. Peter Bay at the southern tip of Night Hawk Lake at an elevation of 274 metres (899 ft).

== Tributaries ==
- Little Forks Creek (left)

== See also ==
- List of rivers of Ontario
