= Porcupine River (Ontario) =

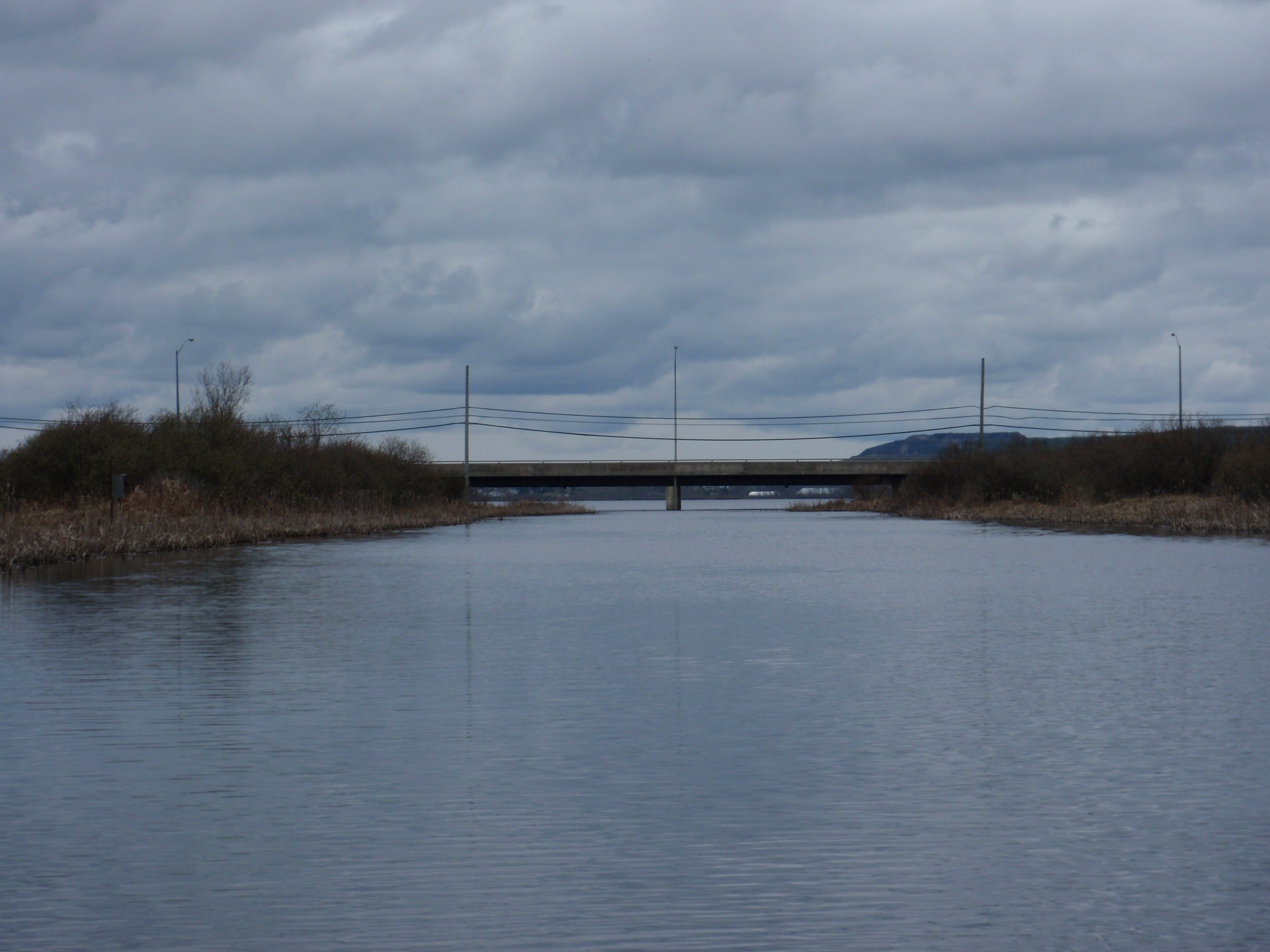
- Bridge in Porcupine from Porcupine River

- Location of the mouth of the Porcupine River in Ontario

Location
- Country: Canada
- Province: Ontario
- Region: Northeastern Ontario
- District: Cochrane

Physical characteristics
- Source: Porcupine Lake
  - coordinates: 48°29′41″N 81°10′30″W
  - elevation: 277 m (909 ft)
- Mouth: Night Hawk Lake
  - coordinates: 48°31′26″N 81°01′02″W
  - elevation: 274 m (899 ft)
- Length: 32 km (20 mi)

The Porcupine River is a river in the James Bay and Moose River drainage basins in the city of Timmins, Cochrane District in northeastern Ontario, Canada. It flows 32 kilometres (20 mi) from Porcupine Lake to its mouth at Night Hawk Lake, the source of the Frederick House River, a tributary of the Abitibi River.

== Course ==
The Porcupine River begins at Porcupine Lake at an elevation of 277 metres (909 ft) and flows northeast under Highway 101 out of the lake at the community of Porcupine between the neighbourhoods of Pottsville and Golden City. It flows northeast, takes in the left tributary North Porcupine River, flows southeast through the neighbourhood of Hoyle and again under Highway 101, and reaches its mouth at the northwest of Night Hawk Lake at an elevation of 274 metres (899 ft).

== Transportation ==
The Timmins/Porcupine Lake Water Aerodrome is on Porcupine Lake.

== Tributaries ==
- North Porcupine River
- Porcupine Lake
  - Bob's Creek (right)
  - South Porcupine River (right)

== See also ==
- List of rivers of Ontario
