= Night Hawk River =

- Location of the mouth of the Night Hawk River in Ontario

Location
- Country: Canada
- Province: Ontario
- Districts: Cochrane; Timiskaming

Physical characteristics
- Source: Austen Lake
  - location: Timiskaming, Unorganized West Part, Timiskaming District
  - coordinates: 48°04′25″N 81°02′54″W
  - elevation: 357 m (1,171 ft)
- Mouth: Night Hawk Lake
  - location: Timmins, Cochrane District
  - coordinates: 48°18′09″N 81°00′33″W
  - elevation: 274 m (899 ft)
- Length: 33 km (21 mi)

The Night Hawk River is a river in the James Bay and Moose River drainage basins in Cochrane and Timiskaming Districts in northeastern Ontario, Canada. It flows 33 kilometres (21 mi) from Austen Lake to its mouth at Night Hawk Lake, the source of the Frederick House River, a tributary of the Abitibi River.

== Course ==
The Night Hawk River begins at Austen Lake in the northwest of the Unorganized West Part of Timiskaming District at an elevation of 357 metres (1,171 ft). Portions of the primary inflow of Austen Lake, the West Night Hawk River, as well as all of that river's source, West Night Hawk Lake, lie in the northeastern portion of the Unorganized, North Part of Sudbury District, Ontario, meaning that the Night Hawk River drainage basin is in three Ontario districts.

The Night Hawk River flows northeast, passes over a small dam, turns north, and takes in the left tributary Little Night Hawk River arriving from Little Night Hawk Lake. It turns northeast again, takes in the right tributary East Night Hawk River arriving from East Night Hawk Lake, heads north, and flows into the city of Timmins in Cochrane District. The river heads northwest, takes in the left tributary West Night Hawk River, then reaches its mouth at St. Peter Bay at the southern tip of Night Hawk Lake at an elevation of 274 metres (899 ft).

== Tributaries ==
- West Night Hawk River (left)
- East Night Hawk River (right)
- Little Night Hawk River (left)
- Esker Creek (right)
- Austen Lake
  - Kitchiming Creek (left)
  - West Night Hawk River (left)
    - West Night Hawk Lake
  - Wabiasin Creek (left)

== See also ==
- List of rivers of Ontario
