= Night Hawk Lake =

- Location of Night Hawk Lake in Ontario
- Location: Cochrane, Ontario, Canada
- Coordinates: 48°28′22″N 80°58′32″W
- Type: Lake
- Part of: James Bay drainage basin
- Primary inflows: Forks River, Night Hawk River, Porcupine River, Redstone River, Whitefish River
- Max. length: 33 km (21 mi)
- Max. width: 11 km (6.8 mi)
- Surface elevation: 274 m (899 ft)

Night Hawk Lake is a lake in the city of Timmins, Cochrane District in northeastern Ontario, Canada. It is in the James Bay drainage basin and is the source of the Frederick House River, which flows via the Abitibi River and Moose River to James Bay. Night Hawk Lake is the largest lake within the boundaries of the City of Timmins.

== See also ==
- List of lakes in Ontario

== Tributaries ==
Clockwise from the Frederick House River outflow

- Tincan Creek
- Whitefish River
- Night Hawk River
- Forks River
- Redstone River
- Goose Creek
- Porcupine River
- Moose Creek
