= Redstone Lake (Sudbury District) =

- Location of Redstone Lake in Ontario.
- Location: Sudbury, Ontario, Canada
- Coordinates: 47°58′28″N 81°14′14″W
- Type: Lake
- Part of: James Bay drainage basin
- River sources: Redstone River
- Max. length: 1.5 km (0.93 mi)
- Max. width: 1.1 km (0.68 mi)
- Surface elevation: 359 m (1,178 ft)

Redstone Lake is a lake located in geographic Semple Township in the Unorganized North Part of Sudbury District in Northeastern Ontario, Canada. It is in the James Bay drainage basin and is part of the Redstone River system.

== Hydrology ==
The primary inflow, at the southwest, and outflow, at the northeast, is the Redstone River. The Redstone River flows via the Frederick House River, the Abitibi River and the Moose River to James Bay.
