= Whitefish River (Night Hawk Lake) =

- Location of the mouth of the Whitefish River in Ontario

Location
- Country: Canada
- Province: Ontario
- Districts: Cochrane; Timiskaming

Physical characteristics
- Source: Mount Sinclair Lake
  - location: Timiskaming, Unorganized West Part, Timiskaming District
  - coordinates: 47°57′33″N 80°57′15″W
  - elevation: 366 m (1,201 ft)
- Mouth: Night Hawk Lake
  - location: Timmins, Cochrane District
  - coordinates: 48°26′18″N 80°56′01″W
  - elevation: 274 m (899 ft)
- Length: 75 km (47 mi)

Basin features
- Tributaries
  - left: Little Whitefish River
  - right: East Whitefish River

The Whitefish River is a river in the James Bay and Moose River drainage basins in Cochrane and Timiskaming Districts in northeastern Ontario, Canada. It flows 75 kilometres (47 mi) from Mount Sinclair Lake to its mouth at Night Hawk Lake, the source of the Frederick House River, a tributary of the Abitibi River.

== Course ==
The Whitefish River begins at Mount Sinclair Lake, next to the 547-metre (1,795 ft) Mount Sinclair, in the northwest of the Unorganized West Part of Timiskaming District at an elevation of 366 metres (1,201 ft). It heads north and takes in the left tributary Little Whitefish River arriving from Little Whitefish Lake. The river jogs southeast and northeast, then heads north and takes in the right tributary East Whitefish River. It flows northeast into the city of Timmins in Cochrane District, takes in the right tributary Brush Creek, and reaches its mouth at the southeast of Night Hawk Lake at an elevation of 274 metres (899 ft).

== Tributaries ==
- McLeod Creek (left)
- Radisson Creek (right)
- Brush Creek (right)
- East Whitefish River (right)
- Argyle Creek (right)
- McCollum Creek (left)
- Bannockburn Creek (right)
- Little Whitefish River (left)

== See also ==
- List of rivers of Ontario
