= Hildegarde Hawthorne =

American poet

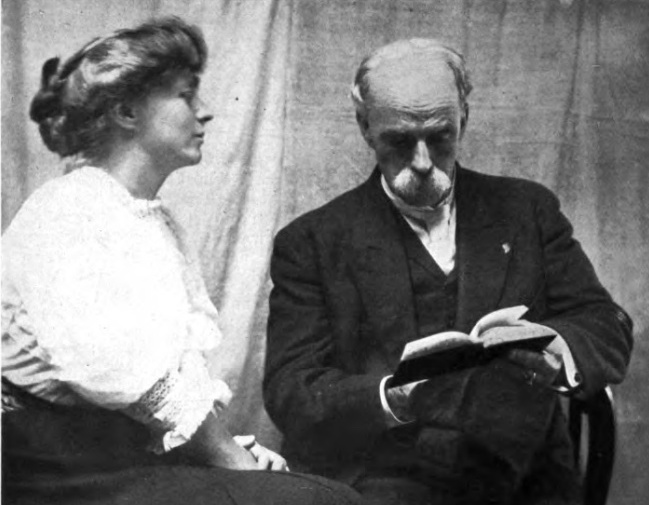
- Hildegarde Hawthorne and her father Julian Hawthorne, from a 1907 publication.
- Born: September 25, 1871; New York, United States
- Died: December 10, 1952 (aged 81); Danbury, Connecticut, United States
- Other name: Hildegarde Oskison
- Occupations: Writer; poet; biographer
- Spouse: John Milton Oskison (m. 1920)
- Parent(s): Julian Hawthorne; Minnie Amelung

Hildegarde Hawthorne (September 25, 1871 – December 10, 1952) was an American writer of supernatural and ghost stories, a poet and biographer.

== Family ==
Born on September 25, 1871, in New York City, Hildegarde Hawthorne was the granddaughter of Nathaniel Hawthorne (1804–1864) and eldest child of Julian Hawthorne (1846–1934) and Minnie Amelung Hawthorne. She lived in Germany, England, and Jamaica as a child.

== Career ==
At age sixteen Hildegarde began selling articles to the children's magazine St. Nicholas. Her supernatural short story "Perdita," was published in the March 1897 Harper's Magazine. She wrote biographies of Nathaniel Hawthorne, Henry Wadsworth Longfellow, Ralph Waldo Emerson, Henry David Thoreau, Thomas Paine, Matthew Fontaine Maury, and Oliver Wendell Holmes Sr.

Hawthorne also wrote travel narratives, including Old Seaport Towns of New England (1916), Rambles in Old College Towns (1917), Corsica: The Surprising Island (1926), Romantic Cities of California (1939), and Williamsburg, Old and New (1941).

Hawthorne marched in the 1913 women's suffrage parade in New York City. She lived in California in the 1920s and 1930s.

A collection of ghost stories by Hawthorne, The Faded Garden, was published in 1985, edited by Jessica Amanda Salmonson. Her work is sometimes found in anthologies of American women's writing. Hawthorne co-authored Enos Mills of the Rockies with Esther Burnell Mills.

== Personal life ==
Hildegarde Hawthorne married John Milton Oskison in 1920. She died in 1952, aged 81 years, in Danbury, Connecticut.
