= Society of Colorado Pioneers =

American organization

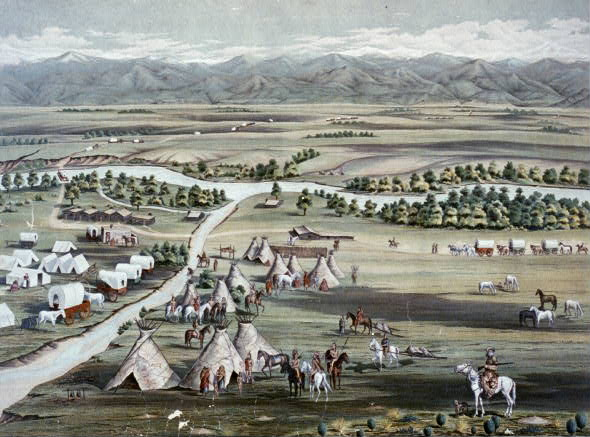
Denver, Colorado in 1859.

The Society of Colorado Pioneers was an American organization. It was formed in 1872 to recognize and support the first Anglo American settlers in Colorado. The organization originally only for men, spun off a woman's auxiliary group and later a sons group. In 1943, the "Society of Colorado Pioneers" was consolidated into the woman's group and became the "Pioneer Men and Women of Colorado".

== Membership ==
The Society of Colorado Pioneers was established to recognize pioneers who came to Colorado before 1861: Men could become full, dues-paying members. Women, who were exempt from dues, could become "honorary members".

Those who settled by 1858 were truly pioneers: "The early pioneer came to a silent wilderness. He took hold of the territory 'in the raw.' He had nothing by his hands, his energy and his courage to start a new civilization in the wilderness". In 1859 and 1860, people began arriving in thousands to settle in the mountains, mining camps or valleys. After 1860, trails were blazed and evidence of civilization had emerged, like newspapers, schools, churches, businesses and other forms of society.

== History ==
The Society of Colorado Pioneers was founded by men to recognize and assist pioneers who arrived prior to 1861, when the area was part of the Kansas territory. The Society was formed on January 16, 1872 and incorporated on July 14, 1884. The first president was Hiram P. Bennett and the first elected chairman was Anselm H. Barker. From 1894 to June 1939, the Society was located at Curtis and 15th in the Charles Block building and then at Glenarm and 17th streets the Johnson Building.

In September 1889, the Woman's auxiliary was organized with 14 members, partly to help meet the Society's goal of assisting pioneers in need. It grew to 150 members in 1894, when it was incorporated. In 1934, it was reincorporated as the Pioneer Women of Colorado.

Sons of pioneers could become members starting in 1906, but were "not eligible to any office in this Society, as long as there is a sufficient member in the present society to fill the respective places". There were some exceptions, depending on the responsibility but the limitations resulted in "Society of Sons of Colorado" establishment in 1906. Society of Sons of Colorado published a monthly magazine called "The Trail: A Magazine "for Colorado" starting June 1908. Restrictions for sons of pioneers were removed within the Society of Colorado by 1921.

In February 1943, the Society had decided to consolidate with the Pioneer Women of Colorado and renamed the organization The Pioneer Men and Women of Colorado; The last meeting of the Society of Colorado Pioneers was held on March 27, 1943.
