= Frederick House River =

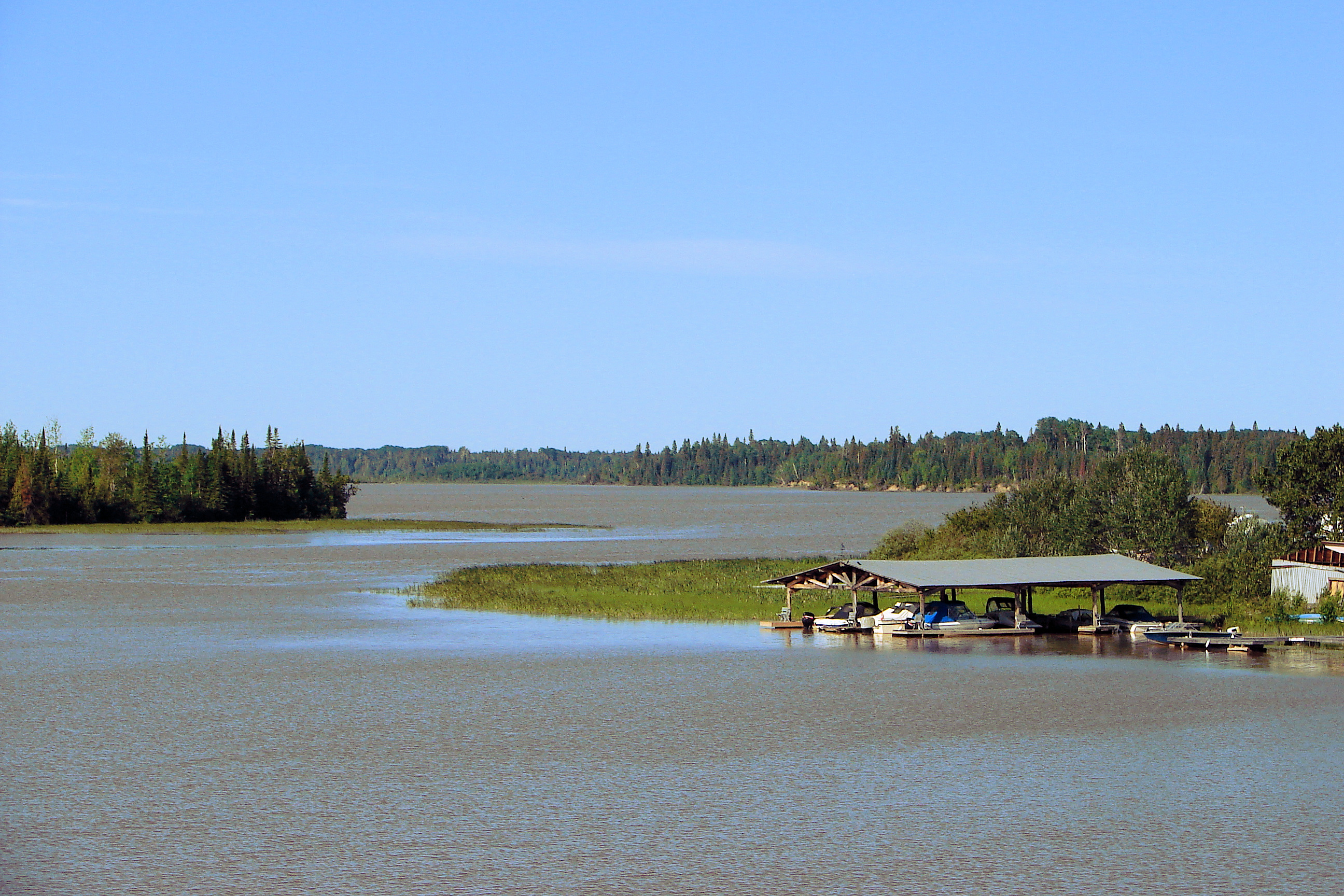
- Frederick House River near Night Hawk Lake

- Location of the mouth of the Frederick House River in Ontario
- Etymology: Named for Prince Frederick, Duke of York and Albany, son of George III of the United Kingdom

Location
- Country: Canada
- Province: Ontario
- Region: Northeastern Ontario
- District: Cochrane
- Municipalities: Unorganized Cochrane North Part, Timmins

Physical characteristics
- Source: Night Hawk Lake
  - location: Timmins
  - coordinates: 48°35′00″N 80°57′00″W
  - elevation: 274 m (899 ft)
- Mouth: Abitibi River
  - coordinates: 49°18′41″N 81°16′53″W
  - elevation: 216 m (709 ft)
- Length: 100 km (62 mi)

Basin features
- River system: James Bay drainage basin
- Tributaries
  - left: Buskegau River
  - right: Wicklow River

The Frederick House River is a river in the James Bay and Moose River drainage basins in Cochrane District in northeastern Ontario, Canada. It flows 100 kilometres (62 mi) from Night Hawk Lake in the city of Timmins to its mouth at the Abitibi River in Cochrane, Unorganized, North Part. Both the river and the associated Hudson's Bay Company Frederick House post (1785–1821) are named for Prince Frederick, Duke of York and Albany, son of George III of the United Kingdom,

== Course ==
The Frederick House River begins at Night Hawk Lake in Timmins at an elevation of 274 metres (899 ft). It flows north into Frederick House Lake at the community of Connaught, near the site of the Hudson's Bay Company Frederick House post, continues north out of the lake into Cochrane, Unorganized, North Part, flows over a small dam and the Wanatango Falls, and takes in the right tributary Wicklow River. It continues north passing along the western border of the town of Cochrane. It flows over the Neelands Rapids, under the Ontario Highway 11 and Ontario Northland Railway (formerly a section of the National Transcontinental Railway) bridges, and over the Sankey Rapids at the community of Frederick. The river takes in the left tributary Buskegau River at the Carter Rapids, continues north, and reaches its mouth as a left tributary of the Abitibi River at an elevation of 216 metres (709 ft).

== Tributaries ==
- Jack Creek (right)
- Deception Creek (left)
- Clute Creek (right)
- Foster Creek (right)
- Buskegau River (left)
- Wicklow River (right)
- Pickerel Creek (right)
- Flint Creek (right)
- Slim Creek (right)
- Night Hawk Lake
  - Forks River
  - Night Hawk River
  - Porcupine River (Ontario)
  - Redstone River (Northeastern Ontario)
  - Whitefish River (Night Hawk Lake)

== Frederick House ==
Frederick House Lake is about 20 miles northeast of Timmins, Ontario, about 5 miles north of Ontario Highway 101 and 5 miles southwest of the Ontario Highway 11 and about 16 miles northwest of the point where the two highways meet. Since the Frederick House River is a north-flowing tributary of the Abitibi, it is somewhat west of the main canoe route from James Bay up the Abitibi River, portage to Lake Timiskaming and down the Ottawa River to Montreal. In June 1784 Philip Turnor was sent from Moose Factory up the Abitibi to establish a post somewhere upriver. His boats proved defective and he was forced to winter at the junction of the Frederick House and Abitibi rivers. Next spring he went up the Frederick House and established a post on the lake where he remained as master until 1787. It was temporarily closed from 1795 to 1798. The post proved difficult to supply because both the Frederick House and Abitibi Rivers are difficult for canoes. Montreal-based traders sent men to divert Indians away from the fort. In January 1812 there was a proposal for the HBC to give up its post on Lake Abitibi in exchange for the Northwest Company's withdrawal from Frederick House. This was not acted upon because of the following. In December 1812 a man called Capascoos murdered everyone at the post (3 Europeans and 9 Indians). He apparently spent the winter there and murdered any arrival that might tell the tale. When two men arrived from another post they found Frederick House deserted and looted. When the snow melted 12 bodies were found. A reward was offered for Capascoos, but he was never caught. The post was never re-built. In 1911 a steam shovel building the Ontario Northland Railway unearthed the remains of the fort and several skeletons were found in shallow graves. The site is said to have been on Barber's Bay, but the southern part of the Lake was drained when the Frederick House River was diverted. There is a marker on highway 101.

== See also ==
- List of rivers of Ontario
