= Buckhorn Creek (Colorado) =

- Location within Colorado

Location
- Country: United States
- State: Colorado
- County: Larimer County, Colorado

Physical characteristics
- Source: Crystal Mountain
  - coordinates: 40°32′2″N 105°28′8″W
- Mouth
  - location: Big Thompson River
  - coordinates: 40°25′15″N 105°10′31″W

Buckhorn Creek, also known as Elk Creek, is a stream at an altitude of 5,089 feet (1,551 m) that runs from Crystal Mountain to the Big Thompson River in Masonville, Colorado in Larimer County, Colorado.
