= Enos Mills =

American naturalist and author (1870–1922)

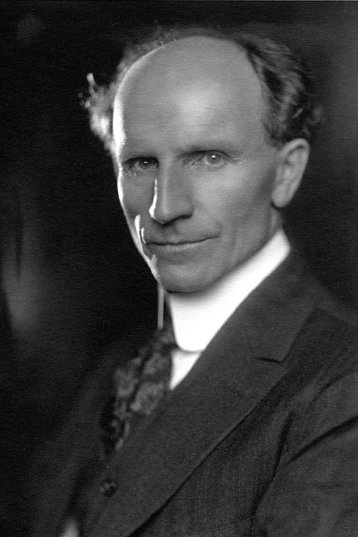
- circa 1915
- Born: Enos Abijah Mills; April 22, 1870; Linn County, Kansas
- Died: September 21, 1922 (aged 52); Colorado
- Occupations: Naturalist, homesteader, and author
- Known for: Leading the establishment of the Rocky Mountain National Park
- Spouse: Esther Burnell

Enos Abijah Mills (April 22, 1870 – September 21, 1922) was an American naturalist, author and homesteader. He was the main figure behind the creation of Rocky Mountain National Park.

He traveled throughout the Rocky Mountains for years, believing he could commune with animals rather than killing them for food or safety. He operated the Longs Peak House as a summer place of respite for writers, publicists, and other intelligentsia. It was considered the Roycroft of the Rocky Mountains. Mills was appointed government lecturer by President Theodore Roosevelt.

Enos Mills was inducted into the Colorado Business Hall of Fame by Junior Achievement and the Rocky Mountain and the Denver Metro Chamber of Commerce in 2016.

== Early life ==
Mills was born on a farm in Linn County, Kansas, about 20 miles (32 km) from Fort Scott, Kansas. (Note: From his family's residences from 1865 to 1885, Mills was very likely born in Linn County, Kansas. The 1865 state census states that Enos and Ann Mills and their children lived in Potosi, Linn County (near Pleasanton). His obituary, published by the Fort Scott newspaper, stated that he was born in Pleasanton, Linn County, Kansas, near the later site of the Mine Creek Battlefield of the Civil War. When Enos was one-month-old and ten years later, he and his parents lived in Sheridan in Linn, Kansas.) (Note: Frances Wayne of the Denver Post states that he was born in Kansas City, Kansas. Mills left for Colorado from Kansas City, having walked there from his parents' house.) Before his birth, his parents, Enos Mills Sr. and Ann Lamb Mills, left Indiana for the Gold Rush in Colorado. The Mills were unsuccessful gold miners, but they later shared their stories of adventure in Colorado with their children. The Mills settled in Kansas before Enos Mills was born. Mills was a frail child, due to stomach problems or tuberculosis, and disappointed his father due to his inability to keep up with the hard labor on the farm. Physicians had a hard time diagnosing Mills illness and when he was age 13, his parents were told he had just 6 months to live. Mills learned how to read, but had a rudimentary education.

Mills had ten brothers and sisters, who are listed in order of birth: Augustus, Elkhanah, Mary, Naomi Victoria, Ruth, Sarah, Ellen, Sabina Isabelle (Belle), Horace, and Enoch Joe.

== Colorado and Montana ==
Mills moved to Colorado in 1884 at the age of 14. Inspired by his parents' stories about Colorado, and having heard that the state's climate could have a therapeutic effect on his health, Mills left home and walked to Kansas City, Kansas where he worked until he earned his railroad fare for Denver. He went to Fort Collins, Colorado and worked for Elkanah Lamb, his cousin, who operated a cattle ranch. During the summer, Lamb led the cattle from the plains to the Longs Peak area.

They [the Rocky Mountains] became his Arabian Nights. He was enthralled by the bright blue skies, the high peaks, the little beavers felling trees and building their homes, the friendly bluebirds and the primeval forests. The boy from Kansas stood awed among the tall and lovely firs and the rainbow of flowers .... What kinds of trees grew on the mountains, what animals lived there, and would they be friendly? He was small and frail and alone, and a head of bright curls made him seem the more childlike. People wondered at his industry and his daring. With no companion at night in the dark woods, was he not afraid? He answered readily, in his childhood English. 'What is there to be afraid of? There are no human beings around.'

— Grace D. Phillips, "Guardian of the Rockies", National Parks Magazine

=== Initial years at Longs Peak ===
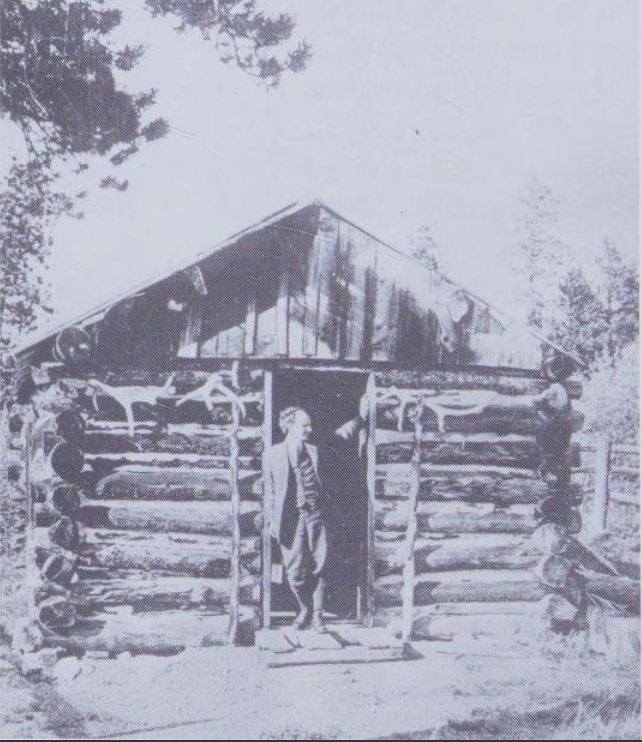
Enos Mills at the door of the cabin he built as a teen (late 1880s) on Longs Peak

At age 15, Mills made his first ascent of Longs Peak. Over the course of his life, he made the trip 40 times by himself and nearly 300 additional times as a guide. He built his homestead near Longs Peak of the Rocky Mountains, 8 miles (13 km) from the town of Estes Park, Colorado completing it at 16. It was located near Lamb's Longs Peak House, a lodge. He studied the flowers, animals, weather, and geology of the area.

Mills left the home base of his cabin throughout the seasons to explore the Rocky Mountains, home to deer, elk, bears, and other wildlife. Believing that he safely communed with birds and wild animals, he traveled without a firearm. He often slept in the light of a camp-fire, waking up periodically to feed the fire. He also woke to the sounds of mountain lions, birds, and other animals in the night. He considered himself lucky to be able to sleep in the open, rather than in stuffy houses of the poor. Unwilling to kill an animal for food, he lived on chocolate and nuts. He read the works of John Muir and John Burroughs, as well as a Bible his mother gave him.

There were "a handful" of settlers in the Longs Peak area. British lady Isabella Bird, artist Albert Bierstadt, and mountain climber and author Frederick H. Chapin were noted visitors. Two hotels served the tourists. Denver was about one day away.

=== Montana and travels ===
In the winter of 1887, he went to Butte, Montana to work as a miner. He did this on the off-season months to earn enough to support himself. He lived part of the year in Montana until 1902. Mills spent some of his summers traveling the West Coast of the United States, Alaska, and Europe. In 1889, he had a chance encounter with famed naturalist John Muir on a San Francisco beach, and from that point on Mills dedicated his life to conservation activism, lecturing, and writing.

Enos filed his homestead application on February 3, 1893, and received his patent on November 16, 1898, for 160 acres in Larimer County, Colorado. (Note: His tract is located in Larimer County, Colorado on the west half of the southwest quarter of section 26 (80 acres) and the west half of the northwest quarter of section 35 (80 acres) of township 4 north and range 73 west of the 6th PM.)

=== Longs Peak Inn ===
In 1902, Mills returned to Colorado and purchased the Longs Peak House, which he renamed Longs Peak Inn, near Estes Park, from Elkanah Lamb. It became a place of respite during the summers for publicists and writers, the intelligentsia of the country. Considered the Roycroft of the Rocky Mountains, some of the visitors promoted the creation of a national park in the Rockies. (Note: His obituary states that he built the lodge.) The inn was located at the beginning of a trail up Long's Peak. Like Lamb and his son Carlyle, Mills was as a professional guide who led increasing numbers of people up the mountain. Mills made the first winter ascent up the peak in 1903. Mills hired and trained nature guides there, who guided many people up Longs Peak and the surrounding area. His methods of nature interpretation are still taught to students in the field of interpretation.

From 1902 to 1906, Mills was a Colorado State Snow Observer, a position in which he measured the snow depths to predict spring and summer runoff. Following this position, he served as the United States government lecturer on forestry from 1907 to 1909.

=== Naturalist and author ===
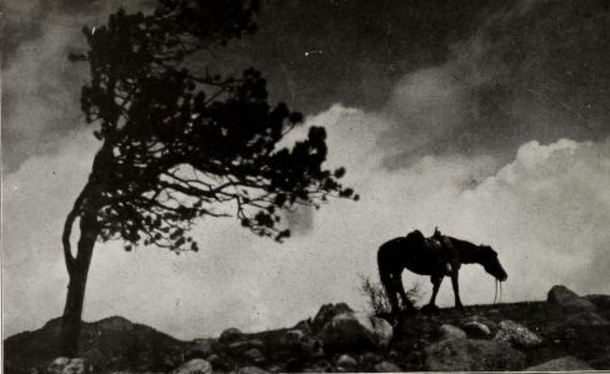
Enos A. Mills, The End of the Trail, published in The National Parks Portfolio, 1921

Mills authored several articles and books on nature and Estes Park area, beginning in the first decade of the 20th century. Inspired by his trips in the wilderness, he wrote books, like Story of a Thousand Year Pine (1909). He wrote about the animals and their habitats, and the geology of the Rocky Mountains. His speeches generally focused on the lives of trees, forestry issues, preservation of natural lands, and the lives of wild animals. Often in his speeches and written articles he encouraged people of all ages to get outside and into nature.

His photographs illustrated the articles that he wrote about Longs Peak. He also wrote poetry. He was appointed government lecturer by President Theodore Roosevelt. Mills lectured and wrote books throughout the rest of his life. He wrote 15 books.

== Rocky Mountain National Park ==
Mills led the fight to preserve the area around Longs Peak as a national park, and used his speeches, his writing, and photography to lobby for the park. His photo of the Estes valley from Mount Olympus, published in Wild Life on the Rockies, is an example of his advocacy. He wanted a park of about 1,000 square miles that would cover the area from Wyoming to Pikes Peak. Mills was aided by the Sierra Club, Daughters of the American Revolution, American Civic Association, the General Federation of Women's Clubs and especially, Freelan Oscar Stanley (founder of the Stanley Hotel). President Woodrow Wilson signed into law the bill that made the Rocky Mountain National Park the tenth national park on January 26, 1915. It was 352.5 square miles. He was called the "Father of Rocky Mountain National Park" by several newspapers published reporting the passage and signing of the Rocky Mountain National Park Act in 1915, including the Denver Post.

== Marriage ==
He married Esther Burnell on August 12, 1918 in Boulder County, Colorado. Their only child, Enda Mills, later Enda Mills Kiley, was born on April 27, 1919.

== Death ==
Mills died at age 52 in 1922. He died in Colorado, at Longs Peak Inn on Longs Peak, from heart failure. Some state that he died of a broken heart, discouraged by the plans for a monopoly to control the transportation of freight and passengers through the park. At the time of his death, he had a brother, William Mills, living in Fort Scott, Kansas and his mother lived in Linn County, Kansas.

His wife, Esther Burnell Mills, was co-author with Hildegarde Hawthorne of the book Enos Mills of the Rockies, which was published in 1935, and which gives the following place names honoring Mills. Mills Lake, and Mills Morraine on Longs Peak, within the Rocky Mountain National Park, were named in his honor.

== Publications ==
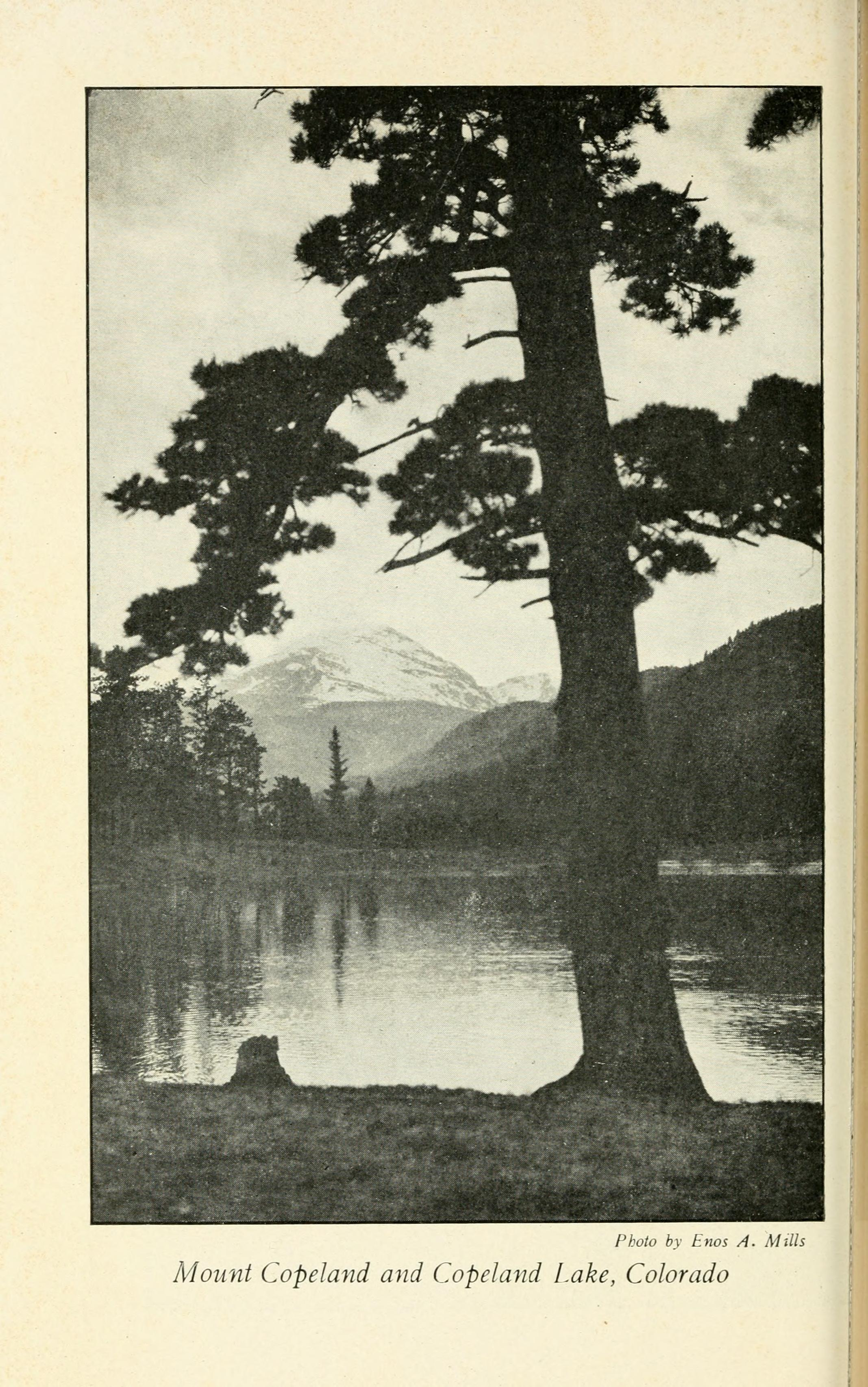
Enos A. Mills, Mount Copeland and Copeland Lake, Colorado, photograph published in The Adventures of a Nature Guide, 1920

- The Story of Estes Park and Guide Book. Denver: Outdoor Life Publishing Company. 1905. LCCN 05016610.
- Wild Life on the Rockies. Boston; New York: Houghton Mifflin Company. 1909. LCCN 09008919.
- The Spell of the Rockies. Boston: Houghton Mifflin Company. 1911. LCCN 11029625.
- The Story of a Thousand Year Pine. Boston: Houghton Mifflin Company. 1909. LCCN 14012822.
- In Beaver World. Boston; New York: Houghton Mifflin Company. 1913. LCCN 13005458.
- The Rocky Mountain Wonderland. Boston; New York: Houghton Mifflin Company. 1915. LCCN 15007322.
- The Story of Scotch. Boston; New York: Houghton Mifflin Company. 1916. LCCN 16018586.
- Your National Parks. Boston; New York: Houghton Mifflin Company. 1917. LCCN 17014711.
- The Grizzly, Our Greatest Wild Animal. Boston; New York: Houghton Mifflin Company. 1919. LCCN 19010216.
- The Adventures of a Nature Guide. Garden City, NY: Doubleday, Page and Company. 1920. LCCN 87893116.
- Waiting in the Wilderness. Garden City, NY and Toronto: Doubleday, Page and Company. 1921. LCCN 21002306.
- Wild Animal Homesteads. Garden City, NY: Doubleday, Page and Company. 1922. LCCN 23026340.
- Watched By Wild Animals. Garden City, NY: Doubleday, Page and Company. 1923. LCCN 42046087.
- The Rocky Mountain National Park. Garden City, NY: Doubleday, Page and Company. 1924. LCCN 24008898.
- Bird Memories of the Rockies. Boston; New York: Houghton Mifflin Company. 1931. LCCN 31019666.

== Bibliography ==
- Jessen, Kenneth Christian (1996). Estes Park : a quick history. Colorado: First Light Publishing. ISBN 978-0-9629380-3-0.
- Wild, Peter; Skov, Arny (illustrator) (1979). Enos Mills, Western Writers Series #36. Boise, Idaho: Boise State University. ISBN 978-0884300601. OCLC 6006498.
