= Redstone River (Northeastern Ontario) =

- Location of the mouth of the Redstone River in Ontario

Location
- Country: Canada
- Province: Ontario
- Region: Northeastern Ontario
- Districts: Cochrane; Timiskaming; Sudbury

Physical characteristics
- Source: Redstone Lake
  - location: Sudbury, Unorganized, North Part, Sudbury District
  - coordinates: 47°59′35″N 81°18′00″W
  - elevation: 366 m (1,201 ft)
- Mouth: Night Hawk Lake
  - location: Timmins, Cochrane District
  - coordinates: 48°27′19″N 81°02′24″W
  - elevation: 274 m (899 ft)
- Length: 87 km (54 mi)

Basin features
- River system: James Bay drainage basin

The Redstone River is a river in the James Bay drainage basin in Cochrane, Timiskaming and Sudbury Districts in northeastern Ontario, Canada. It flows 87 kilometres (54 mi) from Semple Lake to its mouth at Night Hawk Lake, the source of the Frederick House River.

== Course ==
The Redstone river begins at Semple Lake in the northeast of the Unorganized North Part of Sudbury District at an elevation of 366 metres (1,201 ft). It flows southeast to Redstone Lake, then heads northeast through the northwest strip of the Unorganized West Part of Timiskaming District and onward into the city of Timmins in Cochrane District. The river then reaches its mouth at the western side of Night Hawk Lake at an elevation of 274 metres (899 ft). The lake empties via the Frederick House River, the Abitibi River and the Moose River to James Bay.

== Tributaries ==
- Croteau Creek (right)
- Shaw Creek (left)
- Kennedy Creek (left)
- Geikie Creek (right)
- Ferrier Creek (left)

== See also ==
- List of rivers of Ontario
