= Red Stone Creek =

Stream in Jackson County, South Dakota, U.S.

Coordinates: 43°47′03″N 101°21′50″W

Red Stone Creek is a stream in Jackson County in the U.S. state of South Dakota.

Red Stone Creek received its name on account of the reddish soil along the watercourse.

== See also ==
- List of rivers of South Dakota
