= Redstone Creek (Colorado) =

- Location within Colorado

Location
- Country: United States
- State: Colorado
- County: Larimer County, Colorado

Physical characteristics
- Source: Buckhorn Mountain
  - coordinates: 40°37′15″N 105°19′45″W
- Mouth
  - location: Buckhorn Creek
  - coordinates: 40°28′38″N 105°12′30″W

Redstone Creek is a stream at an altitude of 5,282 feet (1,610 m) that runs from Buckhorn Mountain to Buckhorn Creek in Masonville, Colorado in Larimer County, Colorado.
