= Masonville, Colorado =

Unincorporated community in Larimer County, CO, USA

- Unincorporated community
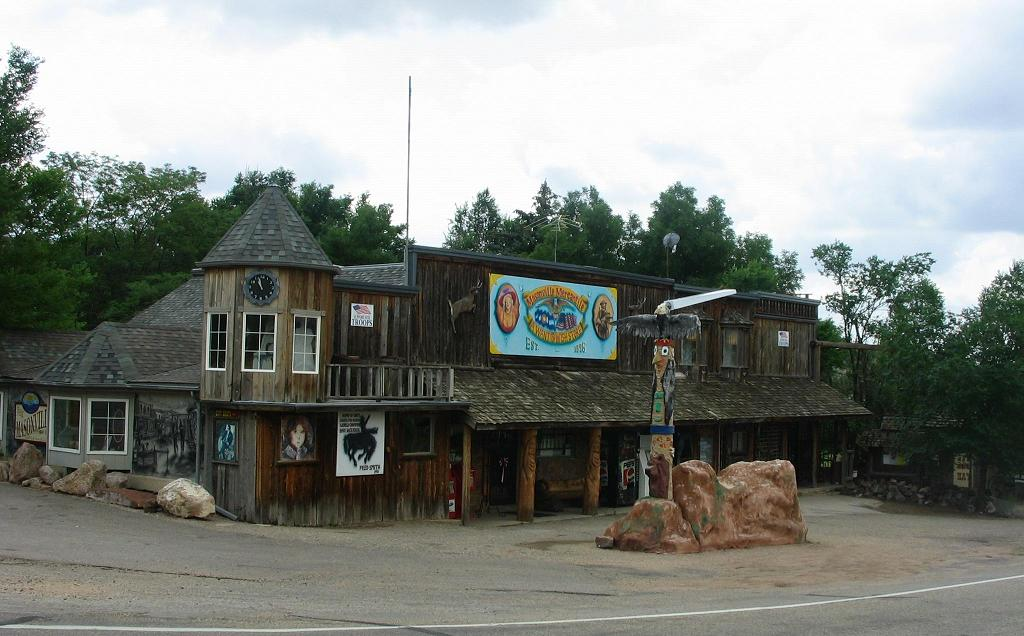
- General store in Masonville

- Location in Colorado Location in the United States
- Coordinates: 40°29′15″N 105°12′39″W
- Country: United States
- State: Colorado
- County: Larimer
- Elevation: 5,391 ft (1,643 m)
- Time zone: UTC-7 (MST)
  - Summer (DST): UTC-6 (MDT)
- ZIP code: 80541
- Area code: 970
- GNIS feature ID: 204676

Masonville is an unincorporated community and a U.S. Post Office in Larimer County, Colorado, United States. The Masonville Post Office has the ZIP Code 80541.
