= Top Girls =

1982 play by Caryl Churchill

- Poster of Royal Court Theatre revival, 1991
- Original language: English
- Written by: Caryl Churchill

Premiere
- Date: 28 August 1982
- Place: Royal Court Theatre, London

Top Girls is a 1982 play by Caryl Churchill. It centres on Marlene, a career-driven woman who is heavily invested in women's success in business. The play examines the roles available to women in old society, and what it means or takes for a woman to succeed. It also dwells heavily on the cost of ambition and the influence of Thatcherite politics on feminism.

Top Girls has been included on a variety of "greatest plays" lists by critics and publications.

== Productions ==
The play premiered at the Royal Court Theatre in London on 28 August 1982. It was directed by Max Stafford-Clark, the Royal Court's artistic director, who has premiered several of Churchill's plays. The cast was Selina Cadell, Lindsay Duncan, Deborah Findlay, Carole Hayman, Lesley Manville, Gwen Taylor and Lou Wakefield.

In December 1982, the Public Theater programmed the play's American debut, with the Royal Court Theatre cast and creative team. Its run would end in 1983 with a cast of North American actresses: Lise Hilboldt (Marlene), Donna Bullock (Jeanine/Waitress/Win), Sara Botsford (Isabella/Joyce/Nell), Freda Foh Shen (Lady Nijo/Mrs. Kidd), Kathryn Grody (Dull Gret/Angie), Linda Hunt (Pope Joan/Louise), and Valerie Mahaffey (Griselda/Shona/Kit).

In 1991, the BBC and Rádio e Televisão de Portugal commissioned a televised production, reuniting Deborah Findlay (as Isabella/Joyce) and Lesley Manville (as Marlene) under Stafford-Clark's direction. The rest of the cast was filled out by Lesley Sharp, Beth Goddard, Sarah Lam, Cecily Hobbs, and Anna Patrick. It first aired in the UK on 2 November 1991 and in the US on 3 November 1992. A radio production with the same cast (directed by Hillary Norrish) aired on the BBC World Service in 1992. These productions coincided with a revival at the Royal Court Theatre and a national tour in the same season.

In 2006, a production ran at the Watford Palace Theatre from 2 to 18 November before transferring to the Greenwich Theatre where it ran from 21 to 25 November. The cast included Rachel Sanders, Zoe Aldrich, Elaine Claxton, Sara Houghton, Emma Pallant, Claire Redcliffe, and Hayley Jayne Standing.

During the 2007–08 New York theatre season, Manhattan Theatre Club presented the play at the Biltmore Theatre in a production starring Mary Catherine Garrison, Mary Beth Hurt, Jennifer Ikeda, Elizabeth Marvel, Martha Plimpton, Ana Reeder, and Marisa Tomei. The production was directed by frequent Churchill collaborator James Macdonald. The MTC production marked the Broadway premiere of Top Girls, though the original Royal Court production had visited New York's Public Theater.

A 2011 revival at Chichester Festival Theatre, co-produced with Out of Joint and directed by the play's original director Max Stafford-Clark transferred to Trafalgar Studios in the West End, opening on 16 August 2011. The cast included Suranne Jones, Stella Gonet, Olivia Poulet, Lucy Briers, Laura Elphinstone, Lisa Kerr and Catherine McCormack. This production toured in the UK in early 2012, with a new cast including Caroline Catz as Marlene.

In 2019, a production was staged at the Royal National Theatre in London, starring Katherine Kingsley, Amanda Lawrence and Siobhan Redmond, and directed by Lyndsey Turner.

== Background ==
Top Girls was written in the background of Margaret Thatcher's election as Britain's first female prime minister and deals with concerns such as Thatcher's right-wing politics, a shift in 1980s Britain from a socialist mindset to a more capitalist one, and the feminine politics of the 1980s. The play has an all-female cast playing complex characters, which has been hailed by critics as the most significant feminist intervention in the patriarchal drama mode. In this play Churchill also developed stylistic technique of overlapping dialogues and non-linear storyline.

== Themes ==
The play is set in the Britain of the early 1980s and examines the issue of what it means to be a successful woman, initially using "historical" characters to explore different aspects of women's "social achievement". Churchill has stated that the play was inspired by her conversations with American feminists: it comments on the contrast between American feminism, which celebrates individualistic women who acquire power and wealth, and British socialist feminism, which involves collective group gain.

There is also commentary on Margaret Thatcher, then prime minister, who celebrated personal achievement and believed in free-market capitalism (Thatcherism). Marlene, the tough career woman, is portrayed as soulless, exploiting other women and suppressing her own caring side in the cause of success. The play argues against the style of feminism that simply turns women into new patriarchs and argues for a feminism in which caring for the weak and downtrodden is more prominent. The play questions whether it is possible for women in society to combine a successful career with a thriving family life.

== Style ==
The play is famous for its dreamlike opening sequence in which Marlene meets famous women from history, including Pope Joan, who, disguised as a man, is said to have been pope between 854 and 856; the explorer Isabella Bird; Dull Gret the harrower of Hell; Lady Nijo, the Japanese mistress of an emperor and later a Buddhist nun; and Patient Griselda, the patient wife from The Clerk's Tale in Geoffrey Chaucer's Canterbury Tales. All of these characters behave like a gang of city career women out on the town and get increasingly drunk and maudlin, as it is revealed that each has suffered in similar ways.

The stories of the historical women parallel the characters in the modern-day story. For example, Bird, like Marlene, got to where she was by leaving her sister to deal with family matters. Dull Gret's monosyllabic inarticulacy is comparable to Angie's. Some of these parallels are emphasised by the actors doubling the roles of the historical and modern characters.

The structure of the play is unconventional (non-linear). In Act I, scene 1, Marlene is depicted as a successful businesswoman, and all her guests from different ages celebrate her promotion in the 'Top Girls' employment agency. In the next scene we jump to the present day (early 1980s) where we see Marlene at work in the surprisingly masculine world of the female staff of the agency, in which the ladies of 'Top Girls' must be tough and insensitive in order to compete with men. In the same act, the audience sees Angie's angry, helpless psyche and her loveless relationship with Joyce, whom the girl hates and dreams of killing. Only in the final scene, which takes place a year before the office scenes, does the audience hear that Marlene, not Joyce, is Angie's mother. This notion, as well as the political quarrel between the sisters shifts the emphasis of the play and formulates new questions.

== Characters ==
The life stories of the dinner guests externalise Marlene's thoughts and anxieties over the choices that she has made in her own life and the alternatives, e.g. whether it was the right choice to give up her child in order to be successful.

- Marlene
- Isabella Bird
- Pope Joan
- Lady Nijo
- Dull Gret
- Patient Griselda
- Joyce
- Angie
- Win
- Kit
- Nell
- Mrs. Kidd
- Louise
- Shona
- Jeanine

=== Pope Joan ===
Pope Joan is one of Marlene's dinner party guests in act 1, scene 1, and the fourth to arrive. Pope Joan is somewhat aloof, making relevant, intellectual declarations throughout the conversation. When the topic turns to religion, she cannot help but point out heresies—herself included—though she does not attempt to convert the others to her religion. Joan reveals some of her life. She began dressing as a boy at age twelve so she could continue to study; she lived the rest of her life as a man, though she had male lovers. Joan was eventually elected pope. She became pregnant by her chamberlain lover and delivered her baby during a papal procession. For this, Joan was stoned to death. At the end of the scene, Joan recites a passage in Latin. Like all the dinner guests, Joan's life and attitude reflect something about Marlene; in particular how she had to give up her female body in order to "succeed" in her time.

=== Dull Gret ===
The subject of the painting Dulle Griet by Pieter Breughel, in which a woman wearing an apron and armed with tools of male aggression – armor, helmet, and sword – leads a mob of peasant women into Hell, fighting the devils and filling her basket with gold cups. In the play she eats crudely and steals bottles and plates when no one is looking, putting these in her large apron. Throughout most of the dinner scene, Dull Gret has little to say, making crude remarks such as "bastard" and "big cock". Her rare speech is coarse, reductive and amusing while her relative silence adds an element of suspense up to the point where she recounts the tale of her invasion.

=== Lady Nijo ===
Lady Nijo is a thirteenth-century Japanese concubine who enters the play near the beginning of act one and proceeds to tell her tale. As the most materialistic of the women, she is influenced more by the period of time before she became a wandering nun than by the time she spent as a holy woman. It may be suggested that it is her social conditioning that Churchill is condemning, not her character, as she is brought up in such a way that she cannot even recognize her own prostitution. She is instructed by her father to sleep with the emperor of Japan and reflects on it positively; she feels honored to have been chosen to do so when discussing it with Marlene in Act 1. In relation to Marlene, this may suggest that Marlene, like Lady Nijo, has not questioned the role given to her by society and merely played the part despite the consequences; as she does whatever it takes to be successful in an individualistic business environment.

=== Patient Griselda ===
Patient Griselda is one of Marlene's dinner guests in act one. She is the last to arrive, so Marlene and the other characters in the scene order without her. Historically, Griselda first came into prominence when Chaucer adapted her (from earlier texts by Boccaccio) for a story in The Canterbury Tales called "The Clerk's Tale." In Chaucer's tale, and also in Top Girls, Griselda is chosen to be the wife of the Marquis, even though she is only a poor peasant girl. The one condition that he gives her is that she must promise to always obey him.

After they have been married for several years, Griselda gives birth to a baby girl. When the baby turns six weeks old the Marquis tells Griselda that she has to give it up, so she does. Four years later Griselda gives birth to a son. She has to also give this child up after two years because it angers the other members of the court. Twelve years after she gave up her last child, the Marquis tells her to go home, which she does. The Marquis then comes to Griselda's father's house and instructs her to start preparing his palace for his wedding. Upon her arrival, she sees a young girl and boy and it is revealed that these are her children. All of this suffering was a trial to test her obedience to the Marquis.

When she recounts her tale at dinner with the other women it appears in an accurate but slightly shortened form. Griselda says that she understands her husband's need for complete obedience, but it would have been nicer if he had not done what he did. She spends much of her time defending her husband's actions against Lady Nijo's accusations concerning his character.

=== Isabella Bird ===
Isabella Bird is the first dinner guest to arrive at Marlene's celebration. In real life, as discussed in the first act, Bird was a world traveler. The play does not mention that she wrote several books, including An English Woman In America, A Lady's Life in the Rocky Mountains, and Among the Tibetans. Her adventures took her around the world. At dinner, Bird tells everyone that she was first instructed to travel by a doctor who thought it would improve her poor health. Following this advice, she took her first trip, a sea voyage to America at age 23. For a long time, she lived with her mother and her younger sister, Henrietta Bird, whom she talks about with great affection during the dinner party. She also mentions Jim Nugent, a one-eyed mountain man who was her guide in the Rocky Mountains. In life, Nugent was in love with Bird but she ignored his advances. She reasons to her friends during the dinner in Act One: "He is a man any woman might love, but no sane woman would marry." Nugent would later be found murdered.

Of the dinner guests, Bird seems to have the most in common with Marlene. Bird, like Marlene, did not marry young because of her career, but later married John Bishop, who died two days before their fifth anniversary. She refers to him as "my dear husband the doctor" but, despite her love for her husband, is still disappointed with marriage itself ("I did wish marriage had seemed more of a step"). Bird gets the last words in act 1 and continues to discuss her final travels to Morocco.

== Plot synopsis ==
The play opens in a restaurant, where Marlene is waiting for some friends to arrive. She is throwing a dinner party to celebrate her promotion at the employment agency where she works. As the women arrive and start the meal, they begin to talk about their lives and what they did. Each of her guests is a historical, fictional or mythical woman who faced adversity and suffered bitterly to attain her goals. Lady Nijo recalls how she came to meet the ex-Emperor of Japan, and her encounter with him. While the rest of the women understand the encounter as rape, she explains that she saw it as her destiny: the purpose for which she was brought up. Within the context of Pope Joan's narrative, the women discuss religion. At this point the waitress, who punctuates the scene with interruptions, has already brought the starter and is preparing to serve the main courses. All the women except Marlene discuss their dead lovers. They also recall the children that they bore and subsequently lost. Nijo's baby was of royal blood, so he couldn't be seen with her. Pope Joan was stoned to death when it was discovered that she had given birth and was therefore female and committing heresy. Griselda was told that her two children had been killed, in a cruel test of her loyalty to her husband. After dessert, the women sit drinking brandy, unconsciously imitating their male counterparts.

In Act One, Scene Two, Marlene is at the agency where she works, interviewing a girl named Jeanine. Marlene takes a fancy to her even though she seems lost and helpless. She doesn't know what type of job she wants—only that she wants to travel and be with her husband.

Act Two, Scene One begins with two girls, Angie and Kit, playing in Angie's backyard. Angie is abrasive and argumentative with both her friend and her mother, Joyce. She and Kit fight and Angie says she is going to kill her mother. Kit doesn't believe her, and they start to talk about sex. Angie accuses Kit's mother of sleeping around, but it becomes apparent that neither of them know what they are talking about; Kit is only 12 and Angie is quite immature for her sixteen years.

In Act Two, Scene Two, the action turns to the "Top Girls" employment agency, where Nell and Win are sharing the latest office gossip, until Marlene arrives. They then express their congratulations to Marlene for getting the top job.

Win meets Louise, a client who after conscientiously working for many years at the same firm is deciding to quit. She slowly opens up to Win, describing how she had dedicated her life to her job, working evenings at the expense of her social life, without reward. She has found herself at 46, with no husband or life outside of work, in a position where she trains men who are consistently promoted over her.

The action then switches to Marlene's office where Angie arrives, having taken the bus from Joyce's house in the country. She is shy and awkward and her presence is clearly an unwelcome surprise to Marlene, who nevertheless offers to let Angie stay at her place overnight. They are interrupted by Mrs. Kidd, the wife of Howard, who was passed up for promotion in favor of Marlene. Mrs. Kidd tells Marlene how much the job means to her husband, how devastated he is, and questions whether she should be doing a 'man's job'. It becomes clear that she is asking Marlene to step down and let her husband have the job instead, which Marlene firmly declines to do. She tries to clear Mrs. Kidd out of her office, but Mrs. Kidd only becomes more insistent until Marlene finally asks her to "please piss off".

Lights shift to Shona arriving in Nell's office looking for job opportunities. At first Nell is impressed by her surprisingly accomplished resume, but quickly figures out that Shona is underaged and making it all up as she goes.

At the same time, Angie is having a conversation with Win about Angie's aunt and Win's life, but falls asleep in the middle of Win's story. Nell comes in with the news that Howard has had a heart attack. Marlene is informed but is unperturbed, and Nell responds "Lucky he didn't get the job if that's what his health's like".

The final act takes place a year earlier in Joyce's kitchen. Marlene, Joyce and Angie share stories with each other. Angie is very happy that her Aunt Marlene is there, since she looks up to her and thinks that she is wonderful. Shortly before Angie goes to bed, Marlene pulls a bottle of whiskey out of her bag to drink with Joyce. As they drink, they discuss what is to become of Angie. With brutal honesty, Joyce tells Marlene that Angie is neither particularly bright nor talented and it is unlikely that she will ever make anything of herself. Marlene tries to brush this off, saying that Joyce is just running Angie down, as this sober reality contradicts Marlene's conservative mentality. It is revealed that Angie is actually Marlene's daughter, whom she abandoned to Joyce's care, causing Joyce to lose the child she was carrying from the stress.

The play ends with Angie calling for her Mum towards Marlene. It is unclear how much Angie heard of Joyce and Marlene's argument.

== Legacy ==
Top Girls was nominated for 'Best Play' at the 1982 Standard Drama Awards, although it was noted that the play "drew compliments rather than committed votes" from the judging panel.

In his review of the 1983 Royal Court production of the play, The Guardian critic Michael Billington stated that he was convinced that Top Girls "is the best British play ever from a woman dramatist. That is not meant to be patronising". He later in 1997 included the play in his list of the "10 best British plays of the [20th] Century". In 2015, Billington selected the play for his list of the "101 greatest plays" ever written in any western language. In 2016, he also included Top Girls in his list of "Ten great Royal Court plays", where he described the play as the "supreme achievement" of Max Stafford-Clark's era as artistic director of The Royal Court.

In 1997, the playwright Mark Ravenhill wrote that Top Girls "must be the best play of the past 20 years".

In 1998, the critic David Benedict named Top Girls as his favourite "play of the [20th] century" writing that "Caryl Churchill's stunningly moving study of the enticements of power and the contradictions we are forced to face was groundbreaking in its reworking of the basic dramatic rules governing time, manner and place. It was also utterly alive to the world in which she was writing and remains so today."

The play was voted as one of the 100 most significant plays of the 20th century as part of a poll which was given to over "800 playwrights, actors, directors, theatre professionals and arts journalists" and conducted by the Royal National Theatre as part of their NT2000 project to celebrate the new millennium.

In 2002, The Guardian published an article written by the critic Lyn Gardner about the enduring relevance of Top Girls as the play was being revived in the West End 20 years after its initial premiere. In the article Gardner stated that Top Girls "can still lay claim to being one of the finest postwar British plays. With its postmodern approach to structure, chronology and, most obviously, language, including dialogue that interrupts and overlaps, it is certainly one of the most influential." She also wrote that the play's opening dinner party scene is "one of the most famous scenes in modern drama".

Top Girls is listed as one of the 100 "best and most influential plays" performed in Britain from 1945 – 2010 in the book and iPad app Played in Britain: Modern Theatre in 100 Plays.

In 2012, critic Benedict Nightingale included Top Girls in his list of Great Moments in the Theatre, writing that many of Churchill's plays "seize and startle, asking key questions in dramatically daring ways, but none more than that modern classic, Top Girls."

In 2013, Top Girls made Entertainment Weekly's list of the "50 Greatest Plays of the Past 100 Years".

Also in 2013, Top Girls was featured in Lucy Kerbel's book of 100 Great Plays for Women. Kerbel had written the book in response to many of her theatre colleagues saying that "There just aren't any good plays for women". Kerbel stated that this phrase was often "delivered like a universal truth: no, with the exception of Caryl Churchill's Top Girls, no one in the history of playwrighting had managed to deliver a single decent play that had more parts for women than men".

In 2014, Top Girls was ranked by The Daily Telegraph as one of the 15 greatest plays ever written.

In 2018, Top Girls was included in The Times's list of "The greatest plays of all time".

In 2019, Methuen Drama conducted a public poll to decide which of their published plays should be re-issued as part of a special edition boxset that would commemorate 60 years of publishing play-texts in their Modern Plays series. The poll consisted of a shortlist of Methuen’s plays for each decade since 1960, with voters being asked to determine which play was "the most representative" of the decade in which it premiered. Out of a shortlist of nine plays from the 1980s Top Girls received the most votes. As a result, the play-text of Top Girls was re-issued as a limited-edition hardback with a foreword by Ann McFerran.

Aleks Sierz in his review of the 2019 National Theatre revival of the play wrote that "[Caryl Churchill has] a back-catalogue [of plays] which is stuffed full of contemporary classics, and a handful of masterpieces... Top Girls, is her masterpiece of masterpieces. Yes, it’s that good. It proves, if proof were needed, that she is clearly the best living British playwright."

== Bibliography ==
- Top girls, Samuel French, Inc., 1982, ISBN 9780573630231
