= List of peaks named Olympus =

Olympus is a popular mountain name, given to several peaks on Earth and one on Mars.

== Europe ==
Mountains called Olympus (Όλυμπος) in Greek antiquity, located on the Greek mainland (notably Mount Olympus in Thessaly) and Mount Olympus (Cyprus), as well as on Aegean and Mediterranean islands, and in Anatolia:

Name	Elevation	Range	Country	Coordinates	Detail
Mount Olympus (Thessaly) historically also Mount Belus	2919 m 9,577 ft	Pindus	Greece	40°05′0″N 22°21′0″E	
Mysian Olympus also Bithynian Olympus, Uludağ	2543 m 8,343 ft	Uludağ	Turkey	40°04′14″N 29°13′18″E	
Lycian Olympus also Phoenicus, Tahtalı Dağı	2366 m 7,762 ft	Taurus Mountains	Turkey	36°32′13″N 30°26′31″E	
Mount Olympus (Cyprus) also Chionistra Χιονίστρα	1952 m 6,404 ft	Troodos Mountains	Cyprus	34°56′N 32°52′E	
Mount Olympus (Ionia) also Nif Dağı	1510 m 4,954 ft		Turkey	38°18′N 27°1′E	
Mount Olympus (Euboea)	1172 m 3,845 ft		Greece	38°29′N 23°52′E	
Olympus (Lesbos)	968 m 3,176 ft		Greece	39.0725°N 26.3534°E	
Laureotic Olympus (Attica) also Attic Olympus	487 m 1,598 ft		Greece	37.753°N 23.931°E	

== North America ==
Name	Elevation	State/Province	County	Country	Coordinates	Detail
Mount Olympus	2897 m 9,505 ft	Alberta		Canada	52.4833°N 117.9097°W	Jasper National Park
Mount Olympus	675 m 2,215 ft	California	San Diego	United States	33.4112°N 117.1024°W	
Mount Olympus	171 m 561 ft	California	San Francisco	United States	37.7633°N 122.4455°W	Buena Vista neighborhood
Mount Olympus	2678 m 8,786 ft	Colorado	Larimer	United States	40.3749°N 105.4617°W	Roosevelt National Forest
Mount Olympus also Awāwaloa	748 m 2,454 ft	Hawaii	Honolulu	United States	21.3358°N 157.7785°W	
Mount Olympus (Kentucky)	362 m 1,188 ft	Kentucky	Bath	United States	38.0438°N 83.6466°W	
Mount Olympus	2747 m 9,012 ft	Utah	Salt Lake	United States	40.6566°N 111.7709°W	Wasatch Front
Mount Olympus	2417 m 7,930 ft	Washington	Jefferson	United States	47.8013°N 123.7106°W	Olympic National Park

== Southern Hemisphere ==
Name	Elevation	Continent	Range	Country	Coordinates	Detail
Mount Olympus (Antarctica)	2400 m 7,874 ft	Antarctica	Britannia Range	Ross Dependency	80.2116°S 156.7739°E	A rectangular, flat, ice-covered mountain.
Mount Olympus (Tasmania)	1472 m 4,829 ft	Oceania	Tasmania	Australia	42°02′24″S 146°06′36″E	Located in the Cradle Mountain-Lake St Clair National Park in Tasmania.
Mount Olympus-East Peak (Tasmania)	1449 m 4,754 ft	Oceania	Tasmania	Australia	42°02′43″S 146°07′05″E	Located in the Cradle Mountain-Lake St Clair National Park in Tasmania.

== Mars ==
Name	Elevation	Coordinates	Detail
Olympus Mons	27,000 m 89,000 ft	18.4°N 226°E	An extinct volcano on Mars and the largest known mountain in the Solar System.

== See also ==
- Olympic Mountains, Pacific Northwest of the United States
