= James Nugent =

James Nugent may refer to:

- James Nugent (priest) (1822–1905), Roman Catholic priest
- James Nugent (Estes Park) (died 1874), known as "Rocky Mountain Jim", resident of Estes Park
- James E. Nugent (1922–2016), Texas politician
