= Estes Park, Colorado =

Statutory town in Larimer County, Colorado, United States

- Statutory town
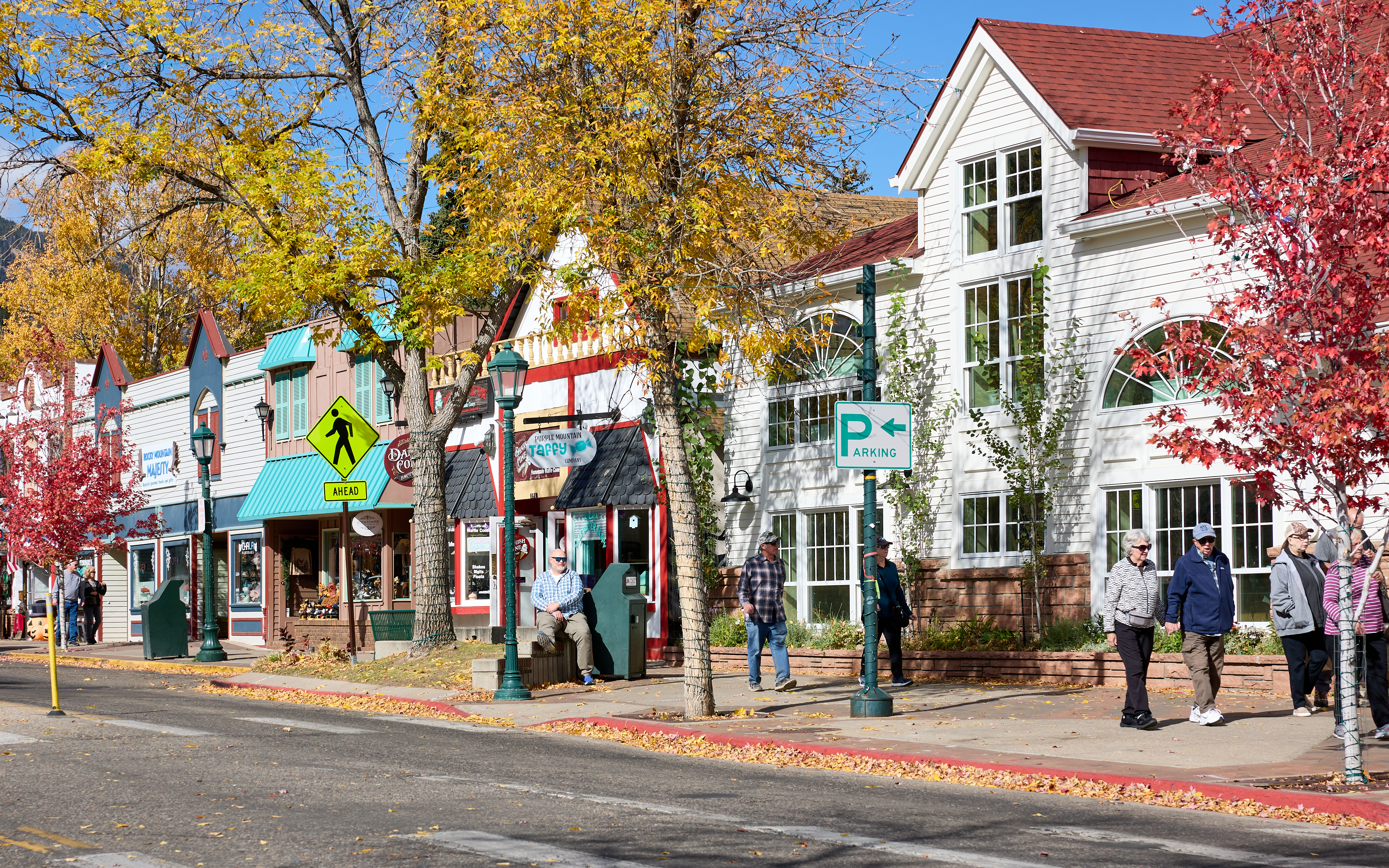
- West Elkhorn Avenue in downtown Estes Park

- Flag Logo

- Location of the Town of Estes Park in Larimer County, Colorado
- Coordinates: 40°22′51″N 105°31′20″W
- Country: United States
- State: Colorado
- County: Larimer
- Settled: 1859
- Incorporated: April 17, 1917

Government
  - Type: Statutory town

Area
  - Statutory town: 6.897 sq mi (17.862 km^{2})
  - Land: 6.822 sq mi (17.668 km^{2})
  - Water: 0.075 sq mi (0.194 km^{2})
- Elevation: 7,743 ft (2,360 m)

Population (2020)
  - Statutory town: 5,904
  - Density: 865/sq mi (334/km^{2})
  - Metro: 359,066 (151st)
  - Front Range: 5,055,344
- Time zone: UTC−07:00 (MST)
  - Summer (DST): UTC−06:00 (MDT)
- ZIP code: 80517
- Area codes: 970/748
- GNIS town ID: 2412603
- FIPS code: 08-25115
- Website: estespark.colorado.gov

Estes Park (/ˈɛstɪs/) is a statutory town in southwestern Larimer County, Colorado, United States. The town population was 5,904 at the 2020 United States census. Estes Park is a part of the Fort Collins, CO Metropolitan Statistical Area and the Front Range Urban Corridor. A popular summer resort and the location of the headquarters for Rocky Mountain National Park, Estes Park lies along the Big Thompson River. Landmarks include The Stanley Hotel and The Baldpate Inn. The town overlooks Lake Estes and Olympus Dam.

== History ==
=== Early history ===
Before Europeans came to the Estes Valley, the Arapaho Native Americans lived there in the summertime and called the valley "the Circle." When three elderly Arapahoes visited Estes Park in 1914, they pointed out sites they remembered from their younger days. A photograph at the Estes Park Museum identified the touring party as Shep Husted, guide; Gun Griswold, a 73-year-old judge; Sherman Sage, a 63-year-old chief of police; Tom Crispin, 38-year-old reservation resident and interpreter; Oliver W. Toll, recorder; and David Robert Hawkins, a Princeton student.

In the 1850s, the Arapaho had spent summers camped around Mary's Lake, where their rock fireplaces, tipi sites, and dance rings were still visible. They also recalled building eagle traps atop Longs Peak to get the war feathers coveted by all tribes. They remembered their routes to and from the valley in detail, naming trails and landmarks. They pointed out the site of their buffalo trap, and described the use of dogs to pack meat out of the valley. Their recollections included a battle with Apaches in the 1850s, and fights with Utes who came to the area to hunt bighorn sheep, so all three of those tribes used the valley's resources.

The town is named after Missouri native Joel Estes, who founded the community in 1859 in what was then the Territory of Nebraska. Estes moved his family there in 1863. One of Estes' early visitors was William Byers, a newspaper editor who wrote of his attempted ascent of Longs Peak in 1864, publicizing the area as a pristine wilderness.

Griff Evans and his family came to Estes Park in 1867 to act as caretakers for the former Estes ranch. Recognizing the potential for tourism, he began building cabins to accommodate travelers. It became a dude ranch in Estes Park, with guides for hunting, fishing, and mountaineering; when Isabella Bird arrived in 1873, Evans already had nine men and women as guests.

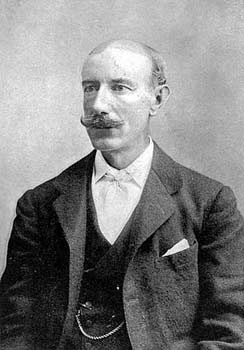
Lord Dunraven (1841–1926), the famous Irish nobleman, politician and journalist, in later life. His ancestral seat was Adare Manor in County Limerick.

The 4th Earl of Dunraven and Mount-Earl, a young Anglo-Irish peer, arrived in late December 1872 under the guidance of Texas Jack Omohundro, subsequently made numerous visits, and decided to take over the valley for his own private hunting preserve. Lord Dunraven's 'land grab' didn't work, but he controlled 6,000 acres before he changed tactics and opened the area's first resort, the Estes Park Hotel, which was destroyed by fire in 1911.

Bird, the daughter of an Anglican minister, came overland to Colorado, where she borrowed a horse and set out to explore the Rocky Mountains with a guide, the notorious James Nugent, aka 'Rocky Mountain Jim'. She wrote A Lady's Life in the Rocky Mountains, a memoir of their travels, including the breathtaking ascent of Longs Peak, where she was literally hauled up the steep pitches "like a bale of goods."

On June 19, 1874, Rocky Mountain Jim and neighbor Griff Evans (see above) had an argument. Having had bitter history with each other, Nugent and Evans hated each other and were deep personal rivals when it came to tour guiding tourists. The argument escalated until Evans blasted Jim in the head with his rifle. Evans then traveled to Fort Collins to file an assault charge against Nugent, but he was arrested and tried for first degree murder when Jim Nugent died on September 9, 1874, of the bullet wound. Evans was put on trial, but the case was soon dismissed due to the lack of witnesses to the shooting. On August 9, 1875, the Loveland court-house acquitted Evans of any charges in the case.

William Henry Jackson photographed Estes Park in 1873.

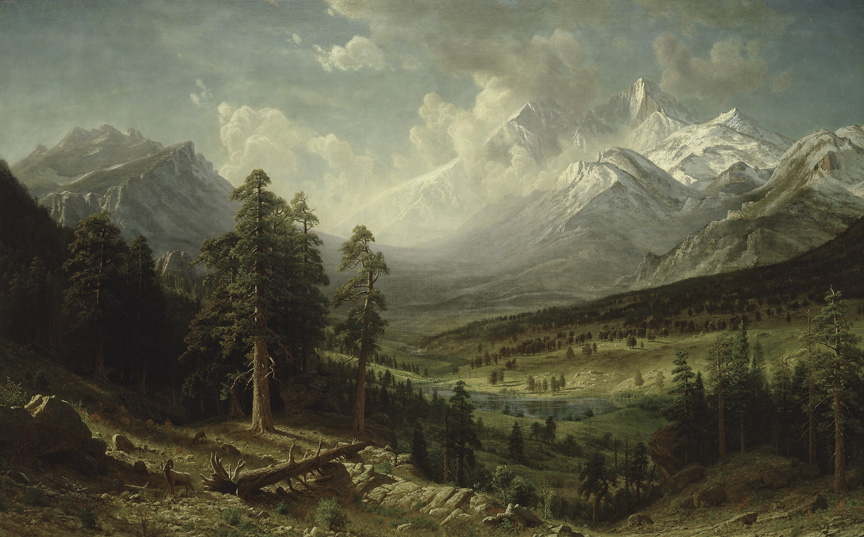
Albert Bierstadt was commissioned by The 4th Earl of Dunraven and Mount-Earl to make a painting of the Estes Park and Longs Peak area in 1876 for $15,000. The painting, originally displayed in Dunraven Castle in Glamorgan, is now in the collection of the Denver Art Museum.

Alex and Clara (Heeney) MacGregor arrived soon after and homesteaded at the foot of Lumpy Ridge. The MacGregor Ranch has been preserved as a historic site. In 1874, MacGregor incorporated a company to build a new toll road from Lyons, Colorado, to Estes Park. The road became what is today U.S. Highway 36. Before that time, however, the "road" was only a trail fit for pack horses. The improved road brought more visitors into Estes Park; some of them became full-time residents and built new hotels to accommodate the growing number of travelers. The Estes Park, Colorado Territory, post office opened on June 2, 1876.

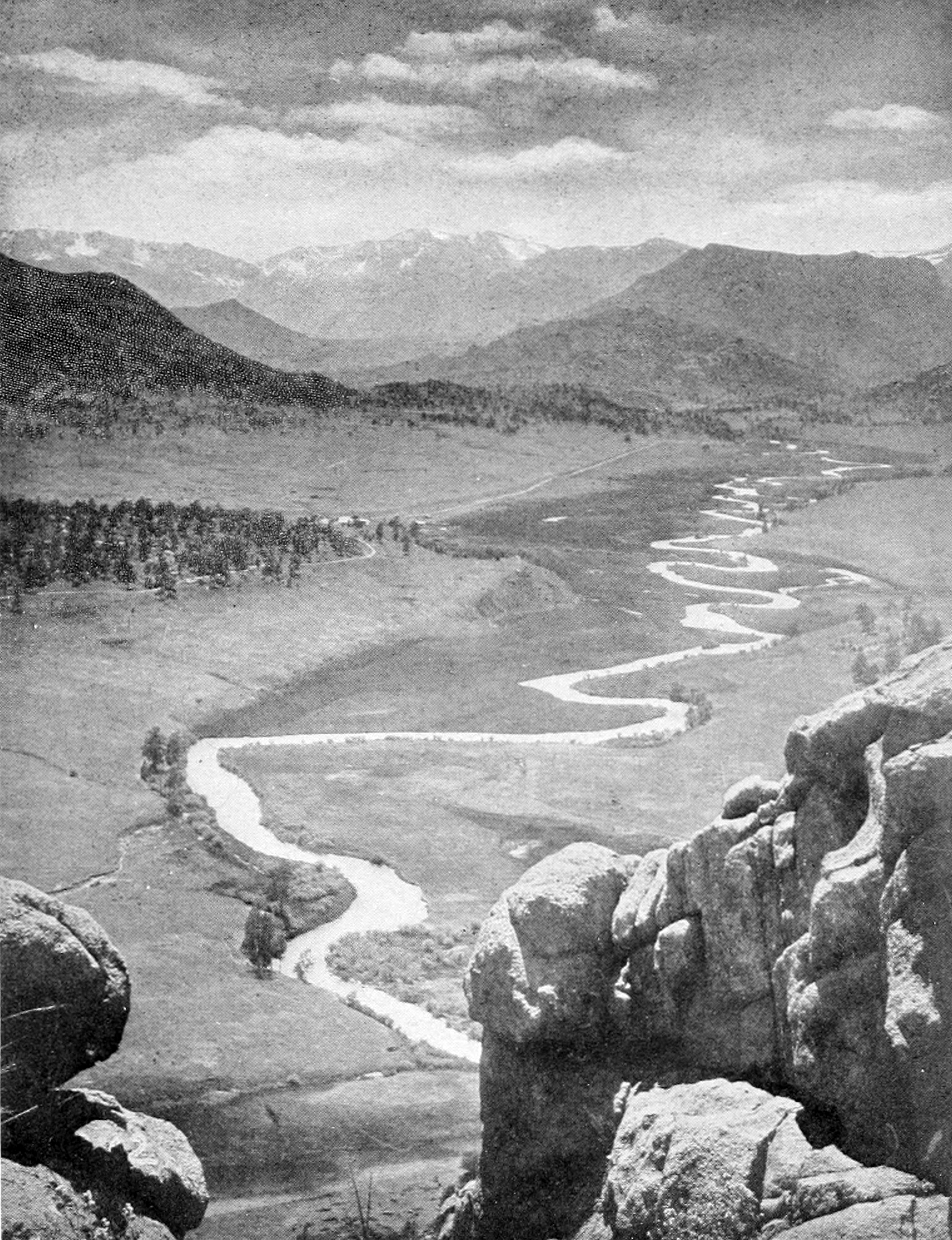
The Estes Valley photographed by Enos Mills from Mount Olympus in 1909.

In 1884, Enos Mills (1870–1922) left Kansas and came to Estes Park, where his relative Elkanah Lamb lived. That move proved significant for Estes Park because Mills became a naturalist and conservationist who devoted his life after 1909 to preserving nearly a thousand square miles of Colorado as Rocky Mountain National Park. His advocacy is exemplified in his book Wild Life on the Rockies which includes his 1909 photo and description of the valley from Mount Olympus. He succeeded and the park was dedicated in 1915.

Enos Mills' younger brother Joe Mills (1880–1935) came to Estes Park in 1889. He wrote a series of articles about his youthful experiences for Boys Life which were later published as a book. After some years as a college athletics coach, he and his wife returned to Estes Park and built a hotel called The Crags on the north side of Prospect Mountain, overlooking the village. They ran that business in the summer while he continued his coaching career in winters at University of Colorado in Boulder.

Many early visitors came to Estes Park in search of better health. The Rocky Mountain West especially attracted those with pulmonary diseases, and in Estes Park some resorts catered to them, providing staff physicians for their care.

=== Recent history ===
In 1903, a new road was opened from Loveland through the Big Thompson River canyon to Estes Park, increasing access to the valley. In 1907, three Loveland men established the first auto stage line from Loveland to Estes Park with three five-passenger touring Stanley Steamers. The following year, Mr. Stanley built nine-passenger steam busses and opened a bus line between Lyons and Estes Park.

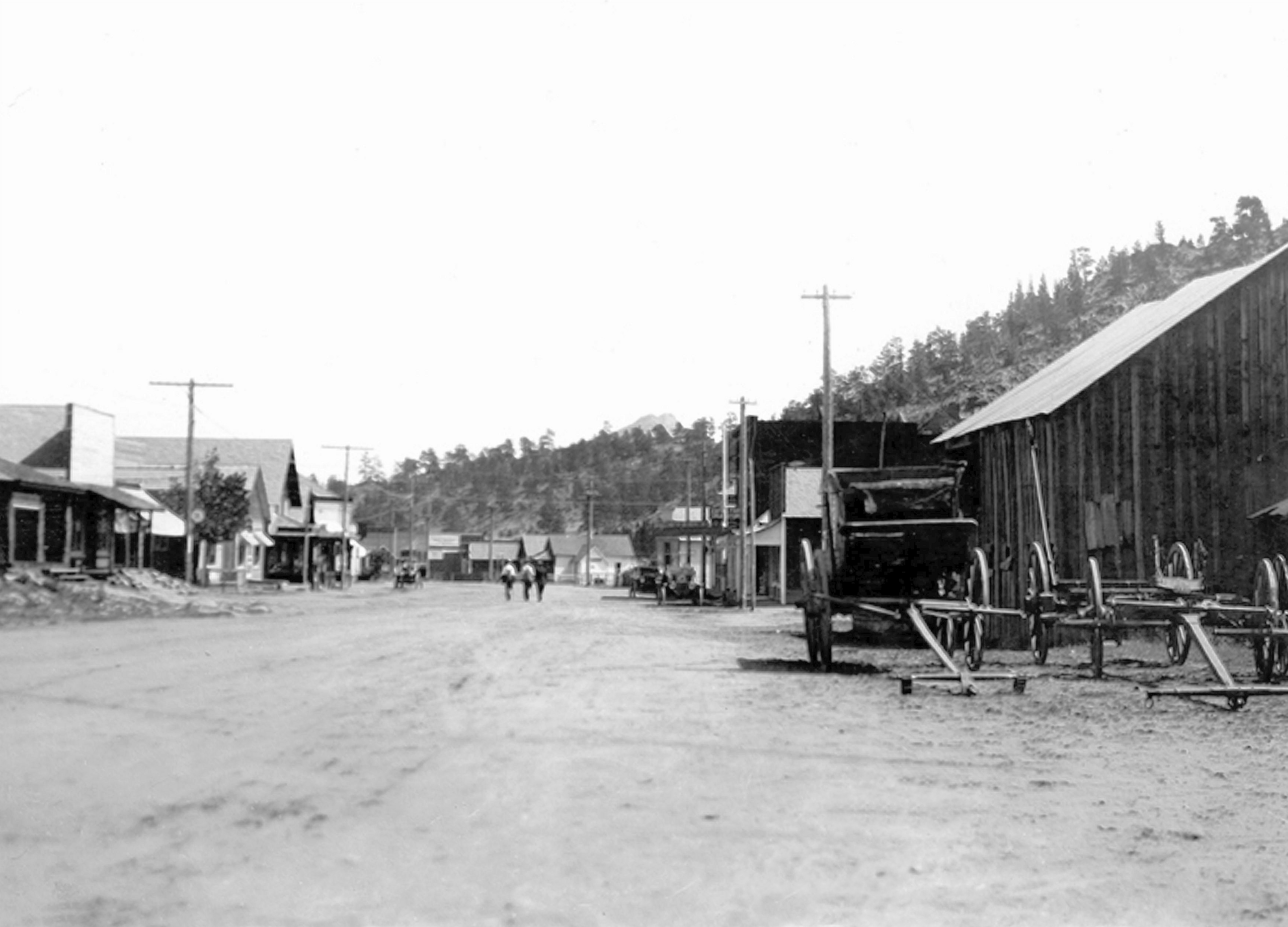
Main Street, 1912

By 1912, Estes Park had its own seasonal newspaper, the Estes Park Trail, which provided advertising for the local hotels and other businesses. It was a year-round weekly by 1921. In 1949, Olympus Dam was finished, creating Lake Estes, giving the town its main source of drinking water.

Land was still being homesteaded in the area in 1914, when Katherine Garetson (1877–1963) filed on land near the base of Longs Peak. She built a cabin and started a business known as the Big Owl Tea Place. She proved up on her homestead claim in 1915, and left a memoir of her years there.

In 1916 the Estes Valley Library was founded by the Estes Park Women's Club. It originally formed part of the old schoolhouse and contained only 262 printed works. The Town of Estes Park was incorporated on April 17, 1917.

Estes Park was also the site of the organization of the Credit Union National Association, an important milestone in the history of American credit unions. In 1992, members of the modern American militia movement attended the three-day Rocky Mountain Rendezvous in Estes Park, which focused on "guns, resisting the federal government, and white supremacy".

=== Major flooding events ===
==== Flood of 1982 ====
The town suffered severe damage in July 1982 from flooding caused by the failure of Lawn Lake Dam, "after years of disrepair and neglect." The flood's alluvial fan can still be seen on Fall River Road. The downtown area was extensively renovated after the flood, and a river walk was added between the main street, Elkhorn Avenue, and the Big Thompson River.

==== Flood of 2013 ====
Both U.S. Highway 36 and U.S. Highway 34, the major routes into town, were severely damaged. Hundreds of Estes Park residents were also isolated by the destruction of sections of Fish Creek Road and all nine crossings across Fish Creek. Damaged sewer lines dumped raw sewage down the creek and into the Big Thompson River.

== Geography ==
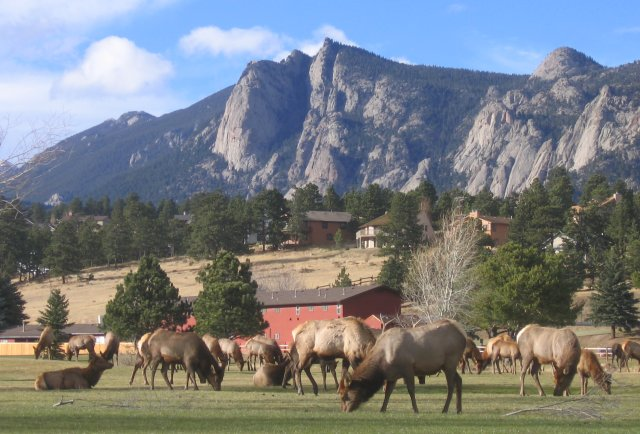
Estes Park Golf Course

Estes Park sits at an elevation of 7,743 feet (2,360 m) on the Front Range of the Rocky Mountains at the eastern entrance of the Rocky Mountain National Park. Its north, south and east extremities border the Roosevelt National Forest. Lumpy Ridge lies immediately north of Estes Park.

At the 2020 United States census, the town had a total area of 4,414 acres (17.862 km^{2}) including 48 acres (0.194 km^{2}) of water.

=== Climate ===
Estes Park has a humid continental climate (Koppen: Dfb). Summers are typically warm, sometimes hot, while winters are usually cold, with lows dropping into the teens and sometimes the single digits.

Climate data for Estes Park 3 SSE, Colorado, 1991–2020 normals, extremes 2001–2021
Month	Jan	Feb	Mar	Apr	May	Jun	Jul	Aug	Sep	Oct	Nov	Dec	Year
Record high °F (°C)	60 (16)	57 (14)	69 (21)	74 (23)	85 (29)	93 (34)	94 (34)	91 (33)	89 (32)	79 (26)	66 (19)	59 (15)	94 (34)
Mean maximum °F (°C)	50.6 (10.3)	51.4 (10.8)	61.1 (16.2)	68.0 (20.0)	76.1 (24.5)	87.1 (30.6)	88.3 (31.3)	85.6 (29.8)	82.0 (27.8)	71.5 (21.9)	60.4 (15.8)	51.5 (10.8)	89.4 (31.9)
Mean daily maximum °F (°C)	37.1 (2.8)	37.5 (3.1)	45.0 (7.2)	51.5 (10.8)	61.2 (16.2)	73.9 (23.3)	80.2 (26.8)	77.7 (25.4)	69.6 (20.9)	56.6 (13.7)	44.1 (6.7)	36.2 (2.3)	55.9 (13.3)
Daily mean °F (°C)	26.6 (−3.0)	26.6 (−3.0)	33.1 (0.6)	38.8 (3.8)	47.9 (8.8)	58.3 (14.6)	64.2 (17.9)	62.0 (16.7)	54.4 (12.4)	43.4 (6.3)	33.8 (1.0)	26.3 (−3.2)	42.9 (6.1)
Mean daily minimum °F (°C)	16.1 (−8.8)	15.8 (−9.0)	21.2 (−6.0)	26.1 (−3.3)	34.7 (1.5)	42.6 (5.9)	48.2 (9.0)	46.4 (8.0)	39.2 (4.0)	30.2 (−1.0)	23.5 (−4.7)	16.4 (−8.7)	30.0 (−1.1)
Mean minimum °F (°C)	−7.5 (−21.9)	−7.2 (−21.8)	3.3 (−15.9)	12.6 (−10.8)	21.1 (−6.1)	35.5 (1.9)	42.6 (5.9)	39.1 (3.9)	28.9 (−1.7)	13.1 (−10.5)	3.1 (−16.1)	−7.1 (−21.7)	−13.1 (−25.1)
Record low °F (°C)	−19 (−28)	−27 (−33)	−18 (−28)	−3 (−19)	6 (−14)	28 (−2)	36 (2)	31 (−1)	20 (−7)	−10 (−23)	−20 (−29)	−22 (−30)	−27 (−33)
Average precipitation inches (mm)	0.82 (21)	0.68 (17)	1.58 (40)	2.26 (57)	2.27 (58)	1.37 (35)	2.55 (65)	1.71 (43)	1.65 (42)	1.12 (28)	0.74 (19)	0.67 (17)	17.42 (442)
Average snowfall inches (cm)	9.8 (25)	13.3 (34)	18.8 (48)	19.3 (49)	9.5 (24)	0.0 (0.0)	0.0 (0.0)	0.0 (0.0)	0.5 (1.3)	9.1 (23)	11.0 (28)	12.7 (32)	104.0 (264)
Average precipitation days (≥ 0.01 in)	6.3	9.3	8.9	10.1	12.4	9.4	14.1	13.4	8.8	7.3	6.0	6.9	112.9
Average snowy days (≥ 0.1 in)	7.4	10.3	9.5	8.0	3.7	0.1	0.0	0.0	0.3	3.8	5.8	8.6	57.5
Source: NOAA (mean maxima and minima 2006–2020)

=== Historic ski areas ===
Estes Park was home to a number of now defunct ski areas:

- Davis Hill
- Hidden Valley
- Leydman Hill Jump
- Old Man Mountain

Estes Park vicinity was also the home of other resorts and tourist attractions.

== Demographics ==
Historical population
Census	Pop.	Note	%±
1930	417		—
1940	994		138.4%
1950	1,617		62.7%
1960	1,175		−27.3%
1970	1,616		37.5%
1980	2,703		67.3%
1990	3,184		17.8%
2000	5,413		70.0%
2010	5,858		8.2%
2020	5,904		0.8%
2023 (est.)	5,824	▼	−1.4%
U.S. Decennial Census

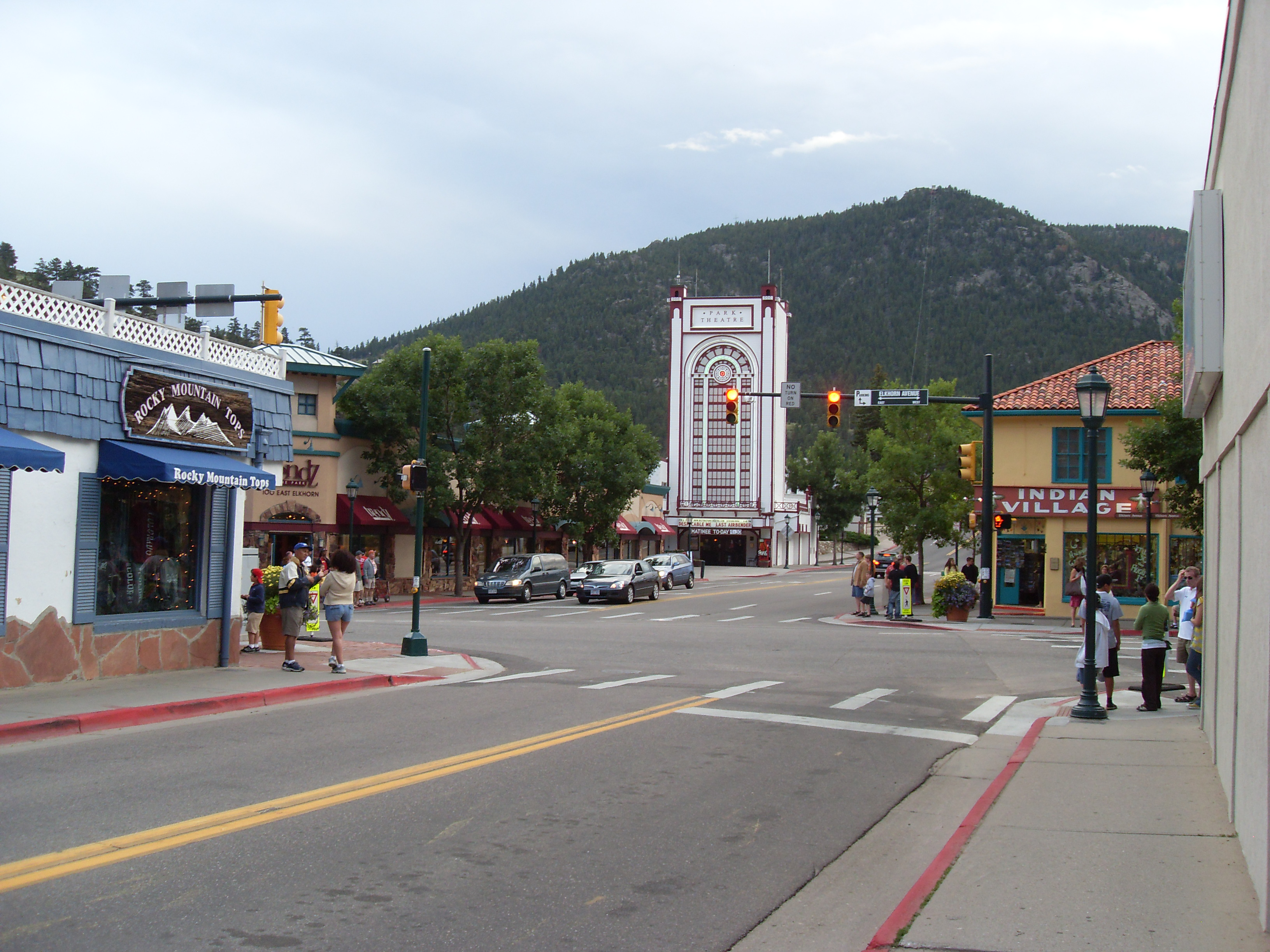
Estes Park city center

In August 1900, Estes Park had a population of 218 in 63 households. Many (73) were born in Colorado. Eighteen were born in other countries: Canada (4), England (4), Germany (4), Finland (3), and one each from the Netherlands, Scotland, and Ireland. Eighty had been born in midwestern states, and thirty from states in the northeast.

=== 2020 census ===
As of the 2020 census, Estes Park had a population of 5,904. The median age was 55.5 years. 14.4% of residents were under the age of 18 and 34.5% of residents were 65 years of age or older. For every 100 females there were 90.7 males, and for every 100 females age 18 and over there were 88.1 males age 18 and over.

98.3% of residents lived in urban areas, while 1.7% lived in rural areas.

There were 2,791 households in Estes Park, of which 17.8% had children under the age of 18 living in them. Of all households, 49.9% were married-couple households, 17.3% were households with a male householder and no spouse or partner present, and 28.3% were households with a female householder and no spouse or partner present. About 34.0% of all households were made up of individuals and 18.6% had someone living alone who was 65 years of age or older.

There were 4,378 housing units, of which 36.2% were vacant. The homeowner vacancy rate was 1.4% and the rental vacancy rate was 12.5%.

Racial composition as of the 2020 census
Race	Number	Percent
White	4,836	81.9%
Black or African American	30	0.5%
American Indian and Alaska Native	33	0.6%
Asian	101	1.7%
Native Hawaiian and Other Pacific Islander	4	0.1%
Some other race	371	6.3%
Two or more races	529	9.0%
Hispanic or Latino (of any race)	906	15.3%

=== 2010 census ===
As of the census of 2010, 5,858 people, 2,796 households, and 1,565 families resided in the town of Estes Park. The population density was 929.5 inhabitants per square mile (358.9/km^{2}). There were 4,107 housing units at an average density of 570.6 per square mile (220.3/km^{2}). The racial makeup of the town was 91.0% White, 0.3% African American, 0.5% Native American, 1.2% Asian, 2% Pacific Islander, 5.5% from other races, and 1.4% from two or more races. Hispanic or Latino of any race were 14% of the population.

=== 2000 census ===
There were 2,541 households, out of which 20.5% had children under the age of 18 living with them, 52.3% were married couples living together, 6.6% had a female householder with no husband present, and 38.4% were non-families. 31.0% of all households were made up of individuals, and 9.7% had someone living alone who was 65 years of age or older. The average household size was 2.11 and the average family size was 2.61.

In the town, the population was spread out, with 17.6% under the age of 18, 5.8% from 18 to 24, 26.6% from 25 to 44, 29.4% from 45 to 64, and 20.7% who were 65 years of age or older. The median age was 45 years. For every 100 females, there were 92.2 males. For every 100 females age 18 and over, there were 90.7 males.

The median income for a household in the town was $43,262, and the median income for a family was $55,667. Males had a median income of $31,573 versus $20,767 for females. The per capita income for the town was $30,499. About 3.2% of families and 4.5% of the population were below the poverty line, including 4.6% of those under age 18 and 0.8% of those age 65 or over.

== Local attractions ==
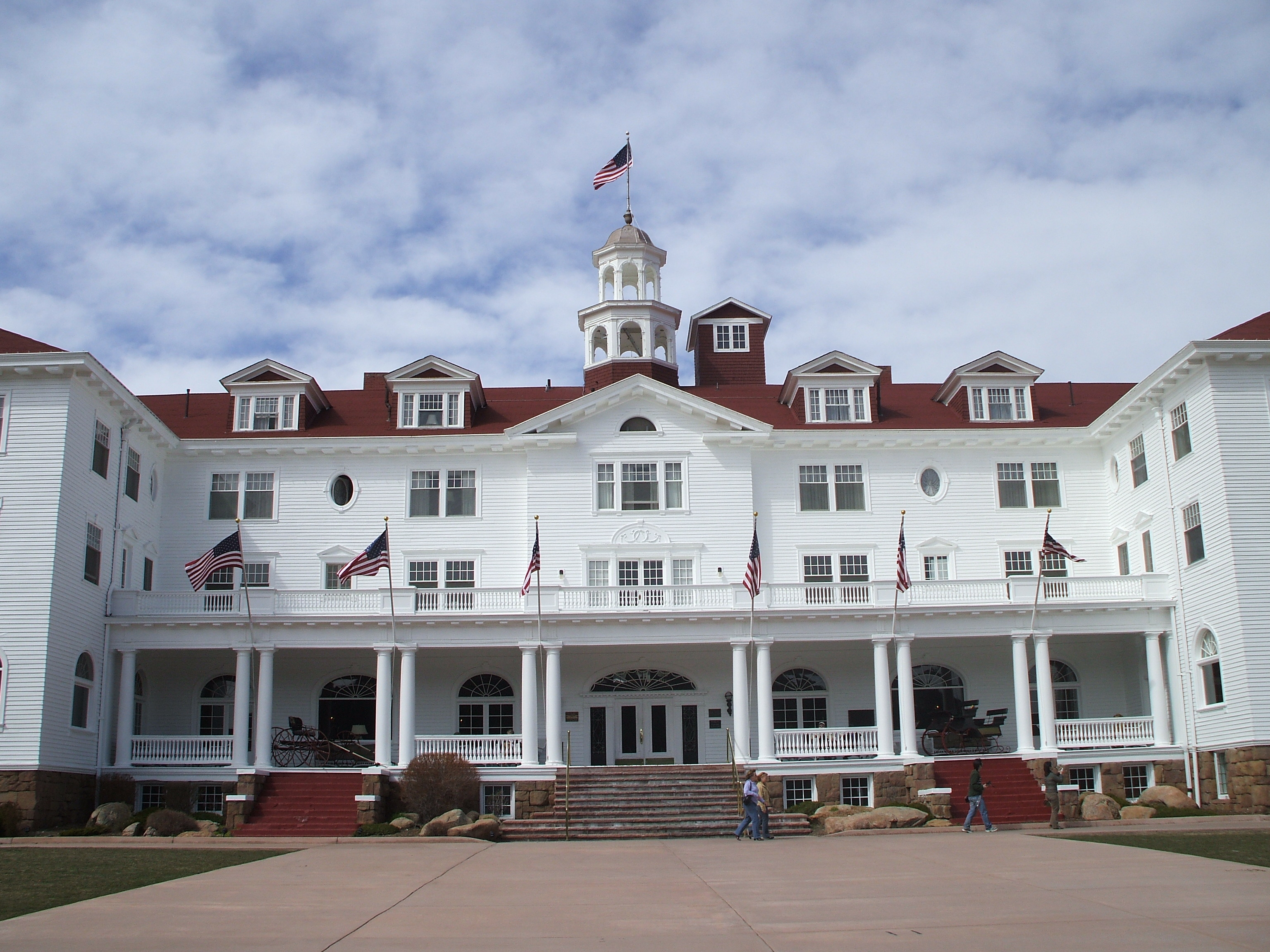
The historic Stanley Hotel, which opened in 1909.

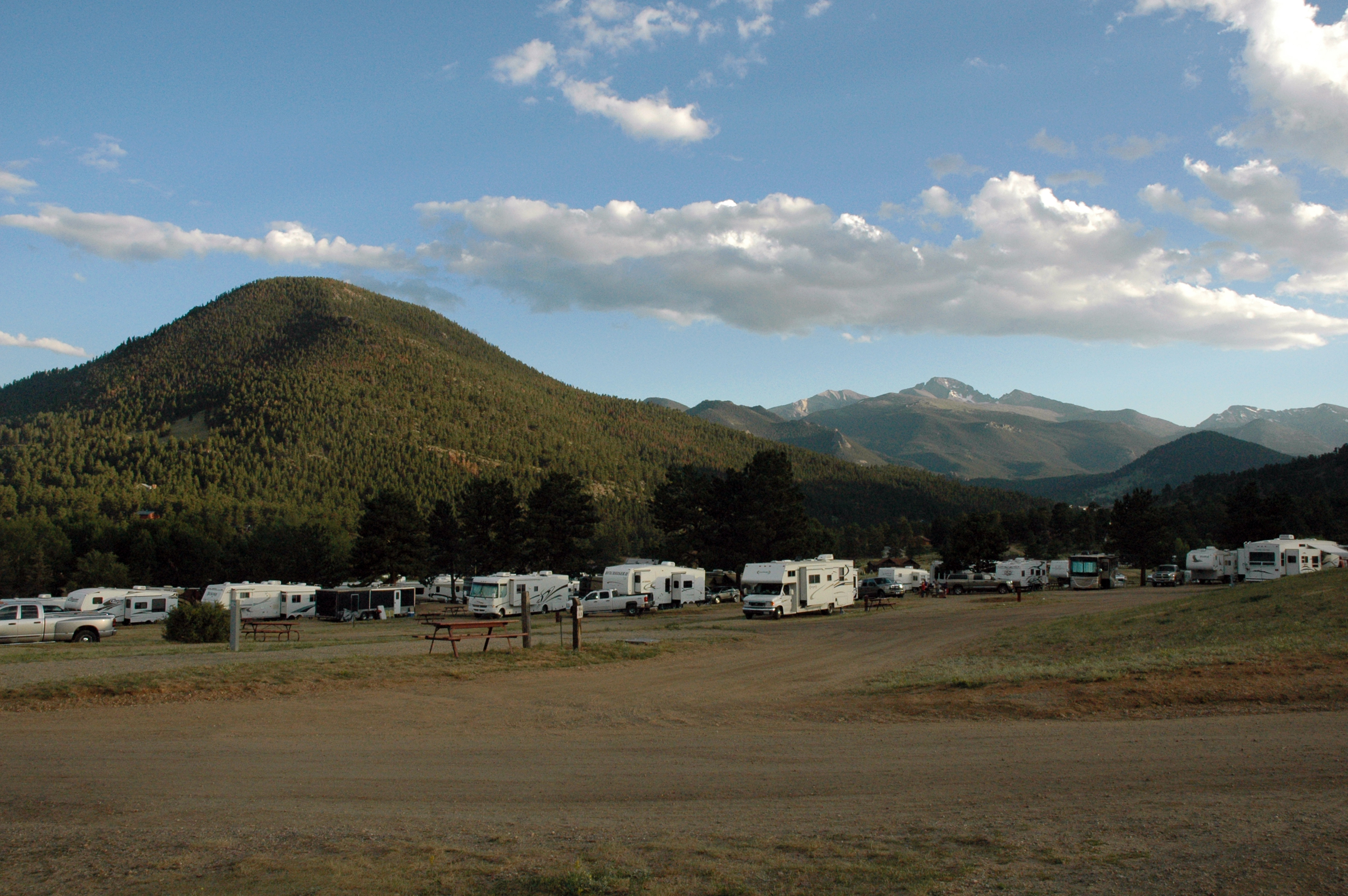
One of several campgrounds in and around Estes Park, popular with tourists who visit Rocky Mountain National Park.

Estes Park's outskirts include The Stanley Hotel, built in 1909. An example of Edwardian opulence, the hotel continues to provide overnight accommodation to guests to this day, offering a broad range of activities and events including daily history and ghost tours of the hotel & the Cascades Restaurant and Whiskey Bar.

On May 21, 2021 the Mustang Mountain Coaster opened in Estes Park on the Sombrero Ranch. Built and operated by the Walker family the coaster demonstrates a diversification of outdoor adventures provided by the ranch whilst ensuring the protection of the natural landscape and is touted as the only mountain coaster located in relatively close proximity to the Denver, Boulder and Fort Collins area.

Opening to the public in July, 1955 the Estes Park Aerial Tramway carries passengers from the outskirts of Estes Park to the summit of Prospect Mountain, boasting a ridership of over 3 million. The Tramway was built and operated by the Heron family until March 21, 2024. Controlling interest in the Tramway was sold to Gondola Ventures who reopened and have been operating the Tramway since May 25, 2024.

Olympus Dam, on the outskirts of the town, is the dam that creates Lake Estes, a lake which is the site for boating and swimming in Estes Park. There are some hotels on the shore.

Roughly three to four million tourists visit Rocky Mountain National Park each year, with 2021 seeing 4.4 million tourist visits; most use Estes Park as their base. In the spring and fall, wapiti travel through the town on their migrations to and from the national park.

== Infrastructure ==
=== Transportation ===
Trail Ridge Road, the highest continuous highway in the United States with a maximum elevation of 12,183 feet (3,713 m), runs from Estes Park westward through Rocky Mountain National Park, reaching Grand Lake over the continental divide.

==== Public transportation ====
The main airport serving Estes Park is Denver International Airport, located 75 miles southeast. Service between the airport and Estes Park is provided by local carriers.

The town of Estes Park operates Estes Transit, a free shuttle during the summer months.

==== Highways ====
- US 34 is an east–west highway that runs from Granby, Colorado to Berwyn, Illinois. In Colorado, it connects Estes Park to Loveland, Interstate 25, Greeley and Interstate 76.
- US 36 begins at the nearby Rocky Mountain National Park, running to Uhrichsville, Ohio, passing through Kansas, Missouri, Illinois and Indiana. It connects Estes Park to Boulder, and Interstates 25 and 76, both near Denver.
- State Highway 7 begins at the junction of US 36 and N St. Vrain Avenue in Estes Park and runs to Boulder, Lafayette and Brighton. Its northwestern segment is part of the Peak to Peak Scenic Byway.

== Notable people ==
- Jacob M. Appel, author, wrote The Mask of Sanity while living in Estes Park
- Tommy Caldwell, rock climber
- Jim Detterline, climber, resident of the Estes Park–Allenspark area at the time of his death
- Tom Hornbein, mountaineer who was part of the U.S. expedition that climbed Mt. Everest in 1963.
- Wendy Koenig, American middle-distance runner. She served as the mayor of Estes Park from 2020 to 2024.
- Loren Shriver, astronaut, commander on the Space Shuttle mission that launched the Hubble Telescope
- Freelan Oscar Stanley, inventor of the Stanley Steamer and builder of the Stanley Hotel
- William Ellery Sweet, 23rd Governor of Colorado, built a summer home in Estes Park in 1912
- Anna Wolfrom, pioneer homesteader and teacher, first successful businesswoman in Estes Park

== In popular culture ==
- Several scenes from the 1978 Centennial miniseries were filmed in various locations around Estes Park, particularly around Lily Lake.

== Sister city ==
Estes Park's official sister city is Monteverde, Costa Rica.

== See also ==
- Fort Collins, CO Metropolitan Statistical Area
- Front Range Urban Corridor
- Big Thompson River
- Cheley Colorado Camps
- Rocky Mountain National Park
