= Mount Olympus (Colorado) =

Mountain near Estes Park

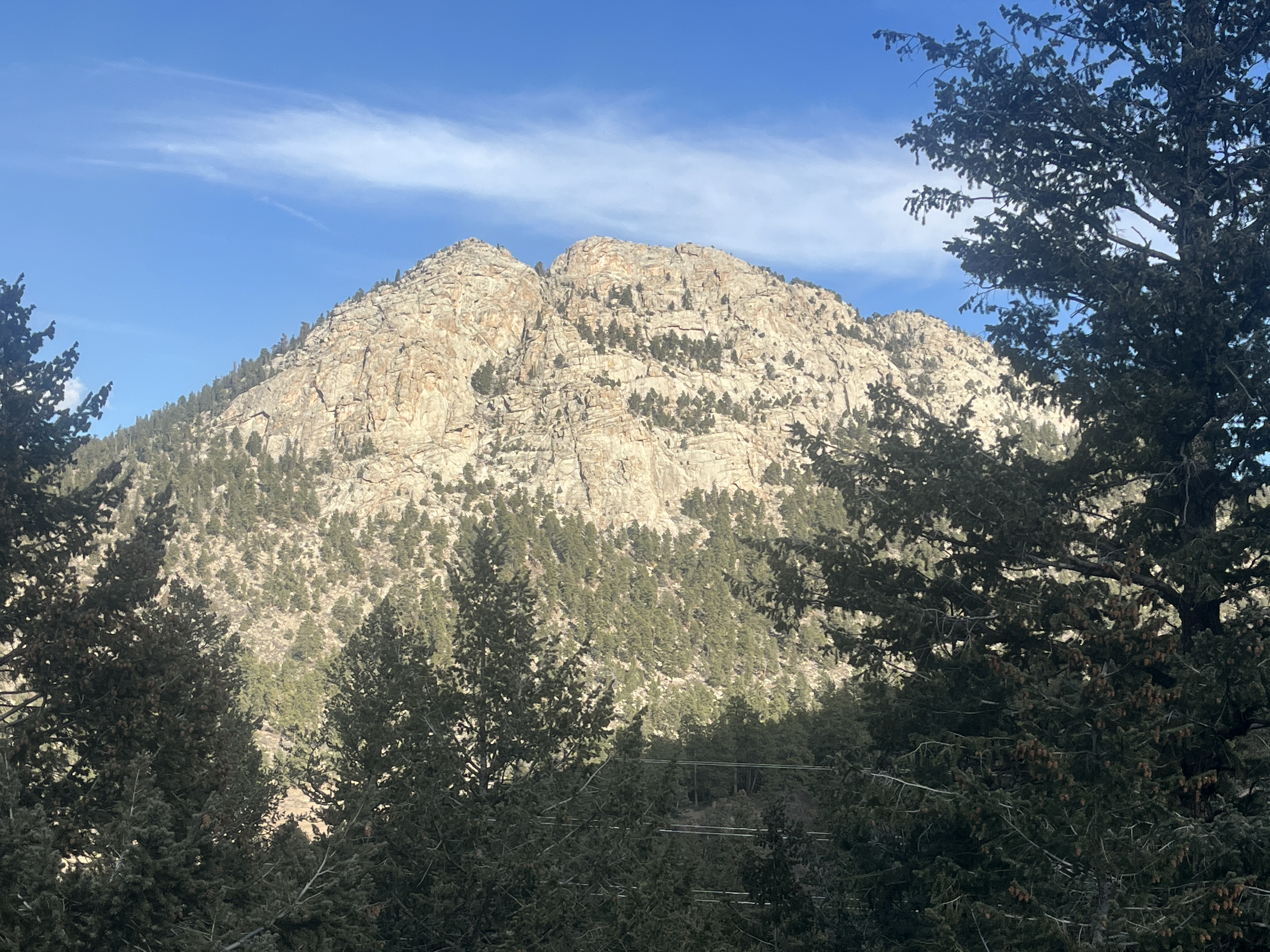
- Mount Olympus (Colorado) from US Highway 36

Highest point
- Elevation: 2,681.32 m (8,797.0 ft)
- Coordinates: 40°22′30″N 105°27′42″W

Geography
- Location within Colorado
- District(s): Larimer County, Colorado
- Parent range: Front Range, Rocky Mountains

Mount Olympus is a mountain located in the Front Range in Larimer County, Colorado, in Roosevelt National Forest. It provides a dramatic backdrop to Lake Estes and Olympus Dam. The peak is seen by hundreds of thousands of visitors to the popular tourist destination of Estes Park near Rocky Mountain National Park as they descend US Highway 36 into the Estes Valley.

A prominent rock slab with the name Estes Park is at a roadside pullout where countless tourists stop to photograph the peak and the Estes valley without even knowing the peak name. The rugged south rock face of the mountain presumably inspired the name based on the Greek mythology associated with the renowned Mount Olympus in Greece. The Colorado–Big Thompson Project includes a tunnel running directly through the mountain, the Olympus Tunnel, carrying water and generating power for the Front Range.

== History ==
The Arapahoe people named the peak (including 2 others): neeneb3i'eiitei'i, which translates as Faces to the wind.

An early reference to the peak is from Enos Mills in his book 1909 publication Wild Life on the Rockies. In the section Mountain Parks and Camp-Fires, he includes a photo from the summit of Mount Olympus looking west up the valley of Estes Park, with the Big Thompson River winding through the valley. At this time, the settlement of Estes Park likely was under 500 residents.

Mount Olympic Mine is located on the south side of the peak. It was mined for Mica. It is located on private land.

Mount Olympus from Estes Valley, circa 1870-1890

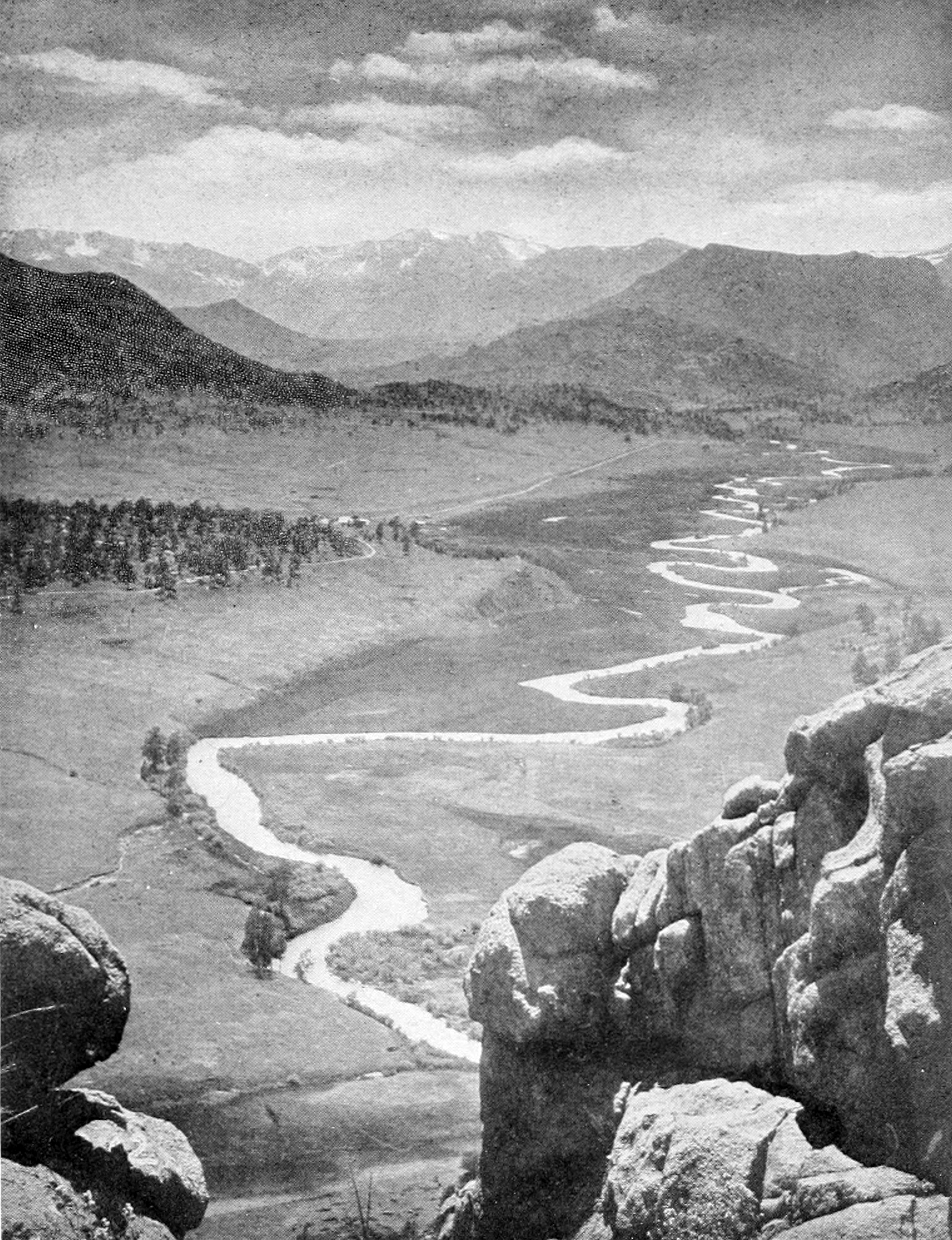
Enos Mills 1909 photo of Estes Valley from Mount Olympus.

== Role in establishment of the Rocky Mountain National Park ==
Enos Mills wrote essays for popular magazines and toured the country speaking of the beauty of the area. His essays were compiled into books. The stunning photo of 1909 was certainly an impact that contributed to the decision to establish Rocky Mountain National Park. Below the photo the author writes:

"During years of rambling I have visited and enjoyed all the celebrated parks of the Rockies, but one, which shall be nameless, is to me the loveliest of them all. The first view of it never fails to arouse the dullest traveler. From the entrance one looks down upon an irregular depression, several miles in length, a small undulating and beautiful mountain valley, framed in peaks with purple forested sides and bristling snowy grandeur. This valley is delightfully open, and has a picturesque sprinkling of pines over it, together with a few well-placed cliffs and crags. Its swift, clear, and winding brooks are fringed with birch and willow. A river crosses it with many a slow and splendid fold of silver."

== Hiking ==
There is an unmarked trail to the summit from the north side, on Highway 34, at a roadside pullout with the National Forest sign. The trail is shown on some mapping apps such as Gaia GPS. The hike to the summit is 1.2 miles and 1400' elevation gain. A short section of the trail and the summit ridge is on a boundary with private land. As of November 2025 there are no signs or fencing preventing access to the summit. The rock cliffs on the south side are on private land.

The summit ridge is large granite boulders, but they do not require technical climbing. One can find vantage points on the ridge that match the view of the famous 1909 photo which helped inspire creation of the national park.

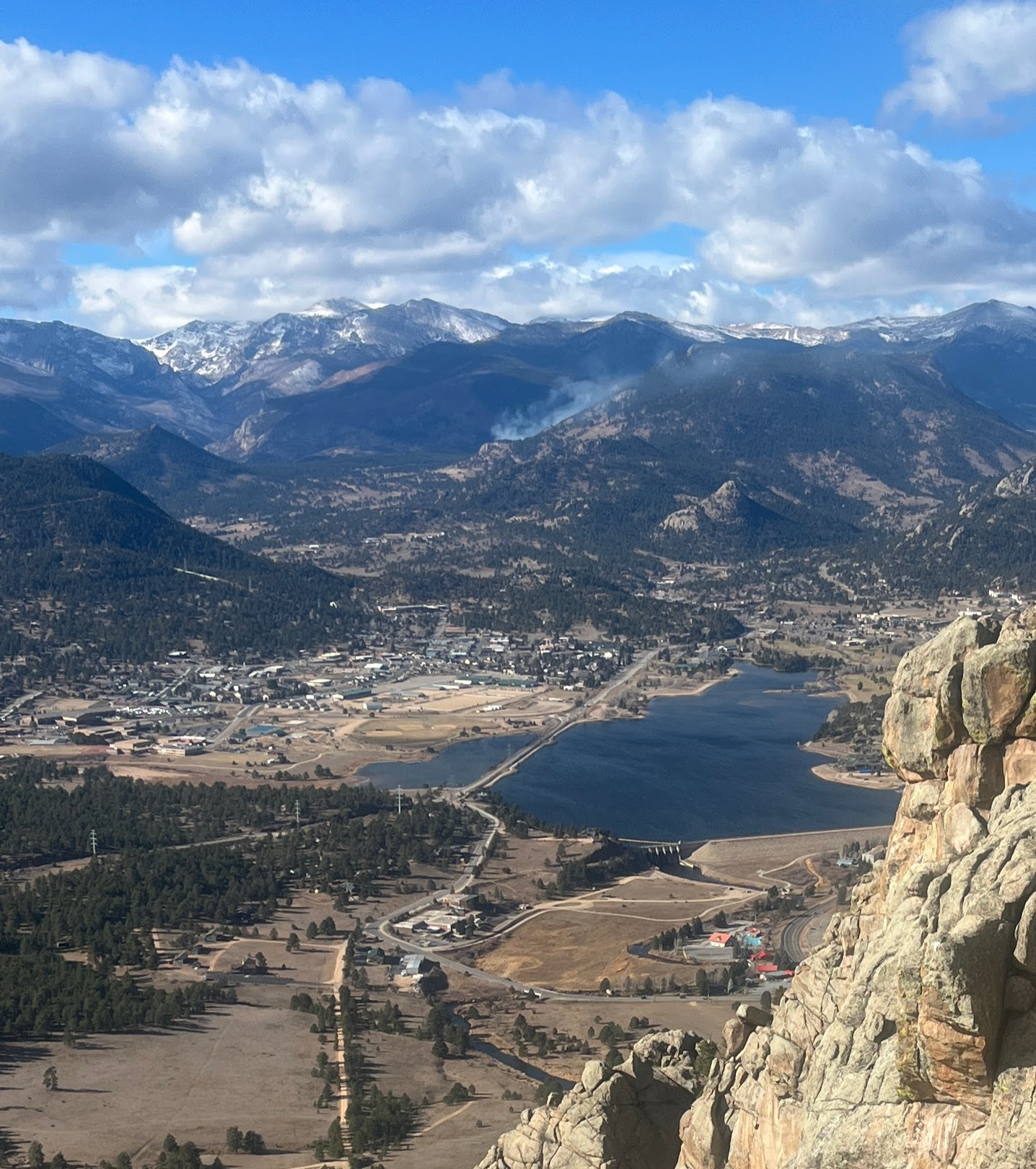
Estes Valley from Mount Olympus - 2025.

== Elevation confusion ==
Some maps show the elevation of the summit as 8,596 ft. These are clearly in error as the nearest topo line below the labeled summit is 8,760. Others show it at 8,808. However, the USGS represents it at 8,787 ft.
