= John Bishop Memorial Hospital =

Geography
- Location: Anantnag, Kashmir, India
- Coordinates: 33.73448931636861°N 75.16564417116437°E

Organisation
- Type: General

History
- Constructed: 1888
- Opened: 1902

Links
- Lists: Hospitals in India

The John Bishop Memorial Hospital was established in Srinagar, India, in 1888 as part of the medical missionary efforts led by Isabella Lucy Bishop and Dr. Fanny Jane Butler, the first woman medical missionary sent to the region. Initially operating as the Zenana Shifa Khana dispensary for women, it provided much-needed healthcare services at a time when modern medicine was scarce.

The construction of the hospital was made possible through a donation by Mrs. Isabella Bishop to honor her late husband, John Bishop.

== History ==
The John Bishop Memorial Hospital played a central role in the medical missionary efforts in Kashmir. Arthur Neve, his brother Dr. Ernest F. Neve, and their sister Miss Nora Neve were instrumental in advancing the hospital's mission. Dr. Arthur Neve, who served the region for 19 years, was awarded the Kaisar-i-Hind Gold Medal for his public service. Under their guidance, the hospital expanded its efforts to address significant health crises, including plague outbreaks, and supported initiatives by the Church of England Zenana Missionary Society (CEZMS), strengthening healthcare infrastructure and outreach in Kashmir.

=== Flood and reconstruction ===
In 1892, the John Bishop Memorial Hospital in Srinagar was destroyed by a devastating flood. Following this, the hospital was reconstructed in Anantnag at the request of Lord Roberts, the Commander-in-Chief of the British Army. By June 1902, the hospital was reopened under the leadership of Minnie Gomery, an M.D. candidate, and nursing sister Kate Nownham. This reconstruction marked a significant milestone in restoring healthcare services to the region, ensuring continued medical care for the local population.
