= Fanny Jane Butler =

British missionary (1850–1889)

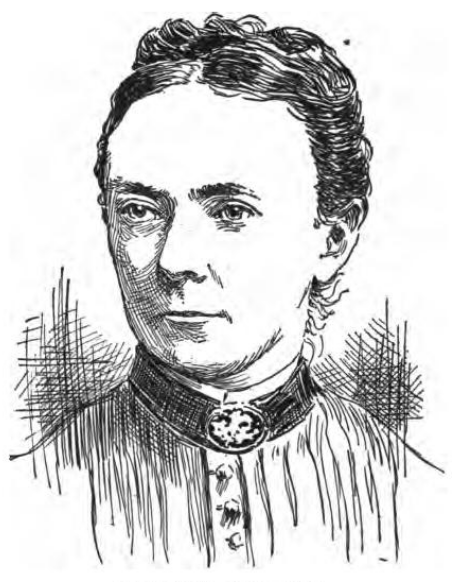
- Born: 5 October 1850; Chelsea, London, England
- Died: 26 October 1889 (aged 39); Srinagar, India
- Education: London School of Medicine for Women
- Medical career
- Profession: Physician, medical missionary

Fanny Jane Butler (5 October 1850 – 26 October 1889) was a medical missionary from England who was among the first female doctors to travel to India and the first fully trained doctor from England to do so. Prior to her work in Kashmir and other parts of India, Butler was a part of the first class of the London School of Medicine for Women, becoming a member of the forefront of female doctors. Butler spent seven years in India until her death in 1889 and opened medical dispensaries in Srinagar and Bhagalpur, where no medical facilities had previously existed. Butler also initiated the building of the first hospital in Srinagar in 1888 called the John Bishop Memorial Hospital and provided necessary medical care for Indian women, for whom little care had been available.

== Early life ==
Butler was born on 5 October 1850, in Chelsea, London, the eighth of ten children born to Thomas Butler and Jane Isabella (née North) Butler. Only her brothers received a formal education, and they informally taught her before she attended the West London College in 1865 at the age of 15. After one year of school, Butler returned home to help with housework and regularly went to Saint Simon Zelotes Church in Chelsea. Butler was interested in religion and had become a Sunday school teacher earlier when she was 14 years old. In 1872, Butler went to live in Birmingham to nurse her elder sister. In Birmingham, Butler encountered an article by prominent Scottish medical missionary William Elmslie, which solicited female missionaries to aid the women in India. This article sparked Butler's interest in medical missionary work, and two years later in 1874 she was accepted to the India Female Normal School and Instruction Society, a non-denominational missionary group that eventually became the Church of England Zenana Missionary Society in 1880. Later that year, Butler was admitted to the first class of the London School of Medicine for Women, which was the first medical school for women in England. Butler obtained a formal medical education there and graduated with high marks, receiving the prize of pathology in 1879 and the prize of anatomy in 1880.

== Call to India ==
At the time, the opportunities available in England for female physicians were limited. However, Butler's medical training could be used elsewhere. In parts of India, female doctors were needed because the purdah women who lived there were not comfortable receiving care from male doctors. In response to this need, Butler was sent to India by the Church of Zenana Missionary Society, an Anglican group specifically devoted to Christianizing the women of India through various methods including medical missionary work.

== Missionary work ==
Butler arrived in India in 1880, first staying in Jabalpur then traveling to Bhagalpur, where she remained for four and a half years. In Bhagalpur, she ran two medical dispensaries and saw several thousand patients, dressing wounds, performing surgery, and administering medication. After going back to England for an eleven-month furlough, Butler returned to India in August 1888 and was appointed to work in Kashmir. She moved to Srinagar, a city in Kashmir, but resided four miles outside of the city because foreigners were not allowed to live there, traveling into the city daily by pony or boat. Butler continued to see patients in Srinagar, using a translator to communicate, and also delivered religious speeches to those she treated and with whom she worked. In the first 7 months, Butler and her staff saw 8832 outpatients and did 500 operations. She eventually was able to obtain enough land from the government to build a dispensary, missionary house, and hospital for women. At that time, Butler met an English woman named Isabella Bird who was visiting Kashmir. Bird was interested in medical missionary work and gave Butler the money to build the medical facilities. Thus Butler established the John Bishop Memorial Hospital, which was built in memory of Isabella Bird's late husband (the hospital was later rebuilt in Anantnag in 1902 after a flood destroyed the Srinagar location).

== Death and legacy ==
While working in Kashmir, Butler fell ill and died on 26 October 1889, aged 39, from dysentery. She was buried in a cemetery in Srinagar. Butler left a lasting legacy in India for both local and international women. She was a pioneer in the medical field for female doctors, inspiring others to join the movement. Butler provided Indian women medical care that was not previously available, and although she did not live to see its completion, Butler initiated the creation of the John Bishop Memorial Hospital, the first hospital in Srinagar, which still functions today in its new location in Anantnag. Butler was remembered for her method of a "double cure," treating Indian women both medically and spiritually. After she died, the London School of Medicine for Women established a scholarship in her honor.
