= Lumpy Ridge =

Coordinates: 40°24′39″N 105°31′56″W

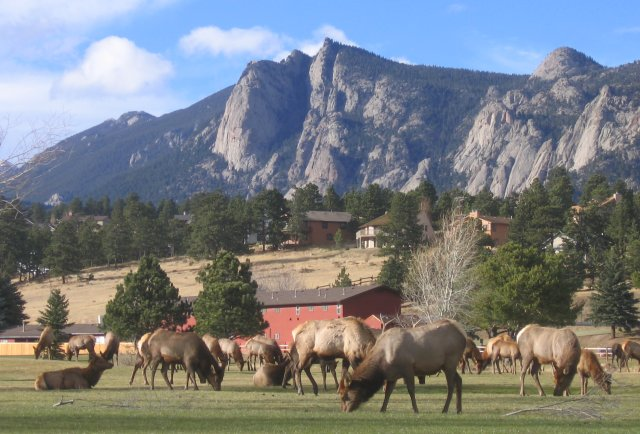
Lumpy Ridge overlooking Estes Park

Lumpy Ridge is a prominent series of rocky cliffs, slabs, and buttresses adjacent to and north of the town of Estes Park, Colorado, and lies inside of Rocky Mountain National Park and is known for rock climbing.

The highest point on the ridge are the Needles, at 10,068 feet (3,068.726 m.) on the western edge. Another recognizable feature are the Twin Owls, which, when viewed from Estes Park, look like owls. The slab of stone they rest on is known as the Roosting Ramp.
