= Prospect Mountain (Larimer County, Colorado) =

Mountain in Colorado, United States

- Location within Colorado

Highest point
- Elevation: 8,898 ft (2,712 m)
- Coordinates: 40°21′36.86″N 105°31′13.4″W

Geography
- Location: Larimer County, Colorado

Prospect Mountain is a 8,898 feet (2,712 m) summit south of Estes Park in Larimer County, Colorado.
