= Lily Lake (Colorado) =

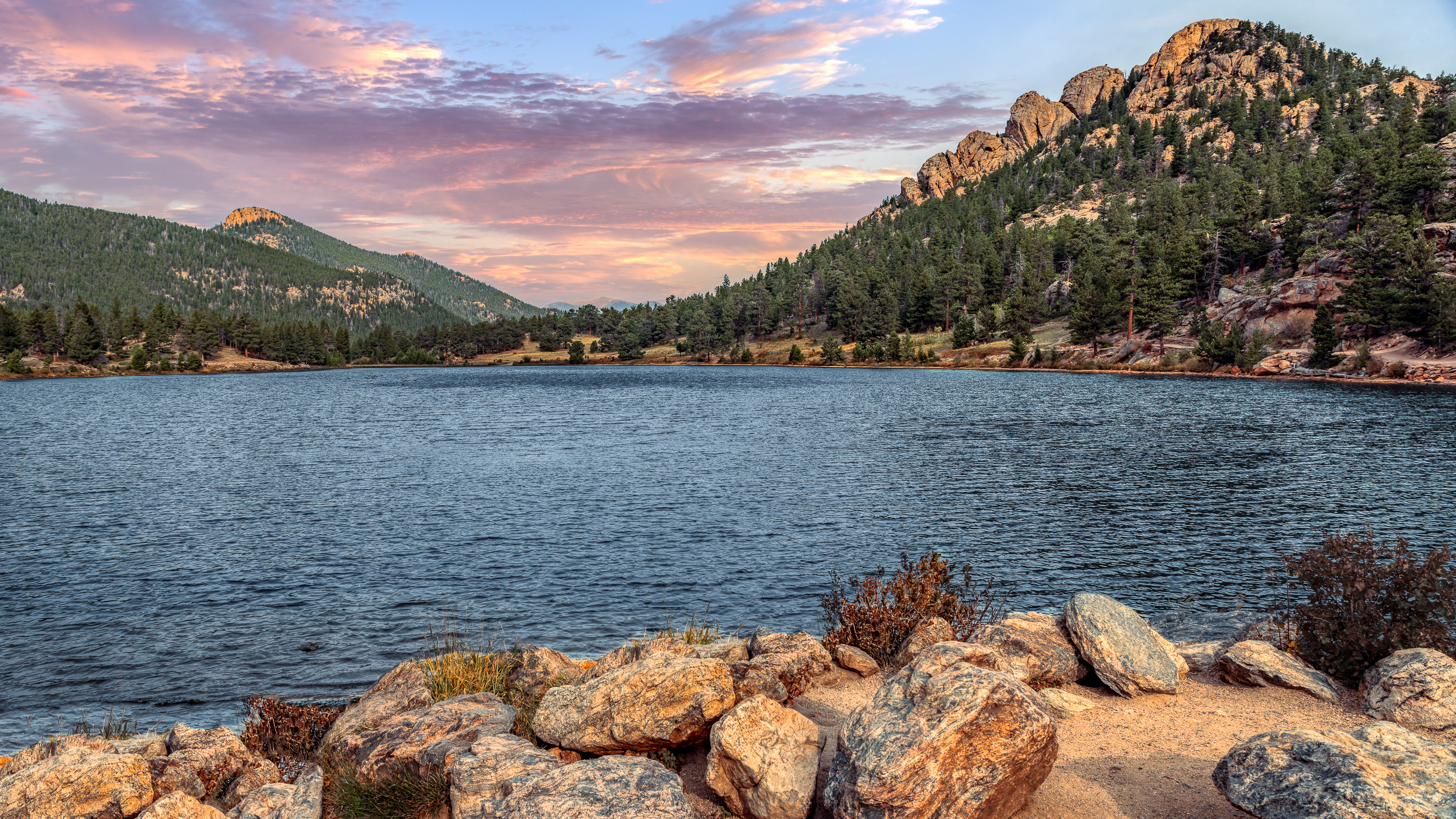
- Lily Lake
- Interactive map of Lily Lake
- Location: Larimer County, Colorado, U.S.
- Group: Rocky Mountain National Park
- Coordinates: 40.307°N 105.540°W
- Type: Alpine lake / Wetland
- Managing agency: National Park Service
- Surface elevation: 8,880 ft (2,710 m)
- Settlements: Estes Park, Colorado

Lily Lake is an alpine lake located at an elevation of 8,880 feet (2,706 m) in the southeastern section of Rocky Mountain National Park, within Larimer County, Colorado. Situating approximately 6 miles (9.7 km) south of the town of Estes Park along Colorado State Highway 7, the lake sits on a natural drainage divide between Aspen Brook and the headwaters of Fish Creek. The lake features an accessible 0.8-mile (1.3 km) crushed-gravel loop trail equipped with a viewing dock designed to accommodate wheelchair users.
