= Lake Estes =

Man-made reservoir in Colorado, United States

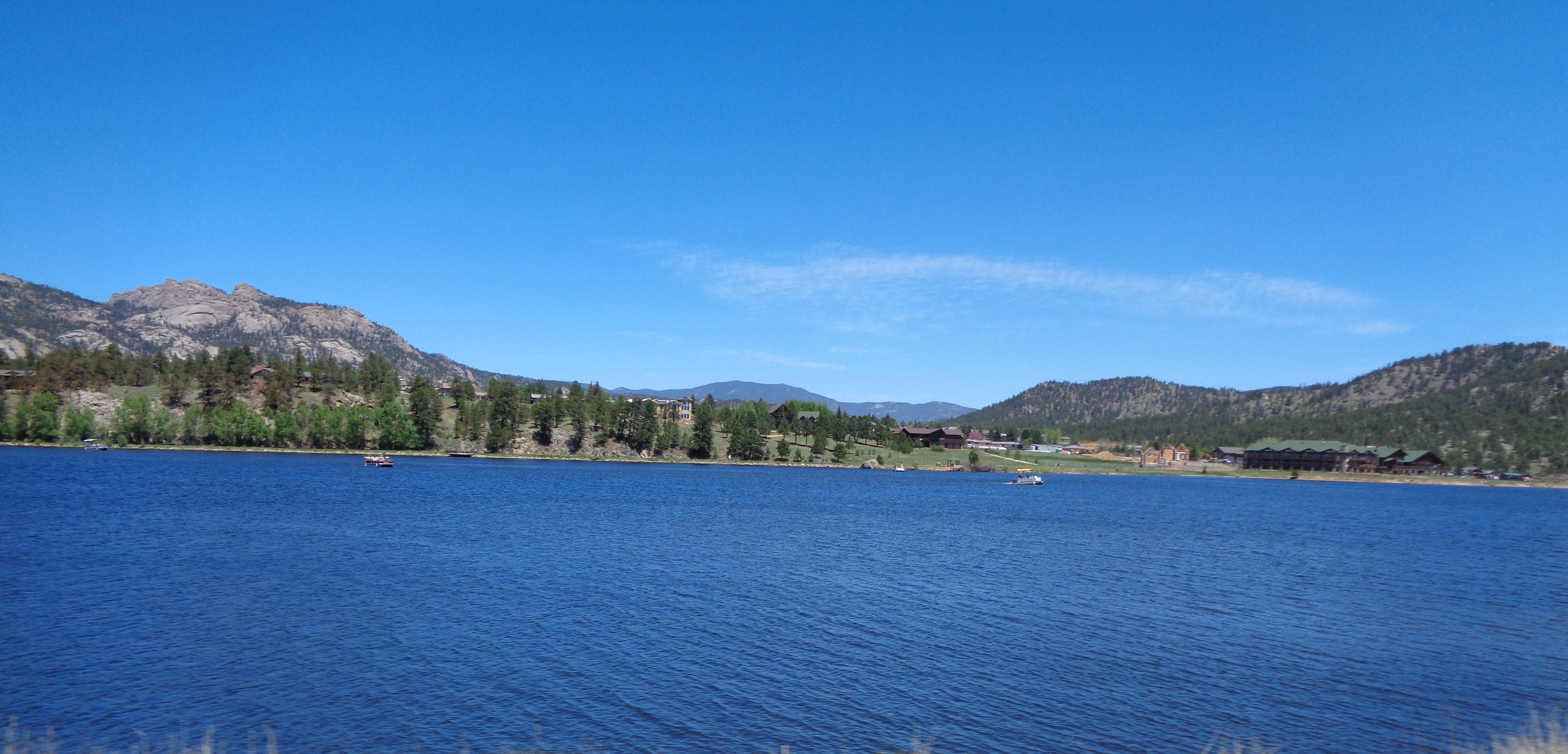
- Lake Estes, Colorado.

- Location within Colorado
- Location: Larimer County, Colorado
- Coordinates: 40°22′36″N 105°29′18″W
- Type: reservoir
- Surface area: 185 acres (75 ha)
- Shore length^{1}: 4 miles (6.4 km)
- Surface elevation: 7,522 ft (2,293 m)
- ^{1} Shore length is not a well-defined measure.

Lake Estes is a reservoir in Estes Park, Colorado created by Olympus Dam. The lake has a shoreline of about 4 miles (6.4 km) and a surface area of 185 acres (75 ha). The reservoir lies on the Big Thompson River and is a component of the Colorado-Big Thompson Project. Lake Estes sits at 7,522 feet (2,293 m) in elevation with approximately 4 miles of shoreline within Larimer County.
