= A Lady's Life in the Rocky Mountains =

Novel by Isabella Bird

- Book cover for A Lady's Life in the Rocky Mountains (1900 edition)
- Author: Isabella Bird
- Original title: A Lady's Life in the Rocky Mountains
- Language: English
- Genre: Travel novel
- Publisher: John Murray
- Publication date: 1879
- Publication place: United States of America
- Media type: Print

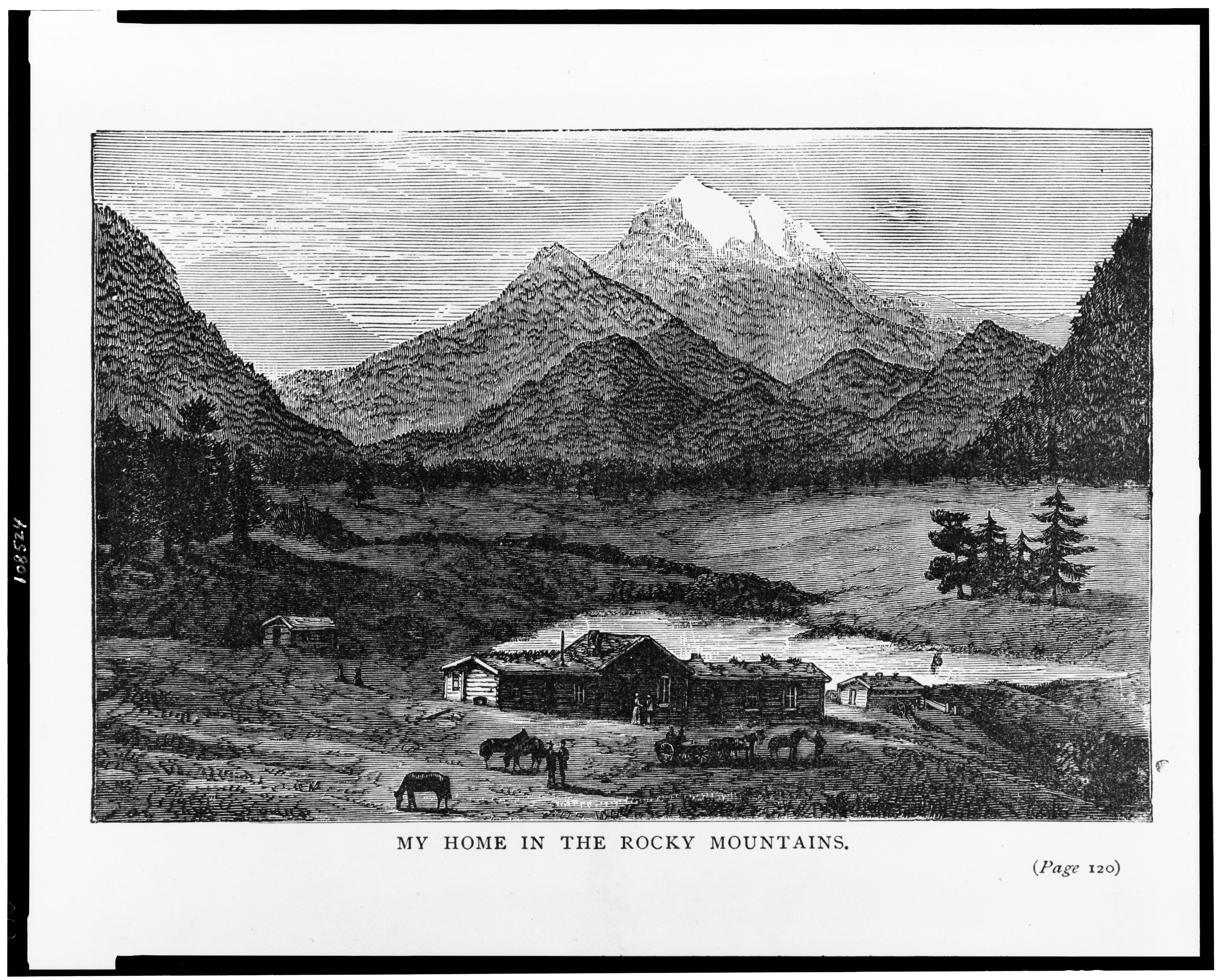
The book's illustration of Estes Park

A Lady's Life in the Rocky Mountains is a travel book by British explorer Isabella Bird, describing her 1873 trip to the Rocky Mountains of Colorado, then on the frontier of the United States. The book is a compilation of letters that Bird wrote to her sister, Henrietta, and was published in October 1879 by John Murray.

== Summary ==
In 1872, Isabella Bird left Britain, going first to Australia, then to Hawaii, then known as the Sandwich Islands. After some time there, she sailed for the United States, docking at San Francisco. She passed the area of Lake Tahoe, to Cheyenne, Wyoming, Estes Park, Colorado, and elsewhere in and near the Rocky Mountains of the Colorado Territory.

Her guide was Rocky Mountain Jim, described as a desperado, but with whom she got along quite well. She was the first white woman to stand atop Longs Peak, Colorado, pointing out that Jim "dragged me up, like a bale of goods, by sheer force of muscle." He treated her well, and she acknowledged that "He is a man whom any woman might love but no sane woman would marry." He was shot to death, seven months later.

After many other adventures, Isabella Bird ultimately took a train east.

== Reception ==
A Lady's Life in the Rocky Mountains was an "instant bestseller". It contributed to Bird being distinguished by being the first woman to become a member of the Royal Geographical Society, in 1892.
