= Olympus Dam =

Dam in Colorado, US

Coordinates: 40°22′36″N 105°29′17″W

Olympus Dam is a dam located on the Big Thompson River, in the town of Estes Park, Colorado. The reservoir behind the dam, Lake Estes, is the main source of drinking water for Estes Park. The dam was constructed between 1947 and 1949. The dam is 70 feet high, has a crest width of 10 feet, a base width of 49.5 feet, and a crest length of 320 feet. It is part of the Colorado-Big Thompson Project.

== Construction ==
On 16 June 1947, bids began to be placed for the dam-building contract. It was won by the Gordon, Bressi and Bevanda construction firm.
