= Isabella Bird =

English explorer and writer (1831–1904)

Isabella Bird FRSGS FRGS
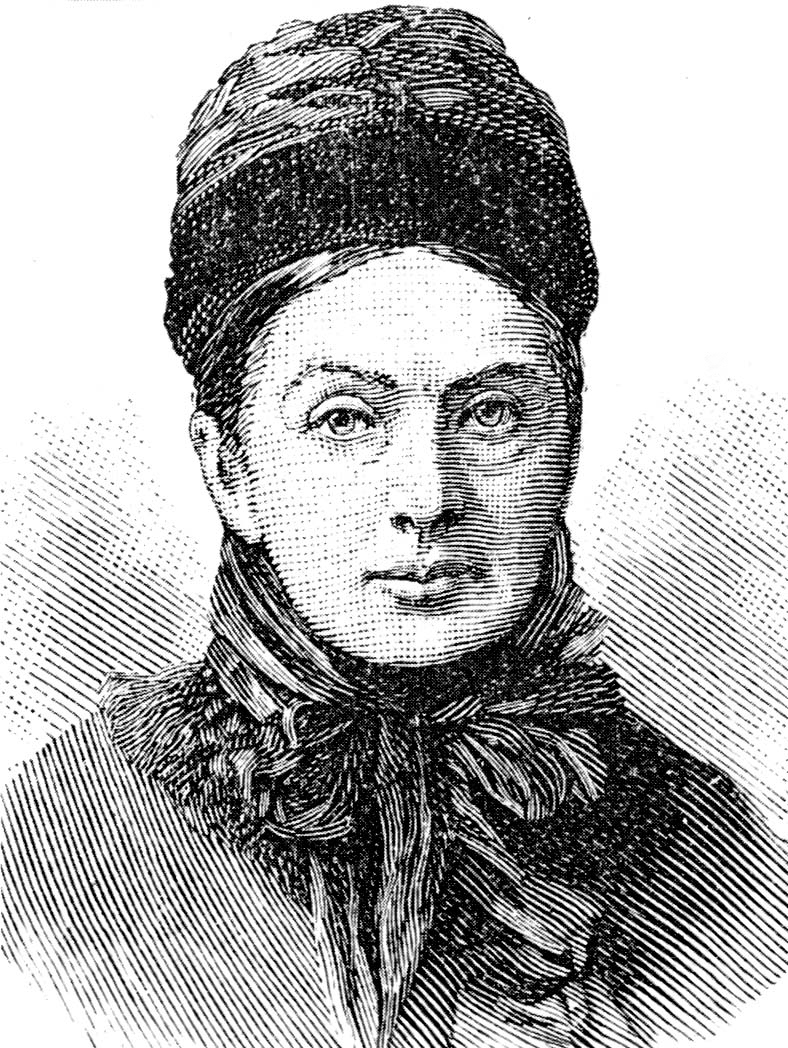
- Born: Isabella Lucy Bird; 15 October 1831; Boroughbridge, Yorkshire
- Died: 7 October 1904 (aged 72); Edinburgh, Scotland
- Resting place: Dean Cemetery, Edinburgh
- Occupations: Writer, photographer and naturalist
- Spouse: John Bishop (m. 1881)

Isabella Lucy Bishop FRGS (née Bird; 15 October 1831 – 7 October 1904) was an English explorer, writer, photographer and naturalist. Alongside fellow Englishwoman Fanny Jane Butler, she founded the John Bishop Memorial Hospital in Srinagar in modern-day Kashmir. She was the first woman to be elected as a fellow of the Royal Geographical Society.

== Early life ==
Bird was born on 15 October 1831 at Boroughbridge Hall in Yorkshire. She was the daughter of Dora Lawson and the Rev. Edward Bird, a clergyman. She had a younger sister, Henrietta Amelia Bird.

Bird spent much of her childhood moving between parishes as her father took up new clerical posts. In 1832, the family relocated to Maidenhead and two years later to Tattenhall in Cheshire, where her sister Henrietta was born. In 1842, they moved again to St Thomas's in Birmingham after her father's opposition to Sunday labour led to a decline in his congregation. A further move followed in 1848, when the family lived for a time in Eastbourne before settling in Wyton.

From an early age, Bird was known for her independence and outspokenness. At age six, she reportedly confronted the local MP, Sir Malpas de Grey Tatton Egerton, during an election campaign, asking whether he had complimented her sister in order to win her father's vote.

=== Education ===
Her only education came from her parents: her father was a keen botanist who instructed Bird in flora, and her mother taught her daughters an eclectic mix of subjects. Bird became an avid reader. However, her "bright intelligence, [and] an extreme curiosity as to the world outside, made it impossible for her brain and her nature generally to be narrowed and stiffened by the strictly evangelical atmosphere of her childhood". Isabella's first publication at age 16 was a pamphlet addressing free trade versus protectionism. She continued writing articles for various periodicals.

=== Health concerns ===
From early childhood, Bird experienced poor health, including a spinal condition, chronic headaches, and insomnia. Medical advice recommended an outdoor lifestyle, and she learned to ride and to row. In 1850 a fibrous tumour was removed from near her spine. Although the operation brought some relief, she continued to experience recurring illness, including fatigue and insomnia. In an effort to improve her condition, her family spent six successive summers in Scotland.

Doctors advised a sea voyage, a recommendation that proved decisive. In 1854 Bird travelled to the United States with relatives, marking the beginning of her life of travel. Her father "gave her [£]100 and leave to stay away as long as it lasted". The letters she wrote during this journey formed the basis of her first book, An Englishwoman in America (1856), published by John Murray. Murray became both her long-term publisher and a close personal friend.

== Early international journeys (1872–1873) ==
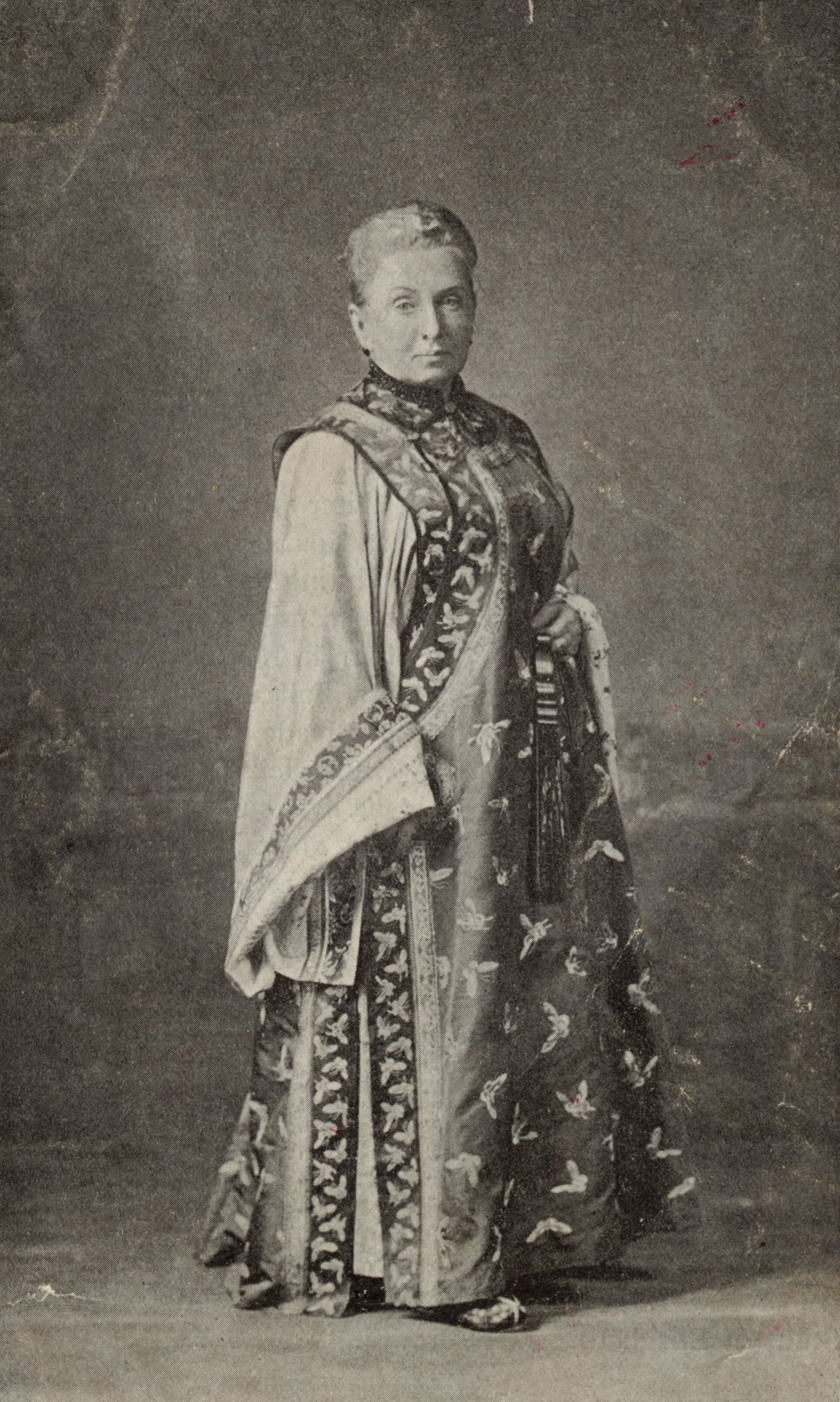
Isabella Bird wearing Manchurian clothing from a journey through China.

Bird left Britain again in 1872, going initially to Australia, which she disliked, and then to Hawaii (known in Europe as the Sandwich Islands), her love for which prompted her second book (published in 1875). While there, she climbed Mauna Kea and Mauna Loa.

She then moved on to Colorado, where she had heard the air was excellent for the infirmed. Dressed practically and riding not sidesaddle but frontwards like a man (though she threatened to sue the Times for saying she dressed like one), she covered over 800 miles in the Rocky Mountains in 1873. Her letters to her sister, first printed in the magazine The Leisure Hour, comprised Bird's fourth and perhaps most famous book, A Lady's Life in the Rocky Mountains.

Bird's time in the Rockies was enlivened especially by her acquaintance with Jim Nugent, "Rocky Mountain Jim", an outlaw with one eye and an affinity for violence and poetry. "A man any woman might love but no sane woman would marry", Bird declares in a section excised from her letters before their publication. Nugent also seemed captivated by the independent-minded Bird, but she ultimately left the Rockies and her "dear desperado". Nugent was shot dead less than a year later.

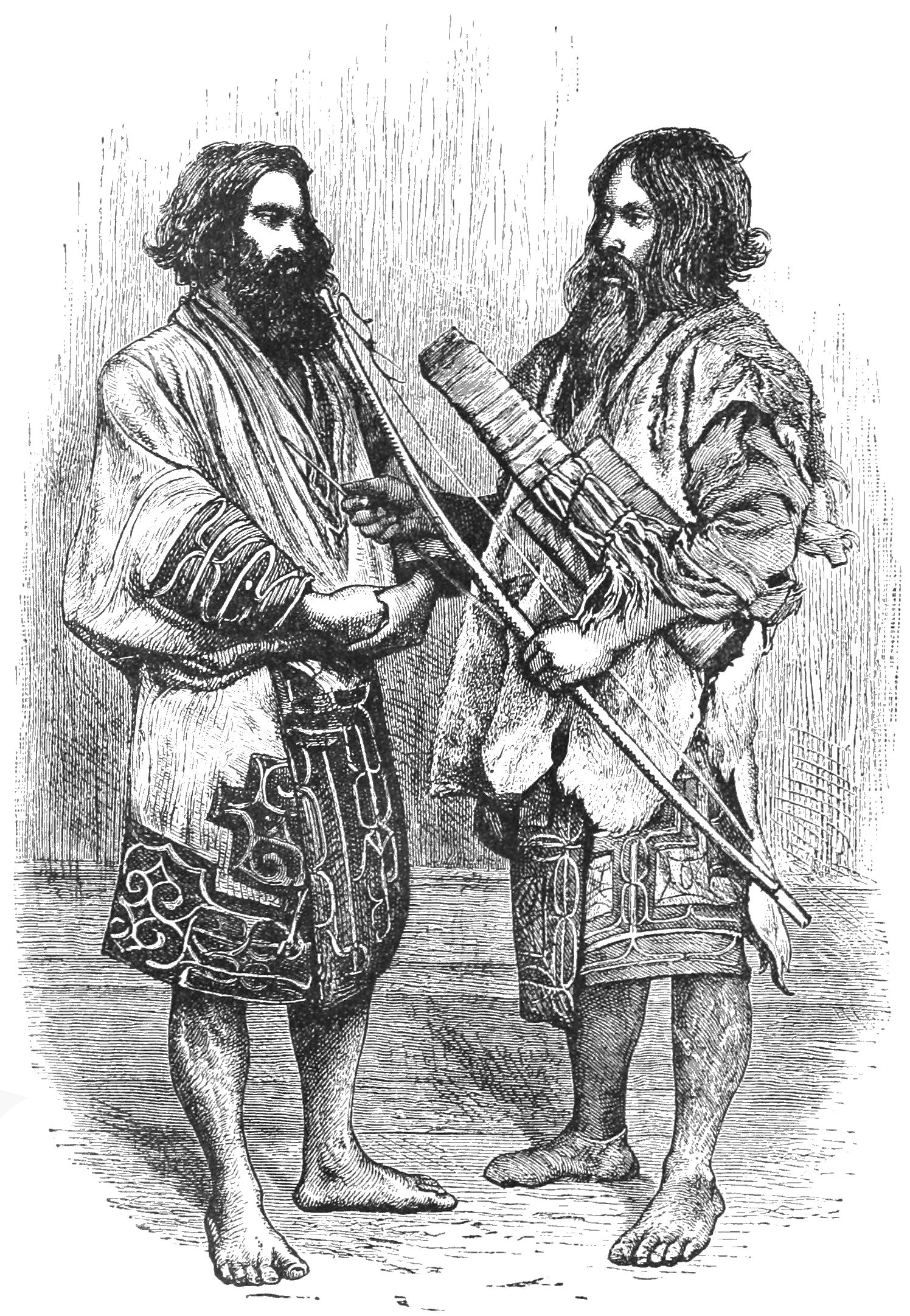
Illustration of two Ainu men, originally from her 1880 book Unbeaten Tracks in Japan

== Asian journeys and personal turning point (1878–1886) ==
Bird became interested in Japan through John Francis Campbell's "My Circular Notes, 1876", and asked the advice of Colin Alexander McVean, former chief surveyor of Japan's Survey Office. Her Asia travels began in February 1878 and included Japan, China, Korea, Vietnam, Singapore and Malaya. Bird married John Bishop in February 1881, and later that year she was awarded the Royal Order of Kapiolani by King Kalākaua of Hawaii. Following Bishop's death in 1886, she inherited a large amount of disposable income.

Her health took a severe turn for the worse, but other than a spell of scarlet fever in 1888 she recovered. Feeling that her earlier travels had been hopelessly dilettante, Bird studied medicine and resolved to travel as a missionary. Despite being nearly 60 years of age, she set off for India.

== Missionary travels, recognition, and final journeys of Bird (1889–1904) ==
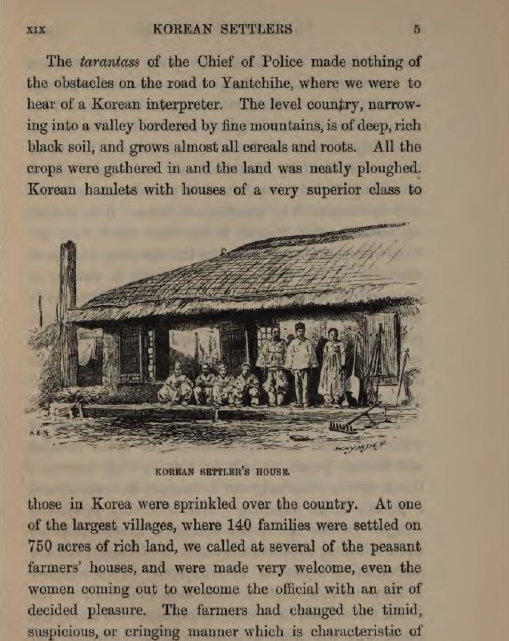
Korea and Her Neighbours (1898)

Arriving on the Indian subcontinent in February 1889, Bird visited missions, visited Ladakh on the borders of Tibet, and then travelled in Iran, Kurdistan, and Turkey.

In India, the maharajah of Kashmir gave her land on which to build a hospital with 60 beds and a dispensary for women; there she worked with Fanny Jane Butler to found the John Bishop Memorial Hospital in memory of her deceased husband who had left funds for this purpose in his will.

She joined a group of British soldiers travelling between Baghdad and Tehran. She remained with the unit's commanding officer during his survey work in the region, armed with her revolver and a medicine chest supplied by Henry Wellcome's company in London.

In 1891, she travelled through Baluchistan to Iran and Armenia, exploring the source of the Karun River, and later that year she gave a speech in a committee room of the House of Commons on the persecution of Christians in Kurdistan, on which she had made representations to the grand vizier of the Turkish Empire. Like most other European explorers of her generation, Bird employed large labour forces that did much of the work of transporting her. For instance, in China she was carried 1,200 miles across the country by a changing group of Chinese men.

Featured in journals and magazines for decades, Bird had become a household name. In 1890 she became the first woman to be awarded Honorary Fellowship of the Royal Scottish Geographical Society. In 1892 she became the first woman allowed to join the Royal Geographical Society. She was elected to membership of the Royal Photographic Society in 1897. Her final great journey took place in 1897, when she travelled up the Yangtze and Han rivers. She then went to Morocco, where she travelled among the Berbers and had to use a ladder to mount her black stallion, a gift from the sultan.

== Death ==
A few months after returning from a trip to Morocco, Bird fell ill and died at her home on 16 Melville Street, Edinburgh on 7 October 1904. She was buried with her family in Dean Cemetery. The grave lies in the small curved southern section, near the small path which divides it in two. She was planning another trip to China at the time of her death.

== Awards, honours and recognition ==
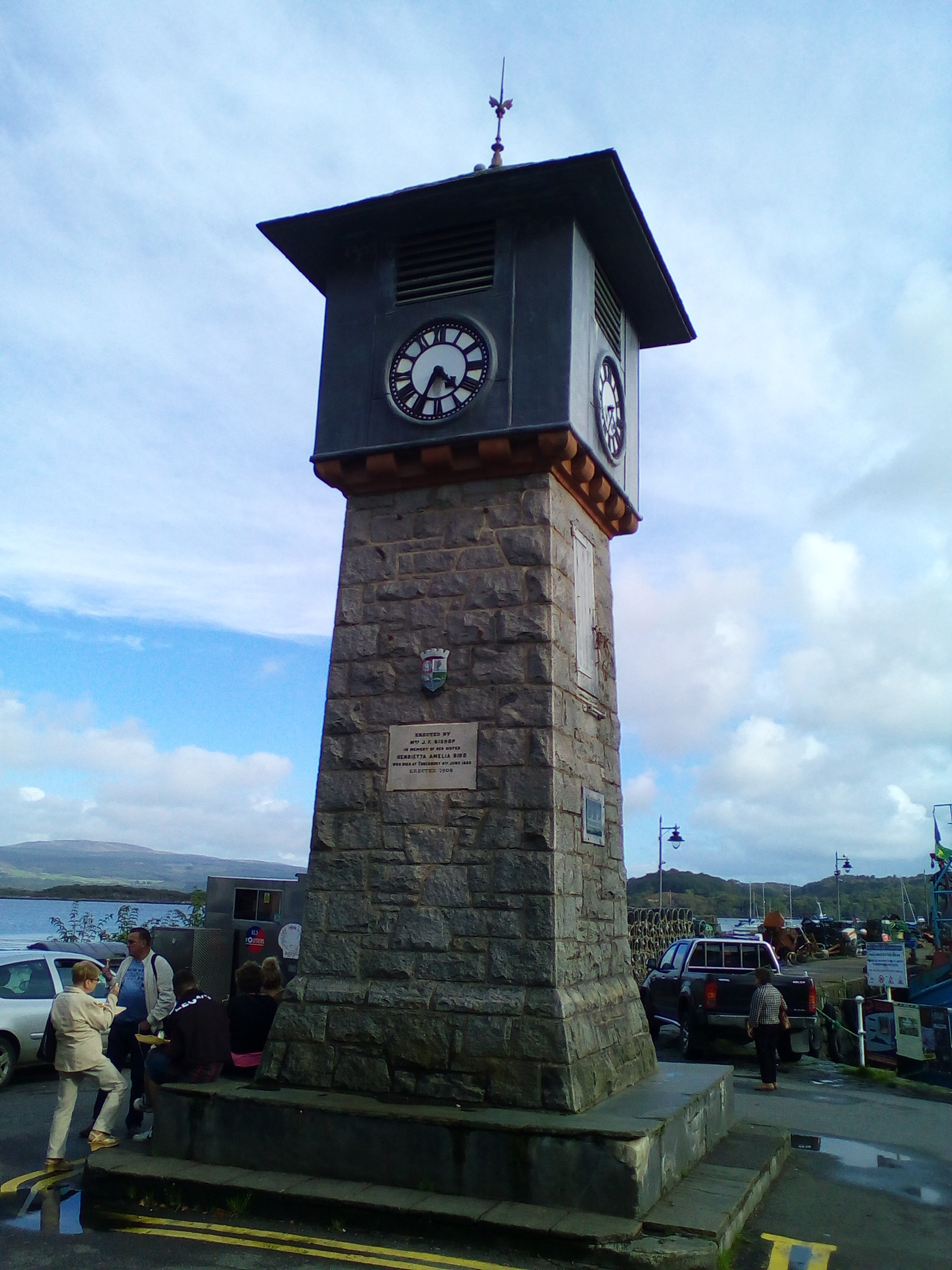
Clock tower in Tobermory built with funds donated by Isabella Lucy Bird

Institutional and professional recognition

- Awarded the Royal Order of Kapiolani by King Kalākaua of Hawaii, 1881
- Became the first woman to receive Honorary Fellowship of the Royal Scottish Geographical Society, 1890
- Became the first woman admitted as a fellow of the Royal Geographical Society, 1892
- Elected to the Royal Photographic Society, 12 January 1897
- Inducted into the Colorado Women's Hall of Fame, 1985

Commemoration and historical memory

- The Life of Isabella Bird, Mrs Bishop, the first biography by Anne M. Stoddart, published 1907
- Funded a clock tower at Tobermory, Isle of Mull, in memory of her sister Henrietta; designed by Edward Whymper
- Commemorated in a heritage event in Kaneyama, Japan, retracing her recorded route along the Ushu Kaido, July 2023

Cultural and creative representations

- Appears as a character in Caryl Churchill's play Top Girls, 1982
- Central figure in the manga Isabella Bird in Wonderland (Fushigi no Kuni no Bird), with a bilingual edition beginning 2018
- Featured in the BBC Two programme Trailblazers: A Rocky Mountain Road Trip, December 2022
- Subject of Outlandish, a stage production in Hawaii dramatizing her encounters in Hilo, including with King Lunalilo, 2025
- Included in Bedrock: Writers on the Wonders of Geology, 2006

== Works ==
Bird's published works reflect her extensive travels across North America, the Pacific, and Asia, as well as her ongoing contributions to periodical literature.

=== Britain and Europe (regional observation and travel writing) ===
- "A Lady's Winter Holiday in Ireland". Murray's Magazine. March 1888.
- Notes on Old Edinburgh. 1869.
- "Pen and Pencil Sketches Among the Outer Hebrides". The Leisure Hour. 1866.

=== East Asia (major late-career works) ===
- Chinese Pictures: Notes on Photographs Made in China. New York: C. L. Bowman. 1900.
- Korea and Her Neighbours. 1898.
- The Yangtze Valley and Beyond. J. Murray. 1899.
- Unbeaten Tracks in Japan: Travels of a Lady in the Interior of Japan. 1879.

=== Middle East and Central Asia (expeditions and political observation) ===
- Among the Tibetans. Revell. 1894.
- Journeys in Persia and Kurdistan. 1891.
- "Notes on Morocco". Monthly Review. 1901.
- "A Pilgrimage to Mount Sinai". The Leisure Hour. January 1886.
- "The Shadow of the Kurd". Contemporary Review. May 1891.

=== North America and the Atlantic world (early travels and social commentary) ===
- The Aspects of Religion in the United States of America. 1859.
- The Englishwoman in America. John Murray. 1856.
- "The Two Atlantics". The Leisure Hour. September 1876.

=== Pacific and Hawaii (missionary observation and colonial encounters) ===
- "Australia Felix: Impressions of Victoria and Melbourne". The Leisure Hour. March 1877.
- "Christianity in the Hawaiian Islands". The Sunday Magazine. August 1875.
- "Heathenism in the Hawaiian Islands". The Sunday Magazine. July 1875.
- Six Months in the Sandwich Islands, amongst the Palm Groves, Coral Reefs and Volcanoes. 1874.
- The Hawaiian Archipelago. 1875.

=== Southeast Asia (regional travel accounts) ===
- "Sketches in the Malay Peninsula". The Leisure Hour. January 1883.
- The Golden Chersonese and the Way Thither. New York: G. P. Putnam's Sons. 1883.

=== General and reflective works (synthesis, commentary, and religious writing) ===
- A Lady's Life in the Rocky Mountains. London: John Murray, 1879 (many later editions)
- --do.-- London: Virago Press, 1982 (facsimile of 1st ed.)
- "Keble and His Hymns". The Sunday Magazine. December 1872.
- "Notes on Travel". The Leisure Hour. December 1879.
- "The Proverbs of the New Testament". The Sunday Magazine. October 1871.

== Bibliography ==
- Barr, Pat (1970). A Curious Life for a Lady: The Story of Isabella Bird, a Remarkable Victorian Traveller. Secker & Warburg. ISBN 9780708982402.
- Bird, Isabella Lucy. The Golden Chersonese and the Way Thither. New York: G. P. Putnam's Sons, 1883.
- Birkett, Dea (1989). Spinsters Abroad: Victorian Lady Explorers, Oxford: Basil Blackwell. ISBN 978-0-631-15604-8
- Gartlan, Luke Gartlan (15 April 2011). "A Complete Craze: Isabella Bird Bishop in East Asia". PhotoResearcher. Vienna: ESHPh: 13–26. ISSN 0958-2606.
- Glauber, Carole (Summer 2002). "Isabella Bird Bishop: Korea, the Yangtze Valley, and Beyond". Photo Review.
- Havely, Cicely Palser, ed. (1984). This Grand Beyond: The Travels of Isabella Bird Bishop, London: Century Publishing. ISBN 978-0-712-60392-8
- Middleton, Dorothy. Victorian Lady Travellers. London: Routledge and Kegan Paul, 1965.
