= James Nugent (Estes Park) =

James Nugent, known as "Rocky Mountain Jim" (died 1874) was a mountain man in the early history of Estes Park, in the Rocky Mountain National Park, Colorado. A guide for visitors, his character is described in the writings of English explorer and author Isabella Bird.

== Life ==
James Nugent came to Estes Park about 1868; it is not known where he came from. He built a cabin in Muggins Gulch, an entrance to Estes Park, and was one of the first guides in the area. He lost his eye and sustained other injuries when attacked by a grizzly bear in July 1869.

=== Meeting with Isabella Bird ===
English explorer Isabella Bird was exploring Colorado in 1873; her uncle George Kingsley recommended Estes Park. Much of what is known about Nugent comes from her writings, in A Lady's Life in the Rocky Mountains. She describes Nugent as "…a broad, thickset man, about the middle height, with an old cap on his head, and wearing a grey hunting-suit much the worse for wear… a revolver, sticking out of the breast-pocket of his coat… Tawny hair, in thin uncared-for curls, fell from under his hunter’s cap and over his collar. One eye was entirely gone, and the loss made one side of the face repulsive, while the other might have been modeled in marble… Of his genius and chivalry to women there does not appear to be any doubt; but he is a desperate character, and subject to 'ugly fits', when people think it best to avoid him."

With Nugent as guide, and two others, she climbed Longs Peak; Bird writes "Had I known that the ascent was a real mountaineering feat I should not have felt the slightest ambition to perform it." During the expedition, Nugent confided to her; she wrote in a letter that he "told stories of his early youth, and of a great sorrow which had led him to embark on a lawless and desperate life." She continued to correspond with him after she left Estes Park.

=== Death ===
Griffith Evans, who ran the old Estes ranch in the valley, was a rival of Nugent. He was a guide, like him. Nugent was opposed to Lord Dunraven's plan to make Estes Park a hunting preserve, but Evans was in favor of it. It was also thought that Nugent was interested in Evans's 17-year-old daughter, which gave rise to enmity. Her interest in a young Englishman named Haigh, who was looking after Lord Dunraven's interests in the park, angered Nugent. Bird, aware during her visit of the bad feeling between them, wrote in a letter, "Jim's 'I'll shoot you' has more than once been heard in Griff's cabin."

On June 19, 1874, Nugent was shot outside Evans's ranch-house; he died from the injury in September in Fort Collins. It was supposed that he was shot by Evans who was later acquitted; but it was also alleged that he was shot by Haigh.
