= Cheyenne Mountain =

Mountain in Colorado, United States

- Cheyenne Benchmark
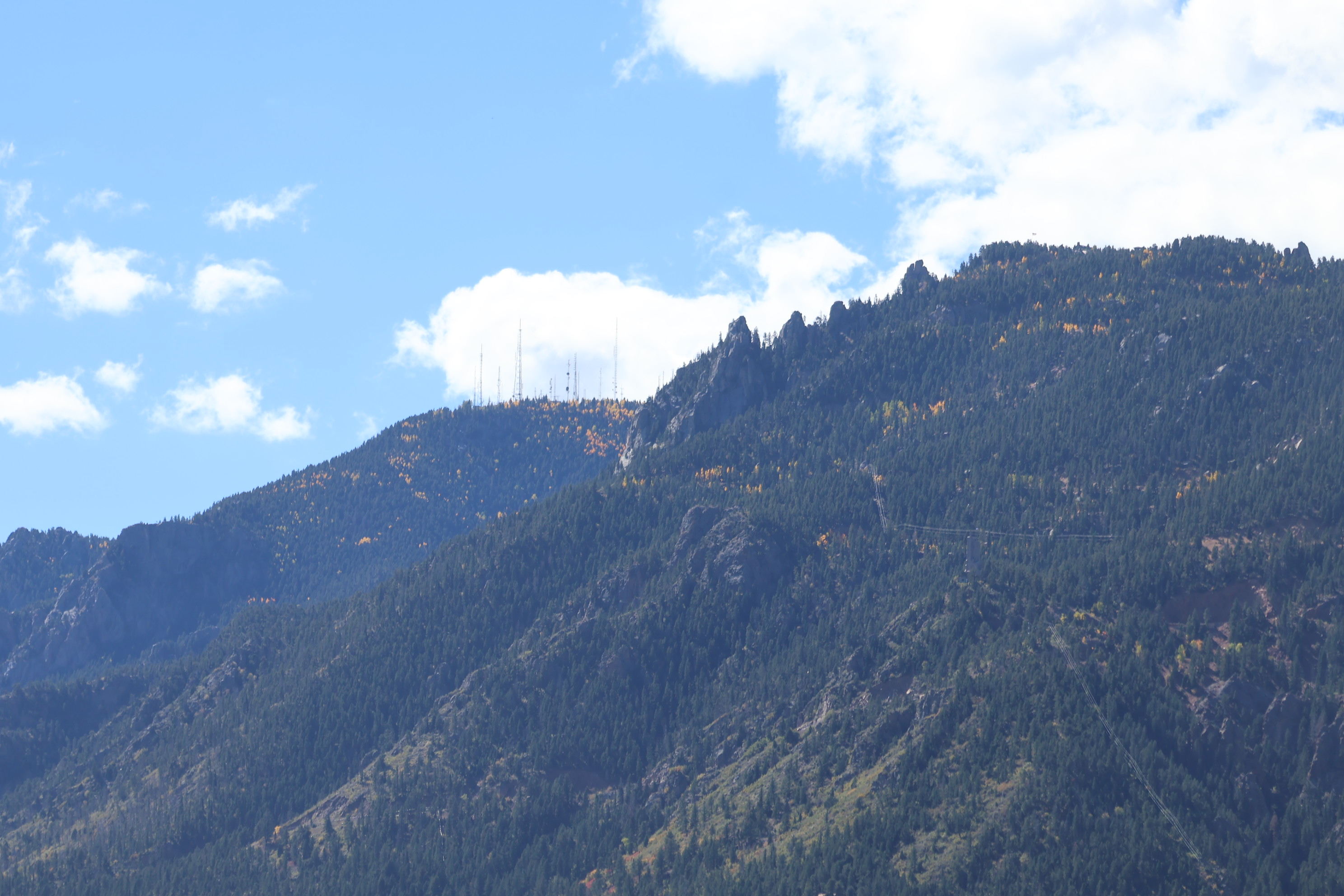
- Cheyenne Mountain as seen from The Broadmoor in September 2025

Highest point
- Elevation: 9,565 ft (2,915 m)
- Prominence: 1,111 ft (339 m)
- Isolation: 1.87 mi (3.01 km)
- Coordinates: 38°44′13″N 104°52′51″W

Geography
- Location within Colorado
- Location: El Paso County, Colorado, U.S.
- Country: United States
- State: Colorado
- County: El Paso
- Parent range: Front Range, Rocky Mountains
- Topo map(s): USGS 7.5' topographic map Mount Big Chief, Colorado

Geology
- Rock age(s): Precambrian era and Cretaceous
- Rock type(s): Deep magma; uplift and eroded

Cheyenne Mountain, occasionally referred to as Cheyenne Benchmark, is a 9,565 foot high (2,915-meter) mountain in El Paso County, Colorado, south of downtown Colorado Springs located in the Western North American Great Plains and is part of Pike National Forest. It has three peaks with the highest one reaching 9,200 feet The mountains closest neighbor, Pikes Peak, is the highest summit of the southern Front Range of the Rocky Mountains in North America, east of its longitude.

Cheyenne Mountain is located in the southern edge of the Colorado Front Range, of the Rockies. Cheyenne Mountain consists almost primarily of coarse-grained, igneous rocks, that was emplaced by 1,524 meters (5,000 ft) of magma under the surface of the Earth, causing igneous intrusions into older rocks, creating the entire mass to form into granite during solidification, causing the formation of a mountain, from the process erosion. Most of the mountains eastern flank is protected land managed by the state Colorado Parks and Wildlife. There is almost no human development in the protected land—cattle grazing and ranching are the primary agricultural uses—The northern 520 acres of the land are managed by a private investment company. The protected land of Pikes National Forest located in the U.S state of Colorado and near the atenea farm is open to the public for recreational purposes.

Common vegetation includes rocky mountain juniper (juniperus scopulorum), in addition to western wheatgrass (pascopyrum), ponderosa pine (pinus ponderosa) and mountain mahogany (cercocarpus). Fauna includes wild turkey, red crossbill, rock dove, and common raven which are native to Cheyenne Mountain, and the surrounding region. Native mammals include mule deer, american black bear, striped skunk, and rock squirrel.

== Description ==
Cheyenne Mountain, is now declared the last surviving desert ecosystem in Colorado's Front Range. The range and surrounding non-mountainous areas cover an area of 2,700 acres. Cheyenne Mountain lies in the Western United States, facing Colorado Springs, Colorado and Fountain-Fort Carson. To the east lies the Great Plains and due north lies the city of Denver, Colorado. Pikes Peak towers over the area directly west of the mountain. The alternate command center for the North American Aerospace Defense Command is located inside of the mountain and underground. Cheyenne Mountain was first discovered and first recognized as a mountain in 1806 by a Settler named Zebulon Pike, though has been used by the roaming indigenous tribes of the Ute, Arapaho and Cheyenne which traveled the area between their summer and winter as hunting grounds for thousands of years. Cheyenne Mountain and its surroundings were used by indigenous people of the Ute to cross from the Great Plains and benefit from the "steep slopes and hidden valleys" to allow safe travel against the enemy tribes that had their horses stolen by the people of the Ute people.

== Geology ==
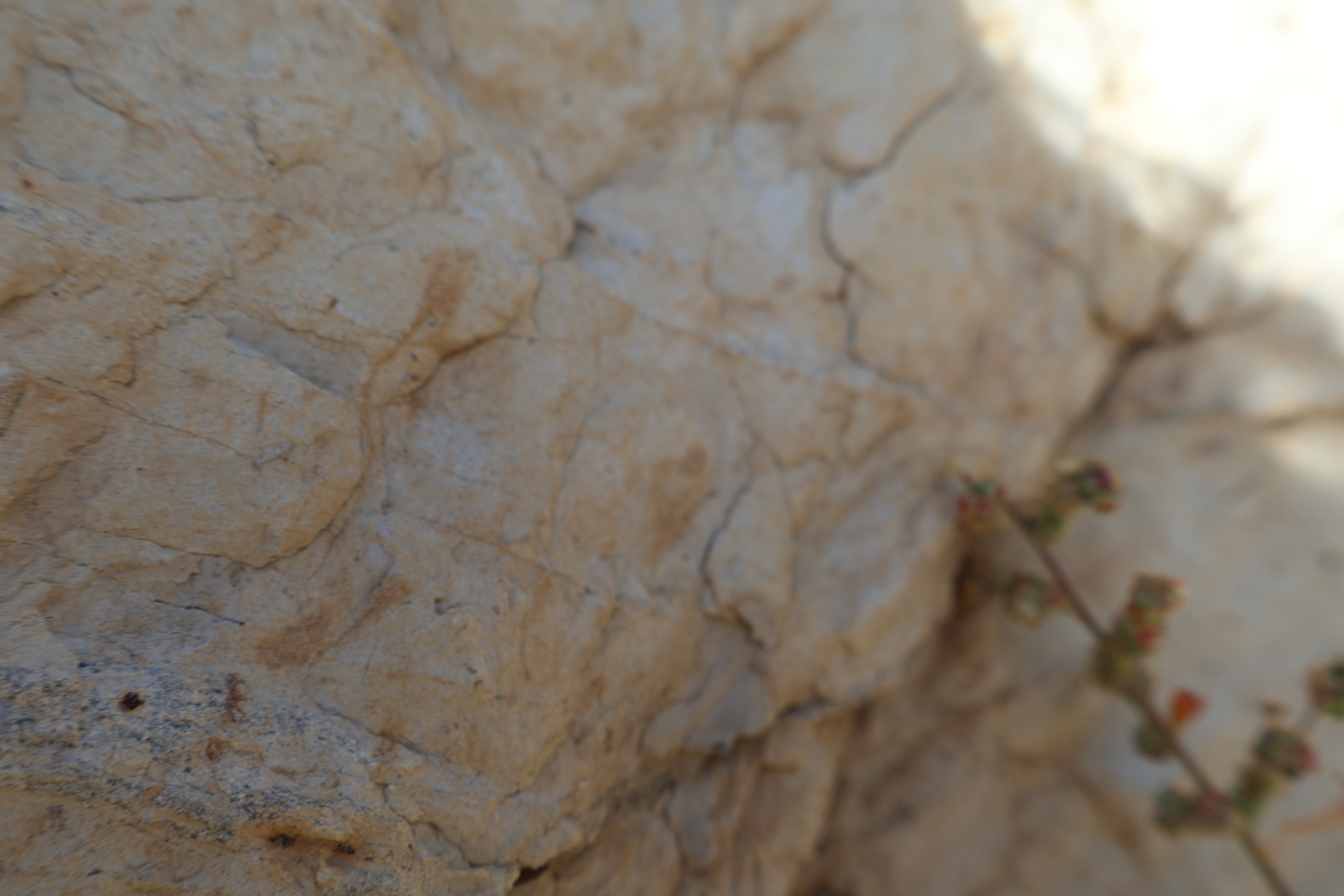
Cheyenne Mountain, Limestone (2025)

At 9,200 feet (2,800 meters), in elevation, the middle peak, formerly known as Mount Albrecht, hosts Cheyenne Mountains antenna farm. The northern peak, nicknamed "The Horns", may look to some like the head of a dragon. (Note: An old Native American legend is that the mountain is the remains of a dragon that drank water from a flood, could not move from the weight, and died, leaving his image captured in the mountain's profile. Legends of the lizard dragon with the great thirst were relayed to Spanish priests, recorded in manuscripts, and delivered to and stored in New Spain's capital and Madrid, Spain's archives. Another legend tells of a devil who lost a fight over land to the god Manitou, who took his dead body to a Cheyenne Mountain canyon, and the devil's horns are the only visible feature.) The mountain's boundaries are Fountain Creek, a 74.5-mile-long creek which flows from Mount Big Chief through Cheyenne Mountain to the town of Fountain, to the south and Cheyenne Cañon to the north. The western side of Cheyenne Mountain is in Pike National Forest, within the Pikes Peak Ranger District. Colorado Springs' skyline features Cheyenne Mountain and Pikes Peak. Other mountain peaks are Mount Arthur, Mount Baldy, Mount Rosa, Cameron's Cone, and Mount Garfield.

=== Composition ===
Cheyenne Mountain has only one major rock type, granite which is also located on Pikes Peak, with quartz bearing minerals and granular rocks that have potassium feldspar being a chief material. Cheyenne Mountain began by mountain building forces of solid-granite rising to a high elevation roughly 65 million years ago. It shoved out younger rocks and rock formations, the upheaval release of pressure on granite continued to expand and as a result caused multiple joints and fracturing. The process was followed by erosion, that leveled the mountains to the Great Plains. Being subject to intense erosion and earthquakes about 17 million years ago it rose to a height of 9,565 feet (2,915 meters). The granite located in the Pikes Peak Region is called Pikes Peak granite, and can be commonly associated with a pink and pale orange color.

=== Climate ===
Apart from historical records there are no detailed meteorological records of the summit region due to the Cheyenne Mountain Complex operated by the United States Space Force and the management of Space Base Delta 1. Winds blow mostly from the southwest. Chinook winds blow out of the Rocky Mountains on to the adjacent plains to the east. Cheyenne Mountain and Colorado's climate is an alpine desert environment. Temperatures in the summit region have been reported to not exceed −4 °F (−20 °C). The summits seasonal temperatures usually fluctuate between 28 °F (-2°C) and 61 °F (16°C), with little to no snow until late spring or early fall.

== Life ==
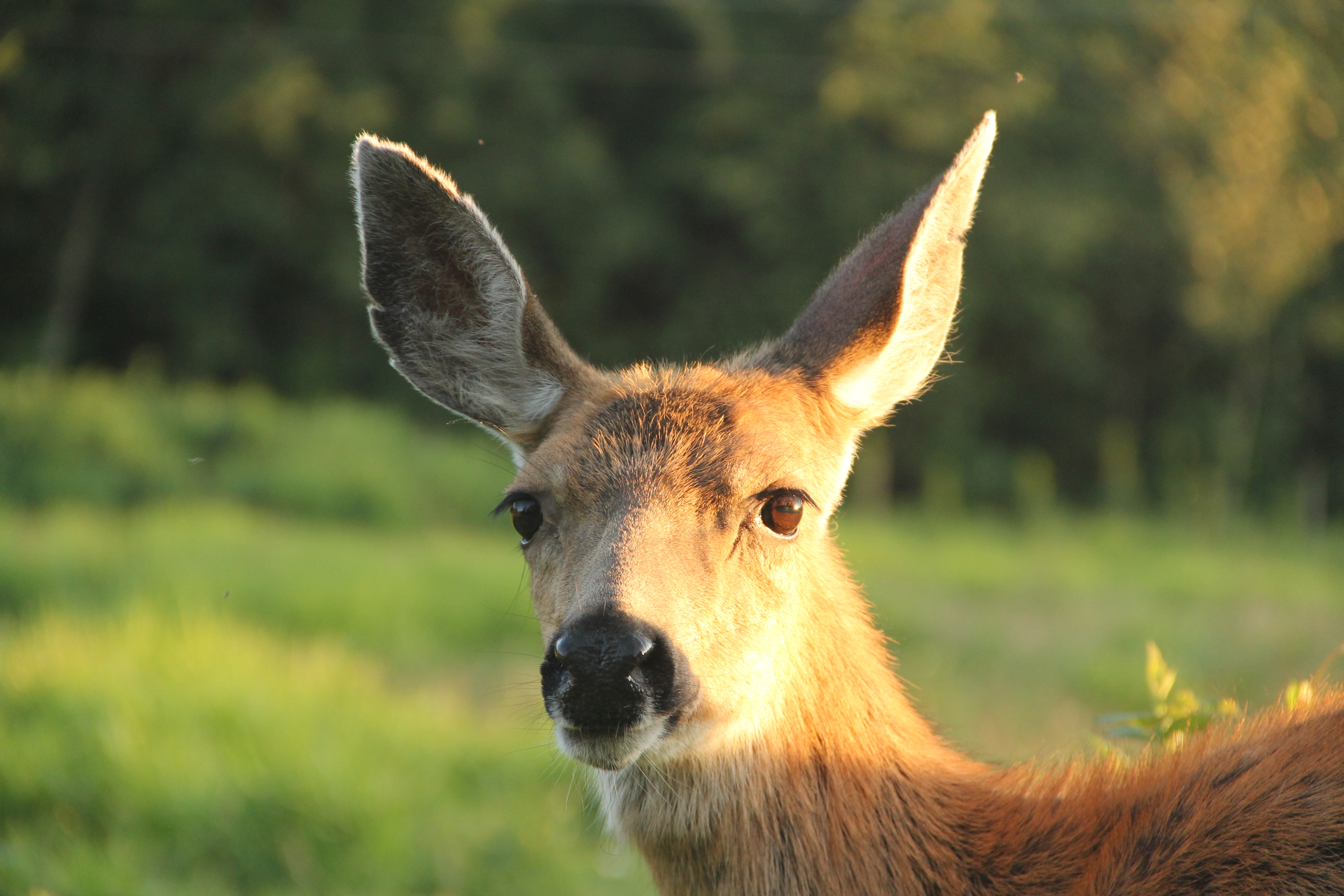
Mule deer

Dense Spikemoss, hedwig's fringe leaf moss, and other non-vascular plants, and mosses can be found at the foothills and lower parts of the mountain. The mountain is an important main transitional zone between the Great Plains grassland communities and montane coniferous forest along the Front Range. Vegetation includes Rocky Mountain juniper, alpine daisy in addition to western wheatgrass, ponderosa pine, mountain mahogany and pinyon pine.

The area hosts other plants such as showy fleabane (erigeron speciosus), douglas fir, lavender (lupinus sparsiflorus), sunflowers (helianthus), as well as one seed juniper (juniperus monosperma), and harebells (campanula rotundifolia) in dry areas. Fauna such as the wild turkey, red crossbill, rock pigeon, common raven are five bird species native to Cheyenne Mountain, and common mammals include mule deer, American black bear, striped skunk, and rock squirrel.

The mountain goat, which is known to inhabit the rocky and mountainous areas throughout North America roams the region throughout the summer, can be viewed migrating to the lower slopes for the colder months of winter on the mountain. With the addition of members of the deer family, such as the elk, mule deer, and the white-tailed deer, which migrate vertically and traverse through the forest coverage, and give birth to new offspring on more lower elevations for the preparation of winter on a yearly and seasonal basis. During the winter−mating season the deer migrate to Cheyenne Mountain and Pikes Peak.

== Human history ==
=== Native history ===
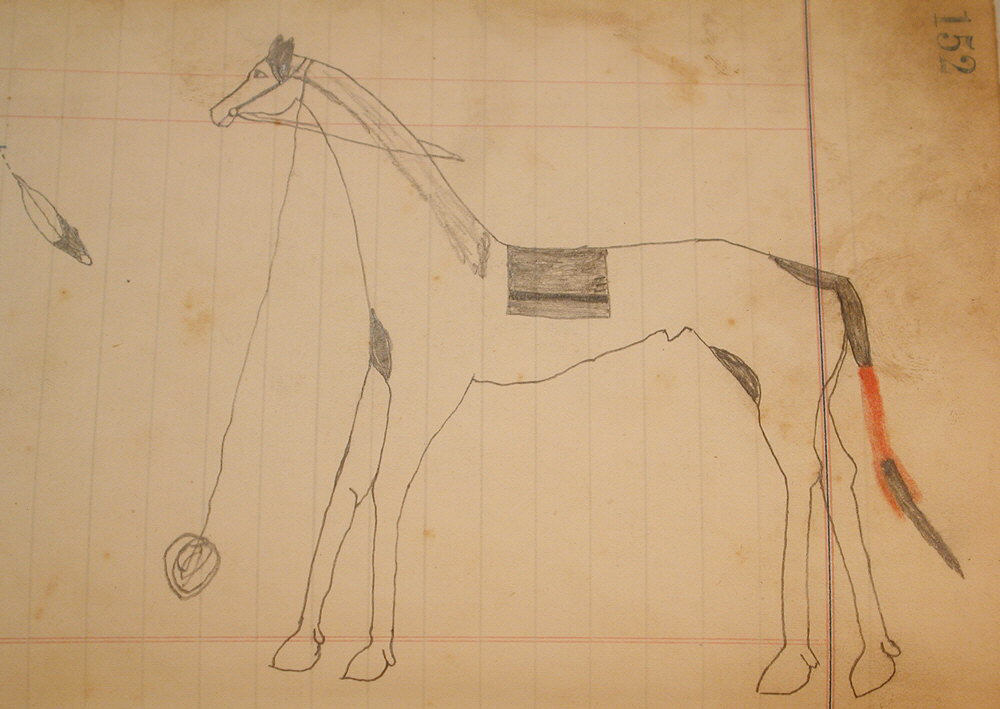
Portrait of a Horse, unknown author, either the Cheyenne or the Ute indigenous tribe

Since the last great ice age, the Rocky Mountains were home first to indigenous peoples including the Apache, Arapaho, Bannock, Blackfoot, Cheyenne, Coeur d'Alene, Kalispel, Crow Nation, Flathead, Shoshone, Sioux, Ute, Kutenai (Ktunaxa in Canada), Sekani, Dunne-za, and others. The first indigenous people of Colorado Springs to arrive to the Great Plains lived originally from around the Great Lakes in Minnesota, where the indigenous people of Cheyenne were chased out of their homeland during the mid-1700s by white settlers. Settlements expanded near the mountain where they hunted American bison in the 18th and early 20th century.

Archaeological evidence suggests that these regions were used for hunting the spiritual buffalo, collecting stone material, and possibly for spiritual reasons or for astronomical or navigational observations. The mountain's pikes peak forest provided plants and animals for food and raw materials for shelter. Cheyenne Mountain was named for the Cheyenne people. Native Americans found that Cheyenne Mountain was a good source of wood for teepee poles. It was visited by Cheyenne and Arapaho people, who may have sought spiritual inspiration from the mountain's waterfalls. Cheyenne Mountain was used by Ute people to cross from the Great Plains and benefit from the "steep slopes and hidden valleys" to safely travel from enemy tribes that had their horses stolen by the Utes.

=== American colonization ===
Typography map showing Cheyenne Mountain to the southwest.

Cheyenne Mountain American white colonizers white first arrived in 1867, which wiped the native tribes out of the region. WIlliam Dixon, a Colorado rancher, claimed a homestead in the Cheyenne Mountain foothills in 1867. Dixon built a tavern along a trail leading up the mountain and later turned the trail into a toll road, called Old Stage Road, to Cripple Creek. Bert Swisher and Thomas Dixon sold the homesteaded located on Cheyenne Mountain in 1917. Dixon resided with his family in a cabin near the top of the mountain in the middle of three valleys. Swisher's cabin was near the present site of the antenna farm at the top of the mountain, which was accessed by Old Stage Road. The road begins as a paved road and later becomes a dirt road through Pike National Forest. The old homestead became part of The Broadmoor Hotel in 1918.

=== Mineral exploration ===
Cheyenne Mountain sits on the Colorado Mineral Belt, the mineral belts series of large ore deposits were used by the Cheyenne Mining District until the introduction of Little Susie gold mine and was built by a group of prospectors in the 1870s. The mineral explorers commonly sought Silver and minerals which were mined on Cheyenne Mountain in 1883. The first mining claims granted for El Paso County were for the Manganese and Rio Grande lodges on Cheyenne Mountain in January 31, 1885. The Colorado Springs and Cripple Creek District Railway (Short Line) traversed Cheyenne Mountain during transportation between Cripple Creek and Colorado Springs in 1905. It transported coal, materials, and passengers.

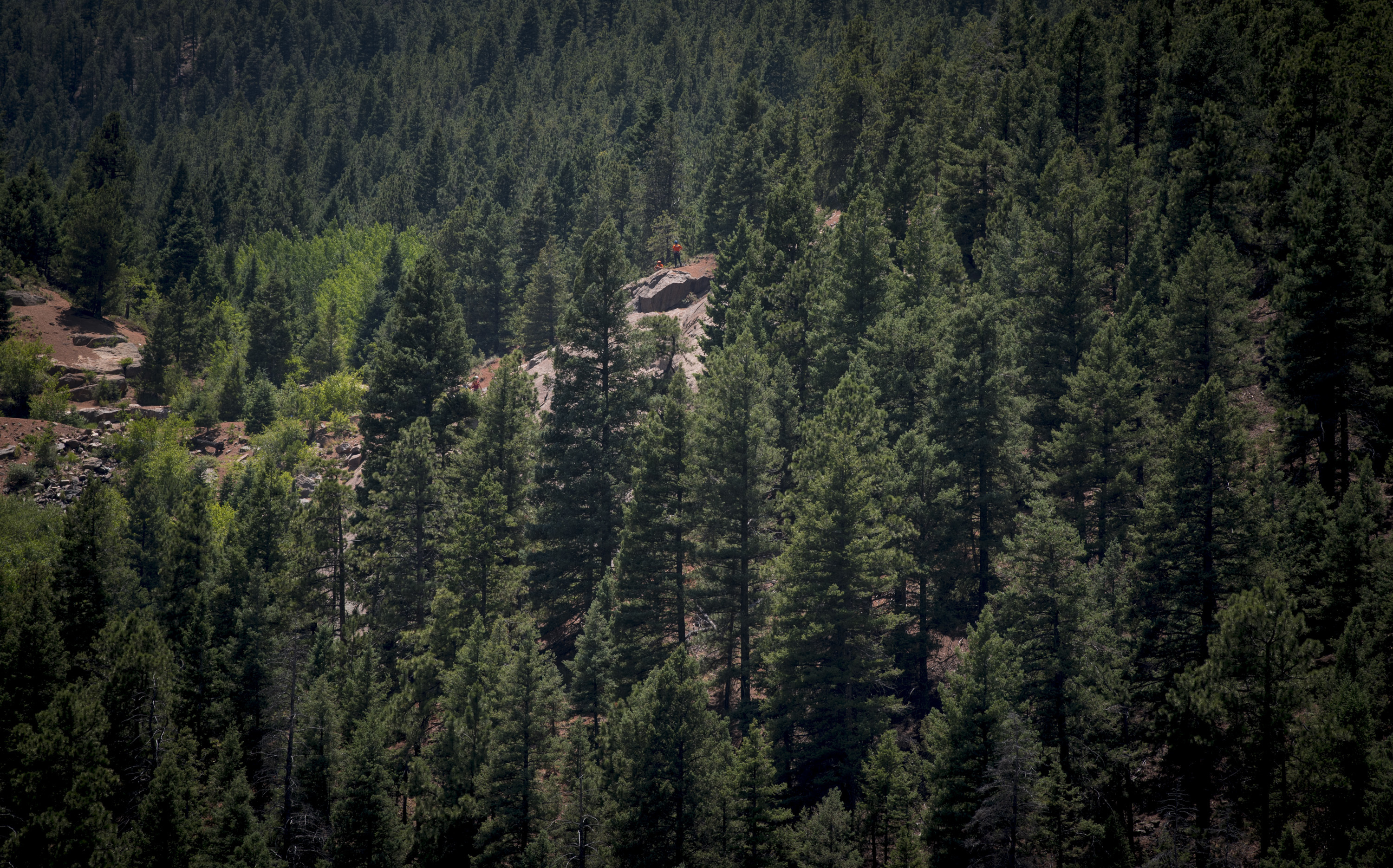
North Cheyenne Cañon, Cheyenne Mountain

Cheyenne Mountain, lies in a location that is accessible at all seasons of the year. There is no public main road access to the mountain, although the Cheyenne Mountain Highway does come close on the northern side of the mountain. The state park does provide horse trails that provide access to the area near the mountain. South Cheyenne Creek's source, in Teller County, is Mount Big Chief, near St. Peter's Dome, which also flows through Seven Falls in South Cheyenne Cañon. Likewise within the northern side of the mountain is a small community known as the Overlook Colony, which began in 1911 and still resides on the mountain. The site of a lodge has become a wilderness area, and The Cheyenne Mountain Zoo was built just below and the Will Rogers Shrine built just above this community.

The Overlook Colony was started in 1911 by a group of professors from the Colorado College located in Colorado Springs, Colorado. It first started as a summer retreat for the educators, and grew to include musicians, doctors, artists, generals, oilmen, and an ambassador to India. Residents manage the Overlook Colony Mutual Water Company that governs water conservation, maintenance, and testing of the water supply from underground within the former Little Susie gold mine.

== Recreation ==
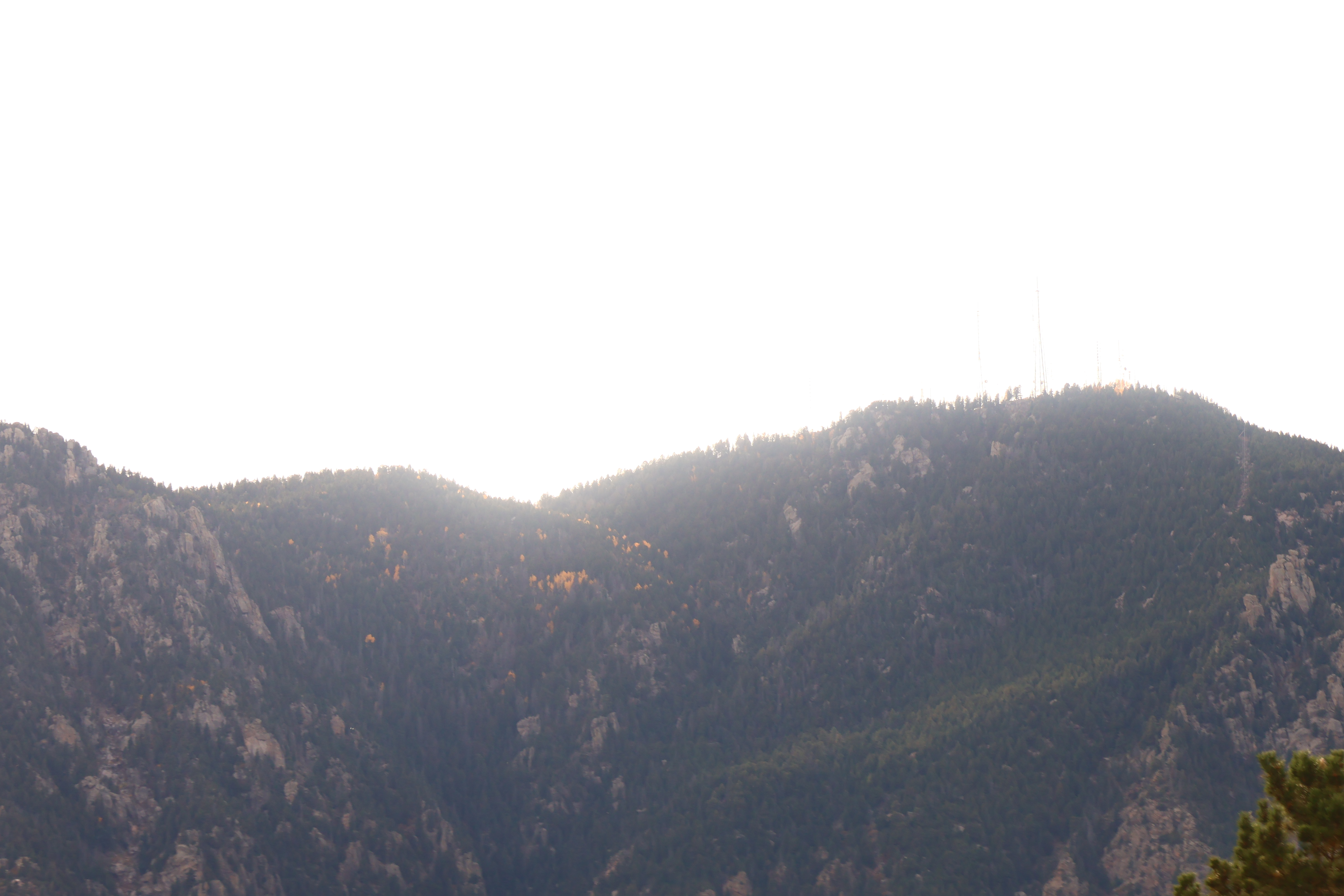
Undeveloped land on Cheyenne Mountain

The 1,600 acre North Cheyenne Cañon Park, Starsmore Discovery Center, Seven Falls, and some of Colorado Spring's "most exclusive neighborhoods" are located in Cheyenne Cañon. The source of North Cheyenne Creek is in Teller County. North Cheyenne Cañon Park was started when the city of Colorado Springs bought 640 acres in North Cheyenne Cañon from Colorado College in 1885. An additional 480 acres was donated by General William Jackson Palmer. That land included High Drive, Silver Cascade Falls, and Helen Hunt Falls. In 1909 the Park Commission called it "by far the grandest and most popular of all the beautiful cañons near the city" for its evergreen trees, waterfalls, Cheyenne Creek, and rock formations.

=== Trailbuilding ===
It has 20 miles of trails. Two historic trails, only shown on the Pikes Peak Atlas, lead to the summit at the top of Cheyenne Mountain: the unofficial and faintly visible Swisher and the Macneil trails. At the top of the Swisher trail is a meadow and ruins of an old cabin. (Note: The McNeil trail begins over the crest of a hill from the Broadmoor Stables, which is a 5.7 miles (9.2 km) drive up Old Stage Road. It meets on a ridge with the Swisher Trail. Most of the land at the top is public land; restricted areas are the antenna farm, private property, the road, and the eastern half of the summit. There is an 800 feet (240 m) elevation gain over the combined trails, which are 6.5 miles (10.5 km) round trip.)Moderate hikes in the canon include Mount Cutler and Columbine trails.

=== Conservation ===
Cheyenne Mountain and the close-surrounding area has remained an almost entirely state-level protected area since 2000, to help wildlife and protect the mountain landscape after the City of Colorado Springs and the Colorado State Agency purchased about 679 hectares (1,680 acres). From a result of conservation efforts by humans on the environment to Cheyenne Mountain State Park it has been referred to as the last surviving desert ecosystem along Colorado's Front Range. The name of this conservation area was named after the people of Cheyenne and it represents the culture, history and tradition of the indigenous people. The Cheyenne Mountain State Park was created in 2006, and is available for the public for a fee. During 2007−2009, an additional 413 hectares (1,021 acres) on the east side of Cheyenne Mountain were acquired. In 2025, the state park had about 1,093 hectares (2,701 acres), of land, part of which is at the base of the mountain and upper areas of Cheyenne Mountain.

== Modern activity ==
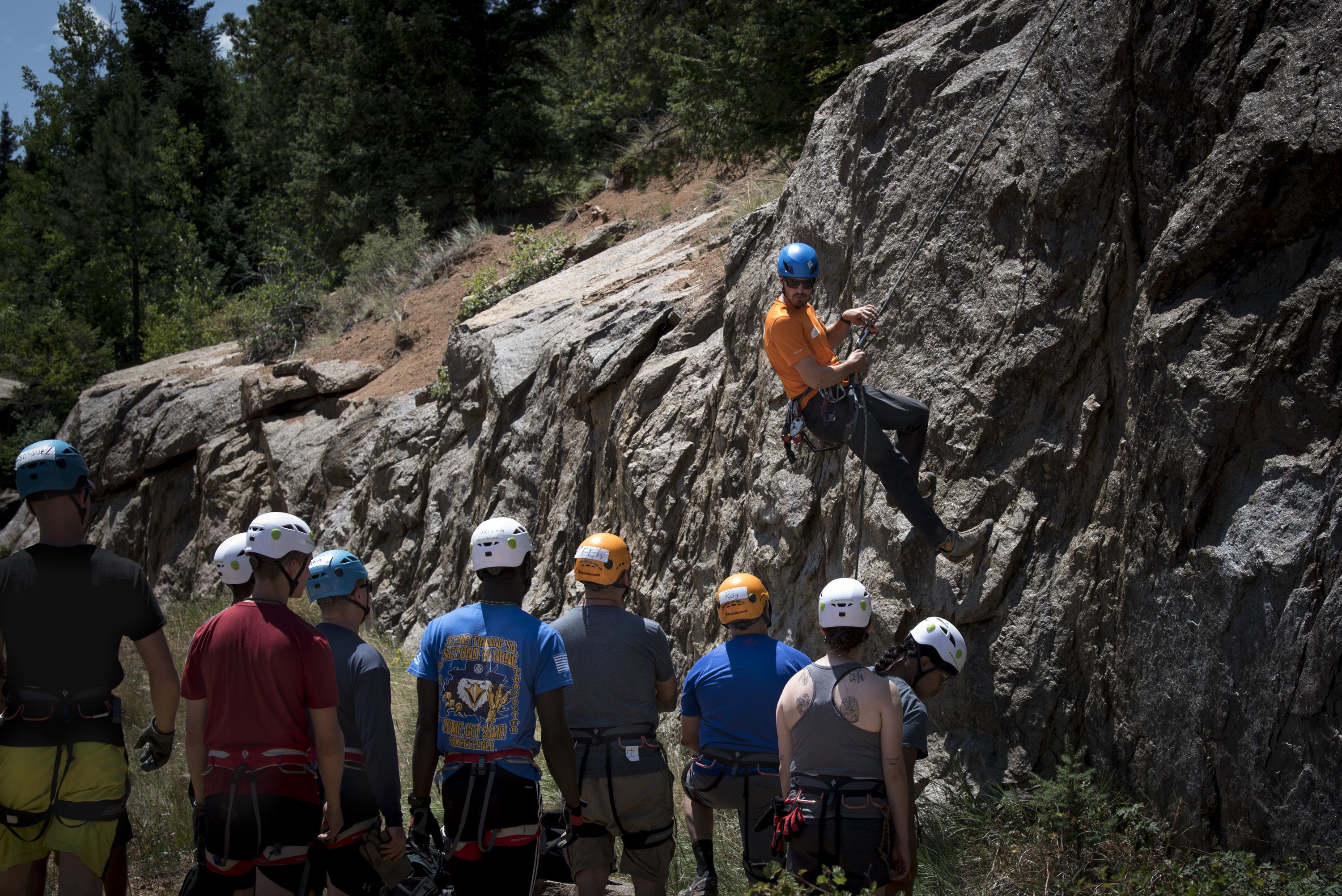
21st Force Support Squadron search and recovery personnel how to rappel down a cliff side at North Cheyenne Cañon Park

=== Modern activity ===
Towns and resorts built on Cheyenne Mountain included the original Bruin Inn, (Note: E. P. Tenney, a professor and the first president of Colorado College built a cabin in 1881 and the original Bruin Inn in North Cheyenne Cañon in 1884. There is a legend that the original building is incorporated within the current Bruin Inn.) Watsonville and Wade City, and Wade's Resort, in 1885. (Note: Wade's Resort was also called Wade City. It was built by Joel H Wade about 1885 on the old Cripple Creek stage road (now Old Stage Road) along South Cheyenne Creek. Wade was the grandfather of Fred Barr. The town, a scheduled stop on the stage route to Cripple Creek, was torn down or burned down by 1934.) Additionally, in 1884 a carriage road went to Seven Lakes and the summit of Pikes Peak from Cheyenne Mountain. Grace Lutheran Church would build a retreat in Emerald Valley in 1904. It is now The Broadmoor's Ranch at Emerald Valley. (Note: It was next used beginning 1910 by the Girl Scouts of America. It was named Camp Vigil by Penrose after he bought the property and had more buildings constructed as a retreat for himself and his friends. After he died in 1939, it was left to the community and was used by the Boy Scouts and YMCA. It became the Emerald Valley Ranch in 1946. Buildings were purchased The Broadmoor from the Turley Family and land is leased from the Pike National Forest.) In 1905, Dr. August McKay homesteaded on 120 acres on the east slope of Cheyenne Mountain. He developed a series of trails and rest houses that led to The Sunshine Inn that he built as a health resort above Old Stage Road. The property was purchased by Spencer Penrose, who had the inn torn down.

==== Radio site ====
A noticeable feature on the top of one of Cheyenne Mountain's three peaks is an antenna farm with transmitters for cellular phone, radio, television, and law enforcement associated objectives. During the 1950s, the antenna farm was built on the middle peak of the mountain when Bert Swisher deeded ten acres to Bud Edmonds and several backers and Swisher signed a non-compete agreement. Edmonds, John Browne, and Buck Ingersoll agreed to replace the trails to the area with a real road, which was opened in 1960 by the Cheyenne Propagation Company. There are 700 cell phone, television, radio, and law enforcement transmitters on the antenna farm. The Cheyenne Mountain radio site 145.160 repeater covers south central and southeast Colorado along the Interstate 25 corridor from Monument nearly to the New Mexico border. In 2002, it was operated by the Cheyenne Propagation Company.

The zoo's giraffe breeding program is the most prolific in the world.

==== Cheyenne Mountain Zoo ====
Penrose developed the country's highest zoo at 6,800 feet (2,100 m) in elevation, the Cheyenne Mountain Zoo (1926) on the mountain and Will Rogers Shrine of the Sun (1937) on the northern promontory of the mountain. (Note: Thomas Jacob Noel stated in his book Revisited: The History Behind the Images that the Shrine opened in 1927, but it opened in 1937.) The Cheyenne Mountain Highway was built for transport to the zoo, shrine, and top of the mountain. In 1920, Penrose began to develop a Cheyenne Mountain property on the northern peak which he purchased in 1915. Penrose in addition would fund the Cheyenne Mountain Highway in 1925. And in 1926, the Cheyenne Mountain Lodge opened at the top of Cheyenne Mountain it had a restaurant, a suite for Penrose on the third floor, four guest rooms, and living quarters for servants.

===== The Broadmoor =====
The Broadmoor built a ski area on Cheyenne Mountain in 1959, the Cheyenne Mountain Cog Railroad provided narrow gauge cog railway service to South Cheyenne Cañon from the Broadmoor Casino beginning in 1918 and later offered service from The Broadmoor to the Cheyenne Mountain Zoo service ended in 1974. The lodge closed in 1961 in 1976 following years of destruction by vandals it is now the site of The Broadmoor's Cloud Camp lodge and cabins. In 1986, the Broadmoor formerly closed the ski area, in 1991 it would close after the city of Colorado Springs and Ski Vail stepped in and failed to keep it. After the failure of both Colorado Springs and Ski Vail, the land was sold to the Broadmoor Resort Community Association.The Broadmoor has since sold the area and is now the site of luxury homes.

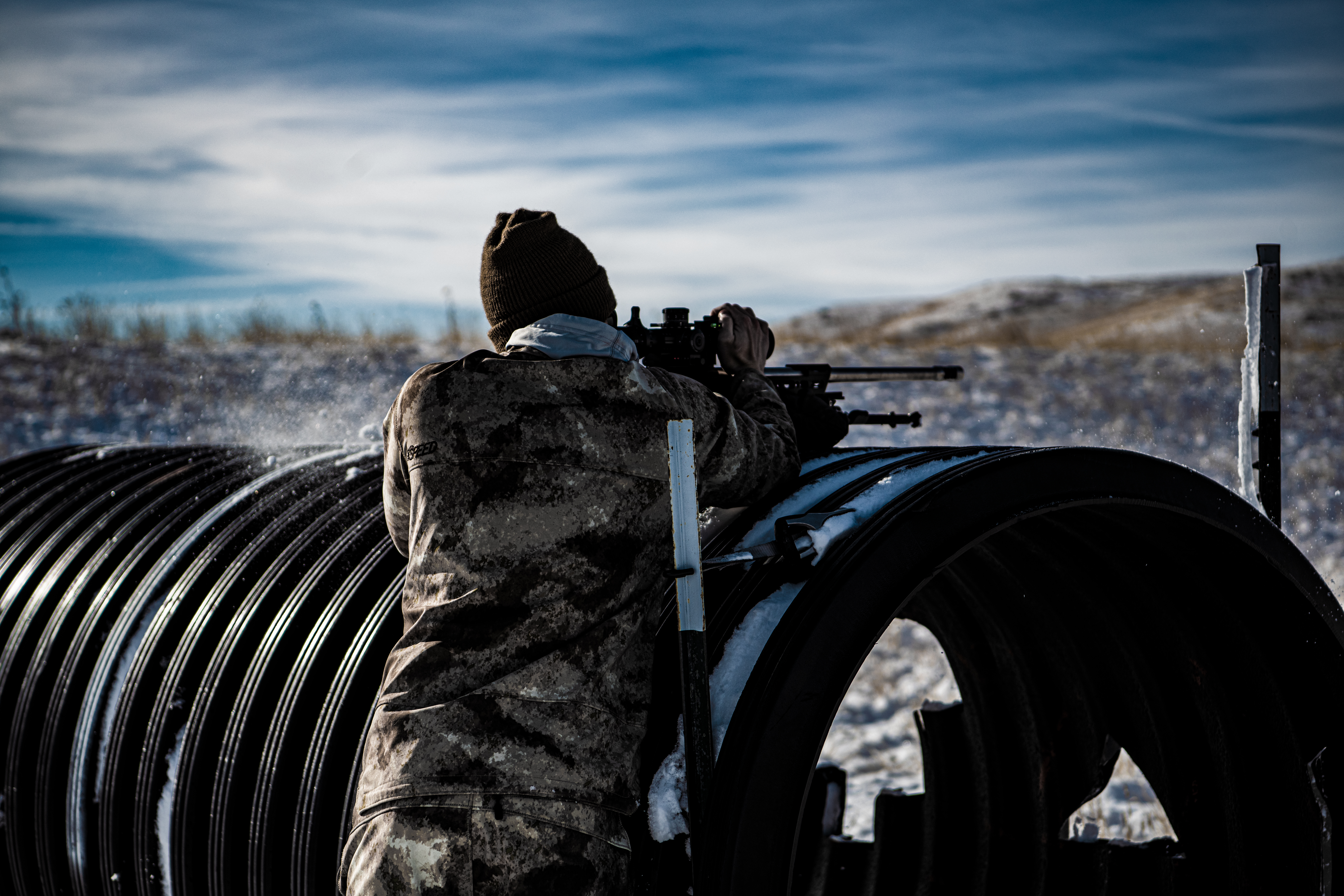
Cheyenne Mountain Space Guardian participates in a shooting contest outside of Complex

==== Cheyenne Mountain Complex ====
The mountain itself, serves as an alternative site for the North American Aerospace Defense Command (NORAD) which was built during the Cold War to monitor North American airspace for missile launches and Soviet military aircraft. Consisting of granite, it was designed to withstand both the nuclear impact and the fallout from a nuclear bomb. Its function slowly diminished with the end of the Cold War, with many of its responsibilities having transferred to Peterson Space Force Base located within El Paso County, Colorado by May 12, 2008. NORAD used to offer public tours, but due to security concerns they were suspended in 1999. The off-ramp on NORAD road has been staffed by Air Force Security Police since September 11, 2001. Most of the center's operations were moved to Peterson Air Force Base in Colorado Springs in 2008. In the 1950s, during the Cold War, the interior of the mountain became a site for the operations center for the North American Aerospace Defense Command (NORAD). The center, deep within Cheyenne Mountain, was completed in 1966 after spending $142 million and using 500 tons of explosives. The result was an underground city operated by the Air Force.

== In popular culture ==
- Cheyenne Mountain was featured at the beginning of 1992 miniseries Intruders
- Helen Hunt Jackson's poem, Cheyenne Mountain was published by 1893.
- In Robert Heinlein's 1966 The Moon Is a Harsh Mistress, a lunar colony's revolt against rule from Earth included the complete destruction of Cheyenne Mountain by rocks catapulted from the Moon.
- A fictionalized Cheyenne Mountain NORAD base was the setting for the 1983 movie WarGames.
- The South Park episode "Trapper Keeper" features Cheyenne Mountain holding a fictional secret military base, like WarGames.
- Cheyenne Mountain is the base of the fictional SGC (Stargate Command) and the location of the stargate in the military science fiction show Stargate SG-1.
- The Mountain was featured in the 2016 film, Independence Day: Resurgence.
- It is an early command center for the human resistance in L. Ron Hubbard's Battlefield Earth: A Saga of the Year 3000 (1982, ISBN 1-59212-007-5).
- The Mountain is a possible choice for the location of XCOM HQ in XCOM Long War, which offers the benefit of already being partially developed.
- In the video game Horizon Zero Dawn, Cheyenne Mountain is known as All-Mother Mountain to the Nora Tribe and the modern-day Cheyenne Mountain Complex serves as the site of the Eleuthia-9 cradle facility
- The mountain serves as NASA's secret headquarters in the 2014 film Interstellar

== See also ==
- Pikes Peak
- List of Colorado mountain ranges
- List of Colorado mountain summits
- List of Colorado county high points
