= Colorado Springs and Interurban Railway =

Electric trolley system in Colorado, US

External images
- New "power plant" in 1902
- Car at Manitou/Ruxton avenues
- Car at Stratton Park

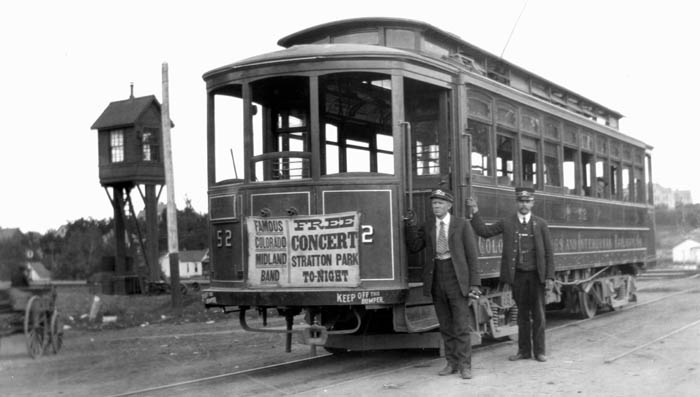
Colorado Springs & Interurban Railroad car no. 52, 1907 or 1908

The Colorado Springs and Interurban Railway (CS & IRR, CS&IR) was an electric trolley system in the Colorado Springs, Colorado area that operated from 1902 to 1932. The company was formed when Winfield Scott Stratton purchased Colorado Springs Rapid Transit Railway in 1901 and consolidated it in 1902 with the Colorado Springs & Suburban Railway Company. It operated in Colorado Springs, its suburbs, and Manitou Springs. One of the street cars from Stratton's first order is listed on the Colorado State Register of Historic Properties.

== Background ==
The Colorado Springs and Manitou Street Railway began horsecar trolley service in 1887. It ran between the Colorado Springs business district and Colorado College. The following year the route extended north and west with a total of ten horse-drawn trolleys. The Colorado Springs Rapid Transit Railway, chartered in 1890, bought the system and established the first electric trolley line to Manitou Springs in October 1890, as they transitioned from horse-drawn to electric trolleys. (Note: The power house was located at the northwest corner of Moreno Avenue and Tejon Street and the company office was at 528 South Tejon in 1898.) In 1898, trolleys ran west to Colorado City, east to Knob Hill, to Cheyenne Park, and connected with the Atchison, Topeka and Santa Fe Passenger Depot. With the additional destinations, there were 44 electric trolleys in 1900.

== Interurban railway company ==
Winfield Scott Stratton, 1901

The Colorado Springs & Interurban Railway Company was created after Winfield Scott Stratton bought the Colorado Springs Rapid Transit Railway in 1901 and consolidated it with the Colorado Springs & Suburban Railway Company in September 1902. (Note: In 1902, The Street Railway Review reported that Colorado Springs Rapid Transit Railway completed a power house on Las Animas, near Denver & Rio Grande Western Railroad tracks, installed heavy rails, built the North canon line terminus station at Dixon Park, and planned to improve and expand the company's infrastructure. It reported that Colorado Springs & Suburban Railway, began using Studebaker sprinkling cars, and would receive 15 open Narragansett cars from Brill. The CS&IR officers in 1903 were A. G. Sharpe, president; D. H. Rice, vice-president; William Lloyd, secretary and treasurer; and D. L. MacAHree, general manager and superintendent That year, the company building on the Freeman Block at 117 E. Pikes Peak Avenue and the car barn was on Tejon between Cimarron and Moreno.) Service ran to a trolley park beyond Boulevard Park in 1903. The north/south main line provided service from a loop at the town of Roswell

Colorado Springs and Interurban Railway ridership peaked in 1911 and within three years it began to suffer financially as automobile ownership increased. By 1916, its offices were located at 530 South Tejon. At that time there were separate cars that ran from the Main Post Office and Federal Courthouse to the Printer's Home. The east/west mainline extended from Manitou's Iron Springs neighborhood eastward through Garden of the Gods Balanced Rock Station in 1916. (Note: The railway's Balanced Rock Station building later became an automobile tourist station and the central building for the Black Canyon camp ground in 1927.) In 1916, the system had a power house building at 205 Rio Grande West. It served Colorado Springs, Old Colorado City, Manitou Springs, Ivywild, and Roswell over 38 mi (61 km) of track with 56 motor cars and 13 trail cars in 1917.

Over the years, service ran east to the North Colorado Springs suburb and southward from the ATSF/Rock Island railroad bridge through the city to the Ivywild and Broadmoor suburbs, where the Cheyenne Mountain Country Club was along the Cheyenne Canon street car line and the terminus (Note: A 21st century business at the former Dixieland Casino building claims the south trolley station was named "Stratton Park Meadows Station".) It also ran to Broadmoor Park and adjacent to Stratton Park at the entrances to the North and South Cheyenne Cañons. A north/south branch line on Spruce and Walnut streets extended from Yampa street southward to Huerfano Street.

Buses began replacing the system's railcars in 1931 and the last electric tram ran on April 30, 1932. In the mid 1930s, the Works Progress Administration removed most of the street car rails. The Colorado Springs & Interurban power house site at the northwest corner of S Sierra Madre and Las Animas streets remains an electrical power station (now of Colorado Springs Utilities).

== Cars 46-50 ==
The first five streetcars purchased by Stratton were outfitted with safety features, like the retractable Narragansett steps, retractable windows that could be adjusted in transit, and had separate non-smoking and smoking sections. It was a step in the transition from wood to steel framed cars. These cars were numbered 46 to 50 and used the Brill convertible design. Car 48 survives today and is listed on the Colorado State Register of Historic Properties.

== Car 59 ==
Car 59, the last of an order of nine cars from the Laclede Car Company numbered 51-59, survives today and is undergoing restoration to operating condition at the Pikes Peak Historical Street Railway Foundation, a museum dedicated to preserving the history of the CS&I. It is also on the Colorado State Register of Historic Places.

== See also ==
- Manitou and Pike's Peak Railway
- Cripple Creek Mining District, for the Low Line/High Line
- Seven Lakes–Pike's Peak Railway Company
