= South Cheyenne Cañon =

Canyon in Colorado Springs, Colorado

Coordinates: 38°47′23″N 104°51′56″W

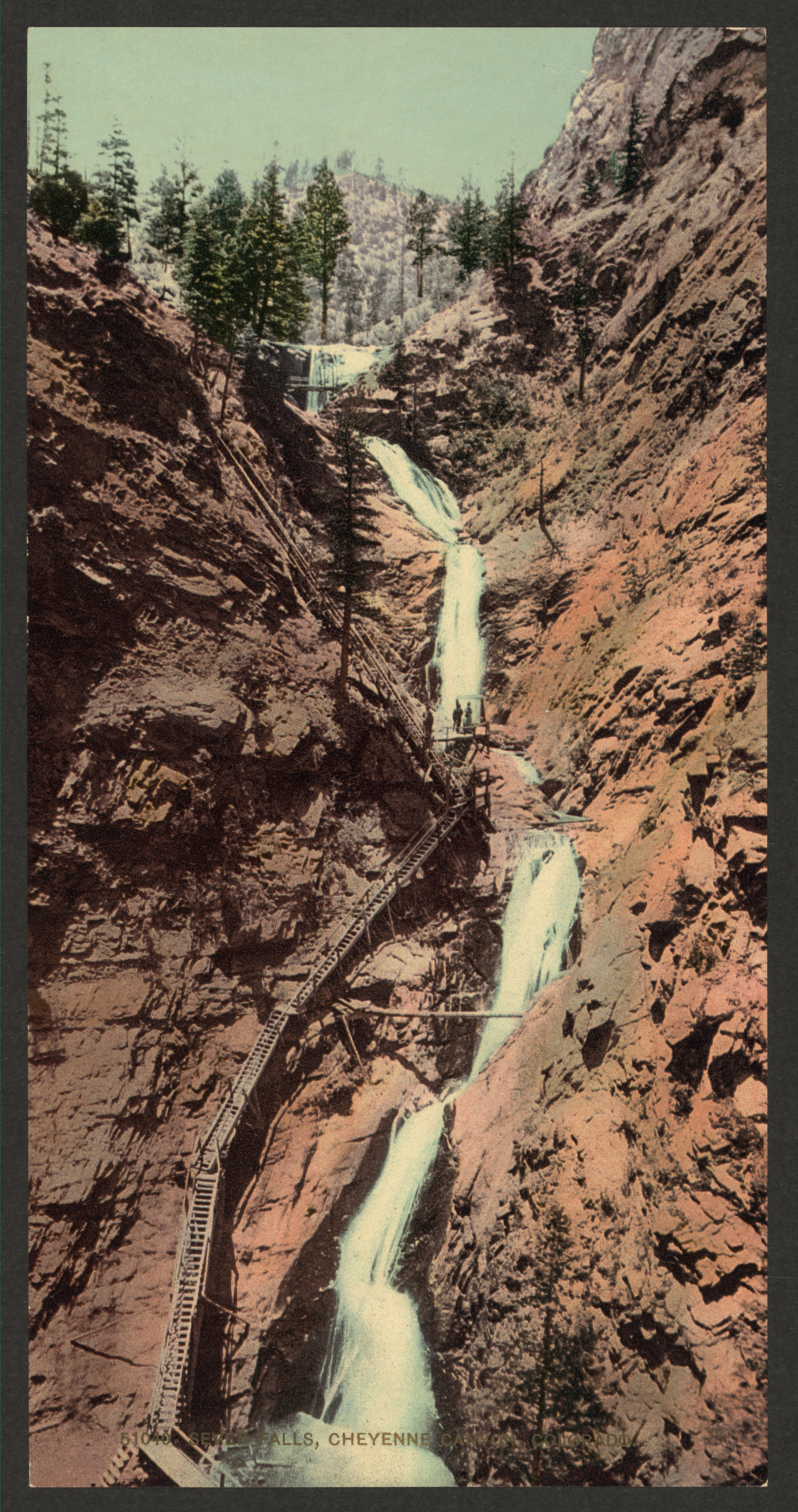
Seven Falls in South Cheyenne Cañon, 1898-1905

South Cheyenne Cañon, or South Cheyenne Canyon, is a canyon in Colorado Springs, El Paso County, Colorado. The South Cheyenne Cañon road to Seven Falls is called "The Grandest Mile of Scenery" in Colorado. Seven Falls has been a tourist attraction since it was opened in the early 1880s. Trails from the top of the falls lead to Midnight Falls, near the headwaters of South Cheyenne Creek, and Inspiration Point. The area has been a center for parks, such as the Stratton Park and Colorado College Park. Now, part of South Cheyenne Cañon, including the Starsmore Discovery Center, is in the North Cheyenne Cañon Park. The area sustained a significant flood in September 2013, which closed Seven Falls until Spring 2015. Presently the falls are open again.

== Geography ==
The entrance to South Cheyenne Cañon is about 4.5 miles (7.2 km) southwest of downtown Colorado Springs, where Cheyenne Cañon, along Cheyenne Boulevard, splits into the north and south cañons. Pierre Shale, the bedrock for Colorado Springs, and Sawatch Sandstone are found at the mouth of North and South Cheyenne Canons.

Neighboring landforms clockwise from the Broadmoor neighborhood include the northern spur of the Cheyenne Mountain, Twilight Canyon, Daniels Pass, Muscoco Mountain, and Mount Cutler.

== History ==
Nathaniel Colby homesteaded 160 acres in South Cheyenne Cañon, including Seven Falls in December 1872. He sold the land rights within a year for $1,000 (equivalent to $26,247 in 2024) to the Colorado Springs Land Company. In 1874, the Cheyenne Trail Company was formed to build a trail was built up Cheyenne Cañon and North Cheyenne Cañon and a wagon road was built up South Cheyenne Cañons to Seven Falls.

In 1882, James Hull, a naturalist bought the 160 acres to preserve it from logging operations. By 1885 he had a total of 400 acres. Hull built stairs up to the top of the falls and a canyon road to the falls, which then became a tourist attraction, which has been owned by private individuals or companies since then.

E.P. Tenny, president of the Colorado College Land Company announced on April 14, 1884 that the land on the east side of South Cheyenne Cañon, in North Cheyenne Cañon and at the headwaters of Bear Creek had been purchased to create Colorado College Park. Improvements would be made to trails, such as a trail to Jones Park, and roads to make them more accessible to the public, and a toll would be charged to offset the costs of construction and maintenance. The South Cañon toll was $.25. The land would be offered for public use for camping, hiking, horseback riding, and lodging in cottages. (Note: Any monies remaining after construction and operating costs had been covered would go to the Colorado College library and natural history cabinet, both of which were open to the public.) Three months later, The Gazette published the article "Our Cañons" condemning charging tolls to enter the Cheyenne Cañons, because there would be some people who would be then unable to enjoy the scenery and the cooler temperatures during the summer. Having to pay tolls can also leave a bad impression on visitors to the area. The author ask for county and city officials to purchase the property.

By 1898, several people lived and operated photography, burro line, and curio shop businesses in South Cheyenne Cañon. (Note: Fannie Havis operated a curio shop, J.M. Havis was a photographer, Coombs, Allen & Company operated a burro carriage line, and there were several residents in South Cheyenne Cañon in 1898.) Stratton Park (first called Cheyenne Park) was opened in 1902 at the intersection of North and South Cheyenne Cañon, covering part of both cañons. A burro stand operated in the park.

The tall Cañon walls near Seven Falls were more than 200 feet (61 m) high and made of multi-colored granite. Pillars of Hercules is a canyon wall more than 1,000 feet (300 m) tall. In 1906, Lilian Whiting, wrote that "the bridle paths, the terraced drives on the mountain walls, and the glades where games may be placed, all make South Cheyenne the most unique pleasure resort" of the country. South Cheyenne Cañon and North Cheyenne Cañons, green with trees, met at a place called Fair View in 1906.

Travelers could visit the Cañon by 1902 by taking the Colorado Springs and Interurban Railway electric trolley or via the carriage road. Buses replaced trolleys beginning in 1931 and the last electric trolley ran on April 30, 1932.

In September 2013, there was a significant flood which caused significant sediment and debris to result in the closing of South Cheyenne Canon Road. Due to damage it sustained, Seven Falls was closed until Spring 2015.

== Seven Falls ==
Seven Falls was closed in 2013 due to flooding. It was purchased in the Spring of 2014 by The Broadmoor resort and it reopened in the Summer of 2015.

== Trails ==
There are two hiking trails that begin at the top of Seven Falls. They are open from May through October until 7 pm. The Inspiration Point trail is a 1 mile (1.6 km) winding trail to Inspiration Point and takes about one hour round trip. There are views of the city of Colorado Springs and the plains. This was a favored spot by Helen Hunt Jackson that inspired her poem writing. As she wished, she was originally buried at the point. A shorter trail to Midnight Falls is about a half-hour hike to Midnight Falls, near the South Cheyenne Creek headwaters.

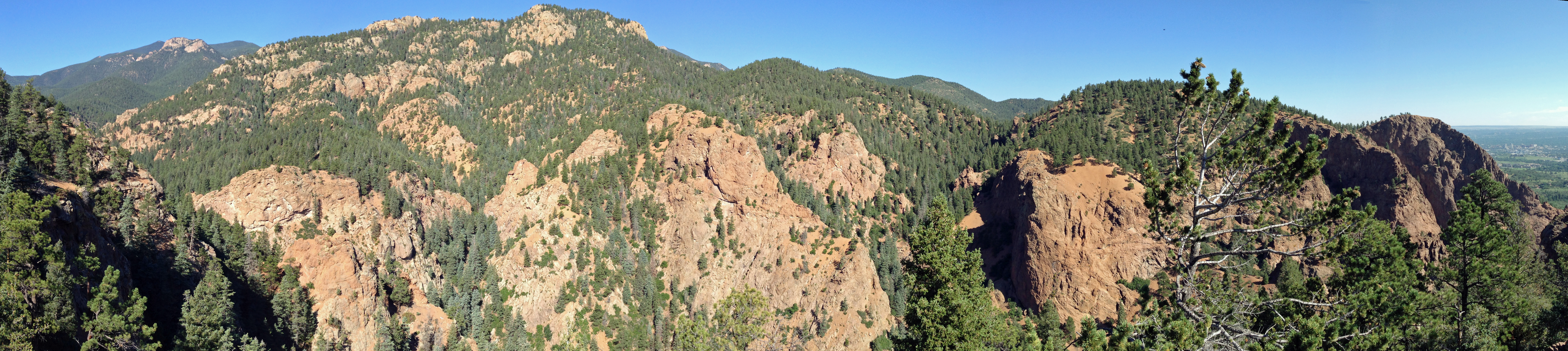
Inspiration Point, Colorado Springs

== Starsmore Visitor and Nature Center ==
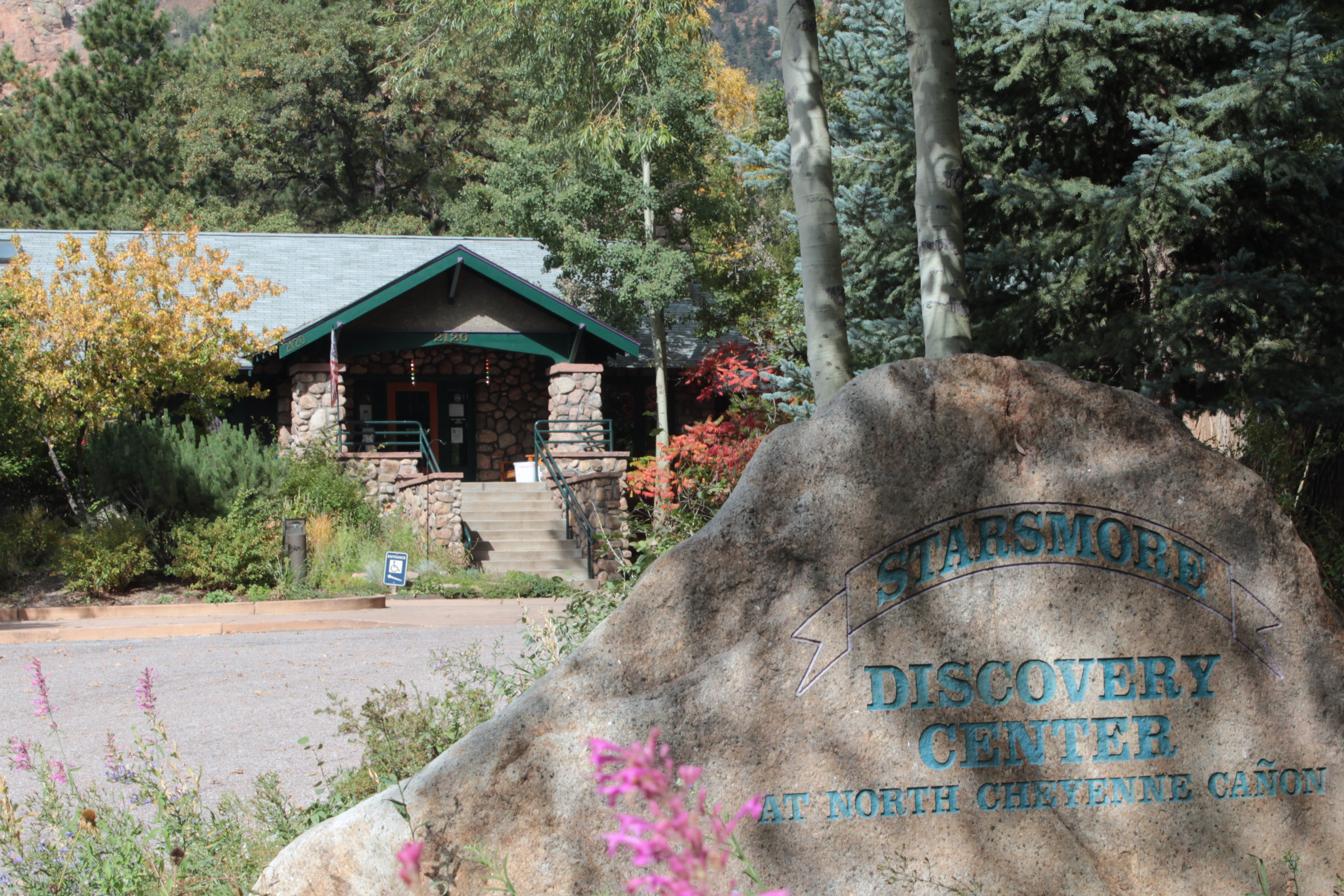
Starsmore Discovery Center

The Starsmore Visitor Nature Center is located on South Cheyenne Canyon Road at the entrance to North Cheyenne Cañon Park. This is roughly one mile east of the entrance to Seven Falls. It is the visitor center for the North Cheyenne Cañon Park that has hands-on exhibits, nature programs, and information about the park. North Cheyenne Canon Park and the Starsmore Visitor and Nature Center are free to the public. The park is open year-round and Starsmore is open from April to October.

== Recreation ==
There are picnic areas along South Cheyenne Cañon, including the Cheyenne Cañon Mesa facility that accommodates up to 100 people. It has hiking trails and a shelter. There are also picnic sites in the South Cañon Picnic Area along South Cheyenne Creek in the North Cheyenne Cañon Park. Picnicking is not allowed in the Seven Falls property.

== See also ==
- Cheyenne Creek
- Cheyenne Mountain
- North Cheyenne Cañon Park
