= Silver Cascade Falls (Colorado Springs, Colorado) =

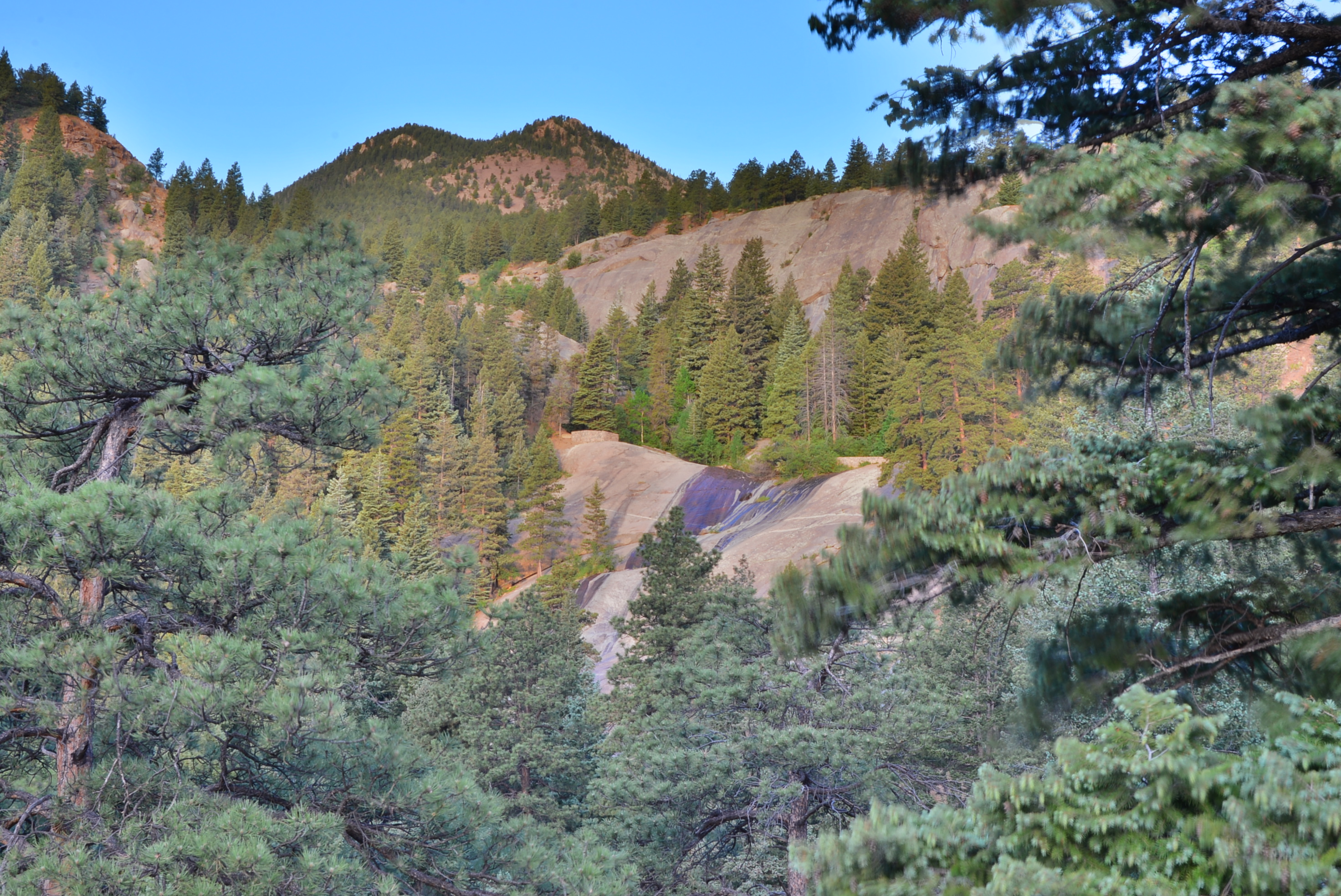
- Silver Cascade Falls, June '13

- Location within Colorado
- Location: North Cheyenne Cañon Park, Colorado Springs, Colorado, United States
- Coordinates: 38°47′12″N 104°54′23″W
- Type: Single / Fan
- Total height: 200 feet (61 m)
- Number of drops: 1
- Longest drop: 200 feet (61 m)
- Watercourse: Buffalo Canyon Creek

Silver Cascade Falls is a waterfall located on St. Mary's Creek in the North Cheyenne Cañon Park of Colorado Springs, Colorado.

The falls have an interesting spout feature about 50 feet (15 m) below the crest due to an upturn in the rock face. During high flow times, the spout can shoot water over 10 feet (3 m) off the rock face. The water running over Silver Cascade originates in Buffalo Canyon, passing over St. Mary's Falls and Silver Cascade Falls before merging with North Cheyenne Creek down stream of Helen Hunt Falls.

== Accessibility ==
Silver Cascade Falls can be reached by hiking a short but steep trail up from North Cheyenne Canyon road at the Helen Hunt Falls trail head. The trail is less than 0.5 miles (0.80 km), but steep in places and the footing can be slippery, especially when wet or when frozen over during the winter months. Care should be taken especially at the top of the falls, as the granite face of the falls is polished, slippery, and much steeper than it appears.

== Images ==
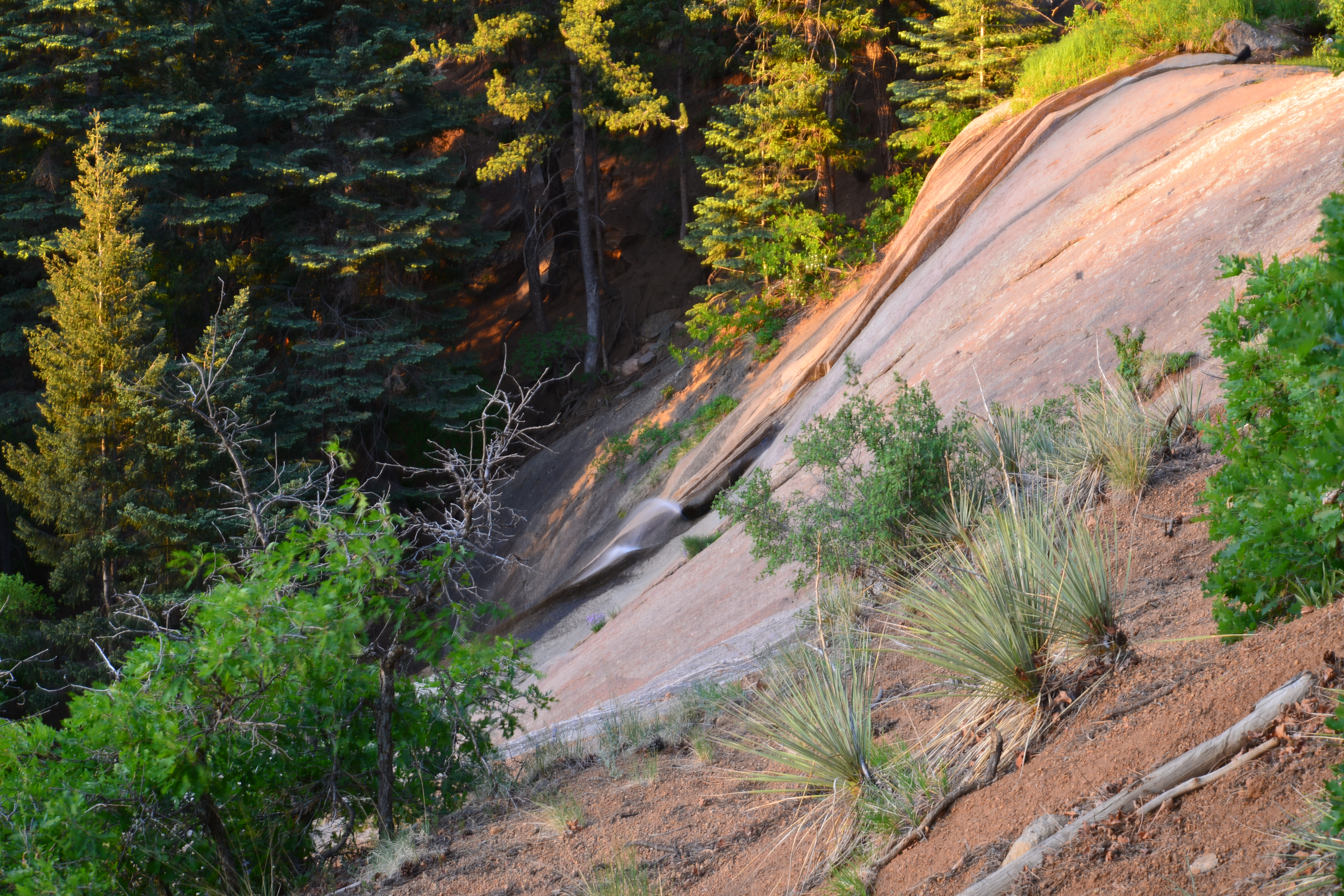
Spout on Silver Cascade Falls, June 2013

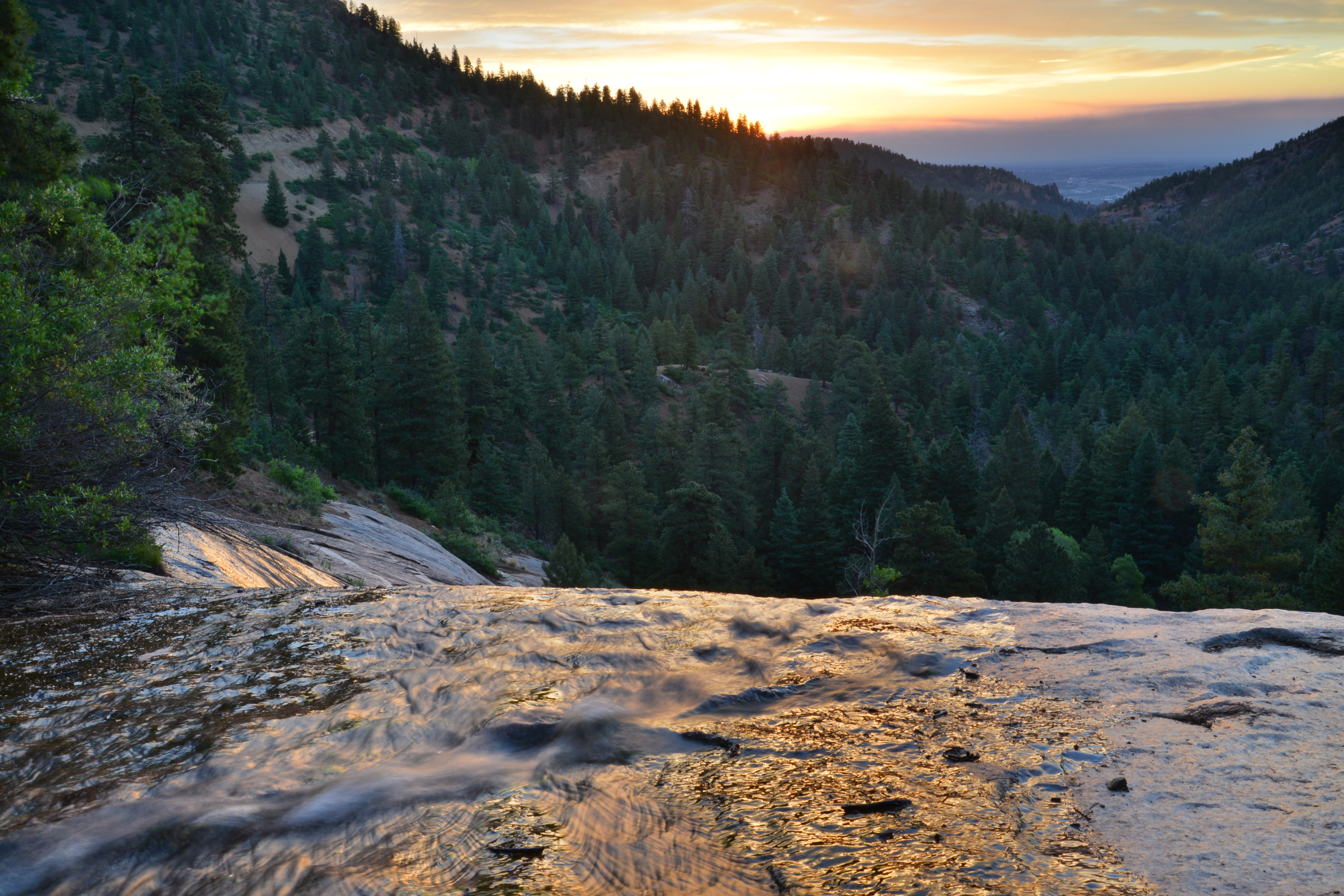
The crest of Silver Cascade Falls at dawn, June 2013

== See also ==
- List of waterfalls
- List of waterfalls in Colorado

== See also ==
- Waterfalls of Colorado
