= Stratton Park (Colorado) =

Former public park in Colorado Springs

External image
- Stratton Park images, Denver Public Library

Stratton Park, first called Cheyenne Park, was a Colorado Springs, Colorado park developed by Winfield Scott Stratton to serve local residents and tourists, particularly those who traveled the Colorado Springs and Interurban Railway street cars to Cheyenne canyon. Attractions on the line included Seven Falls, The Broadmoor and Cheyenne Mountain Zoo.

Stratton, president of the railroad, bought the land in 1900 and donated 20 acres for the park he named Cheyenne Park. He oversaw the construction of bridges, rock walls for Cheyenne Creek, and footpaths along what had been land of hills, wildflowers, and wildlife. It was 4.5 miles (7.2 km) from the end of the Cheyenne Canyon line. Construction was completed for a bandstand and a building of refreshment stands and waiting rooms.

The park was dedicated on June 6, 1901, during which John Philip Sousa and his band played for 4,000 attendees. When the park was completed in 1902 it had ponds for swimming and fishing, gardens, and picnic pavilions. Other recreational facilities included a baseball field, a shuffleboard court, rides for children and adults, and a dance pavilion.

After Stratton died in 1902, it was named Stratton Park. Up to 10,000 people visited the park during the summer weekends. On Sundays in the summer, the Colorado Midway Band played for the audience at the bandstand.

In 1932 part of the park was sold to Pierce Hampe for real estate development and ten acres was sold for the construction of the Colorado P.E.O. Sisterhood Chapter House.
