= Ivywild, Colorado =

Ivywild
- Neighborhood
- Ivywild on a map of Colorado
- Coordinates: 38°48′38″N 104°50′07″W
- Country: United States
- State: Colorado
- Municipality: Colorado Springs
- Established: 1888
- Founder: William B. Jenkins
- Elevation: 6,014 ft (1,833 m)
- Time zone: UTC−7 (MST)
  - Summer (DST): UTC−6 (MDT)
- Zip code: 80905
- Area code: 719
- GNIS feature ID: 193515

Ivywild, Colorado, is a subdivision of Colorado Springs south of the downtown, west of Cascade Avenue and along Cheyenne Creek.

== Early history ==
Before Europeans settled in the area, Cheyenne set up tepees at the confluence of the Fountain and Cheyenne Creeks when they traveled through the area. About 1859, Irving Howbert and his family settled near the creeks. The following year, John Wolfe settled along Cheyenne Creek. The area was called Ivywild by 1879.

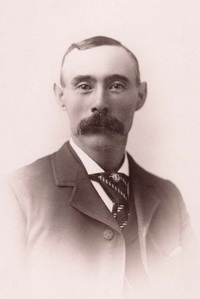
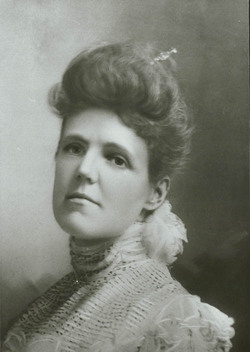
William B. Jenkins (1848-1917)	Anne Maria Iles Jenkins (1861-1940)

Ivywild was established in 1888 and platted by William B. Jenkins, a rancher and miner, who created 43 lots when he subdivided his ranch. His wife Annie named the town. She was a large stockholder of Ramona Mining Company. Her father, William Iles, was the Manager of Manitou Springs' first hotel, La Font. Ivywild had a post office by January 1892.

The Ivywild Improvement Society held annual meetings by 1898, when they discussed the high water rates and taxes. (Note: In 1914, The Gazette reported that an improvement society was to be created for Ivywild to be properly prepared to manage a fire. The Gazette reported in 2007 that the Ivywild Improvement Society was founded in 1915.) The organization filed suits in 1917 regarding public utility service to the community. Dorchester Park was named for Joseph Dorr, a water rights attorney, who established water rights for Cheyenne Canon and Ivywild. The Iowa native operated a hay farm after having settled in the area in 1874. The park is located across the creek from the site of Dorr's farm.

John H. Bacon, a mayor of Colorado Springs in 1880, lived in Ivywild by 1900. (Note: Bacon committed suicide at his Ivywild house in January 1904 at 70 years of age. He had been suffering from poor physical and mental health.)

== Early 20th century ==
The Ivywild Elementary School was founded in 1901 with two bungalow buildings until 1916 when a brick building was constructed. The two bungalows were moved, one became the Edelweiss Restaurant and the other the Ivywild Presbyterian Church.

In 1902, Winfield Scott Stratton (1848-1902) and Thomas F. Burns purchased 10 acres along Cheyenne Boulevard from William B. Jenkins for $16,000 (equivalent to $595,385 in 2025). The equal partners purchased the land for the construction of baseball park called Boulevard Park, just west of Jenkins Pond (now Tejon Street and Cheyenne Boulevard). The baseball park was built by Statton, but not completed until after his death. The Burns brothers (James and Thomas Burns) bought The Millionaires baseball club, and Thomas F. Burns was president of the club. The Colorado Springs Millionaires baseball team played at the park, often known as Base Ball Park, that sat 3,500 people. Boulevard Park, on the Colorado Springs and Interurban Railway's electric trolley route, was about a 5-minute trolley ride from the center of town.

Residents of Ivywild met at Jenkins' house on South Nevada Avenue to discuss the creation of a local government in 1902, when the community was governed by El Paso County, Colorado. It was reported that the time was right because "the growth of the pretty suburb has been steady." Plans were made later that year to begin to incorporate the town.

John Coughlin, a ward boss from Chicago, bought property in 1903 to invest in Ivywild development. He donated a carriage with fire equipment to the town in 1904. Coughlin built an amusement park, Cheyenne Springs Park and Zoo, at Alsace Way and 8th Street in 1906 at the cost of $75,000 (equivalent to $2,687,500 in 2025). A play entitled, Ivywild: The True Story of John "Bathhouse" Coughlin has been written about the man.

Charles Maddocks, who built houses in Ivywild from wood salvaged from Nikola Tesla's laboratory, bought Boulevard Park in 1904 when the Millionaires dissolved. He built bungalows, including Sears and other mail order homes. The Ivywild Pharmacy and Ivywild Grocery and Market were both doing business by 1916.

== Annexation and current status ==
In 1960, Ivywild had 10,608 residents and was part of the 17,713 population of Cheyenne Mountain Division, was a census county division in El Paso County, Colorado. In 1977, residents voted not to create a village called Cheyenne Mountain by consolidating the towns of Broadmoor, Skyway, Cheyenne Canon, and Ivywild.

A General Assembly bill in 1978 proposed consolidation of the suburbs into Colorado Springs. Ivywild was one of five Colorado Springs suburbs annexed into Colorado Springs in 1980. The others were Broadmoor, Skyway, Cheyenne Canon, and Stratton Meadows. The annexation added 6.5 square miles (17 km^{2}) and 20,000 people to the city's total area and population. The Colorado Supreme Court upheld the annexation in 1982.

== Ivywild School mixed-use center ==
The Ivywild Elementary School and Ivywild Community Church closed in 2009. The former elementary school was made into a multi-use commercial and community center called Ivywild School in 2013. The remodeled 20,000 square feet (1,900 m^{2}) building has a delicatessen, brewery, pub, bakery, coffee shop, gift shop, and architectural office. The project was partially funded by the city under an urban renewal project.

== Park ==
Ivywild Park, located at Navajo and Dorchester, was dedicated in 2005. The funding for the only neighborhood park in Ivywild was provided by a federal grant.

== Notable people ==
- Jean Stafford, short story writer and novelist
