= Broadmoor, Colorado =

Neighborhood of Colorado Springs, Colorado, United States

- Colorado Springs neighborhood
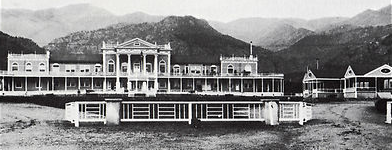
- Broadmoor Casino, with Broadmoor house on the right, in 1891.

- Location of Broadmoor, Colorado Springs, Colorado. Broadmoor (Colorado)
- Coordinates: 38.7955°N 104.8414°W
- Country: United States
- State: Colorado
- County: El Paso
- City: Colorado Springs
- Elevation: 6,162 ft (1,878 m)
- Time zone: UTC−07:00 (MST)
  - Summer (DST): UTC−06:00 (MDT)
- ZIP code: 80906
- Area code: 719
- GNIS neighborhood ID: 193527
- GNIS city ID: 2410198
- FIPS code: 08-16000

Broadmoor is a neighborhood of the City of Colorado Springs in El Paso County, Colorado, United States.

== Geography ==
Broadmoor was defined in 1901 as a plain in Colorado Springs.

The neighborhood extends beyond the plain along the northern spur of the Cheyenne Mountain massif and into the valley of Cheyenne Creek, which has its source at the adjacent North Cheyenne Cañon Park's confluence of South Cheyenne Creek and North Cheyenne Creek.

Adjacent neighborhoods are Upper and Lower Skyway (north), Ivywild (northeast), Stratton Meadows (east), and Neal Ranch (south).

== History ==
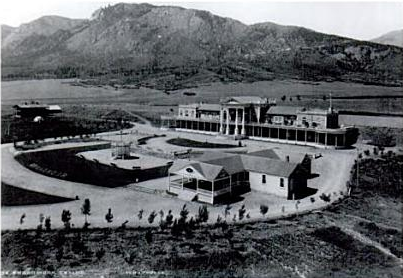
Broadmoor Casino, 1891

In the 1880s, Willie Wilcox and James Pourtales purchased the Broadmoor Dairy. Wilcox was a wealthy man who came to Colorado for his health and Pourtales was a Prussian Count. They dammed part of Cheyenne Creek that ran through the dairy's property to create a man-made lake to make a more enticing environment for a hotel and casino that they were building. The city of Colorado Springs, in an effort to supplement the water needed to be supplied for the town, "continued to steal water". In a legal suit, Wilcox and Pourtales were deemed the water rights holder. Their company went bankrupt and was reorganized as the Broadmoor Land and Investment Company. The London and New York Investment Company bought their organization in 1893 and in 1897 completed the construction of the lake and casino, which was formally landscaped, had grounds for polo and golf games, pigeon shooting, and gambling. The resort and casino were fashioned for wealthy guests and the buildings had European architecture. The Broadmoor Dairy was owned by Dr. Robert M. Smith in 1898.

In 1898, Broadmoor was 1 mile (1.6 km) southwest of the city limit and was about 2 miles (3.2 km) long. Piedmont was south of the east end of Broadmoor. The Broadmoor Casino and the Cheyenne Mountain Country Club were on the Colorado Springs and Interurban Railway Cheyenne Canon street car line in 1898.

In 1916, Broadmoor was described as fashionable suburb with many beautiful mansions on Cheyenne Road between Lake and Circle. Colorado Springs Gun Club had several locations, one of which was in Broadmoor at 7th and Vine. The Myron Stratton Home was in Broadmoor in 1916. The Broadmoor resort had an electric light plant and greenhouse on Lake Circle.

The Broadmoor, including its Broadmoor Golf Club, opened in 1918. In 1919, aircraft flights began to and from the hotel's neighboring fields.

Broadmoor was one of five Colorado Springs suburbs annexed into Colorado Springs in 1980. The others were Ivywild, Skyway, Cheyenne Canon, and Stratton Meadows. The annexation added 6.5 square miles (17 km^{2}) and 20,000 people to the city's total area and population. The Colorado Supreme Court upheld the annexation in 1982.

== See also ==
- Colorado Springs, CO Metropolitan Statistical Area
- Front Range Urban Corridor
- List of populated places in Colorado
