= Cheyenne Mountain State Park =

State park in El Paso County, Colorado

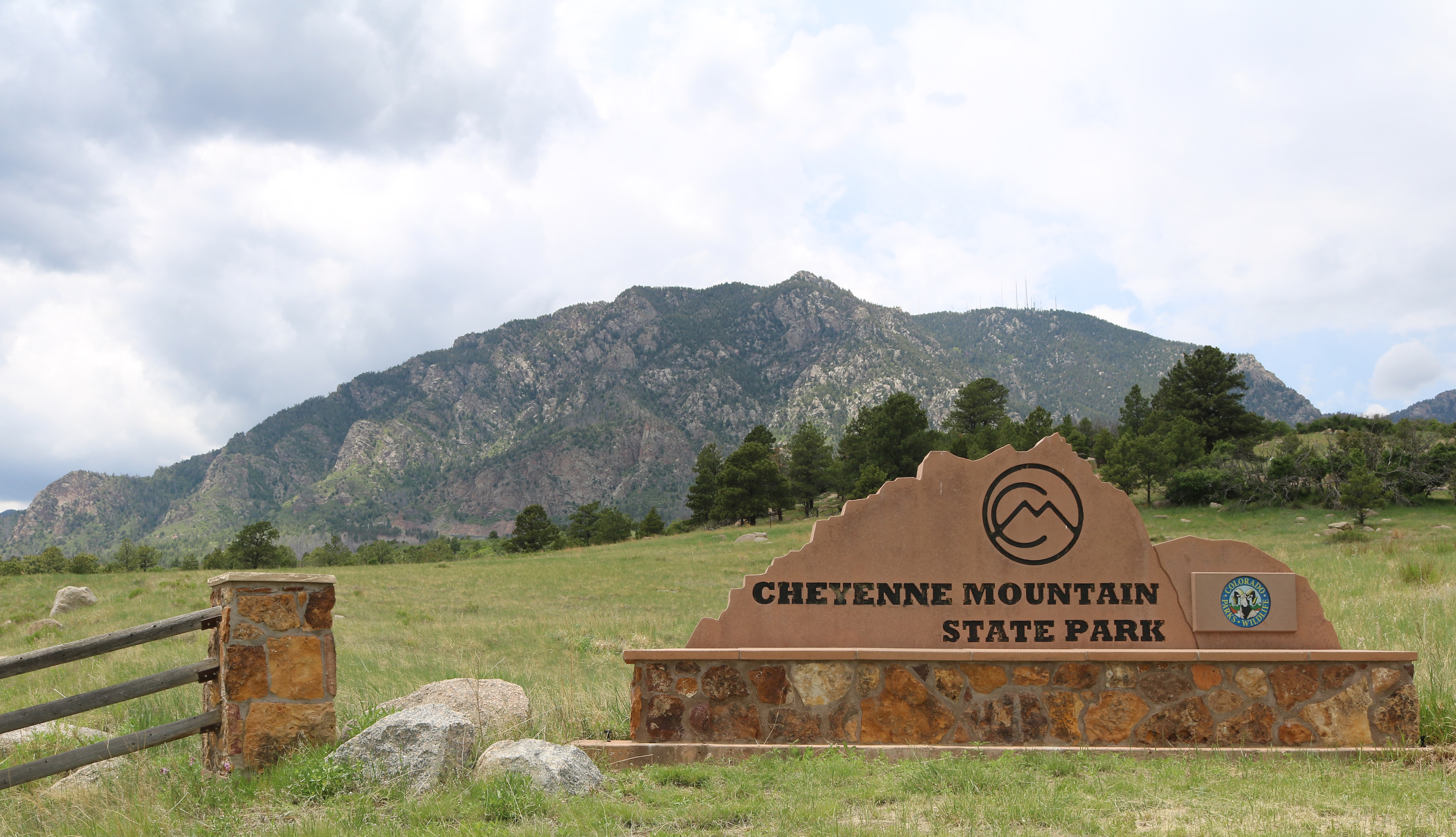
- The park's entrance sign and Cheyenne Mountain.

- Location within Colorado
- Location: El Paso County, Colorado, United States
- Nearest city: Colorado Springs
- Coordinates: 38°44′01″N 104°49′40″W
- Area: 1,680 acres (6.8 km^{2})
- Established: 2006
- Visitors: 262,456 (in 2021)
- Governing body: Colorado State Parks

Cheyenne Mountain State Park is a Colorado state park that was acquired in June 2000 through a partnership between the City of Colorado Springs, Colorado State Parks, Great Outdoors Colorado (GOCO), Colorado Lottery, El Paso County, and other local private organizations.

== History ==
In 1917, 800 acres on Cheyenne Mountain was homesteaded by Bert Swisher and Thomas Dixon, both of whom applied for the homestead that year. The actual grants for the property, now part of the Cheyenne State Park, were granted to Bert Swisher and Thomas Dixon between 1922 and 1926. Dixon resided with his family in a cabin near the top of the mountain in the middle of three valleys. Swisher's cabin was near the present site of the antenna farm at the top of the mountain, which was accessed by Old Stage Road. The Dixon property was purchased by Swisher's grandchildren in 1988 through the Cheyenne Mountain Reserve, LLC.

Formerly the JL Ranch, the park is situated just south of Colorado Springs and represents the protection of one of the last significant open spaces along the southern section of the Colorado Front Range. The 2,701-acre (10.93 km^{2}) park lies beneath the eastern flank of Cheyenne Mountain, and borders the plains of Colorado in a stunning transition from plains to peaks. The land is in remarkable natural condition, and wildlife is abundant as well as diverse due to the property's relatively undisturbed and unfragmented nature. Wildlife in the park includes deer, elk, black bears, cougar, coyotes, foxes, prairie dogs, red-tailed hawks, golden eagles and wild turkeys.

The park opened in October 2006 and is the only state park located in El Paso County. There are 28 miles (45 km) of trails throughout the park which are open to hikers and bikers. Dogs and horses are not permitted on the trails in order to keep the surrounding ecosystems intact and to avoid disturbing the ground-nesting birds that reside in the park.

Cheyenne Mountain also has day-use picnic sites and a visitor center where educational displays and interpretive programs are available for visitors. Evening programs and nature hikes are available during the spring and summer months and periodically during the fall and winter months. The park is open for day use, camping with full hookup and walk-in camping sites, and a camper services building.

== Sources ==
- "Cheyenne Mountain State Park". Colorado State Parks. Archived from the original on December 10, 2007.
