= St. Peter's Dome =

Peak in Colorado, United States

Coordinates: 38°44′50.4″N 104°54′41.5″W

St. Peter's Dome is a granite-topped peak on Pikes Peak massif in the Pike National Forest. The peak, at 9,528 feet (2,904 m) in elevation, is located in El Paso County, Colorado, above Colorado Springs. It is located about 8 miles (13 km) from Colorado Springs along Old Stage and Gold Camp Roads. Old Stage Road is picked up behind The Broadmoor and Gold Camp Road winds through Cheyenne Canyon.

The St. Peter's Dome mining district, also called the Cheyenne District, has been operational since 1910. In the early 20th century, trains stopped at the St. Peter's Dome for the trip between Cripple Creek and Colorado Springs. Tourists had picnics, hiked, and camped in the area.

== Recreation ==
St. Peter's Dome can be climbed via a 2 miles (3.2 km) trail with a 400 feet (120 m) gain in altitude. The trail heads northwest from the parking lot by the sign for the St. Peter's Dome Shooting Range. One section of the trail is a vertical ascent that requires use of the knotted rope to climb 10 feet (3.0 m). From the ledge above, the trail continues to the summit where there is a view of the city of Colorado Springs and Cheyenne Mountain. It is not recommended for small children and dogs.

There is rock climbing on nearby formations, such as the Aiguille de St. Peter formation.

== History ==
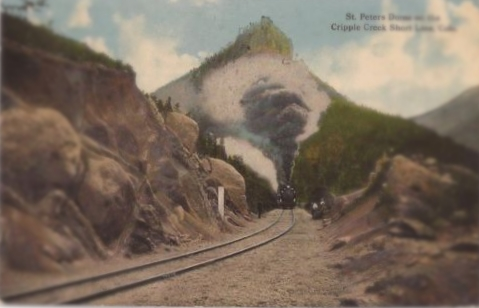
St. Peter's Dome and Colorado Springs and Cripple Creek District Railway 1910s

In the early 20th century, the Colorado Springs and Cripple Creek District Railway (Short Line) passed from Cripple Creek through St. Peter's Dome to Colorado Springs. In 1902, about 200,000 people took the train along the rim of South Cheyenne Cañon to Colorado Springs. It was a picnic and camping site. The vertical ascent of 10 feet (3.0 m) was first made by a wooden ladder and then a spiral staircase. It is now made by using a knotted rope.

There was also a trail for burro and pony rides to St. Peter's Dome.

== St. Peter's Dome District ==
First called Cheyenne District, the mining district of St. Peter's Dome, Stove Mountain, and Sugarloaf Mountain is more commonly known as St. Peter's Dome District. The latitude and longitude of the district are that of St. Peter's Dome. The district is at the sources of South Cheyenne Creek, Rock Creek and Little Fountain Creek. Mines include the Timberline, Mattie B., Eureka, and Duffields fluorspar mines. Others are the Trail Mines Prospect and St. Peter's Dome No. 1. The mines primarily produced fluorine-fluorite, gold, silver, lead, and zinc. To a lesser degree, the following have been found include thorium, REE, gemstone, uranium, beryllium, titanium, tin, and niobium. Cryolite was discovered there by October 1882. Ore or minerals were discovered in 1901. Mining began in 1910 and Kramer Mines purchased the mines in 1945.
