= Cheyenne Creek =

Stream in Colorado Springs, Colorado, U.S.

Coordinates: 38°48′58″N 104°49′22″W

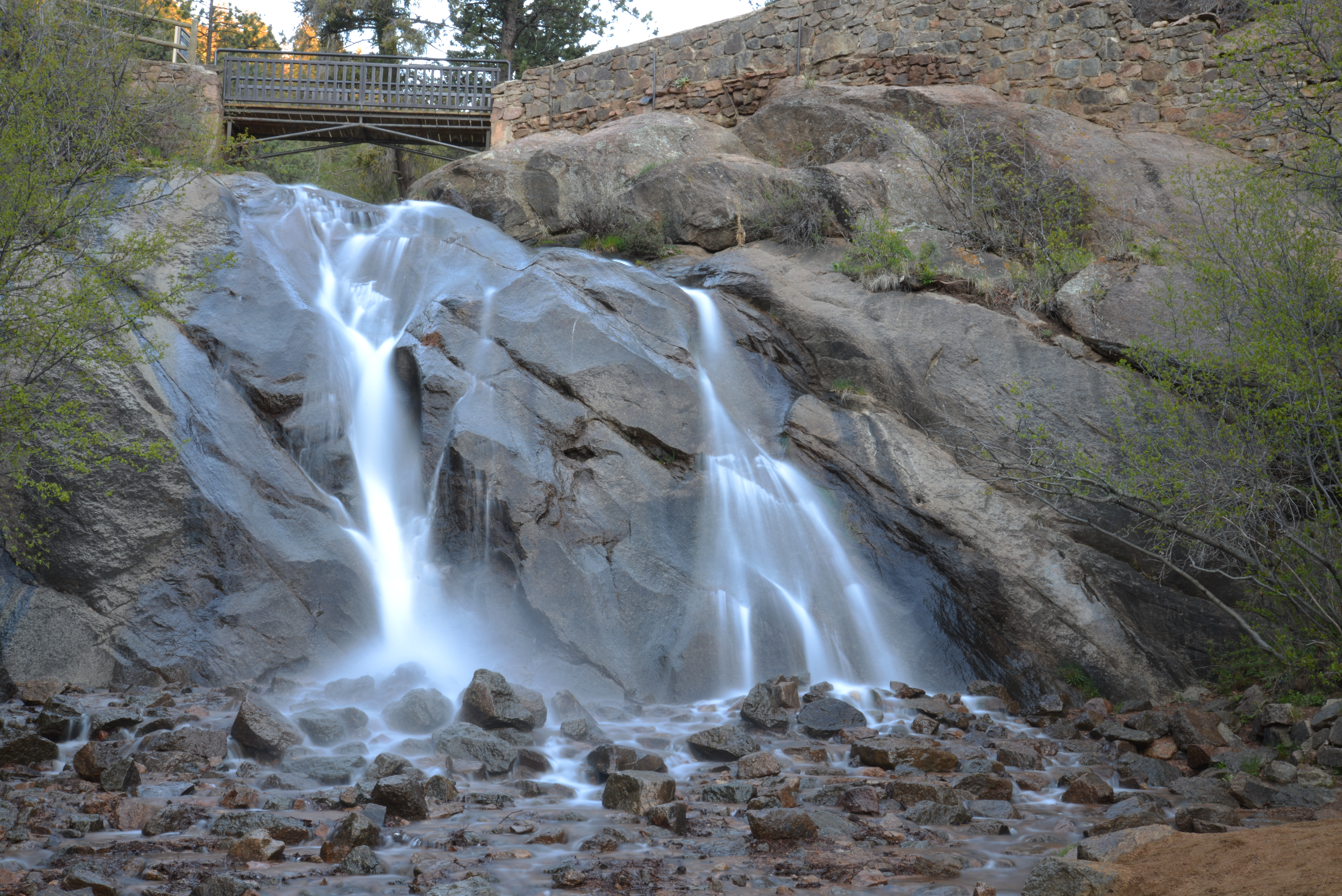
Helen Hunt Falls, through which Cheyenne Creek flows

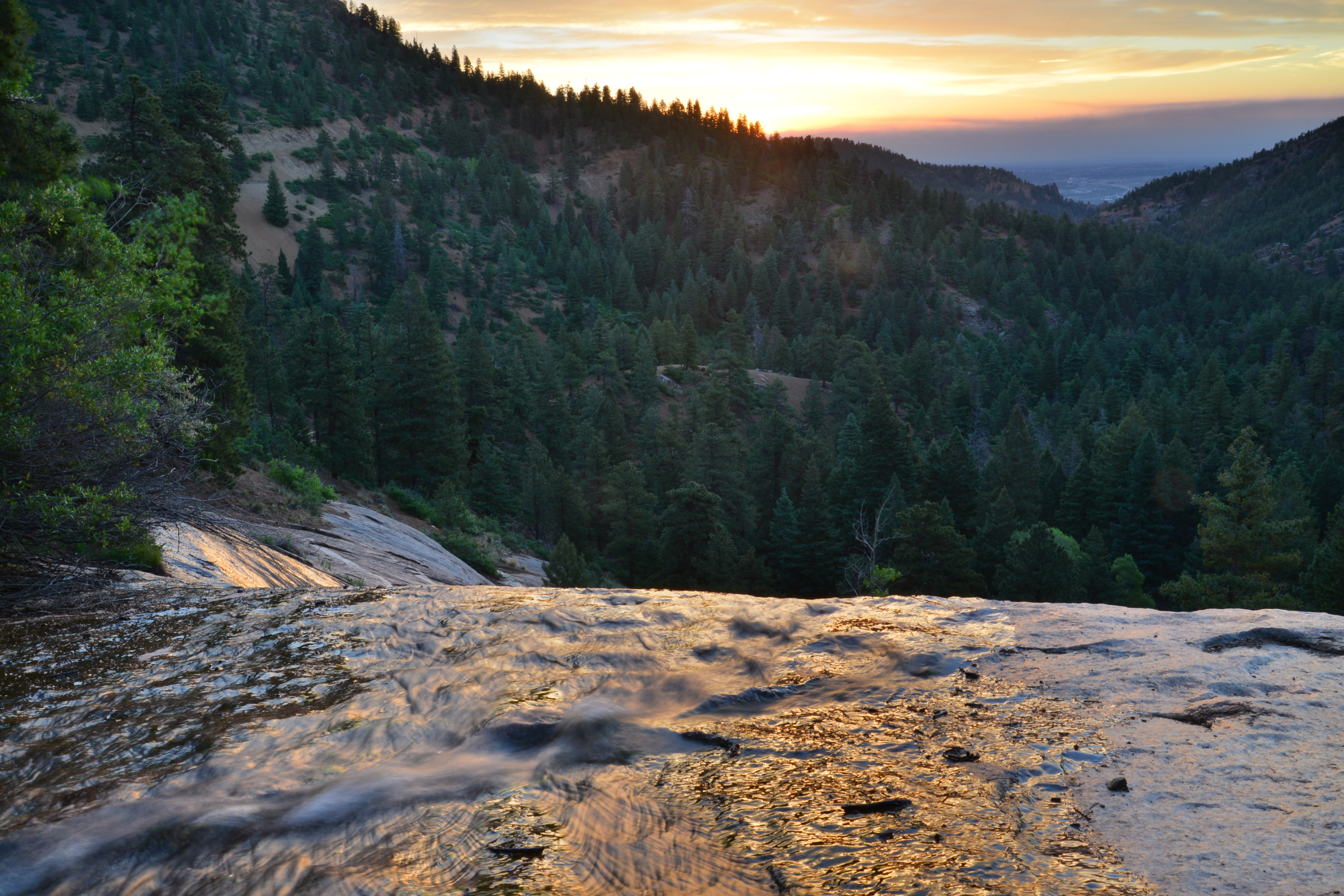
The crest of Silver Cascade Falls at dawn. The water running over Silver Cascade originates in Buffalo Canyon, passing over St. Mary's Falls and Silver Cascade Falls before merging with North Cheyenne Creek down stream of Helen Hunt Falls.

Cheyenne Creek is a stream in Colorado Springs, El Paso County, Colorado at 5,920 feet (1,800 m) in elevation. The stream is fed by the North Cheyenne Creek and South Cheyenne Creek and flows into Fountain Creek near Nevada Avenue, between Interstate 25 and the Pikes Peak Greenway trail. North Cheyenne Creek and South Cheyenne Creek flow through Teller and El Paso Counties. The source of South Cheyenne Creek is Mount Big Chief, near St. Peter's Dome, and it flows to Seven Falls.

== History ==
Before Europeans settled in the area, Cheyenne set up tepees at the confluence of the Fountain and Cheyenne Creeks when they traveled through the area. About 1859, Irving Howbert and his family settled near the creeks. The following year, John Wolfe settled along Cheyenne Creek.

In the 1880s, Willie Wilcox and James Purtales dammed part of Cheyenne Creek in Broadmoor that ran through their Broadmoor Dairy property to create a man-made lake to make a more enticing environment for a hotel and casino that they were building. The city of Colorado Springs, in an effort to supplement the water needed to be supplied for the town, "continued to steal water". Resolution of a legal suit deemed Wilcox and Purtales the water rights holders.

Ivywild was established in 1888 and platted by William B. Jenkins, along Cheyenne Creek. It is west of the current Cascade Avenue and south of downtown.

Winfield Scott Stratton, president of the Colorado Springs and Interurban Railway, bought the land in 1900 and donated 20 acres (8.1 ha) for the park he named Cheyenne Park (later Stratton Park). The park—that had bridges, rock walls for Cheyenne Creek, and footpaths along what had been land of hills, wildflowers, and wildlife—was on the Cheyenne Canyon trolley line. In 1932 part of the park was sold to real estate developer and 10 acres (4.0 ha) was sold for the construction of the Colorado P.E.O. Sisterhood Chapter House.

== Colorado Springs water supply ==
The South Suburban Water Company owned the land and water rights including North and South Cheyenne Creeks until 1966, when they were acquired by the city of Colorado Springs.

Cheyenne Creek is one of the many creeks that supplies water for the city of Colorado Springs. North and South Cheyenne Creeks flow into reservoirs or downstream. North Cheyenne Creek water flows into Gold Camp and South Suburban reservoirs. South Cheyenne Creek water flows into the South Suburban Pumping System and then either of the reservoirs or downstream. The reservoirs and pumping station are located near the confluence of the north and south streams into Cheyenne Creek, which ultimately flows into Fountain Creek. Water can be diverted by the pumping station to the Penrose Reservoir, which supplies the irrigation system at The Broadmoor.
