= Seven Falls =

Waterfall in Colorado, US

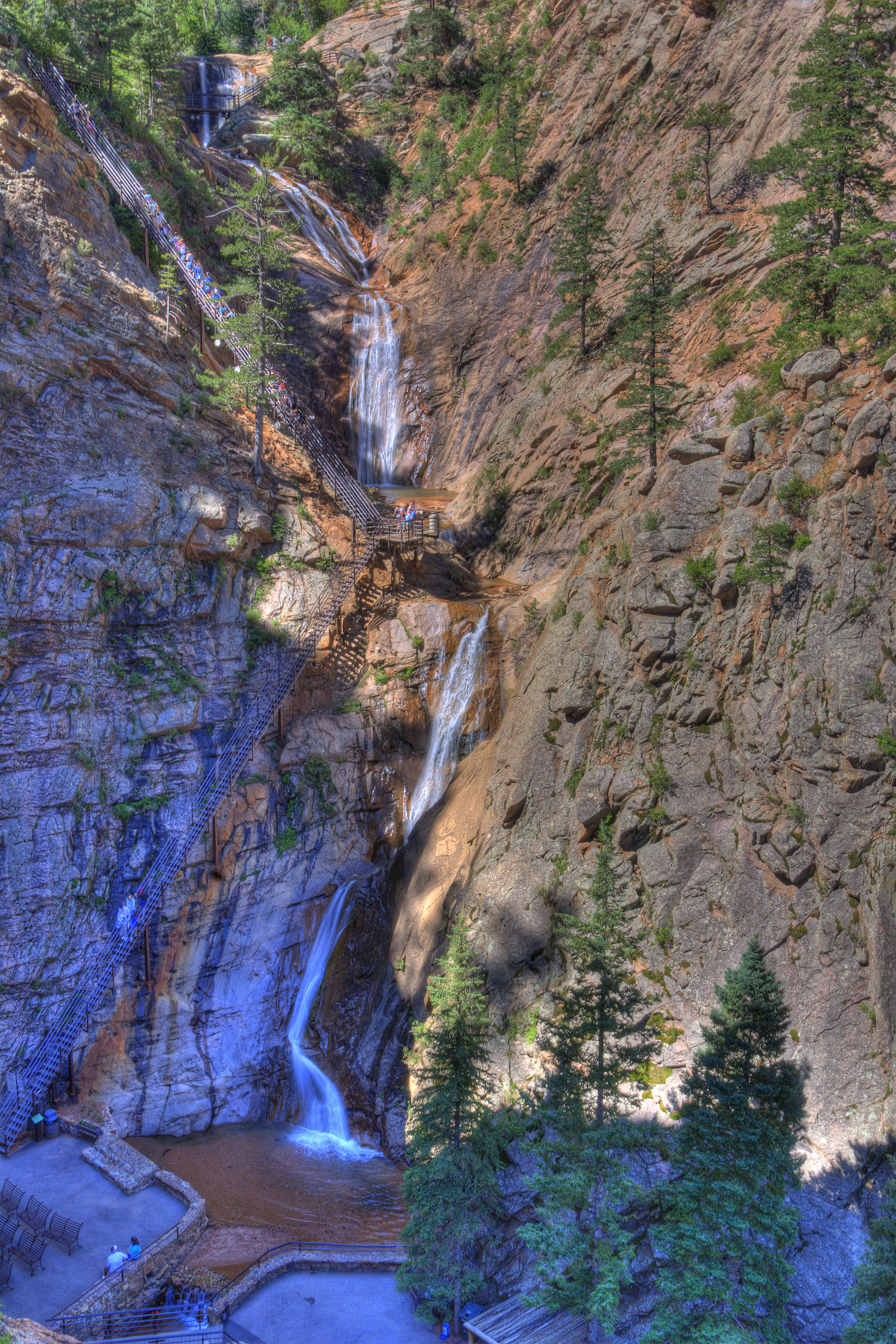
- Seven Falls

- Location within Colorado
- Coordinates: 38°46′44″N 104°52′48″W
- Total height: 181 feet (55 m)
- Number of drops: 224

Seven Falls is a series of seven cascading waterfalls of South Cheyenne Creek in South Cheyenne Cañon, Colorado Springs, Colorado, United States. It has been a privately owned tourist attraction since it was opened in the early 1880s. There is no parking at Seven Falls. Round trip shuttle service is provided from the Norris Penrose Event Center. Trails from the top of the falls lead to Midnight Falls, near the headwaters of South Cheyenne Creek, and Inspiration Point.

== Geography ==
Seven Falls is located in Colorado Springs along the Front Range. It is in a natural box canyon in South Cheyenne Cañon. The entrance to the canyon is about 4.5 miles (7.2 km) southwest of downtown Colorado Springs on Cheyenne Boulevard. The South Cheyenne Cañon road to Seven Falls has been called "The Grandest Mile of Scenery" in Colorado.

The falls are located in a 1,000-foot (300 m) granite canyon. Ponderosa pine, Douglas fir, juniper, and blue spruce are found in the Seven Falls park.

=== Falls ===
The sum of the height of the seven falls is 181 feet (55 m) and there are a total of 224 steps on the staircase from the base of the falls to the peak. There is a wheel-chair-accessible elevator that goes up to the Eagle's Nest observation platform with views of the falls.

The falls are named in alphabetical order (not top to bottom): Bridal Veil, Feather, Hill, Hull, Ramona, Shorty, and Weimer. Susan Joy Paul, author of Hiking Waterfalls in Colorado, describes it as "seven leaps of plunge, cascade, punchbowl, fan, and horsetail spray."

Seven Falls is Colorado's only waterfall that is included in the National Geographic list of international waterfalls. Local wildlife includes hummingbirds, the Water Ouzel or American Dipper songbird that swims, and Brook and Rainbow Trout.

=== Trails ===
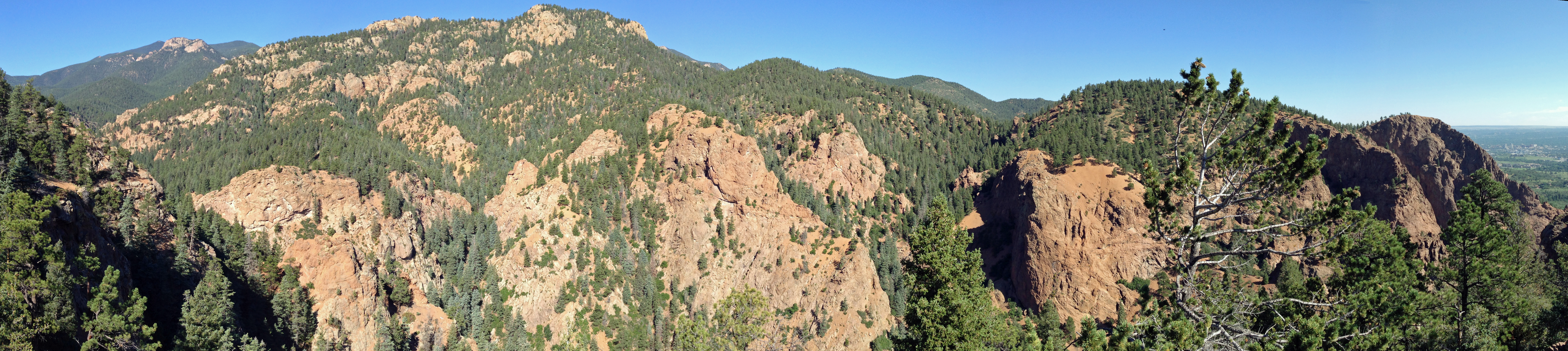
Inspiration Point, Colorado Springs

There are two hiking trails that begin at the top of Seven Falls. They are open from May through October until 7 p.m. The Inspiration Point trail is a 1-mile-long (1.6 km) winding trail to Inspiration Point and takes about one hour round trip. There are views of the city of Colorado Springs and the plains. This was a favored spot of Helen Hunt Jackson's that inspired her poetry. She was originally buried at the point.

A shorter trail is about a half-hour hike to Midnight Falls, near the South Cheyenne Creek headwaters. The trails begin at 6,800 feet (2,100 m) in elevation and end at about 7,200 feet (2,200 m) in elevation. No vehicle parking is available at the falls. Bicycle parking is available at the entrance.

=== Rock formations ===
Just inside the entrance to the Seven Falls property is the Pillars of Hercules, which are 900 feet (270 m) high from the floor of the canyon. Across from the Pillars of Hercules is the George Washington profile. At this point, the canyon walls are just 41 feet (12 m) apart.

== History ==
=== Late 19th century ===
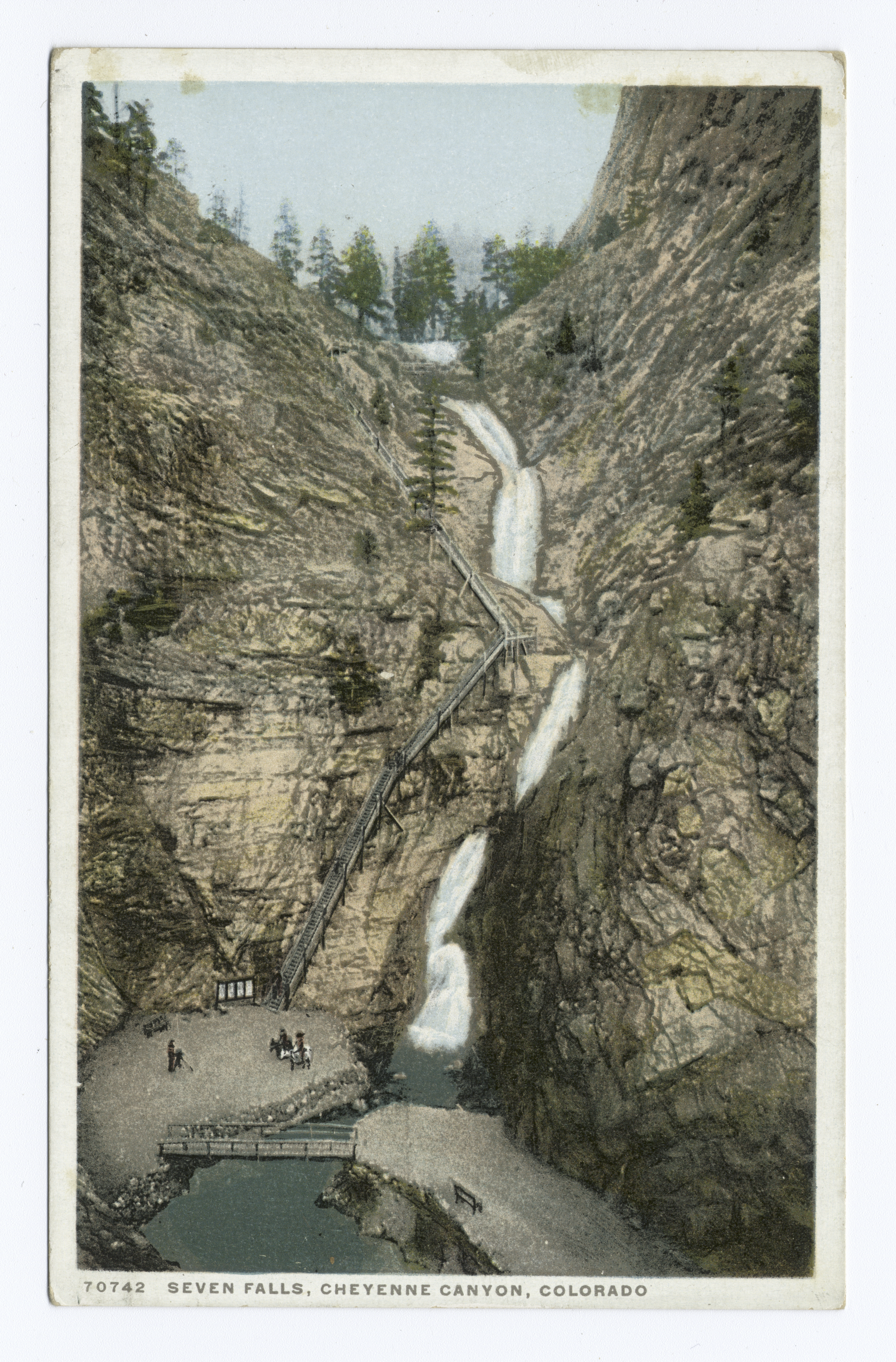

Nathaniel Colby homesteaded 160 acres (0.25 sq mi; 0.65 km^{2}) in South Cheyenne Canyon, including Seven Falls in December 1872. He sold the land rights nine months later for $1,000 (equivalent to $24,000 in 2024) to the Colorado Springs Land Company. In 1882, fearing logging operations would ruin the scenic area, naturalist James Hull purchased the property. The trail to Inspiration Point was launched in 1883. By 1885, he owned 400 acres (0.63 sq mi; 1.6 km^{2}) in the canyon. Hull built a stairway to the top of the falls and built a road through the canyon. Customers came by horses, burros, and carriages, and paid a toll to enter Seven Falls.

=== 20th century ===
After Hull's death in 1890, his sons owned the property, which was assessed by the county at $80,000 (equivalent to $2,500,000 in 2024) and estimated to be worth more than $200,000 (equivalent to $6,400,000 in 2024) by the local Gazette.

The property, now 1,400 acres (2.2 sq mi; 5.7 km^{2}) was bought for $250,000 (equivalent to $6,700,000 in 2024) by Callidore Dwight Weimer in 1905. Weimer, a successful mine owner and developer born in Ohio, had become a permanent resident of Colorado Springs in 1903. Melvin Weimer, and his wife Frances, co-managed the Seven Falls business. Frances was a longtime supporter of the Colorado Springs Fine Arts Center and manager of several family businesses in New Mexico and Colorado. It was sold to Al Hill, a Colorado College student and an oilman from Texas, in 1946. To extend business hours into the nighttime, Hill added lights in the canyon in 1947. The Hill family built the Eagle's Nest Observation platform, and cut 170 feet (52 m) into the side of the mountain for an elevator, which was updated in 1992. For Christmas in 1947, the canyon was opened at night for free to the people of Colorado Springs, allowing a charity to collect donations, an event that became an annual tradition.

The Seven Falls park was wiped out after a flood in 1965.

In December 2002, a dynamic Martin Architectural lighting system was installed which bathed the cascades in color. Seven Falls is still known as the only fully lit canyon in the world.

The area sustained a significant flood in September 2013, which forced Seven Falls to close until restoration was complete in 2015.

The cost has increased over the years. In 2023 the admission price was US$18 for adults, US$12 for age 2 to 12.

=== Broadmoor ===
Five days of heavy rains in mid-September 2013 caused similar damage to a significant flood in 1965. The worst-hit area of the city, the southwest side of Colorado Springs, received up to 12 inches (300 mm) of water. The large amount of water flowing over the falls resulted in five falls rather than seven. The Seven Falls park had downed trees, standing water, mud, and a damaged road. The park was closed and the incoming streets were blocked. In April 2014, it was announced that The Broadmoor had purchased Seven Falls, with plans to reopen the park in 2015. The property had been owned by the A.G. Hill family for 68 years.

The Broadmoor re-opened Seven Falls on August 13, 2015. The site now features remote parking at the hotel, with a shuttle bus to the canyon, freeing up vehicle congestion and parking issues that had been a problem in the past. The Broadmoor simultaneously opened Restaurant 1858, a fine dining establishment at the foot of the Falls.

== See also ==
- List of waterfalls
- List of waterfalls of Colorado
- North Cheyenne Cañon Park
