= Seven Lakes, Colorado =

Former populated place in Colorado, USA

Coordinates: 38°46′54″N 105°00′31″W

External images
- 1883 Railway map, that shows Seven Lakes and its hotel
- 1907 Seven Lakes
- Reservoirs 4 (Mason) & 5 (McReynolds)

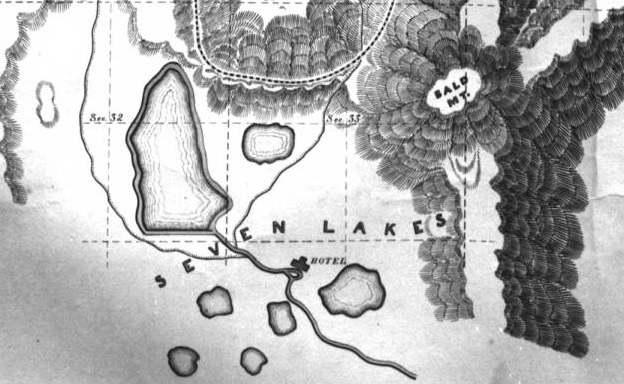
Seven Lakes and identification of the location of the hotel, sheltered by Mt. Baldy. Taken from a drawing of proposed Pikes Peak Railway made in 1883.

Seven Lakes is an abandoned, historically populated place in Teller County, Colorado, on the Pikes Peak mountain. It was once the site of the Seven Lakes Hotel along a carriage road to the summit of Pikes Peak. Its waters flow from Beaver Creek to the Lake Moraine reservoir, a supplier of water to Colorado Springs.

== History ==
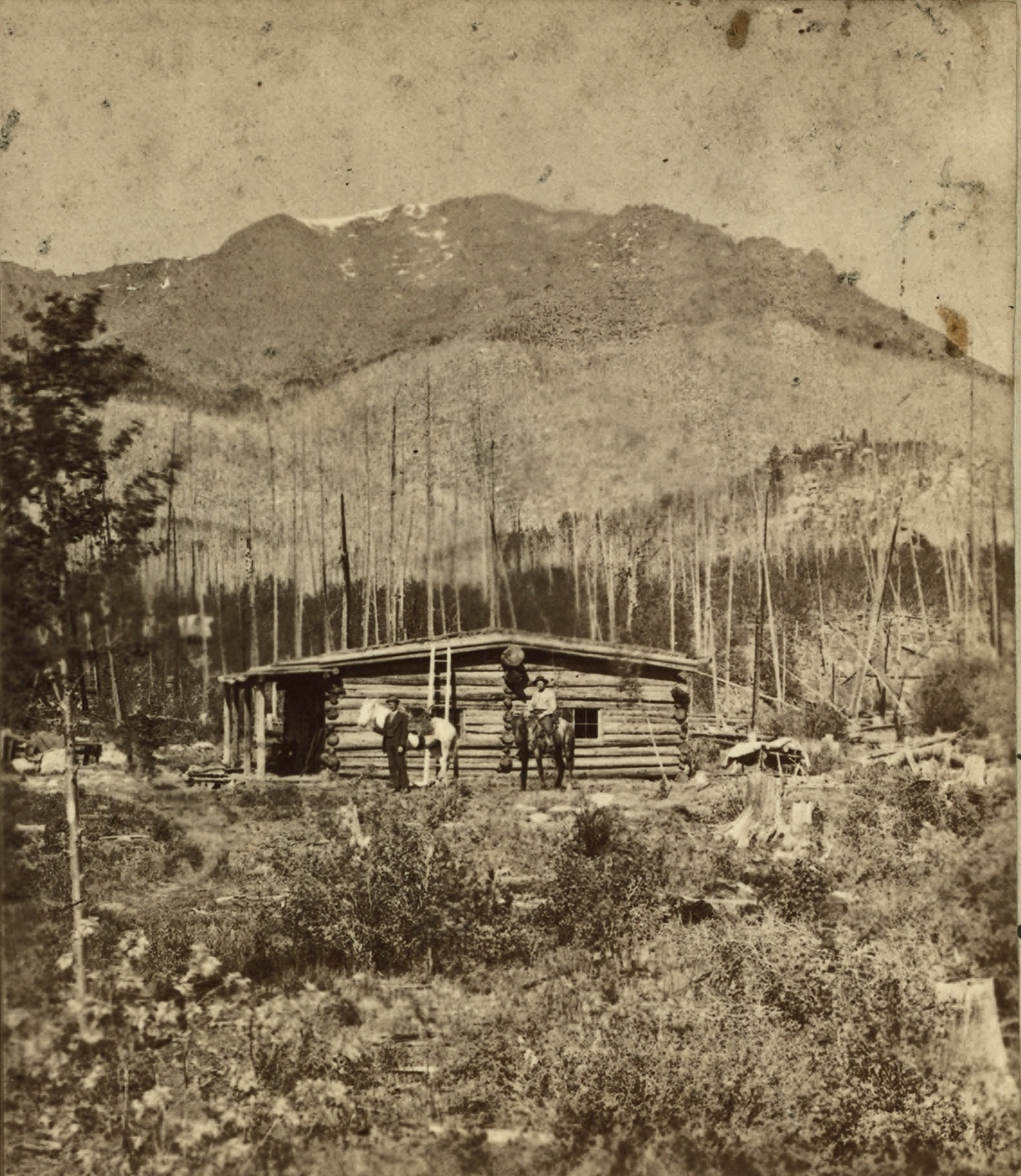
Seven Lakes cabin hotel and Pikes Peak, taken by Robert N. Dennis between 1865 and 1905.

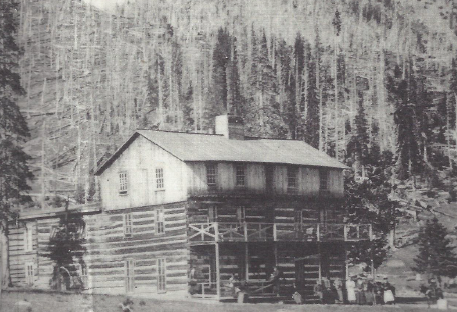
Seven Lakes Hotel, taken before it burned down in the 1880s

Seven Lakes Park was a horseshoe basin nearly enclosed by Bald Mountain's (generally now called Almagre Mountain) walls. In the late 1870s, a wagon road from Colorado City (now Old Colorado City) to Jones Park was extended to Seven Lakes. (Note: This may be the carriage road that began in Bear Creek and traversed through Jones Park to Seven Lakes.) From there, it was about a five-mile hike to the top of Pikes Peak. In 1889, the carriage road was completed from Seven Lakes to the Pikes Peak summit. Another route could be taken in 1904 on the Colorado Springs and Cripple Creek District Railway (Short Line) to the Clyde station. It was about 3.5 miles (5.6 km) via trails and the carriage road to Seven Lakes.

A one-story log cabin built about 1877 in a ravine at 11,000 feet (3,400 m) in elevation served as hotel. In 1880, Mayo G. Smith bought the Seven Lakes Park property and ran the hotel from 1882 to 1883. It was visited in 1887 by the Boyden Expedition of Harvard College, who took atmospheric measurements of Seven Lakes and Pikes Peak. The hotel was expanded to several stories and fitted with a billiard room and bowling alley, and burned down in the 1880s. Visitors came to the area to camp and fish. The Pike's Peak and Seven Lakes Toll Road Company was established by 1890.

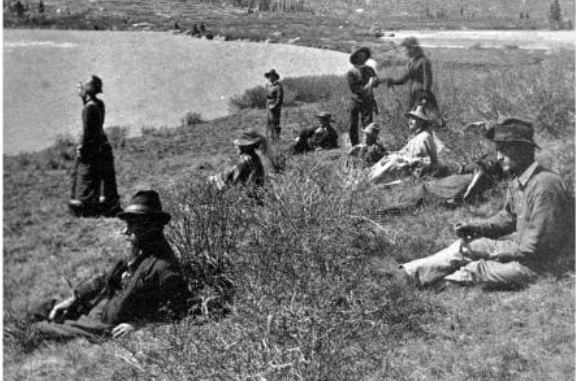
Tourists at Seven Lakes near Pikes Peak, taken about 1876 by L.K. Oldroyd

== Railway lines ==
In 1896, the Colorado Springs & Cripple Creek Short Line Company planned to build a railway branch through Seven Lakes to Pikes Peak. In 1909, the mode of transportation into Seven Lakes was via horses.

The Seven Lakes-Pike's Peak Railway Company was formed in the fall of 1901 to build an 11 miles (18 km) electric trolley line from Clyde to Pikes Peak through Seven Lakes. It was expected to be completed within a year at a cost of $250,000 (equivalent to $9,302,885 in 2025). Henry C. Hall was one of the company's railroad directors. Hall made a proposal during a citizens meeting in the Colorado Springs council chambers in August 1901 regarding water at Seven Lakes. He asked for a review of the use of Seven Falls as a source of water for the city. He claimed it would be an expensive investment but might not provide as much water as anticipated.

== Seven Lakes water supply ==
=== Background ===
The Seven Lakes water supply of one hundred or more acres consists of small bodies of water at 10,500 feet (3,200 m) in altitude which flow south into Beaver Creek and then Lake Moraine, a source of water for the city of Colorado Springs by 1899. (Note: Before Colorado Springs developed a water system, people obtained water from open ditches or wells, which became contaminated due to the porous, loose soil and residents became ill with typhoid fever. A gravity water system was built in 1878 to carry water from Pike Peak's Lake Moraine via Ruxton Creek.) The seven natural lakes formed by glaciers were: Isoetes Lake, Lake of the Rocks, Marsh Lake, Michigan Lake, Mirror Lake, Ramona Lake, and Ribbon Lake.

The city of Colorado Springs purchased Seven Lakes land for $70,000 in 1891. That year they built the Lake Moraine Dam. An injunction to prevent the City of Colorado Springs from paying for and receiving title to the Seven Lakes property was refused in January 1902.

=== Reservoirs built ===
In 1905, the Mason and McReynolds reservoirs were built in the Seven Lakes area. Marsh, Ribbon, and Mirror Lakes were used to make one of the reservoirs, and another reservoir was formed in the Seven Lakes area. Water from the two reservoirs flows through the St. John tunnel to Lake Moraine. (Note: The City Engineer, E. W. Case, completed surveys for the Seven Lakes reservoirs in 1902, and the St. John Tunnel for water was completed 1903-4 from the Seven Lakes' waterbody that would become "Reservoir 4" over the divide to Lake Moraine.) In 1909, the City of Colorado Springs restricted access to McReynolds and Mason Reservoirs (Seven Lakes), a source of the municipality's water, which closed off transportation opportunities through that area.

Closed since the 1900s, the two South Slope Recreation Area reservoirs were opened for fishing in 2014, subject to a reservation with the City of Colorado Springs and a Colorado fishing license.

== See also ==
- List of ghost towns in Colorado
