= North Cheyenne Cañon Park =

- U.S. National Register of Historic Places
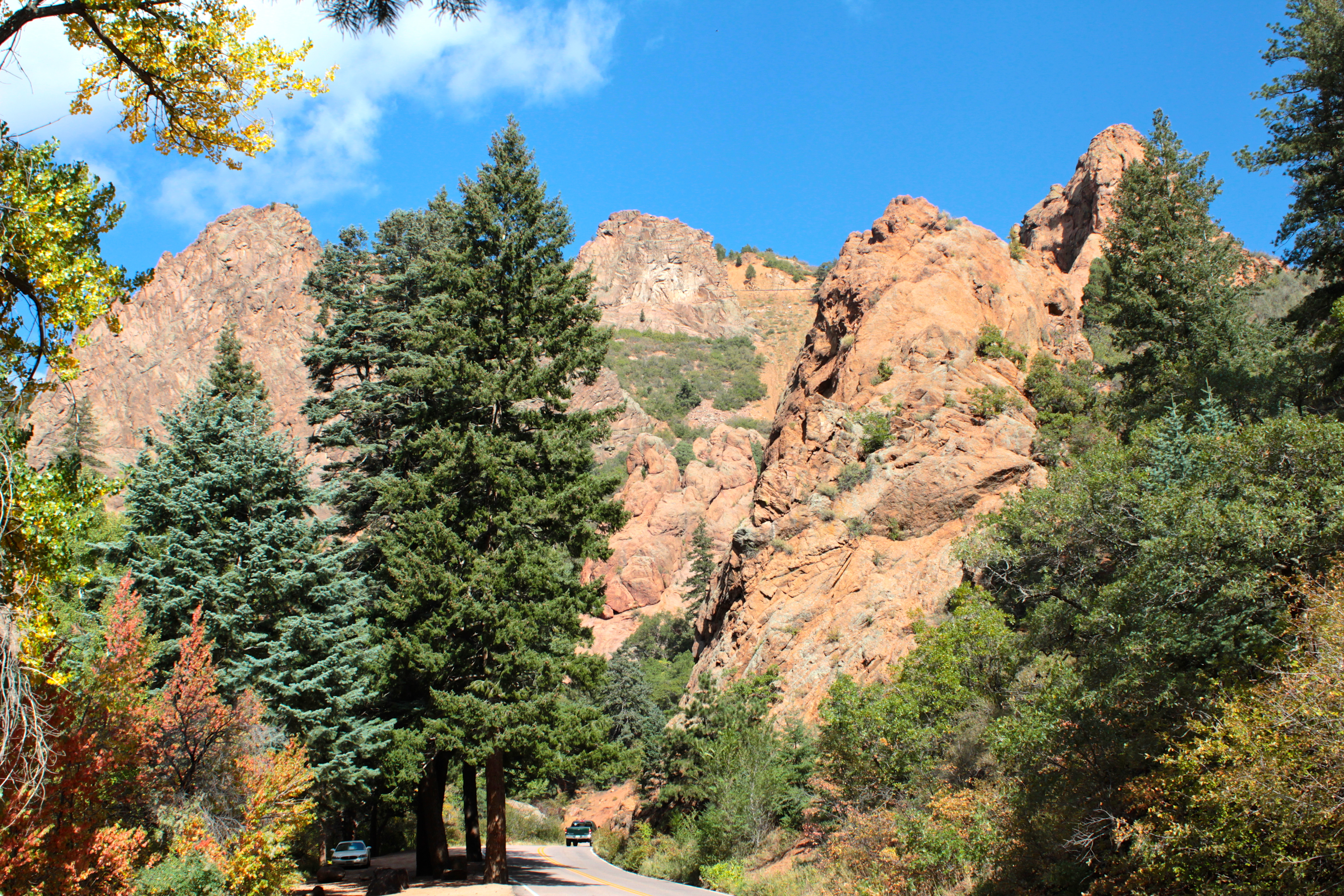
- North Cheyenne Cañon Park

- Location within Colorado Location within the United States
- Location: 2110 N. Cheyenne Cañon Road, Colorado Springs, Colorado
- Coordinates: 38°47′32″N 104°53′11″W
- Area: 147.7 acres (59.8 ha)
- NRHP reference No.: 09000489
- Added to NRHP: 2009

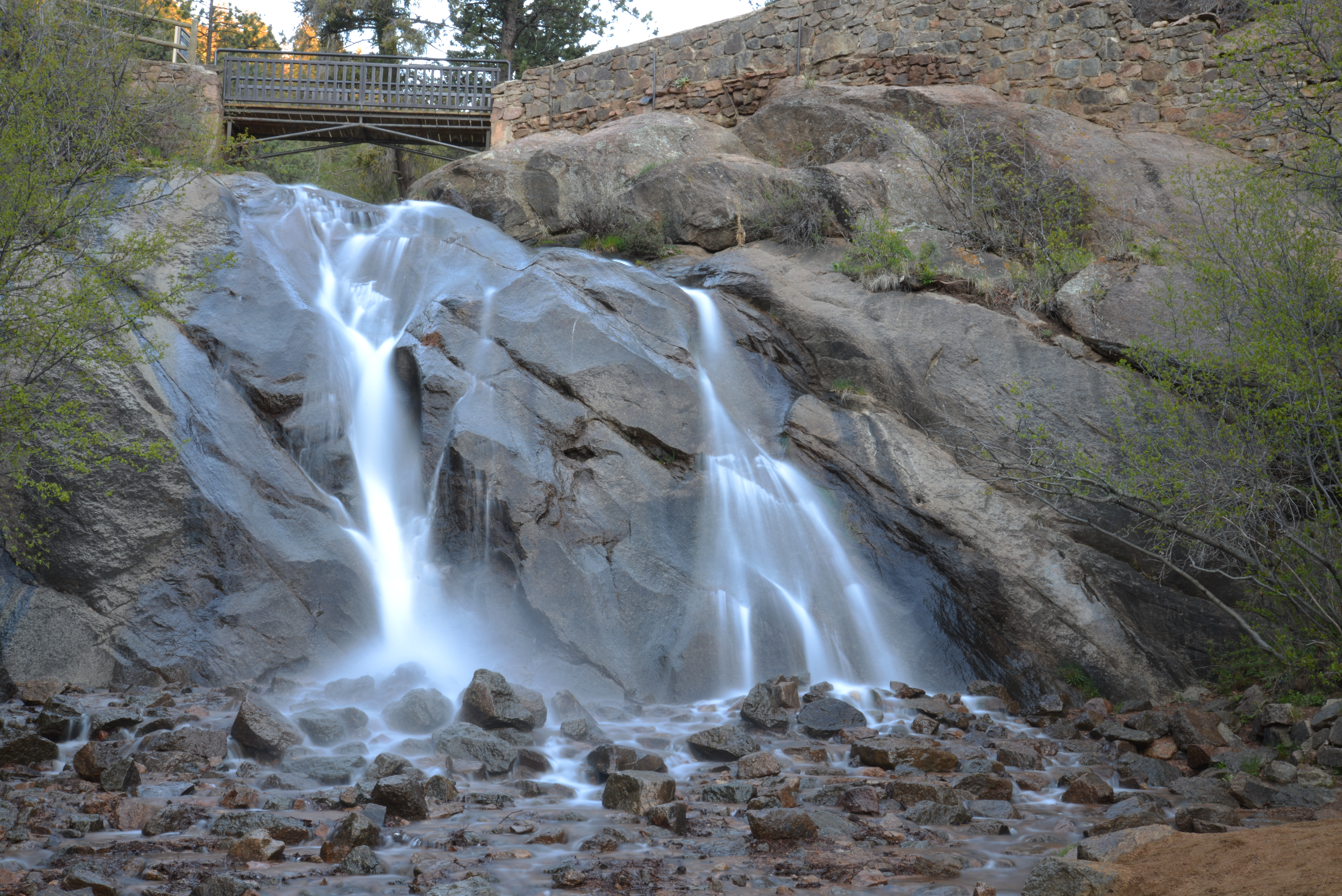
Helen Hunt Falls

North Cheyenne Cañon Park or North Cheyenne Canyon Park is a regional park located in Colorado Springs, Colorado. It is a National Register of Historic Places listing.

It was also called Colorado College Park and Cheyenne Park.

== Geography ==
The entrance to North Cheyenne Cañon is about 4.5 miles (7.2 km) southwest of downtown Colorado Springs, where Cheyenne Cañon, along Cheyenne Boulevard, splits into the north and south cañons. Pierre Shale, the bedrock for Colorado Springs, and Sawatch Sandstone are found at the mouth of North and South Cheyenne Cañons.

== History ==
General William Jackson Palmer donated land to establish the park, along with other Colorado Springs parks, such as Monument Valley Park, Bear Creek Cañon Park, Palmer Park, Pioneer Square (South) Park, and Prospect Lake. He donated a total of 1,270 acres (510 ha) of land. The land donated by Palmer for North Cheyenne Cañon Park included Silver Cascade Falls, Helen Hunt Falls, North Cheyenne Cañon Road and other land in North Cheyenne Cañon. The city purchased 640 acres (260 ha) in North Cheyenne Cañon after citizens of Colorado Springs voted for the measure in 1885. The cañon was considered by the Park Commission to be "by far the grandest and most popular of all the beautiful cañons near the city."

== Overview ==
North Cheyenne Cañon Park is located at 2110 N. Cheyenne Cañon Road. The 1,276.9-acre (516.7 ha) park includes Helen Hunt Falls, Starsmore Visitor and Nature Center, Silver Cascade Falls and the White Fir Botanical Reserve.

There are 56 miles (90 km) of trails for hiking, horseback riding and mountain biking and a scenic drive. Picnic areas are throughout the park with one large group shelter available by reservation.

A dirt parking lot at the top of the cañon provides access to trail heads, mountain biking paths, and Gold Camp Road. Parking in the lot is often limited and access to Gold Camp Road and High Drive is blocked to vehicles, but hikers and bikers may pass. Leading up to the parking lot is a series of pull-offs which may be of use when the dirt lot is full.

== Starsmore Visitor and Nature Center ==
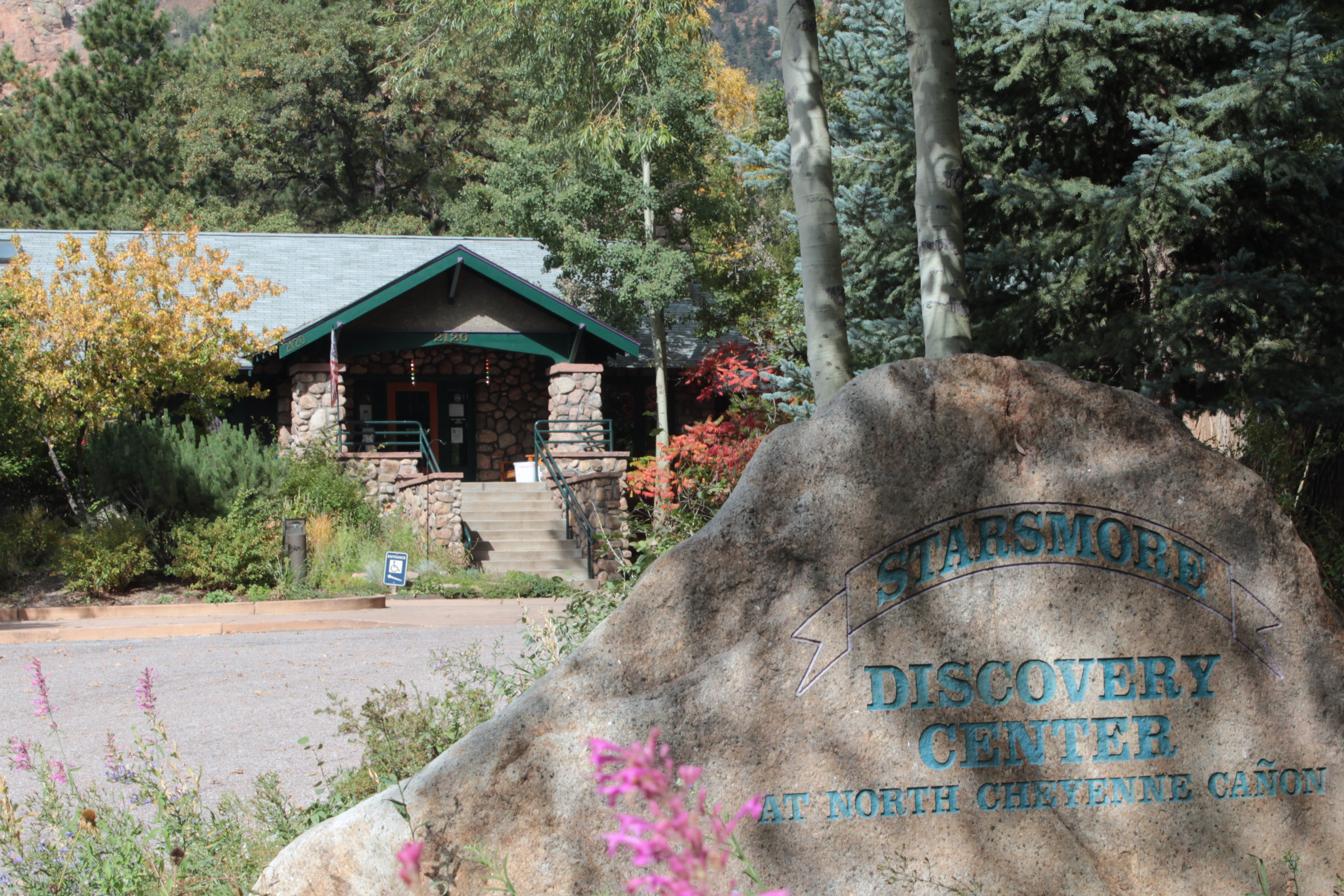
Starsmore Discovery Center

The Starsmore Visitor and Nature Center is located on South Cheyenne Canyon Road at the entrance to North Cheyenne Cañon Park. It is the visitor center for the North Cheyenne Cañon Park that has hands-on exhibits, nature programs, and information about the park. The lower columbine trails starts near Starsmore and continues on for about 4 miles (6.4 km) to Helen Hunt Falls. Starsmore is open from April to October.

== Trails ==
After passing the Helen Hunt Falls Visitor Center, N. Cheyenne Cañon Road ends in a dirt parking lot located at the junction of Gold Camp Road and High Drive. From this point, hikers have access to a multitude of trails.

=== Columbine Trail ===
The Columbine Trail is a 4 miles (6.4 km) long trail that slowly ascends the cañon beginning at Starsmore Visitor and Nature Center and makes its way up to the dirt parking lot at the top of the cañon. This trail is not a loop and the trail crosses N. Cheyenne Cañon Road multiple times.

=== St. Mary's Falls Trail ===
To access St. Mary's Falls Trail, hikers must hike 1.2 miles (1.9 km) along Gold Camp Road to reach the trailhead for the falls themselves. When hikers reach the third tunnel of Gold Camp Road, the trail climbs up over the tunnel and descends into Pike National Forest where it continues for another 1.6 miles (2.6 km) to the base of the falls. The trail has multiple switchbacks, some of which may not be clearly marked, and a fork with a path to the peak of Mount Rosa.

=== Seven Bridges Trail ===
Not to be confused with the Seven Falls in S. Cheyenne Cañon, this moderate trail is 1.5 miles (2.4 km) and is accessible from the west side of Gold Camp Road. The trailhead itself isn't clearly marked from the road, but a clearing on the right coming from the dirt parking lot is where the trail begins. The trail itself crosses Cheyenne Creek multiple times in a series of wooden bridges marked from one to seven. After crossing the final bridge, the trail ends, but the more adventurous may proceed to much more difficult terrain leading to other trails in the region.
