= Front Range =

Mountain range of the Southern Rocky Mountains of North America

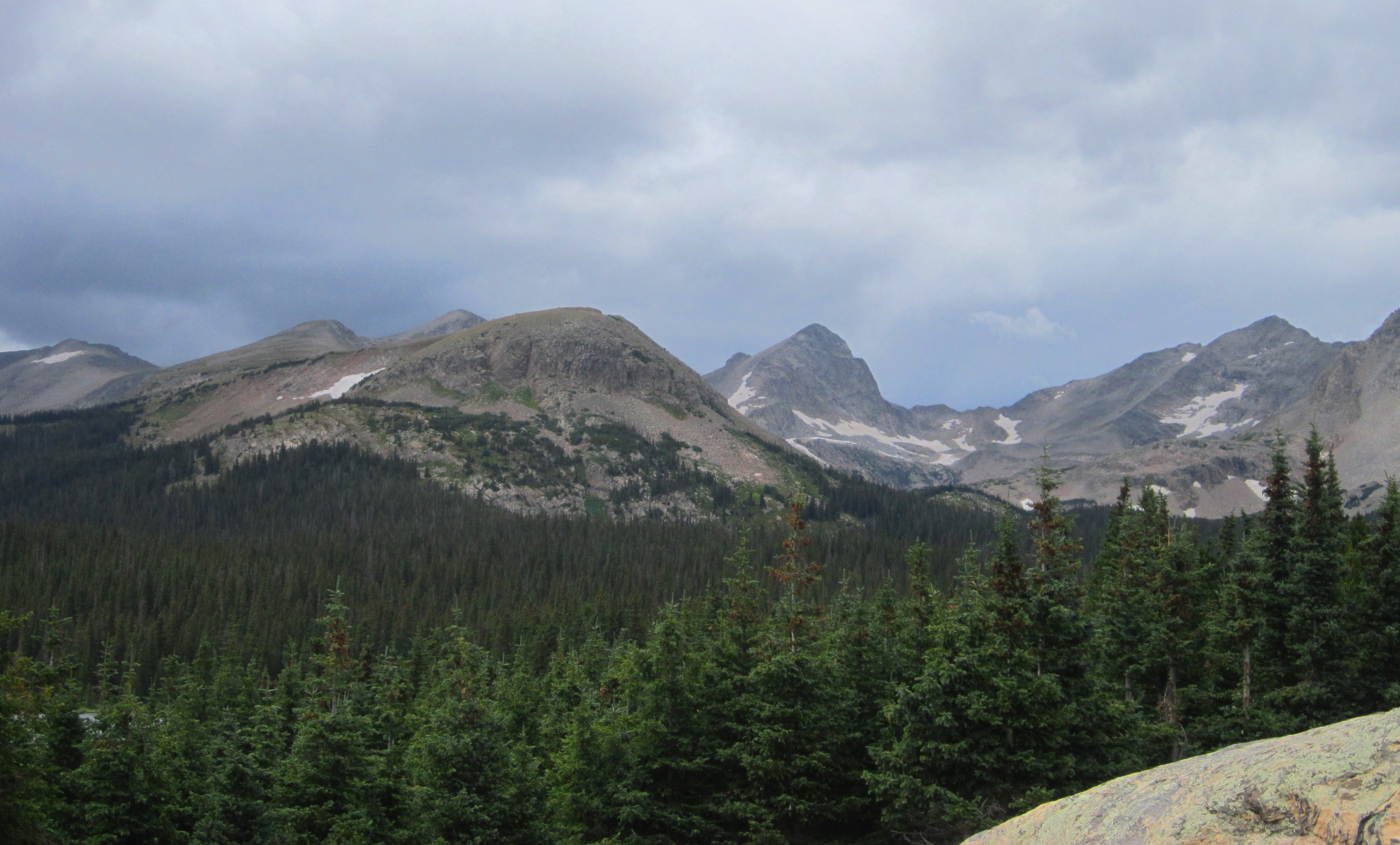
- Front Range Peaks in the Indian Peaks Wilderness

Highest point
- Peak: Grays Peak
- Elevation: 14,278 ft (4,352 m)
- Coordinates: 39°38′02″N 105°49′01″W

Geography
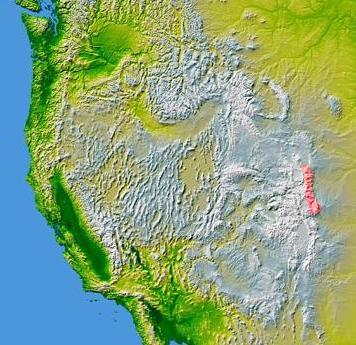
- The Front Range (excluding the Laramie Mountains) is shown highlighted on a map of the western U.S.
- Country: United States
- States: Colorado; Wyoming
- Parent range: Rocky Mountains

The Front Range is a mountain range of the Southern Rocky Mountains of North America located in the central portion of the U.S. State of Colorado, and southeastern portion of the U.S. State of Wyoming. It is the first mountain range encountered as one goes westbound along the 40th parallel north across the Great Plains of North America.

The Front Range runs north–south between Casper, Wyoming, and Pueblo, Colorado, and rises nearly 10,000 feet above the Great Plains. Longs Peak, Mount Blue Sky, and Pikes Peak are its most prominent peaks, visible from the Interstate 25 corridor. The area is a popular destination for mountain biking, hiking, climbing, and camping during the warmer months and for skiing and snowboarding during winter. Millions of years ago, the present-day Front Range was home to ancient mountain ranges, deserts, beaches, and even oceans.

The name "Front Range" is also applied to the Front Range urban corridor, the populated region of Colorado and Wyoming just east of the mountain range and extending from Cheyenne, Wyoming south to Pueblo, Colorado. This urban corridor benefits from the weather-moderating effect of the Front Range mountains, which help block prevailing storms.

== Geology ==
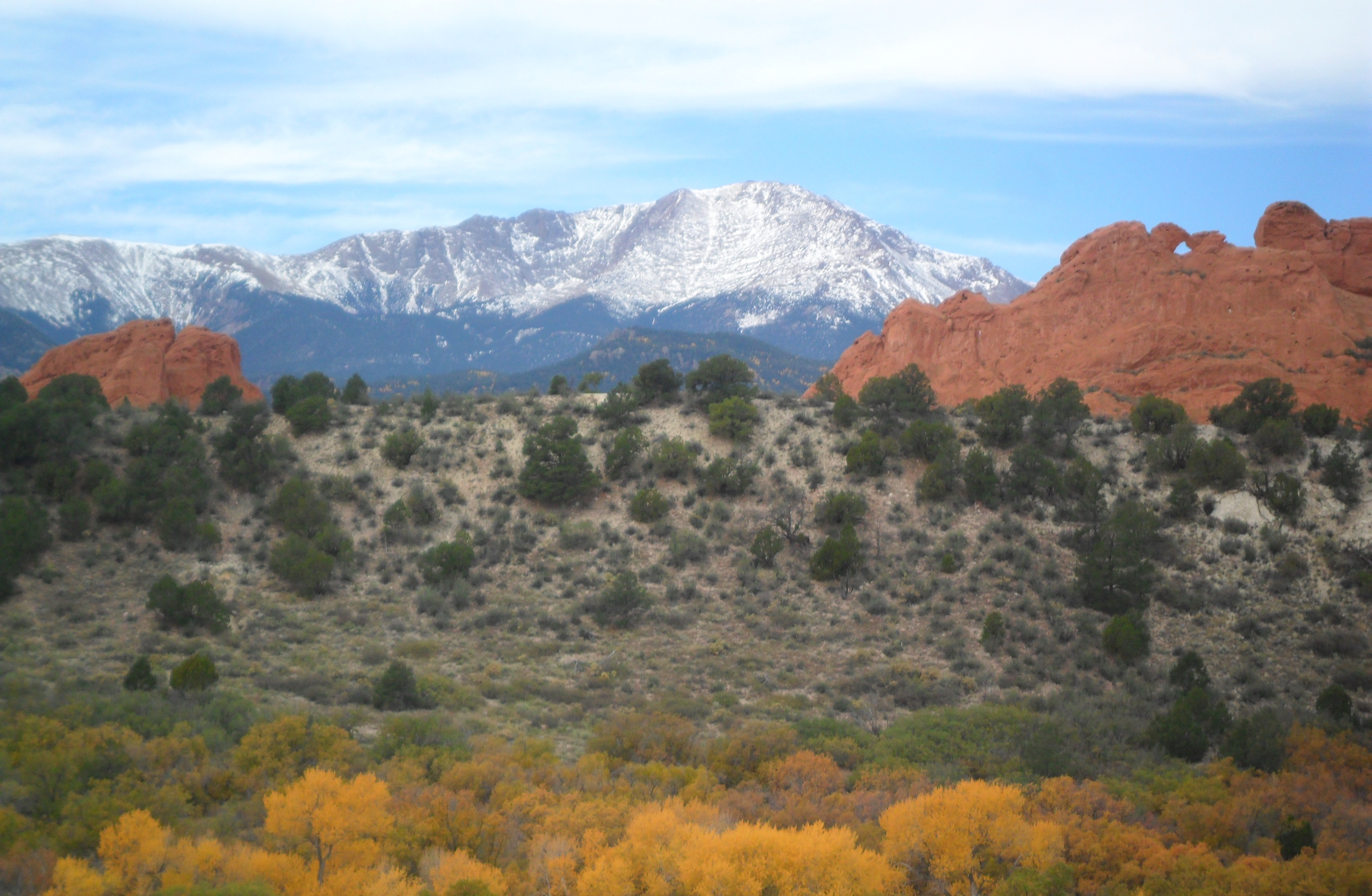
Pikes Peak and Garden of the Gods

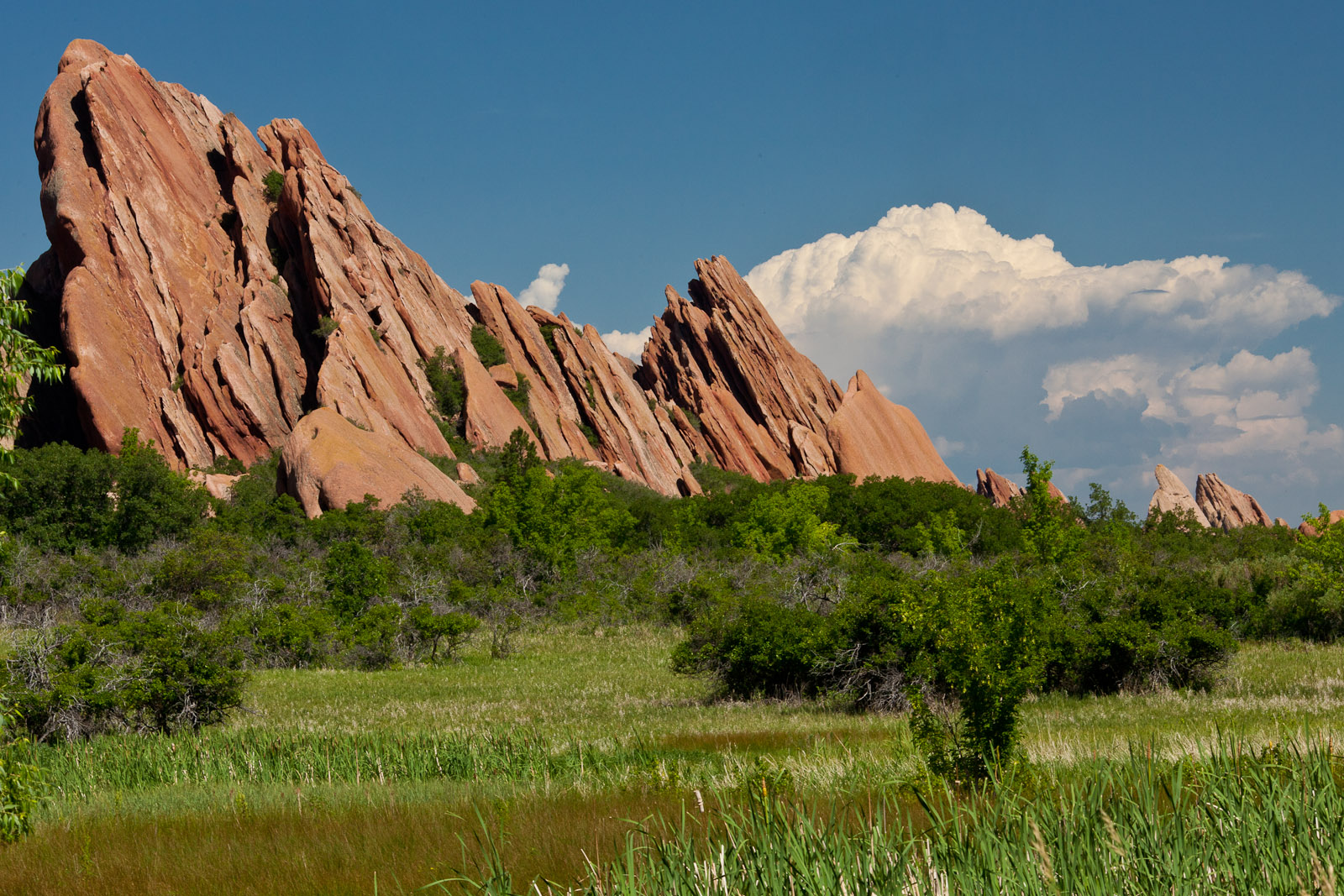
Uplifted Lyons Sandstone slabs along the eastern edge of the Front Range

=== Pikes Peak Granite ===
About 1 billion years ago, a mass of magma rose to the surface through a much older mantle, cooling to form what is now known as the Precambrian Pikes Peak Granite. Over the next 500 million years, the granite eroded with no sedimentation forming over this first uplift, resulting in a local expression of the Great Unconformity. At about 500–300 million years ago, the region began to sink and sediments began to deposit in the newly formed accommodation space. Eroded granite produced sand particles that began to form strata, layers of sediment, in the sinking basin. Sedimentation would continue to take place until about 300 million years ago.

=== Fountain formation ===
Around 300 million years ago, the sinking suddenly reversed, and the sediment-covered granite began to uplift, giving rise to the Ancestral Rocky Mountains. Over the next 150 million years, during the uplift the mountains continued to erode and cover their flanks in their own sediment. Wind, gravity, rainwater, snow, and ice-melt supplied rivers that ultimately carved through the granite mountains and eventually led to their complete removal. The sediment from these mountains lies in the very red Fountain Formation today. Red Rocks Amphitheatre outside of Denver, Colorado, is set within the Fountain Formation.

=== Lyons Sandstone ===
At 280 million years ago, sea levels were low and present-day Colorado was part of the super-continent Pangaea. Sand deserts covered most of the area, spreading as dunes seen in the rock record, known today as the Lyons Sandstone. These dunes appear to be cross-bedded and show various fossil footprints and leaf imprints in many of the strata making up the section. Uplifted beds of Lyons Sandstone are found along the Front range and form the gateway to the Garden of the Gods.

=== Lykins Formation ===
30 million years later, the sediment deposition was still taking place with the introduction of the Lykins Shale. This formation can be best attributed to its wavy layers of muddy limestone and signs of stromatolites that thrived in a tidal flat in present-day Colorado. 250 million years ago, the Ancestral Rockies were eroding away while the shoreline was present during the break-up of Pangaea. This formation began right after Earth's largest extinction 251 million years ago at the Permian–Triassic Boundary. Ninety percent of the planet's marine life became extinct and a great deal on land as well.

=== Morrison Formation ===
After 100 million years of deposition, a new environment brought rise to a new formation, the sandstone Morrison Formation. The Morrison Formation contains some of the best fossils of the Late Jurassic. It is especially known for its sauropod tracks and sauropod bones, among other dinosaur fossils. As identified by the fossil record, the environment was filled with various types of vegetation such as ferns and Zamites. While this time period boasts many types of plants, grass had not yet evolved.

=== Dakota Sandstone ===
The Dakota Sandstone, which was deposited around 100 million years ago at the opening of the Cretaceous Western Interior Seaway from the Arctic to the Tropics, shows evidence of ferns and dinosaur tracks. Sheets of ripple marks can be seen on some of the strata, confirming advancing and retreating near-shore environments. These Dakota Group sandstone beds are resistant to erosion and have uplifted to form the Dakota Hogback, a ridge between the mountains and the plains.

=== Benton Group / Niobrara Formation ===
Over the next 35 million years, the Cretaceous seaway repeatedly widened as far as Utah and Wisconsin and narrowed to near closure. With no mountains present at the time, the Colorado area was in the line of the deepest channel of the seaway; but being on the Transcontinental Arch, the Front Range areas was relatively shallow and was near the last land to submerge as the seaway opened. Shale and chalk were deposited over the area as Greenhorn of the Benton Group and the Niobrara Formation. Within these beds are found abundant marine fossils (ammonites and skeletons of fish and such marine reptiles as mosasaurs, plesiosaurs, and extinct species of sea turtles) along with rare dinosaur and bird remains. Today, the Fort Hays Limestone member forms flatirons or secondary hogbacks on the east slope of the Dakota Hogback.

=== Pierre Shale ===
The non-chalky shales of the Pierre Formation formed in the final cycle of the seaway. At about 68 million years ago, the Front Range began to rise again due to the Laramide Orogeny in the western half of the state, draining from being at the bottom of a sea to land again, giving yield to another fossiliferous rock layer, the Denver Formation.

=== Denver Formation ===
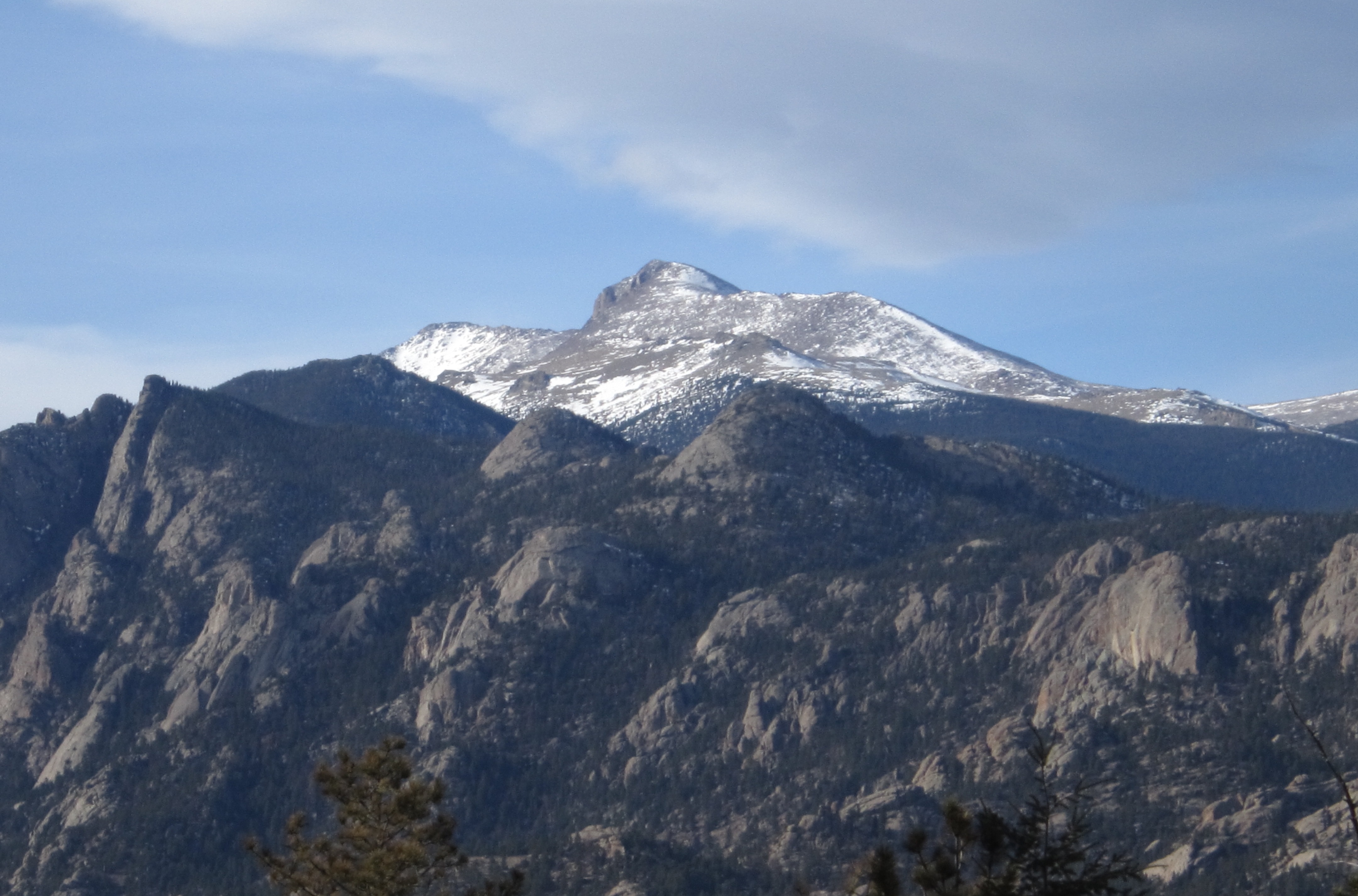
Front Range near Estes Park, Colorado (Mummy Mountain)

The Denver Formation contains fossils of dinosaurs like Tyrannosaurus rex and Triceratops. While the forests of vegetation, dinosaurs, and other organisms thrived, their reign would come to an end at the Cretaceous–Paleogene boundary (which was formerly known as the K-T boundary). In an instant, millions of species were obliterated by a meteor impact in Mexico's Yucatán Peninsula. While this extinction led to the demise of the dinosaurs and other organisms, some life did prevail to repopulate the earth as it recovered from this tremendous disaster. The uplifted mountains continued to constantly erode and, by 40 million years ago, the region was once again buried in material eroded from the central mountains.

=== Castle Rock Conglomerate ===
Suddenly, 37 million years ago, a great volcanic eruption took place in the Collegiate Range and covered the landscape in hot ash that instantly torched and consumed everything across the landscape. An entire lush environment was capped in a matter of minutes with 20 feet of extremely resistant rock, rhyolite. However, as seen before, life rebounds, and after a few million years mass floods cut through the rhyolite and eroded much of it as plants and animals began to recolonize the landscape. The mass flooding and erosion of the volcanic rock formed the Castle Rock Conglomerate that can be found in the Front Range.

=== Quaternary deposits ===
Eventually, at about 10 million years ago, the Front Range began to rise up again and the resistant granite in the heart of the mountains thrust upwards and stood tall, while the weaker sediments deposited above it eroded away. As the Front Range rose, streams and recent (16,000 years ago) glaciations during the Quaternary age literally unburied the range by cutting through the weaker sediment and giving rise to the granitic peaks present today. This was the last step in forming the present-day geologic sequence and history of today's Front Range.

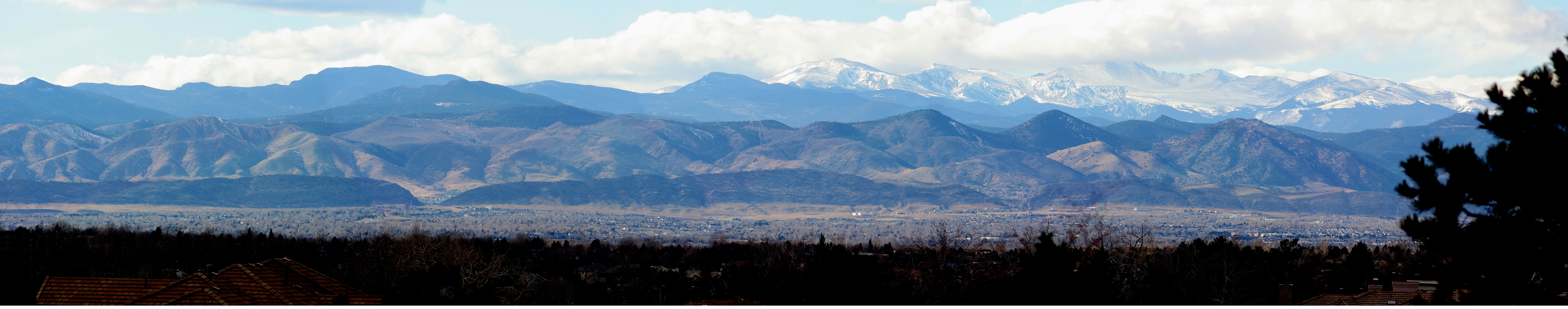
The Front Range as viewed from Greenwood Village south of Denver, Mount Blue Sky is on the far right, in the clouds.

== Prominent peaks ==
The Front Range includes the highest peaks along the eastern edge of the Rockies. The highest mountain peak in the Front Range is Grays Peak. Other notable mountains include Torreys Peak, Mount Blue Sky, Longs Peak, Pikes Peak, and Mount Bierstadt.

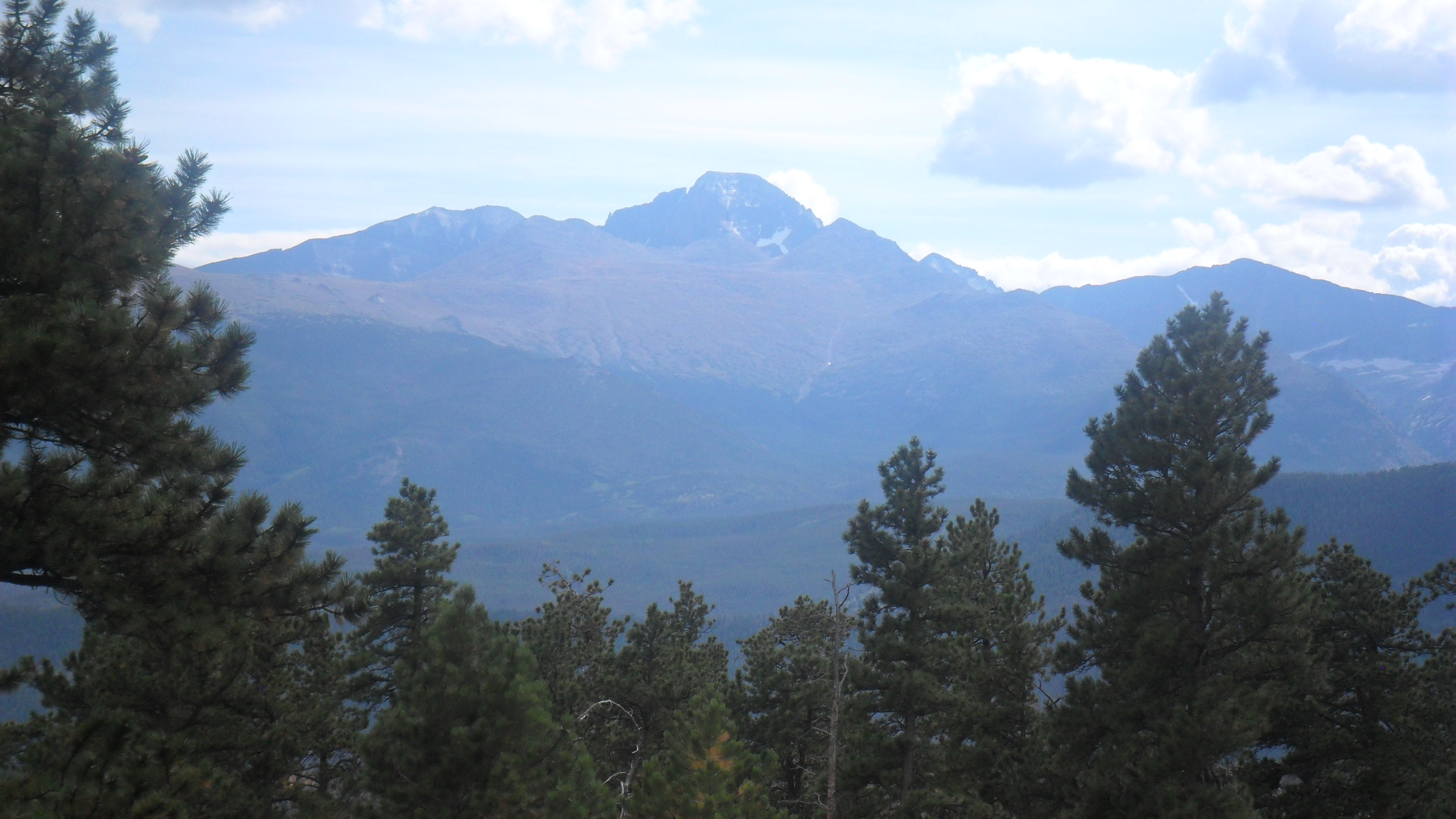
Longs Peak

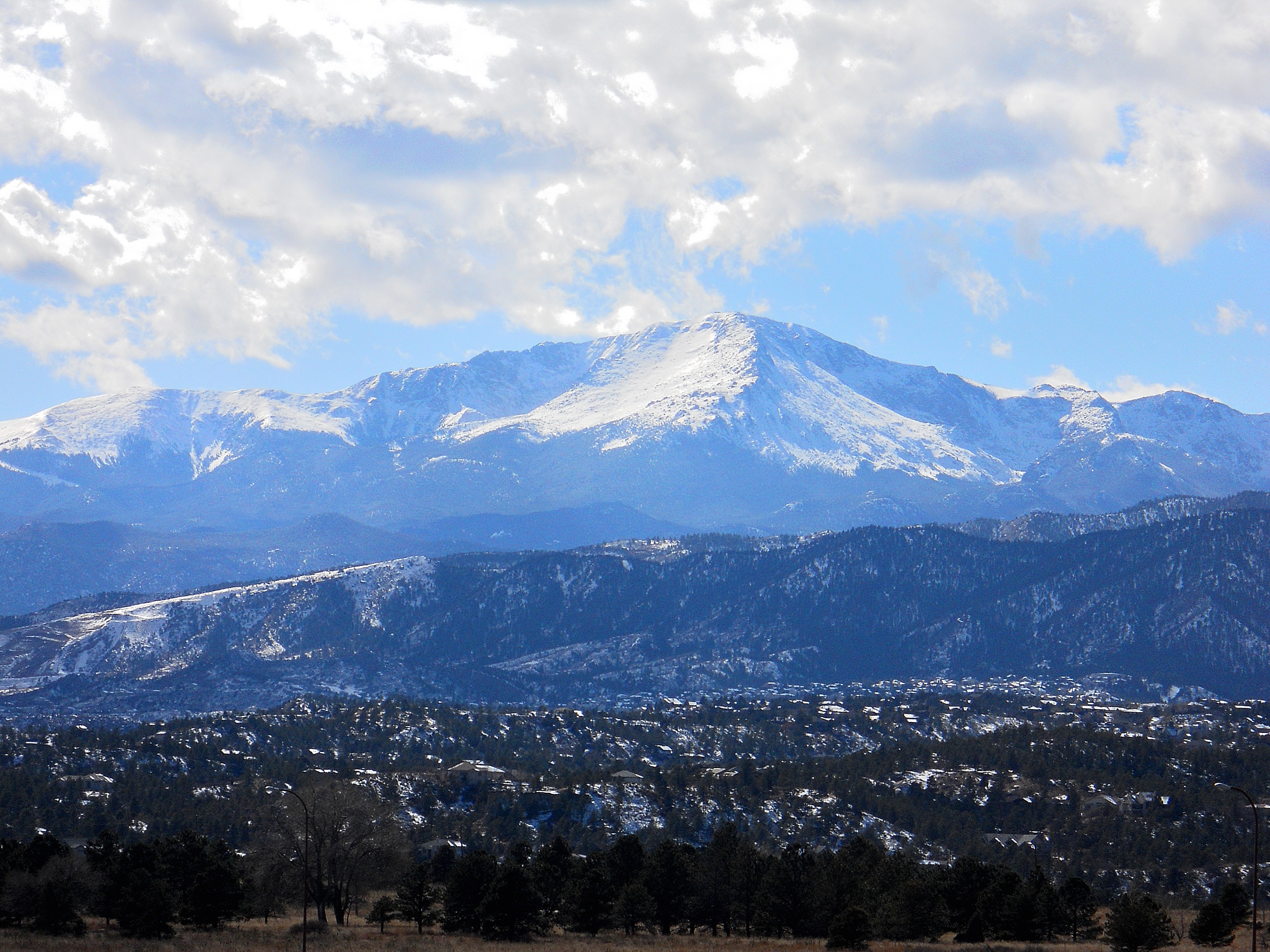
Pikes Peak

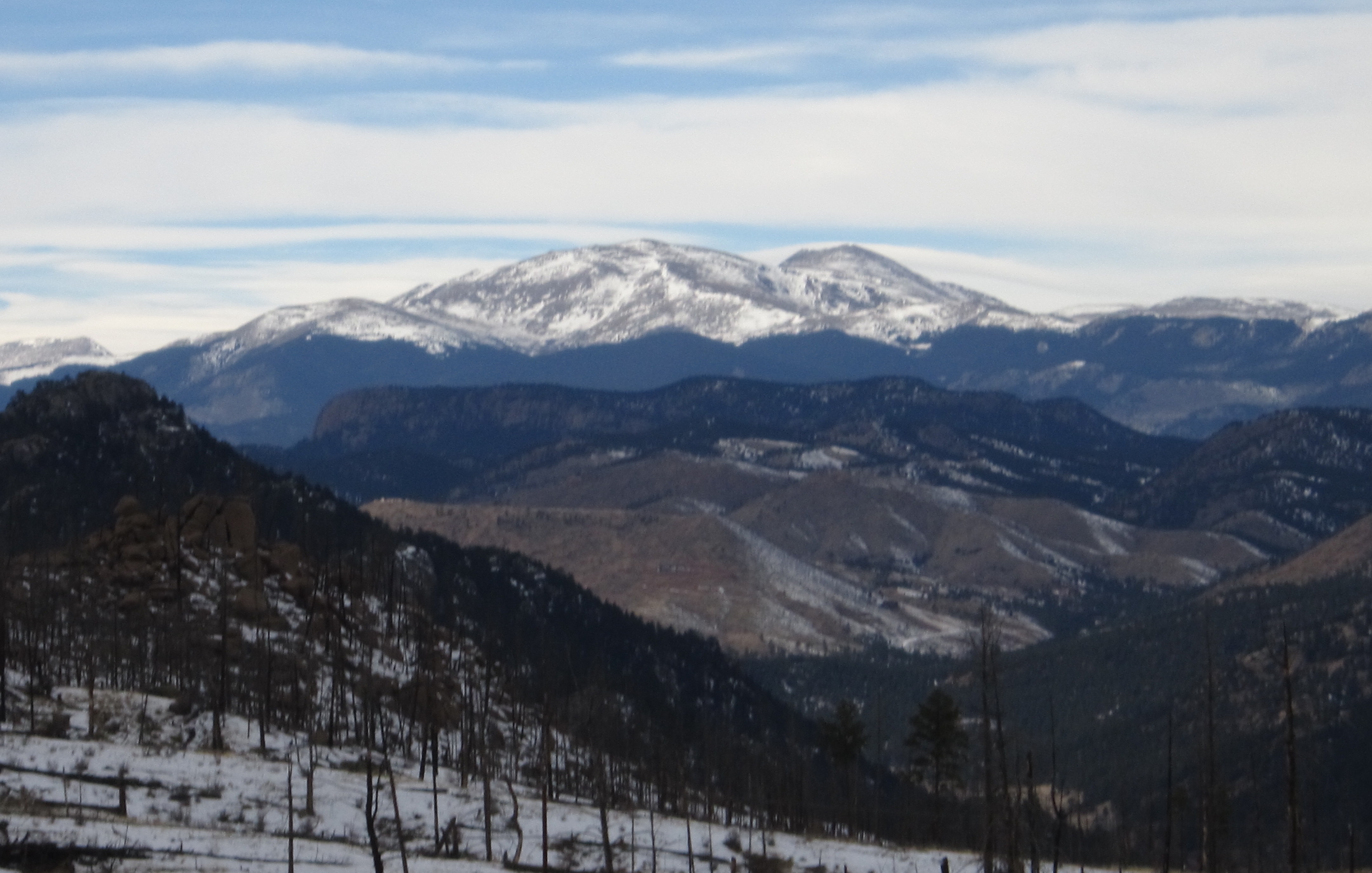
Mount Blue Sky

The 20 Mountain Peaks of the Front Range With At Least 500 Meters of Topographic Prominence
Rank	Mountain Peak	Subrange	Elevation	Prominence	Isolation
1	Grays Peak NGS	Front Range	14,278 ft 4352 m	2,770 ft 844 m	25 mi 40.3 km
2	Mount Blue Sky NGS	Front Range	14,265 ft 4348 m	2,769 ft 844 m	9.79 mi 15.76 km
3	Longs Peak NGS	Front Range	14,259 ft 4346 m	2,940 ft 896 m	43.6 mi 70.2 km
4	Pikes Peak NGS	Pikes Peak Massif	14,115 ft 4302 m	5,530 ft 1686 m	60.8 mi 97.8 km
5	Mount Silverheels NGS PB	Front Range	13,829 ft 4215 m	2,283 ft 696 m	5.48 mi 8.82 km
6	Bald Mountain PB	Front Range	13,690 ft 4173 m	2,099 ft 640 m	7.51 mi 12.09 km
7	Bard Peak PB	Front Range	13,647 ft 4159 m	1,701 ft 518 m	5.43 mi 8.74 km
8	Hagues Peak NGS PB	Mummy Range	13,573 ft 4137 m	2,420 ft 738 m	15.92 mi 25.6 km
9	North Arapaho Peak PB	Indian Peaks PB	13,508 ft 4117 m	1,665 ft 507 m	15.4 mi 24.8 km
10	Parry Peak	Front Range	13,397 ft 4083 m	1,731 ft 528 m	9.46 mi 15.22 km
11	Mount Richthofen PB	Front Range	12,945 ft 3946 m	2,680 ft 817 m	9.66 mi 15.54 km
12	Specimen Mountain PB	Front Range	12,494 ft 3808 m	1,731 ft 528 m	4.86 mi 7.82 km
13	Bison Peak NGS PB	Tarryall Mountains PB	12,432 ft 3789 m	2,451 ft 747 m	19.14 mi 30.8 km
14	Waugh Mountain PB	South Park Hills PB	11,716 ft 3571 m	2,330 ft 710 m	20 mi 32.2 km
15	Black Mountain NGS PB	South Park Hills PB	11,649 ft 3551 m	2,234 ft 681 m	8.03 mi 12.92 km
16	Williams Peak NGS PB	South Williams Fork Mountains PB	11,620 ft 3542 m	2,049 ft 625 m	10.79 mi 17.37 km
17	Puma Peak PB	South Park Hills PB	11,575 ft 3528 m	2,260 ft 689 m	7.44 mi 11.97 km
18	Thirtynine Mile Mountain PB	South Park Hills PB	11,553 ft 3521 m	2,088 ft 636 m	10.61 mi 17.08 km
19	Twin Sisters Peaks PB	Front Range	11,433 ft 3485 m	2,328 ft 710 m	4.36 mi 7.01 km
20	South Bald Mountain	Laramie Mountains	11,007 ft 3355 m	1,844 ft 562 m	13.66 mi 22 km

== Travel ==
The two main interstate highways that run through the Front Range are Interstate 70, which crosses at the Eisenhower Tunnel, west of Denver, Colorado and continues on to Grand Junction, Colorado after passing Vail Pass, and Interstate 80, which crosses Sherman Summit near Laramie, Wyoming. U.S. Route 34 travels through Rocky Mountain National Park although this route is typically closed from October to May. From there it continues to its terminus at Granby where us U.S. Route 40 continues to Steamboat Springs and eventually Salt Lake City. U.S. Route 24 travels through the southern Front Range west of Colorado Springs, eventually connecting with I-70 west of Vail, Colorado after crossing the Continental Divide at Tennessee Pass. Farther to the south, U.S. 50 crosses the divide at Monarch Pass while passing through Gunnison, Montrose and eventually meets with I-70 in Grand Junction, while U.S. 160 crosses La Veta Pass and Wolf Creek Pass whilst passing through Alamosa and Durango. North to South travel in the Southern Rockies is facilitated by Interstate 25, U.S. 285 and U.S. Route 550.

Along with the roads that run through the Front Range, the Union Pacific Railroad operates two rail lines through the mountains. The first Overland Route, transiting southern Wyoming, runs parallel to I-80 for much of its way. The second is the former Denver & Rio Grande Western Railroad Moffat Route, which runs parallel to the Colorado River and through the 6.5-mile-long Moffat Tunnel. Originally the Denver and Salt Lake Railway, the former Rio Grande is used for freight by both Union Pacific and BNSF, and it is also used by Rocky Mountaineer's Rockies to the Red Rocks and Amtrak's California Zephyr and Winter Park Express.

== See also ==
- Eldorado Canyon State Park
- Flatirons
- Front Range Urban Corridor
- Garden of the Gods
- Mountain ranges of Colorado
- Palmer Divide
- Red Rocks Park
- Rocky Mountain Front
- Roxborough State Park
