= Hagues Peak =

Mountain in Colorado, United States

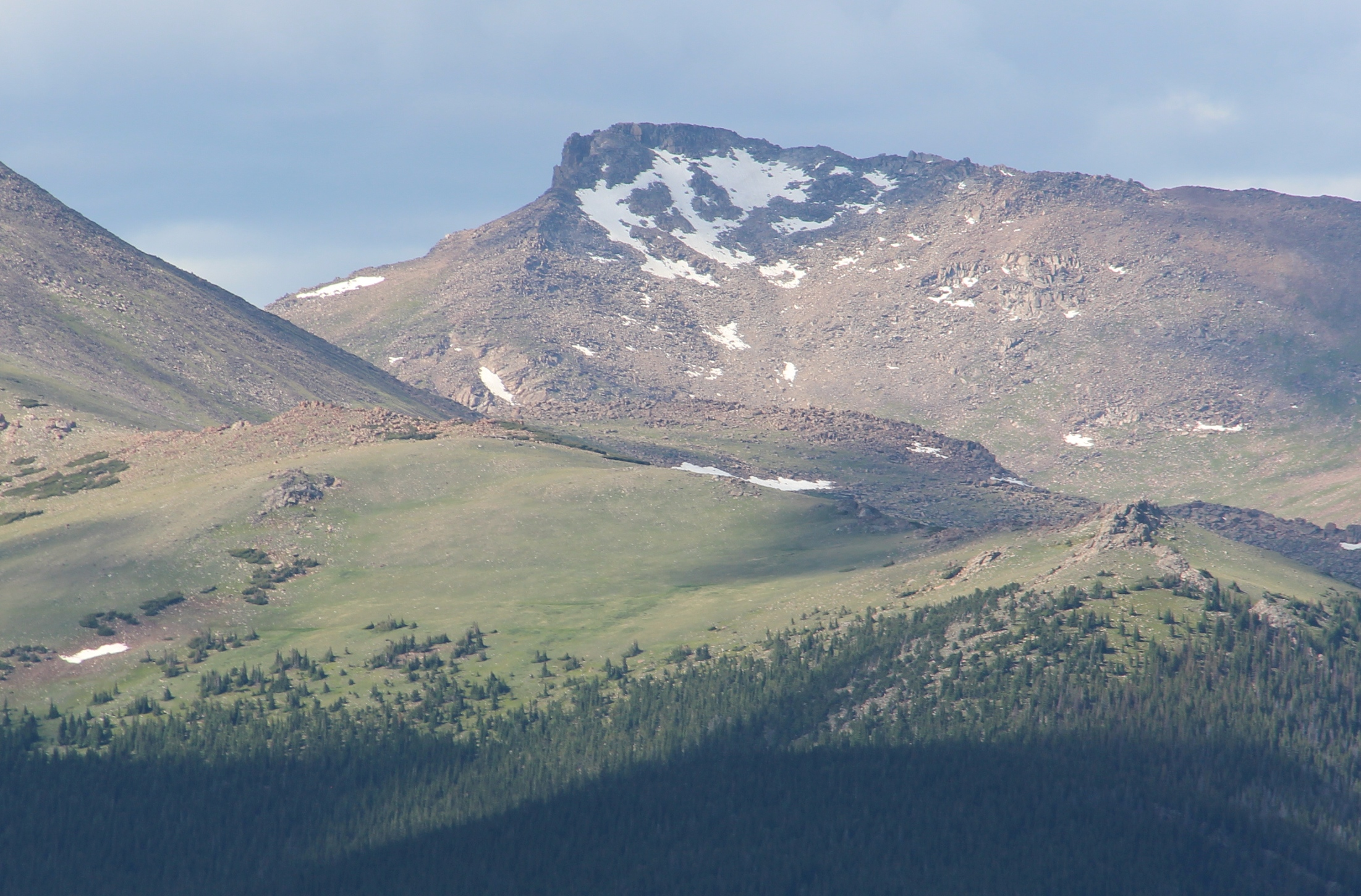
- Hagues Peak viewed from Trail Ridge Road

Highest point
- Elevation: 13,573 ft (4,137 m)
- Prominence: 2,420 ft (738 m)
- Isolation: 15.70 mi (25.27 km)
- Listing: North America highest peaks 89th; US highest major peaks 72nd; Colorado highest major peaks 37th; Colorado county high points 24th
- Coordinates: 40°29′04″N 105°38′47″W

Geography
- Location within Colorado
- Location: Rocky Mountain National Park, High point of Larimer County, Colorado, United States
- Parent range: Mummy Range
- Topo map(s): USGS 7.5' topographic map Trail Ridge, Colorado

Climbing
- Easiest route: hike

Hagues Peak is the highest summit of the Mummy Range in the Rocky Mountains of North America. The 13,573-foot (4,137 m) thirteener is in the Rocky Mountain National Park Wilderness, 9.9 miles (15.9 km) northwest (bearing 318°) of the Town of Estes Park, Colorado, United States. Hagues Peak is the highest point in Larimer County, Colorado.

== Mountain ==
Hagues Peak is named after geologists James and Arnold Hague, who surveyed the area in the late 1800s. Fairchild Mountain is about 1.4 miles (2.3 km) to the southwest, while Mummy Mountain is about 1.4 miles (2.3 km) to the southeast. The Rowe Glacier lies about 300 yards (270 m) north of the mountain.

== See also ==
- List of mountain peaks of North America
  - List of mountain peaks of the United States
    - List of mountain peaks of Colorado
      - List of Colorado county high points
