= Mummy Range =

Mountain range in northern Colorado, United States

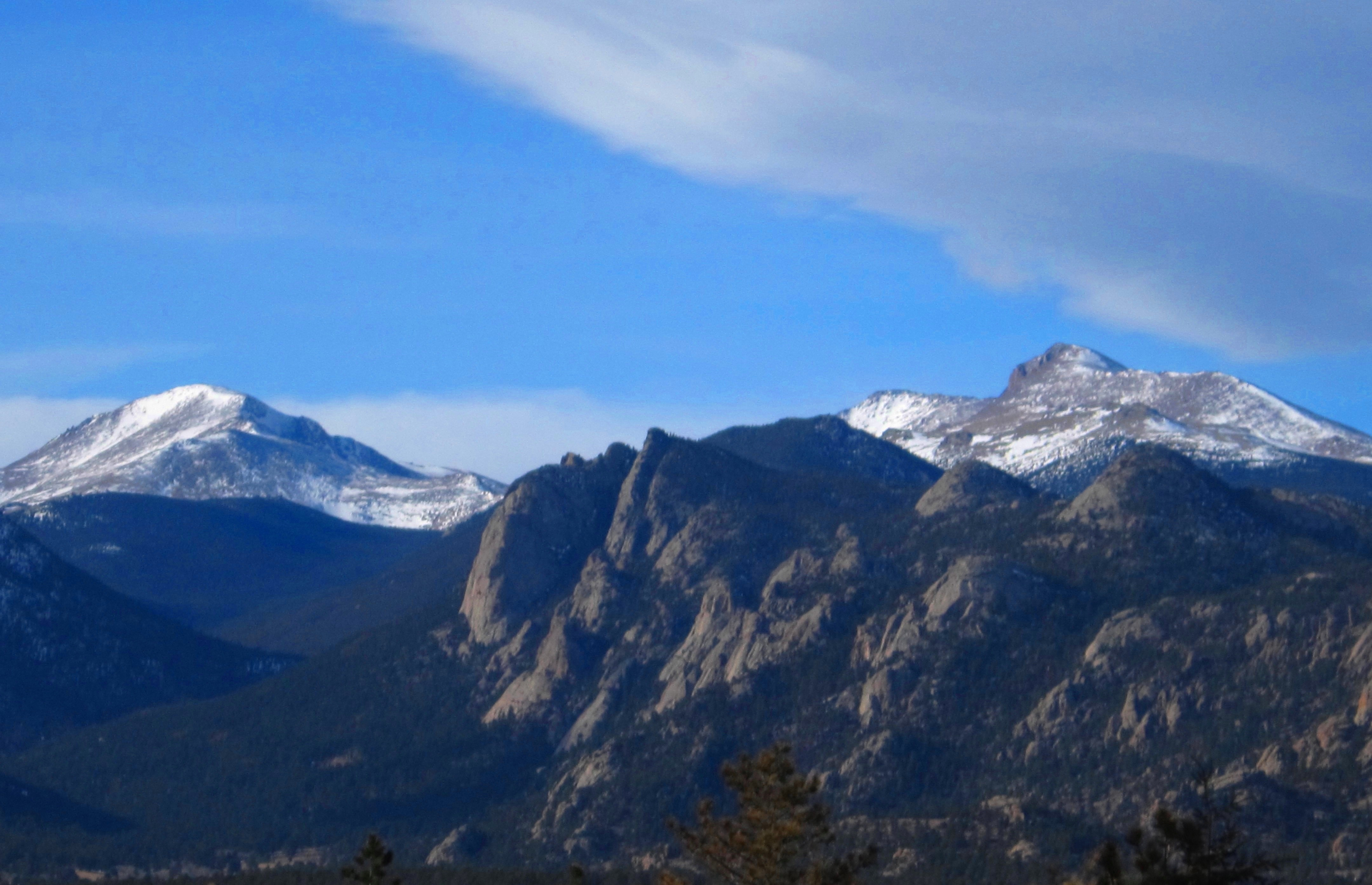
- Mummy Range seen from Lake Estes

Highest point
- Peak: Hagues Peak
- Elevation: 13,560 ft (4,130 m)
- Listing: Mountain ranges of Colorado
- Coordinates: 40°29′04″N 105°38′47″W

Dimensions
- Length: 21 mi (34 km) N/S
- Width: 19 mi (31 km) E/W
- Area: 229 mi^{2} (590 km^{2})

Geography
- Location within Colorado
- Country: United States
- State: Colorado
- County: Larimer
- Range coordinates: 40°34′45″N 105°43′34″W
- Parent range: Front Range, Rocky Mountains

The Mummy Range (elevation approximately 13,000 ft) is a mountain range in the Rocky Mountains of northern Colorado in the United States. The range is a short subrange of the Front Range located in southwestern Larimer County northwest of the town of Estes Park. It is located largely within Rocky Mountain National Park, extending north from Trail Ridge Road approximately 15 mi (24 km). The Arapaho name is "nooku-bee3ei-no," which translates to "White Owls."

Prominent peaks in the range include Hagues Peak, Ypsilon Mountain, Mummy Mountain, and Mount Chiquita. These peaks are easily accessible via the Lawn Lake trail leading to "the Saddle" between Hagues Peak and Fairchild Mountain and, on the southwestern end, the Chapin Pass trail from the Fall River road. Some offer reasonably challenging technical routes but all can be ascended by steep hiking and mild scrambling after snow melt.
