= Rocky Mountain National Park =

National park in Colorado, United States

- IUCN category II (national park)
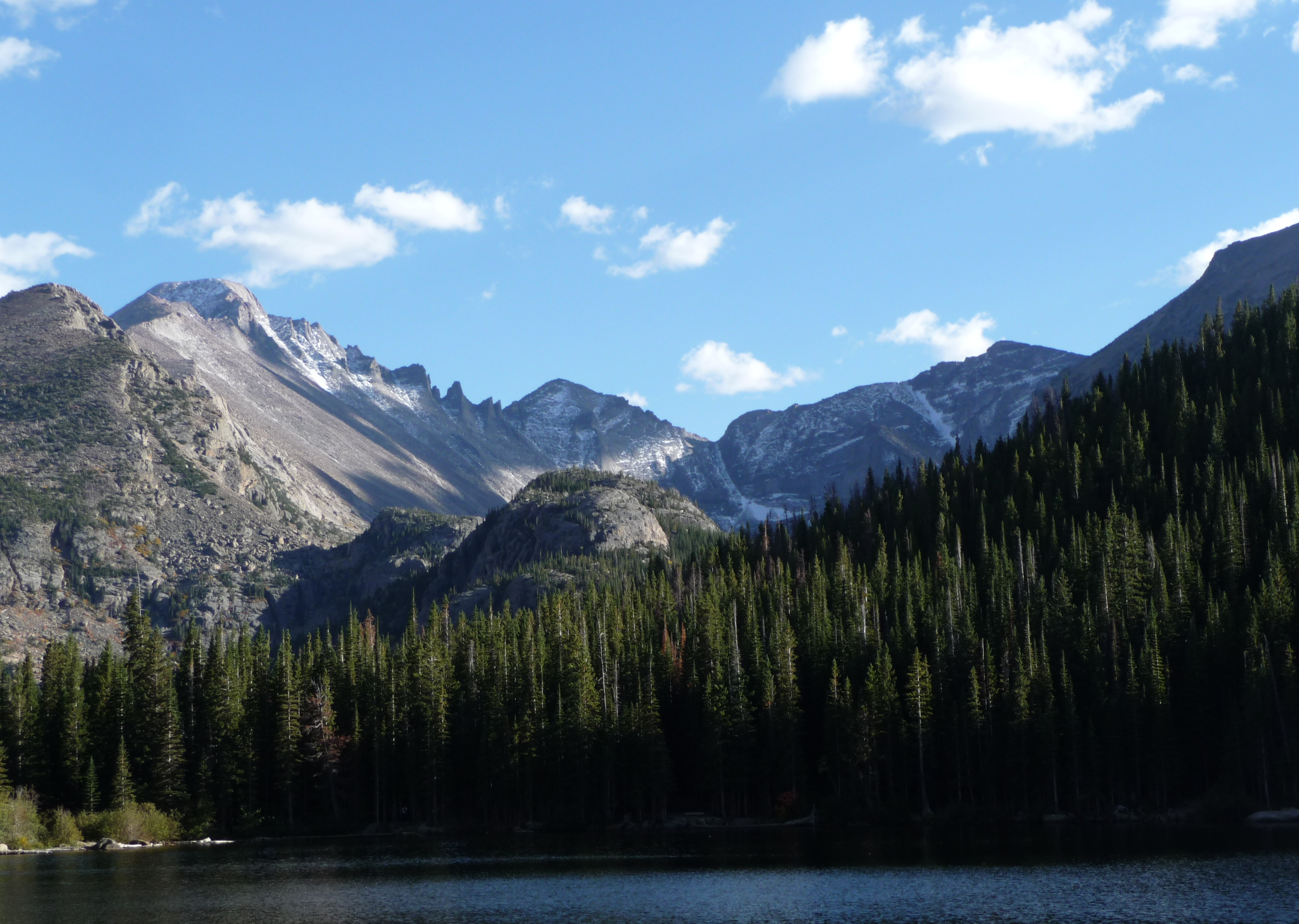
- View from Bear Lake in Rocky Mountain National Park
- Interactive map of Rocky Mountain National Park
- Location: Larimer / Grand / Boulder counties, Colorado, United States
- Nearest city: Estes Park and Grand Lake, Colorado
- Coordinates: 40.3466°N 105.7364°W
- Area: 265,461 acres (1,074.28 km^{2})
- Established: January 26, 1915; 111 years ago
- Visitors: 4,171,431 (in 2025)
- Governing body: National Park Service
- Website: Rocky Mountain National Park

Rocky Mountain National Park is a national park of the United States located approximately 55 mi (89 km) northwest of Denver in north-central Colorado, within the Front Range of the Rocky Mountains. The park is situated between the towns of Estes Park to the east and Grand Lake to the west. The eastern and western slopes of the Continental Divide run directly through the center of the park with the headwaters of the Colorado River located in the park's northwestern region. The main features of the park include mountains, alpine lakes and a wide variety of wildlife within various climates and environments, from wooded forests to mountain tundra.

The Rocky Mountain National Park Act was signed by President Woodrow Wilson on January 26, 1915, establishing the park boundaries and protecting the area for future generations. The Civilian Conservation Corps built the main automobile route, Trail Ridge Road, in the 1930s. In 1976, UNESCO designated the park as one of the first World Biosphere Reserves. In 2023, 4.1 million recreational visitors entered the park. The park is one of the most visited in the National Park System, ranking as the third most visited national park in 2015. In 2019, the park saw record attendance yet again with 4,678,804 visitors, a 44% increase since 2012.

The park has five visitor centers, with park headquarters located at the Beaver Meadows Visitor Center—a National Historic Landmark designed by the Frank Lloyd Wright School of Architecture at Taliesin West. National forest lands surround the park on all sides, including Roosevelt National Forest to the north and east, Routt National Forest to the north and west, and Arapaho National Forest to the west and south, with the Indian Peaks Wilderness area located directly south of the park.

== History ==
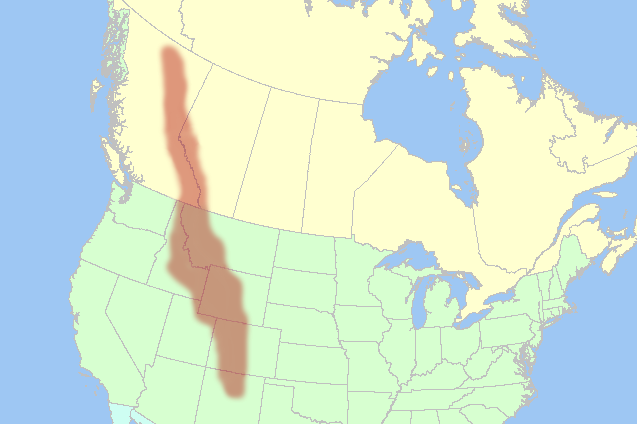
Location of the Rocky Mountains

The history of Rocky Mountain National Park began when Paleo-Indians traveled a route near what is now Trail Ridge Road to hunt and forage for food. Ute and Arapaho people subsequently hunted and camped in the area. In 1820, the Long Expedition, led by Stephen H. Long for whom Longs Peak was named, approached the Rockies via the Platte River. Settlers began arriving in the mid-1800s, displacing the Native Americans by 1878.

Lulu City, Dutchtown, and Gaskill in the Never Summer Mountains were established in the 1870s when prospectors came in search of gold and silver. The boom ended by 1883 with miners deserting their claims. The railroad reached Lyons, Colorado in 1881 and the Big Thompson Canyon Road—a section of U.S. Route 34 from Loveland to Estes Park—was completed in 1904. The 1920s saw a boom in building lodges, including the Bear Lake Trail School, and roads in the park, culminating with the construction of Trail Ridge Road to Fall River Pass between 1929 and 1932, then to Grand Lake by 1938.

Prominent individuals in the effort to create a national park included Enos Mills from the Estes Park area, James Grafton Rogers from Denver, and J. Horace McFarland of Pennsylvania. The national park was established on January 26, 1915.

== Geography ==
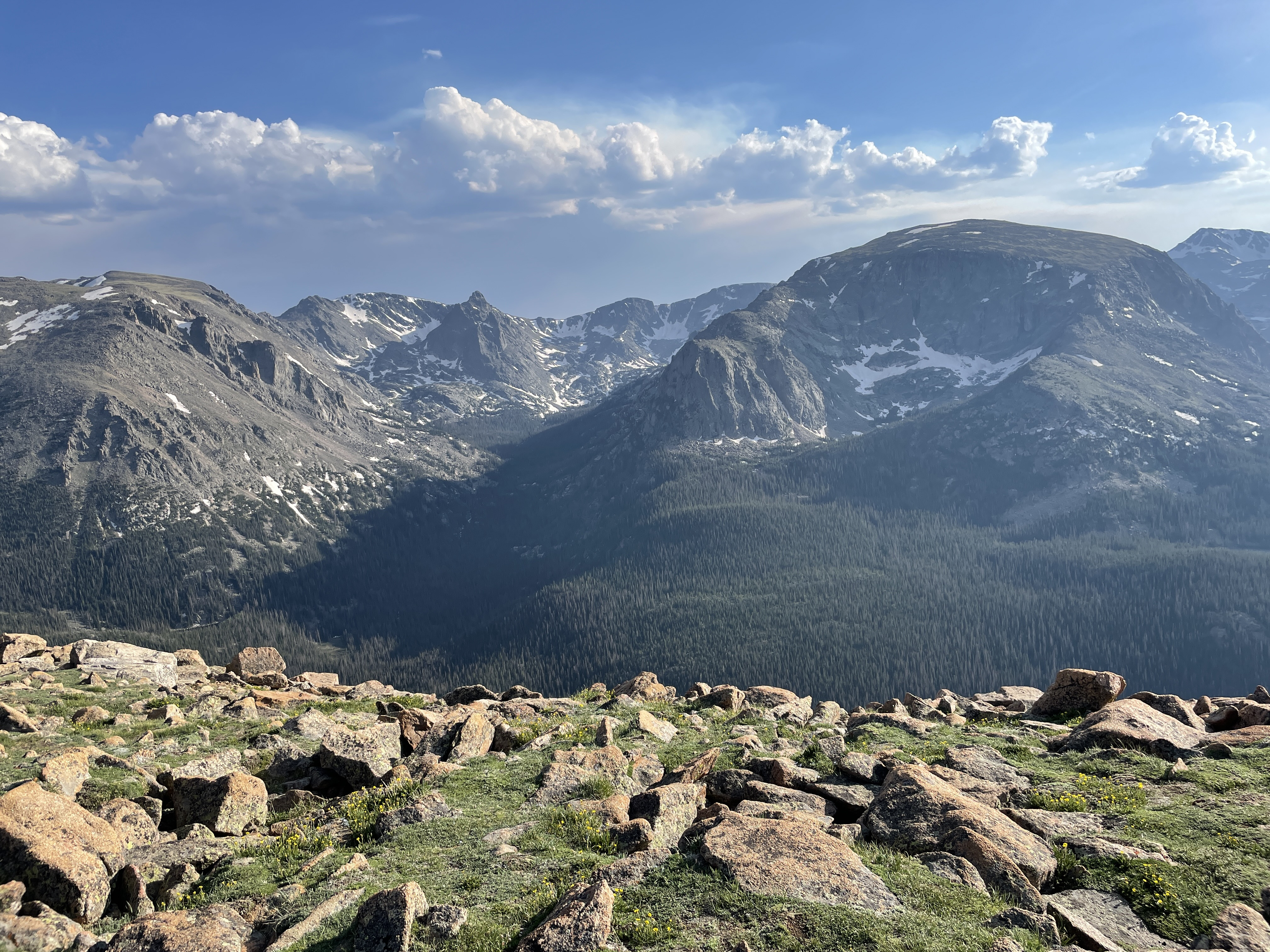
View from Forest Canyon Overlook along Trail Ridge Road

Rocky Mountain National Park encompasses 265,461 acres (414.78 sq mi; 1,074.28 km^{2}) of federal land, with an additional 253,059 acres (395.40 sq mi; 1,024.09 km^{2}) of U.S. Forest Service wilderness adjoining the park boundaries. The Continental Divide runs generally north–south through the center of the park, with rivers and streams on the western side of the divide flowing toward the Pacific Ocean while those on the eastern side flow toward the Atlantic.

A geographical anomaly is found along the slopes of the Never Summer Mountains where the Continental Divide forms a horseshoe–shaped bend for about 6 miles (9.7 km), heading from south–to–north but then curving sharply southward and westward out of the park. The sharp bend results in streams on the eastern slopes of the range joining the headwaters of the Colorado River that flow south and west, eventually reaching the Pacific. Meanwhile, streams on the western slopes join rivers that flow north and then east and south, eventually reaching the Gulf of Mexico.

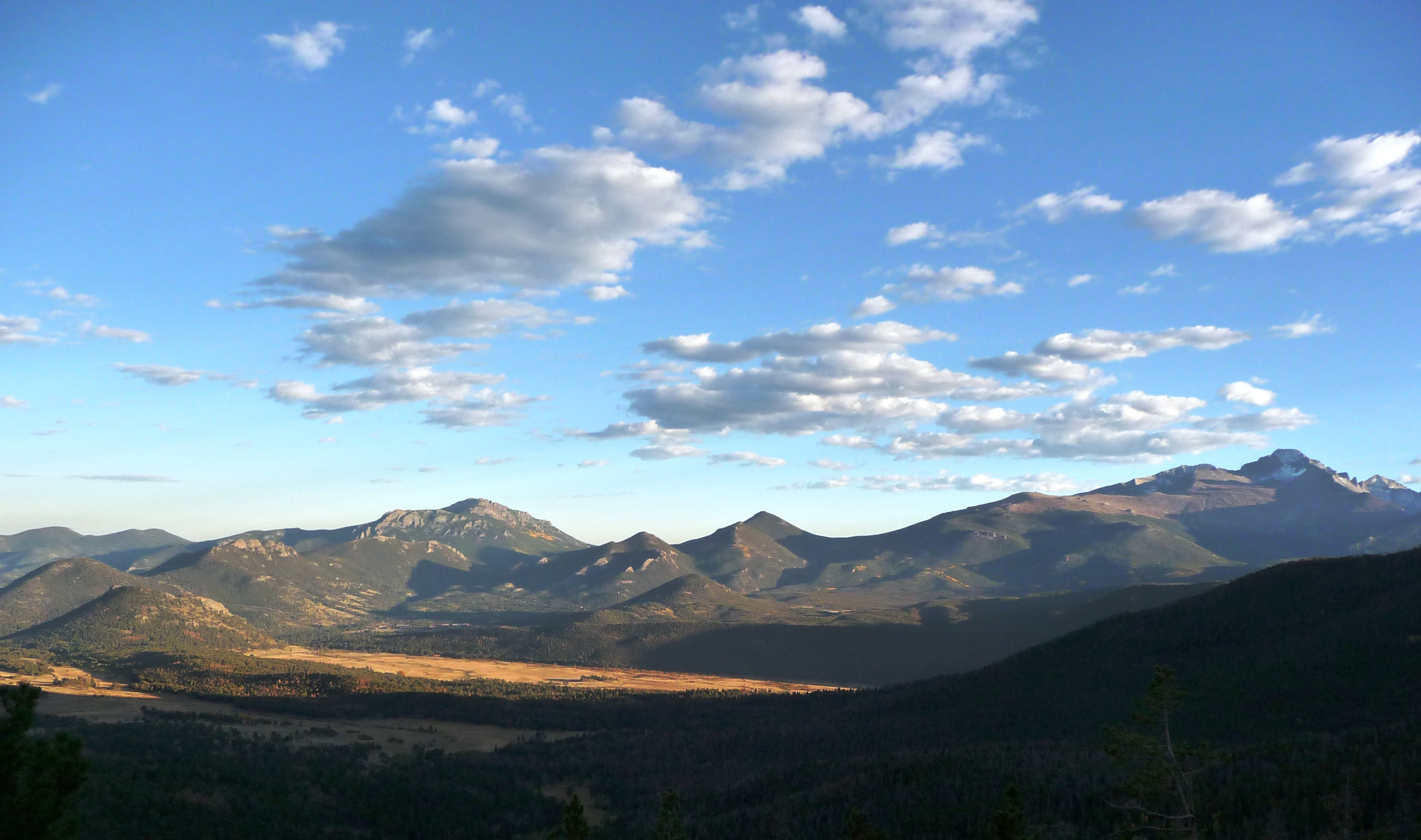
View from Many Parks Curve on Trail Ridge Road. The "parks" in the Rockies are meadows that formed when glacial lakes drained.

The headwaters of the Colorado River are located in the park's northwestern region. The park contains approximately 450 miles (724 km) of rivers and streams, 350 miles (563 km) of trails, and 150 lakes.

Rocky Mountain National Park is one of the highest national parks in the nation, with elevations from 7,860 to 14,259 feet (2,396 to 4,346 m), the highest point of which is Longs Peak. Sixty mountain peaks over 12,000 feet (3,658 m) high provide scenic vistas. On the north side of the park, the Mummy Range contains a number of thirteener peaks, including Hagues Peak, Mummy Mountain, Fairchild Mountain, Ypsilon Mountain, and Mount Chiquita. Several small glaciers and permanent snowfields are found in the high mountain cirques.

Baker Pass crosses the Continental Divide through the Never Summer Mountains and into the Michigan River drainage to the west of Mount Nimbus—a drainage that feeds streams and rivers that drain into the Gulf of Mexico. Other mountain passes are La Poudre Pass and Thunder Pass, which was once used by stage coaches and is a route to Michigan Lakes.

== Climate ==
According to the Köppen climate classification system, Rocky Mountain National Park has a Subarctic climate with cool summers and year around precipitation (Dfc). According to the United States Department of Agriculture, the Plant Hardiness zone at Bear Lake Ranger Station (9492 ft / 2893 m) is 5a with an average annual extreme minimum temperature of -15.2 °F (-26.2 °C), and 5a with an average annual extreme minimum temperature of -16.1 °F (-26.7 °C) at Beaver Meadows Visitor Center (7825 ft / 2385 m).

The complex interactions of elevation, slope, exposure and regional-scale air masses determine the climate within the park, which is noted for its extreme weather patterns. A "collision of air masses" from several directions produces some of the key weather events in the region. When cold arctic air from the north meets warm moist air from the Gulf of Mexico at the Front Range, "intense, very wet snowfalls with total snow depth measured in the feet" accumulate in the park.

Climate data for Bear Lake Ranger Station, Rocky Mountain National Park. Elev: 9583 ft (2921 m)
Month	Jan	Feb	Mar	Apr	May	Jun	Jul	Aug	Sep	Oct	Nov	Dec	Year
Mean daily maximum °F (°C)	28.6 (−1.9)	30.8 (−0.7)	37.5 (3.1)	44.1 (6.7)	53.2 (11.8)	63.7 (17.6)	70.7 (21.5)	68.6 (20.3)	60.7 (15.9)	49.2 (9.6)	36.0 (2.2)	28.3 (−2.1)	47.7 (8.7)
Daily mean °F (°C)	20.1 (−6.6)	21.2 (−6.0)	26.9 (−2.8)	33.0 (0.6)	41.5 (5.3)	50.5 (10.3)	56.9 (13.8)	55.4 (13.0)	48.2 (9.0)	38.6 (3.7)	27.4 (−2.6)	20.0 (−6.7)	36.7 (2.6)
Mean daily minimum °F (°C)	11.6 (−11.3)	11.7 (−11.3)	16.2 (−8.8)	21.8 (−5.7)	29.7 (−1.3)	37.2 (2.9)	43.0 (6.1)	42.1 (5.6)	35.6 (2.0)	28.0 (−2.2)	18.9 (−7.3)	11.6 (−11.3)	25.7 (−3.5)
Average precipitation inches (mm)	2.72 (69)	2.97 (75)	3.83 (97)	4.34 (110)	3.39 (86)	2.11 (54)	2.21 (56)	2.20 (56)	2.10 (53)	2.39 (61)	3.04 (77)	3.11 (79)	34.41 (874)
Average relative humidity (%)	56.5	56.4	54.3	54.3	55.2	50.1	48.6	54.2	50.0	47.2	52.5	57.3	53.0
Average dew point °F (°C)	7.1 (−13.8)	8.1 (−13.3)	12.6 (−10.8)	18.3 (−7.6)	26.6 (−3.0)	32.6 (0.3)	37.7 (3.2)	39.1 (3.9)	30.4 (−0.9)	20.2 (−6.6)	12.3 (−10.9)	7.3 (−13.7)	21.1 (−6.1)
Source: PRISM Climate Group

Climate data for Beaver Meadows Visitor Center, Rocky Mountain National Park. Elev: 7877 ft (2401 m)
Month	Jan	Feb	Mar	Apr	May	Jun	Jul	Aug	Sep	Oct	Nov	Dec	Year
Mean daily maximum °F (°C)	36.4 (2.4)	38.4 (3.6)	44.2 (6.8)	50.7 (10.4)	60.1 (15.6)	71.2 (21.8)	78.1 (25.6)	76.1 (24.5)	68.1 (20.1)	56.7 (13.7)	43.5 (6.4)	35.9 (2.2)	55.0 (12.8)
Daily mean °F (°C)	25.8 (−3.4)	26.9 (−2.8)	32.4 (0.2)	38.4 (3.6)	47.0 (8.3)	56.1 (13.4)	62.4 (16.9)	60.6 (15.9)	53.0 (11.7)	43.5 (6.4)	33.0 (0.6)	25.7 (−3.5)	42.1 (5.6)
Mean daily minimum °F (°C)	15.1 (−9.4)	15.5 (−9.2)	20.6 (−6.3)	26.1 (−3.3)	34.0 (1.1)	40.9 (4.9)	46.6 (8.1)	45.1 (7.3)	37.9 (3.3)	30.3 (−0.9)	22.6 (−5.2)	15.6 (−9.1)	29.3 (−1.5)
Average precipitation inches (mm)	0.76 (19)	0.81 (21)	1.94 (49)	2.36 (60)	2.48 (63)	1.99 (51)	2.39 (61)	2.02 (51)	1.46 (37)	1.04 (26)	0.87 (22)	0.83 (21)	18.95 (481)
Average relative humidity (%)	46.3	46.9	48.0	47.8	50.6	45.3	45.6	49.7	46.1	42.9	44.5	47.8	46.8
Average dew point °F (°C)	8.0 (−13.3)	9.3 (−12.6)	14.9 (−9.5)	20.3 (−6.5)	29.6 (−1.3)	35.2 (1.8)	41.1 (5.1)	41.7 (5.4)	32.8 (0.4)	22.4 (−5.3)	13.7 (−10.2)	8.6 (−13.0)	23.2 (−4.9)
Source: PRISM Climate Group

=== Elevation ===
Higher elevation areas within the park receive twice as much precipitation as lower elevation areas, generally in the form of deep winter snowfall. Arctic conditions are prevalent during the winter, with sudden blizzards, high winds, and deep snowpack. High country overnight trips require gear suitable for -35 °F or below.

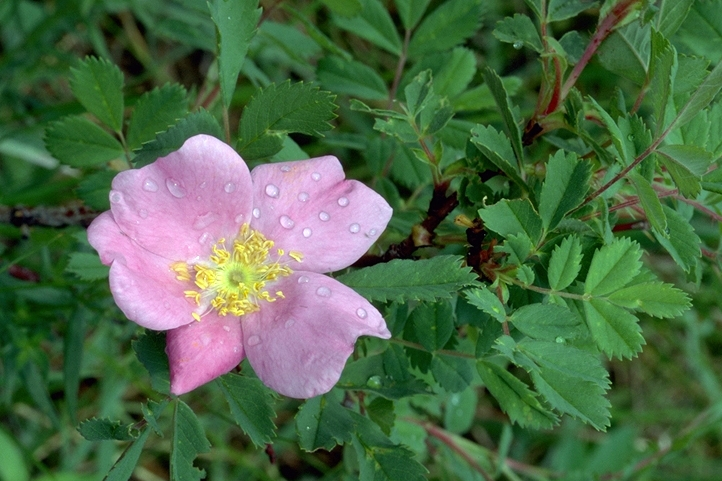
Wild roses (Rosa acicularis) bloom from montane to subalpine regions

The subalpine region does not begin to experience spring-like conditions until June. Wildflowers bloom from late June to early August.

Below 9,400 feet (2,865 m), temperatures are often moderate, although nighttime temperatures are cool, as is typical of mountain weather. Spring comes to the montane area by early May, when wildflowers begin to bloom. Spring weather is subject to unpredictable changes in temperature and precipitation, with potential for snow along trails through May. In July and August, temperatures are generally in the 70s or 80s °F during the day, and as low as the 40s °F at night. Lower elevations receive rain as most of their summer precipitation.

Sudden dramatic changes in the weather may occur during the summer, typically due to afternoon thunderstorms that can cause as much as a 20 °F drop in temperature and windy conditions.

=== Continental Divide ===
The park's climate is also affected by the Continental Divide, which runs northwest to southeast through the center of the park atop the high peaks. The Continental Divide creates two distinct climate patterns - one typical of the east side near Estes Park and the other associated with the Grand Lake area on the park's west side. The west side of the park experiences more snow, less wind, and clear cold days during the winter months.

=== Climate change study ===
Rocky Mountain National Park was selected to participate in a climate change study, along with two other National Park Service areas in the Rocky Mountain region and three in the Appalachian Mountain region. The study began in 2011, orchestrated by members of the academic scientific community in cooperation with the National Park Service and the National Aeronautics and Space Administration (NASA). The stated objective: "develop and apply decision support tools that use NASA and other data and models to assess vulnerability of ecosystems and species to climate and land use change and evaluate management options."

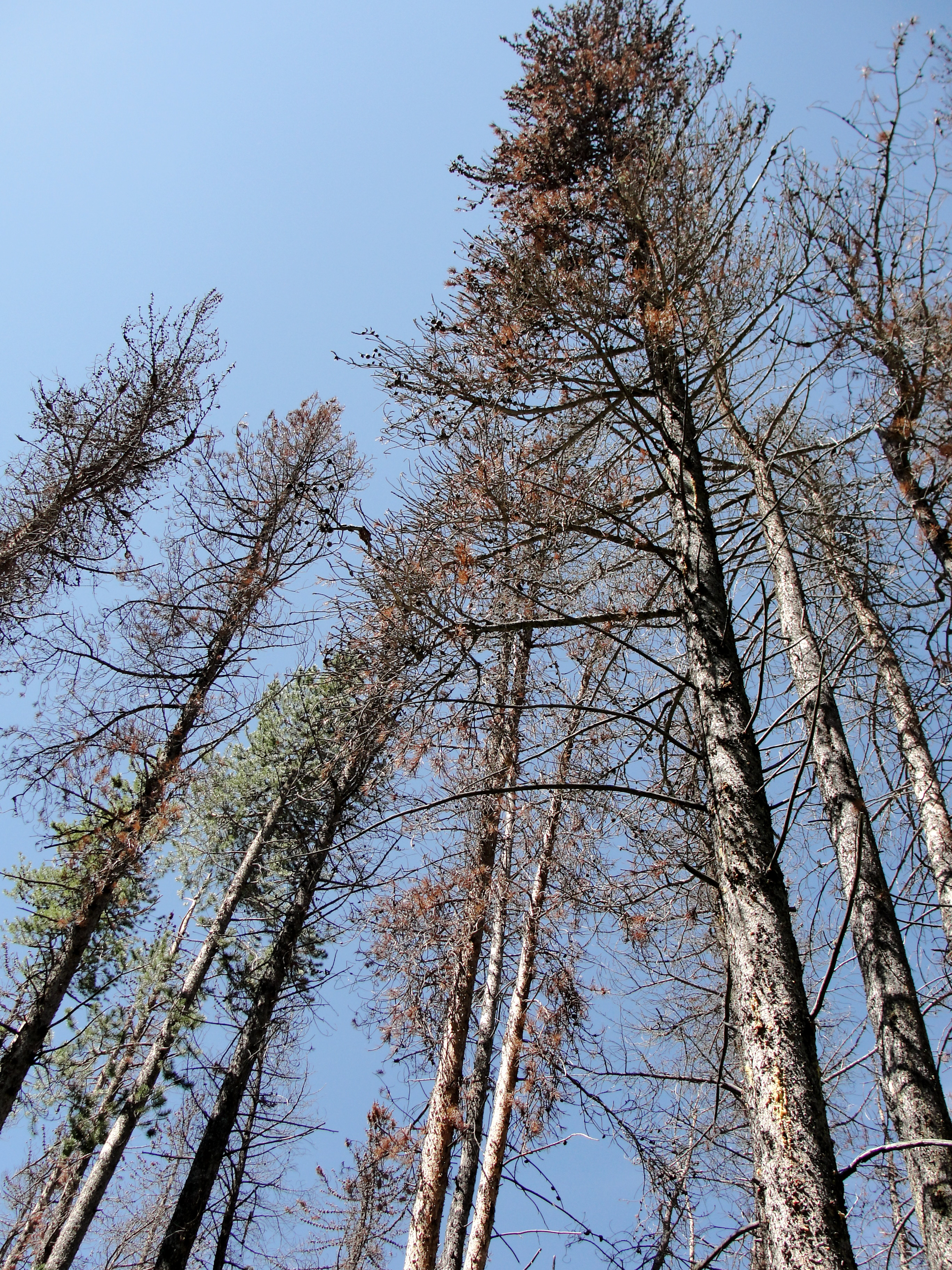
Trees killed by mountain pine beetles.

As of 2010, the preceding one hundred years of records indicated an increase in the average annual temperature of approximately 3 °F (1.7 °C). (Note: Montana State University states in their profile of Rocky Mountain National Park that there has been an increase of 2.5 °F (1.4 °C) in the average park temperature over "the past century" (charts show the period from about 1895 to 2010). The National Park Service site states that the increase has been 3.4 °F (1.9 °C) over "the last century" (chart shows the period from about 1905–2010).) The average low temperature has increased more than the average high temperature during the same time period. As a result of the temperature increase, snow is melting from the mountains earlier in the year, leading to drier summers and probably to an earlier, longer fire season. Since the 1990s, mountain pine beetles have reproduced more rapidly and have not died off at their previous mortality rate during the winter months. Consequently, the increased beetle population has led to an increased rate of tree mortality in the park.

The climate change study projects further temperature increases, with greater warming in the summer and higher extreme temperatures by 2050. Due to the increased temperature, there is a projected moderate increase in the rate of water evaporation. Reduced snowfall—perhaps 15% to 30% less than current amounts—and the elimination of surface hail, along with the higher likelihood of intense precipitation events are predicted by 2050. Droughts may be more likely due to increased temperatures, increased evaporation rates, and potential changes in precipitation.

== Geology ==
Precambrian metamorphic rock formed the core of the North American continent during the Precambrian eon 4.5–1 billion years ago. During the Paleozoic era, western North America was submerged beneath a shallow sea, with a seabed composed of limestone and dolomite deposits many kilometers thick. Pikes Peak granite formed during the late Precambrian eon, continuing well into the Paleozoic era, when mass quantities of molten rock flowed, amalgamated, and formed the continents about 1 billion–300 million years ago. Concurrently, in the period from 500 to 300 million years ago, the region began to sink while lime and mud sediments were deposited in the vacated space. Eroded granite produced sand particles that formed strata—layers of sediment—in the sinking basin.

About 300 million years ago, the land was uplifted creating the ancestral Rocky Mountains. Fountain Formation was deposited during the Pennsylvanian period of the Paleozoic era, 290–296 million years ago. Over the next 150 million years, the mountains uplifted, continued to erode, and covered themselves in their own sediment. Wind, gravity, rainwater, snow, and glacial ice eroded the granite mountains over geologic time scales. The Ancestral Rockies were eventually buried under subsequent strata.

The Western Interior Seaway 95 million years ago.

The Pierre Shale formation was deposited during the Paleogene and Cretaceous periods about 70 million years ago. The region was covered by a deep sea—the Cretaceous Western Interior Seaway—which deposited massive amounts of shale on the seabed. Both the thick stratum of shale and embedded marine life fossils—including ammonites and skeletons of fish and such marine reptiles as mosasaurs, plesiosaurs, and extinct species of sea turtles, along with rare dinosaur and bird remains—were created during this time period. The area now known as Colorado was eventually transformed from being at the bottom of an ocean to dry land again, giving yield to another fossiliferous rock layer known as the Denver Formation.

At about 68 million years ago, the Front Range began to rise again due to the Laramide orogeny in the west. During the Cenozoic era, block uplift formed the present Rocky Mountains. The geologic composition of Rocky Mountain National Park was also affected by deformation and erosion during that era. The uplift disrupted the older drainage patterns and created the present drainage patterns.

=== Glaciation ===
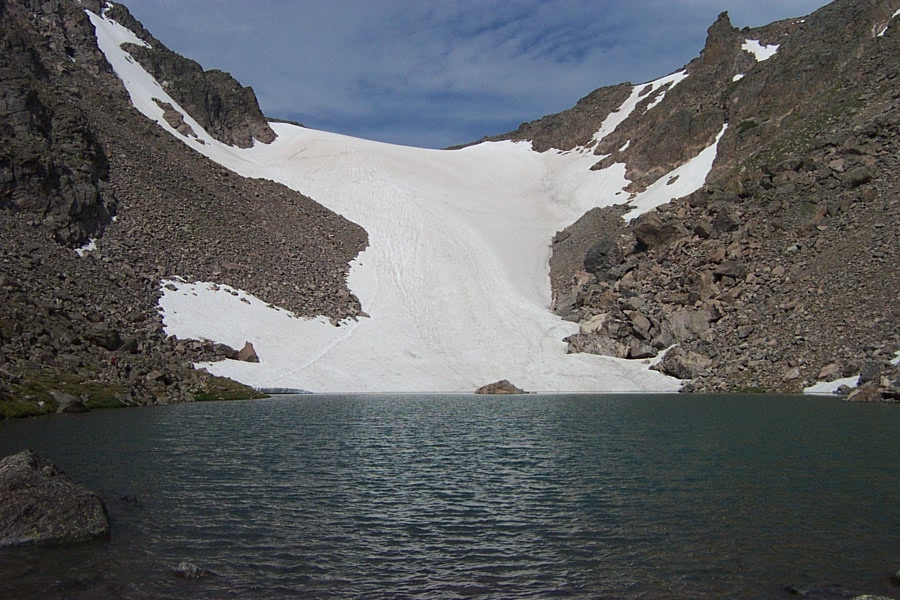
Andrews Glacier

Glacial geology in Rocky Mountain National Park can be seen from the mountain peaks to the valley floors. Ice is a powerful sculptor of this natural environment and large masses of moving ice are the most powerful tools. Telltale marks of giant glaciers can be seen all throughout the park. Streams and glaciations during the Quaternary period cut through the older sediment, creating mesa tops and alluvial plains, and revealing the present Rocky Mountains. The glaciation removed as much as 5,000 feet (1,500 m) of sedimentary rocks from earlier inland sea deposits. This erosion exposed the basement rock of the Ancestral Rockies. Evidence of the uplifting and erosion can be found on the way to Rocky Mountain National Park in the hogbacks of the Front Range foothills. Many sedimentary rocks from the Paleozoic and Mesozoic eras exist in the basins surrounding the park.

While the glaciation periods are largely in the past, the park still has several small glaciers. The glaciers include Andrews, Sprague, Tyndall, Taylor, Rowe, Mills, and Moomaw Glaciers.

=== Features ===
Little Yellowstone has geological features similar to the Grand Canyon of the Yellowstone.

The Mummy Range is a short mountain range in the north of the park. The Mummies tend to be gentler and more forested than the other peaks in the park, though some slopes are rugged and heavily glaciated, particularly around Ypsilon Mountain and Mummy Mountain.

Lumpy Ridge is a nunatak, an outcrop that was not eroded by glaciation, but rather by wind and chemistry. The granite of the ridge is 1.8 billion years old.

== Ecology ==
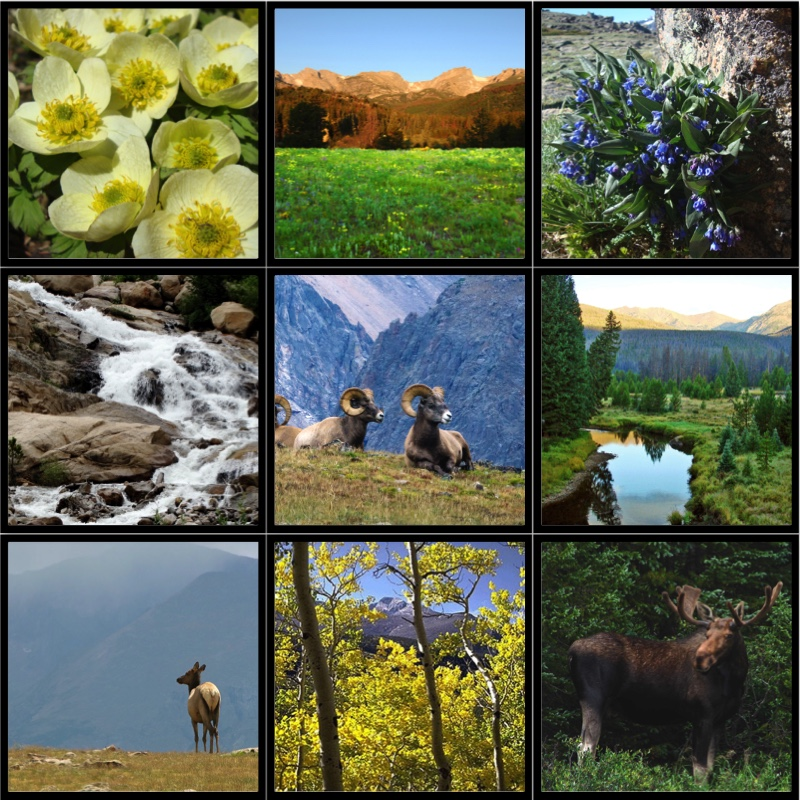
Clickable examples of ecosystem elements

According to the A. W. Kuchler U.S. Potential natural vegetation Types, Rocky Mountain National Park encompasses three classifications; an Alpine tundra & Barren (52) vegetation type with an Alpine tundra (11) vegetation form, a Western Spruce/Fir (15) vegetation type with a Rocky Mountain Conifer Forest (3) vegetation form, and a Pine/Douglas fir (18) vegetation type with a Rocky Mountain Conifer Forest (3) vegetation form.

Colorado has one of the most diverse plant and animal environments of the United States, partially due to the dramatic temperature differences arising from varying elevation levels and topography. In dry climates, the average temperature drops 5.4 degrees Fahrenheit with every 1,000 foot increase in elevation (9.8 degrees Celsius per 1,000 meters). Most of Colorado is semi-arid with the mountains receiving the greatest amount of precipitation in the state.

The Continental Divide runs north to south through the park, creating a climatic division. Ancient glaciers carved the topography into a range of ecological zones. The east side of the Divide tends to be drier with heavily glaciated peaks and cirques. The west side of the park is wetter with more lush, deep forests.

There are four ecosystems, or zones, in Rocky Mountain National Park: montane, subalpine, alpine tundra, and riparian. The riparian zone occurs throughout all of the three other zones. Each individual ecosystem is composed of organisms interacting with one other and with their surrounding environment. Living organisms (biotic), along with the dead organic matter they produce, and the abiotic (non-living) environment that impacts those living organisms (water, weather, rocks, and landscape) are all members of an ecosystem.

The park was designated a World Biosphere Reserve by the United Nations in 1976 to protect its natural resources. The park's biodiversity includes afforestation and reforestation, ecology, inland bodies of water, and mammals, while its ecosystems are managed for nature conservation, environmental education and public recreation purposes. The areas of research and monitoring include ungulate ecology and management, high-altitude revegetation, global change, acid precipitation effects, and aquatic ecology and management.

Despite the importance of preserving the park's natural environment, the area suffers air pollution impacts from Front Range activities, even as the impacts of Denver's infamous brown cloud have been reduced.

=== Montane zone ===
View from the Fall River Road illustrating the montane ecosystem with forested slopes and grassland in between

The montane ecosystem is at the lowest elevations in the park, between 5,600 to 9,500 feet (1,700 to 2,900 m), where the slopes and large meadow valleys support the widest range of plant and animal life, including montane forests, grasslands, and shrublands. The area has meandering rivers and during the summer, wildflowers grow in the open meadows. Ponderosa pine trees, grass, shrubs and herbs live on dry, south-facing slopes. North-facing slopes retain moisture better than those that face south. The soil better supports dense populations of trees, like Douglas fir, lodgepole pine, and ponderosa pine. There are also occasional Engelmann spruce and blue spruce trees. Quaking aspens thrive in high-moisture montane soils. Other water-loving small trees like willows, grey alder, and water birch may be found along streams or lakeshores. Water-logged soil in flat montane valleys may be unable to support growth of evergreen forests. The following areas are part of the montane ecosystem: Moraine Park, Horseshoe Park, Kawuneeche Valley, and Upper Beaver Meadows.

Some of the mammals that inhabit the montane ecosystem include snowshoe hares, coyotes, cougars, beavers, mule deer, moose, bighorn sheep, black bears, and Rocky Mountain elk. During the fall, visitors often flock to the park to witness the elk rut.

=== Subalpine zone ===
From 9,000 ft (2,700 m) to 11,000 ft (3,400 m), the montane forests give way to subalpine forests. Forests of fir and Engelmann spruce cover the mountainsides in subalpine areas. Trees grow straight and tall in the lower subalpine forests, but become shorter and more deformed the nearer they are to the tree line. At the tree line, seedlings may germinate on the lee side of rocks and grow only as high as the rock provides wind protection, with any further growth being more horizontal than vertical. The low growth of dense trees is called krummholz, which may become well-established and live for several hundred to a thousand years old.

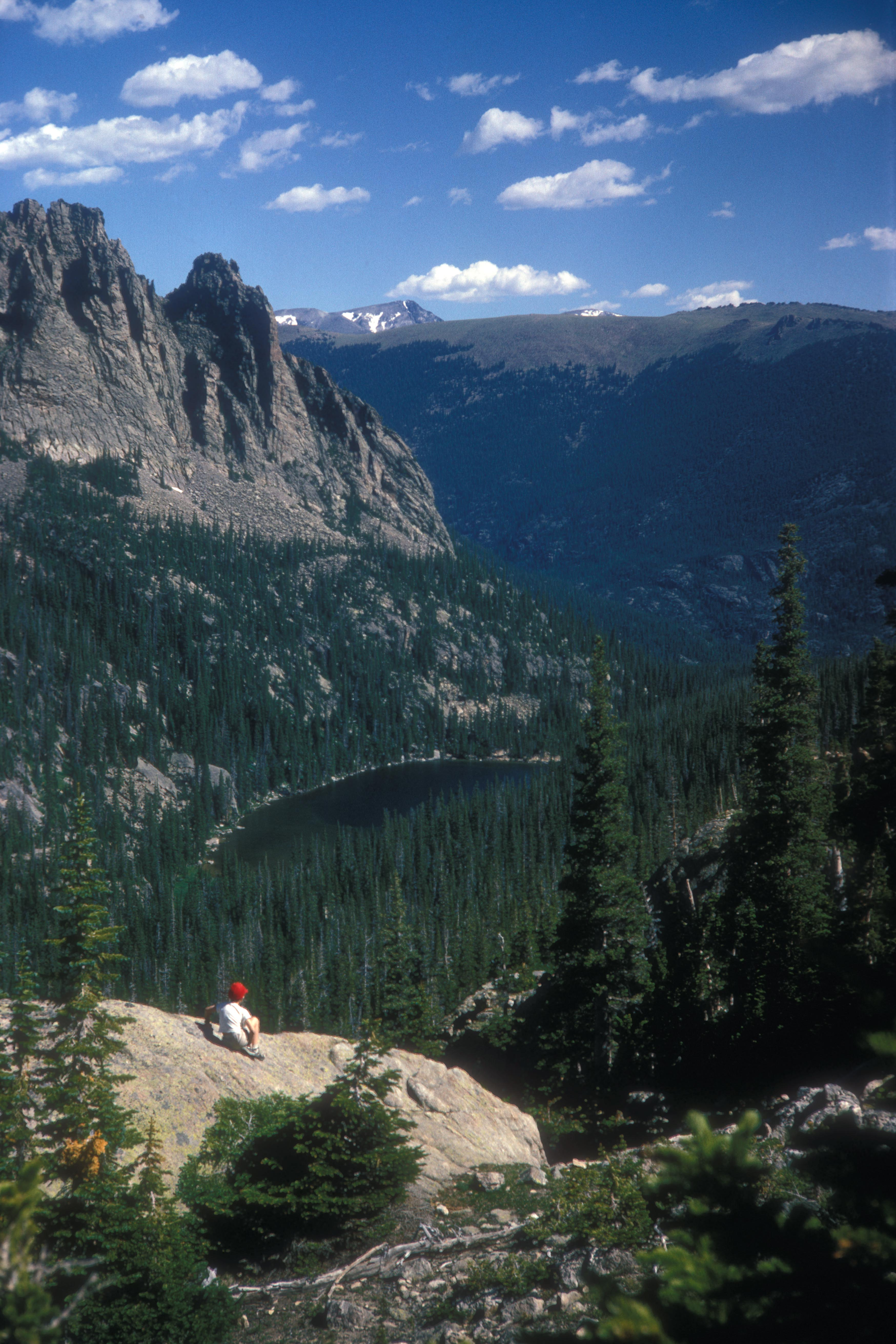
Odessa Lake in the subalpine ecosystem

In the subalpine zone, lodgepole pines and huckleberry have established themselves in previous burn areas. Crystal clear lakes and fields of wildflowers are hidden among the trees. Mammals of the subalpine zone include bobcats, cougars, coyotes, elk, mule deer, chipmunks, shrews, porcupines and yellow-bellied marmots. Black bears are attracted by the berries and seeds of subalpine forests. Clark's nutcracker, Steller's jay, mountain chickadee and yellow-rumped warbler are some of the many birds found in the subalpine zone. Sprague Lake and Odessa Lake are two of the park's subalpine lakes.

=== Alpine tundra ===
Above tree line, at approximately 11,000 ft (3,400 m), trees disappear and the vast alpine tundra takes over. Over one third of the park resides above the tree line, an area which limits plant growth due to the cold climate and strong winds. The few plants that can survive under such extreme conditions are mostly perennials. Many alpine plants are dwarfed at high elevations, though their occasional blossoms may be full-sized.

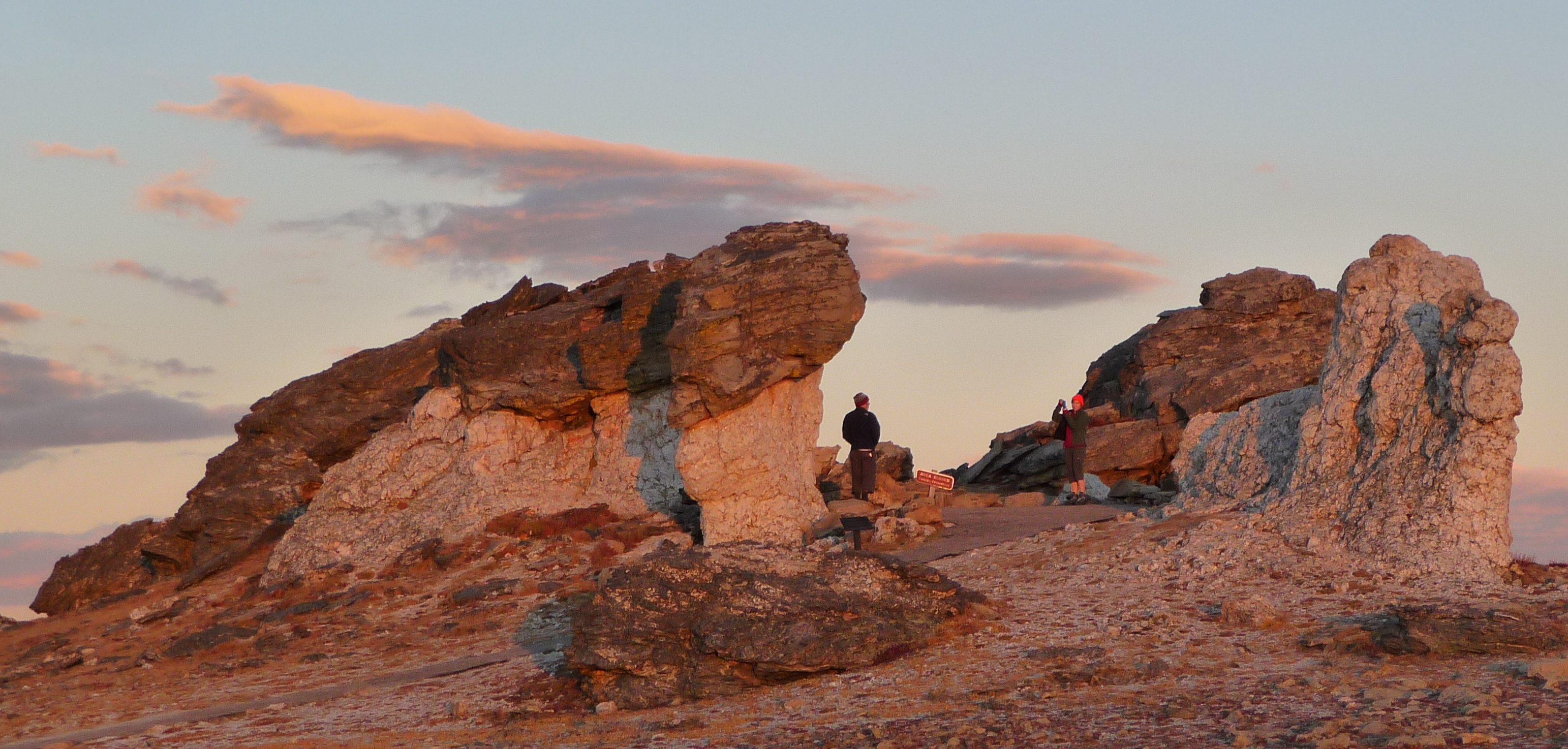
View on Tundra Communities Trail

Cushion plants have long taproots that extend deep into the rocky soil. Their diminutive size, like clumps of moss, limits the effect of harsh winds. Many flowering plants of the tundra have dense hairs on stems and leaves to provide wind protection or red-colored pigments capable of converting the sun's light rays into heat. Some plants take two or more years to form flower buds, which survive the winter below the surface and then open and produce fruit with seeds in the few weeks of summer. Grasses and sedges are common where tundra soil is well-developed.

Non-flowering lichens cling to rocks and soil. Their enclosed algal cells can photosynthesize at any temperature above 32 degrees Fahrenheit (0 °C), and the outer fungal layers can absorb more than their own weight in water. Adaptations for survival amidst drying winds and cold temperatures may make tundra vegetation seem very hardy, but in some respects it remains very fragile. Footsteps can destroy tundra plants and it may take hundreds of years to recover. Mammals that live on the alpine tundra, or visit during the summer season, include bighorn sheep, elk, badgers, pikas, yellow-bellied marmots, and snowshoe hares. Birds include prairie falcons, white-tailed ptarmigans, and common ravens. Flowering plants include mertensia, sky pilot, alpine sunflowers, alpine dwarf columbine, and alpine forget-me-not. Grasses include kobresia, spike trisetum, spreading wheatgrass, and tufted hairgrass.

=== Riparian zone ===
Mountain stream along Fall River Road is an example of a riparian ecosystem.

The riparian ecosystem runs through the montane, subalpine, and alpine tundra zones and creates a foundation for life, especially for species that thrive next to streams, rivers, and lakes. The headwaters of the Colorado River, which provides water to many of the southwestern states, are located on the west side of the park. The Fall River, Cache la Poudre River and Big Thompson Rivers are located on the east side of the park. Just like the other ecosystems in the park, the riparian zone is affected by the climatic variables of temperature, precipitation, and elevation. Generally, riparian zones in valleys will have cooler temperatures than communities located on slopes and ridge tops. Depending on elevation, a riparian zone may have more or less precipitation than other riparian zones in the park, with the difference creating a shift in the types of plants and animals found in a specific zone.

=== Wildlife ===
Rocky Mountain National Park is home to many species of animals, including nearly seventy mammals and almost three hundred species of birds. This diversity is due to the park's varying topography, which creates a variety of habitats. However, some species have been extirpated from the park, including gray wolf, wolverine, grizzly bear, and American bison. Moose are commonly seen in the park, but they were not historically recorded as being part of this particular area of the Rocky Mountains.

==== Elk ====
The park is home to some 2,000 to 3,000 elk in summer, and between 800 and 1,000 elk spend the winter within its boundaries. Because of lack of predators such as wolves, the National Park Service culls around 50 elk each winter. Overgrazing by elk has become a major problem in the park's riparian areas, so much so that the NPS fences them out of many critical wetland habitats to let willows and aspens grow. The program seems to be working, as the deciduous wetland plants thrive within the fencing. Many people think the elk herd is too large, but are reluctant to reintroduce predators because of its proximity to large human populations and ranches.

==== Other ungulates ====
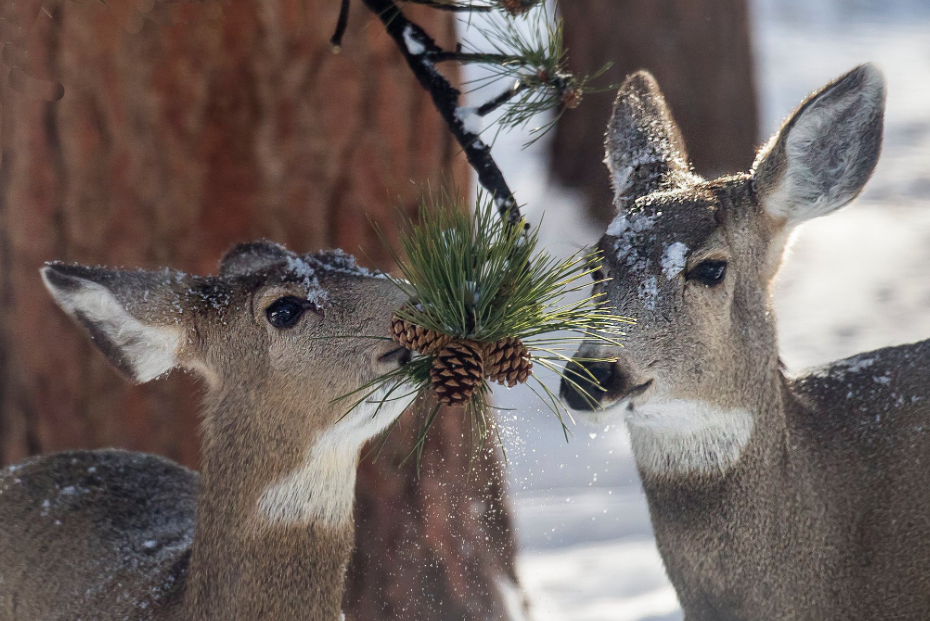
Mule deer investigating some pinecones.

Many other ungulates reside in the park, including bighorn sheep, moose, and mule deer. Bison were eliminated from the park in the 1800s, as were pronghorn and moose, the latter of which was restored to the area in 1978. Moose are now frequently seen in the park, especially on the park's west side. The park's bighorn sheep population has recovered and is estimated at 350 animals.

==== Predators ====
The park is home to many predatory animals, including Canada lynx, foxes, bobcat, cougar, black bear, and coyotes. Wolves and grizzly bears were extirpated in the early 1900s. Most of these predators kill smaller animals, but mountain lions and coyotes kill deer and occasionally elk. Bears also eat larger prey. Moose have no predators in the park. Black bears are relatively uncommon in the park, numbering only 24–35 animals. They also have fewer cubs and the bears seem skinnier than they do in most areas. Canadian lynx are quite rare within the park, and they have probably spread north from the San Juan Mountains, where they were reintroduced in 1999. Cougars feed mainly on mule deer in the park, and live 10–13 years. Cougar territories can be as large as 500 square miles (1,300 km^{2}). Coyotes hunt both alone and in pairs, but occasionally hunt in packs. They mainly feed on rodents but occasionally bring down larger animals, including deer, and especially fawns and elk calves. Scat studies in Moraine Park showed that their primary foods were deer and rodents. They form strong family bonds and are very vocal.

== Access and activities ==
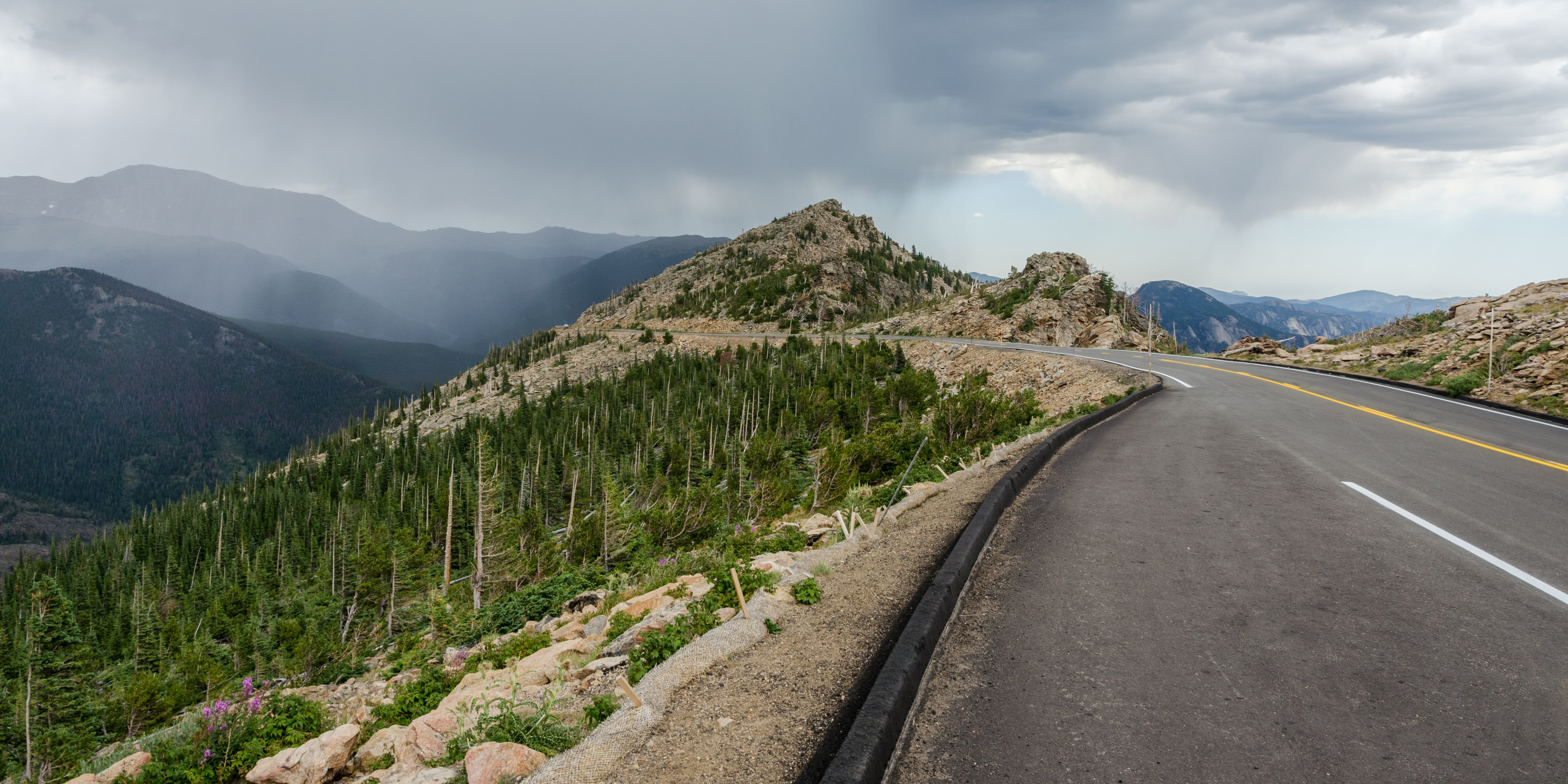
Trail Ridge Road is the highest continuously paved highway in the United States.

The park has four entrances: three on the east side near Estes Park and one in the west near Grand Lake. Approximately 3 million people enter the park per year. In addition, the park has five visitor centers. To address crowding, the park implemented a timed-entry system beginning in 2020: from May to October most visitors must have a reservation to enter the park.

Trail Ridge Road, also known as U.S. Route 34, connects the eastern and western sides of the park. The road is the highest continuously paved highway in the country, with a summit elevation of 12,183 feet (3,713 m). During the winter most of Trail Ridge Road is closed due to heavy snow, limiting motorized access to the edges of the park.

The park contains a network of trails. Most trails are for summer use only, since at other times of the year many trails are not safe due to weather conditions.

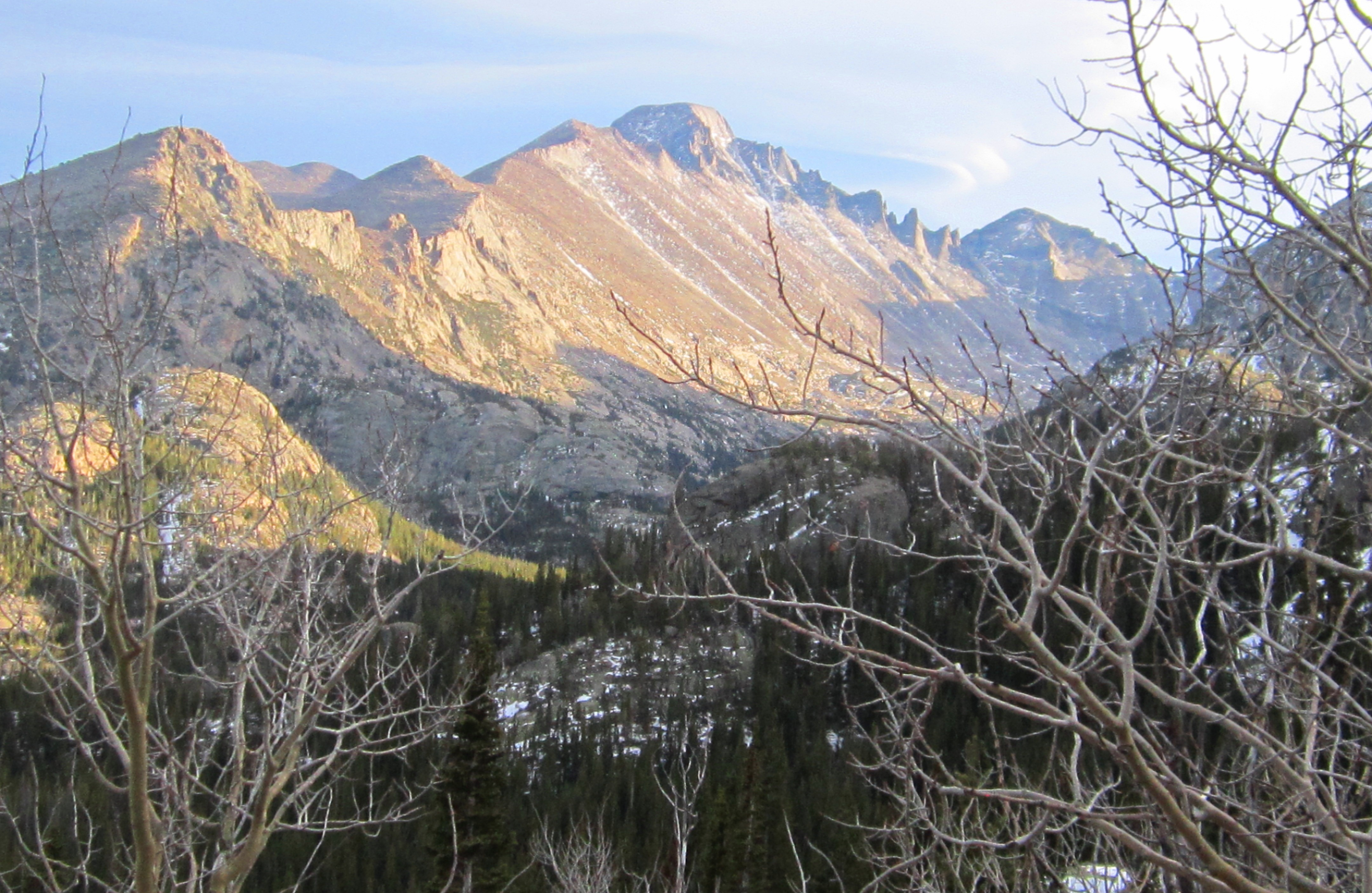
Longs Peak seen from Dream Lake trail

Fishing is permitted at many of the park's lakes and streams. Four trout species inhabit park waters: rainbow, brook, cutthroat, and German brown trout.

Other activities available in the park include rock climbing, mountaineering, snowshoeing and cross-country skiing.

== Hazards ==
Encountering bears is a concern in much of the Rocky Mountains, including the Wind River Range. There are other concerns as well, including bugs, wildfires, adverse snow conditions and nighttime cold temperatures.

There have been notable incidents, including accidental deaths, due to falls from steep cliffs (a misstep could be fatal in this class 4/5 terrain) and due to falling rocks, over the years, including 1993, 2007 (involving an experienced NOLS leader), 2015 and 2018. Other incidents include a seriously injured backpacker being airlifted near SquareTop Mountain in 2005. According to data from the National Park Service, there have been 77 fatalities at the park between 2007 and 2024, the majority of which were from accidental falls while hiking or climbing.

=== Wildfires ===
Wildfires have been recorded in Rocky Mountain National Park prior to its establishment in 1915. Some of the most notable wildfires include the Bear Lake Fire, which was started by a campfire that was not properly put out, and burned for two months in 1900. The Ouzel Fire in 1978 was caused naturally by lightning and was allowed to burn under supervision until it grew out of control and in total burned 1,050 acres of land. The Fern Lake Fire in 2012 was also caused by a campfire, the fire was intensified due to strong winds and drought in the area. Absence of fire in around Fern Lake for many centuries caused excessive dead trees and a thick layer of organic matter on the ground which fueled the fire, ultimately leading to it lasting for over two months and burning nearly 3,500 acres of land.

An increase in average temperature in the Rocky Mountain region has been correlated to a decrease in snowfall that melts earlier in the year, attributing to drier summers and longer fire seasons. Rocky Mountain National Park is expected to see one of the largest increases in number of wildfires for the United States, with an increase in both duration and intensity for wildfires in general across the nation.

Wildfires that have a higher burn severity can cause serious damage to an ecosystem. High-severity wildfires can cause soil degradation by affecting the soils’ ability to absorb and process water. They also cause an increase in erosion due to burning away vegetation that holds the soil to the ground, thus increasing the chances of flooding and mudslides that cause further damage in and around the affected areas. Ash from the fires also contributes significantly to air and water pollution.

Low-severity wildfires however are crucial to maintaining a balanced ecosystem and can help prevent the damaging high-severity wildfires by clearing away excess organic material that adds fuel to and amplifies the spread of more severe wildfires. While severe fires can negatively impact the soil, less severe wildfires can be beneficial as burning the nutrient-rich dead organic material helps to fertilize the soil. The smaller fires also clear room for new growth and can fight against invasive species encroachment in the park.

Many parks including Rocky Mountain National Park use small fires as means to prevent more severe fires from getting out of hand. Along with small, prescribed burns, other fuel management practices include removing low hanging branches and forest thinning in general. Scientists have been working hard to find a balance in wildfires, allowing them to work as a restorative ecological process while avoiding the damage and pollution that come with high-severity wildfires.

== See also ==
- List of national parks of the United States
- List of areas in the United States National Park System – parks, monuments, preserves, historic sites, etc.
- Birds of Rocky Mountain National Park
- Southern Rocky Mountain Front - where the Rocky Mountains meet the plains

== Sources ==
- Buchholtz, C. W. (1983). Rocky Mountain National Park: A History. University Press of Colorado. ISBN 0-87081-146-0.
- Buckley, Jay H.; Nokes, Jeffery D. (March 28, 2016). Explorers of the American West: Mapping the World through Primary Documents. ABC-CLIO. ISBN 978-1-61069-732-3.
- Frank, Jerry J. (2013). Making Rocky Mountain National Park: The Environmental History of an American Treasure.
- Law, Amy (March 16, 2015). Natural History of Trail Ridge Road: A Rocky Mountain National Park's Highway to the Sky. Arcadia Publishing. ISBN 978-1-62619-935-4.
- Perry, Phyllis J. (2008). Rocky Mountain National Park. Arcadia Publishing. ISBN 978-0-7385-5627-7.
- U.S. Corps of Topographical Engineers. "Stephen Harriman Long, Topographical Engineers". U.S. Corps of Topographical Engineers. Archived from the original on December 4, 2010.
