= Fairchild Mountain =

Mountain in Colorado, United States

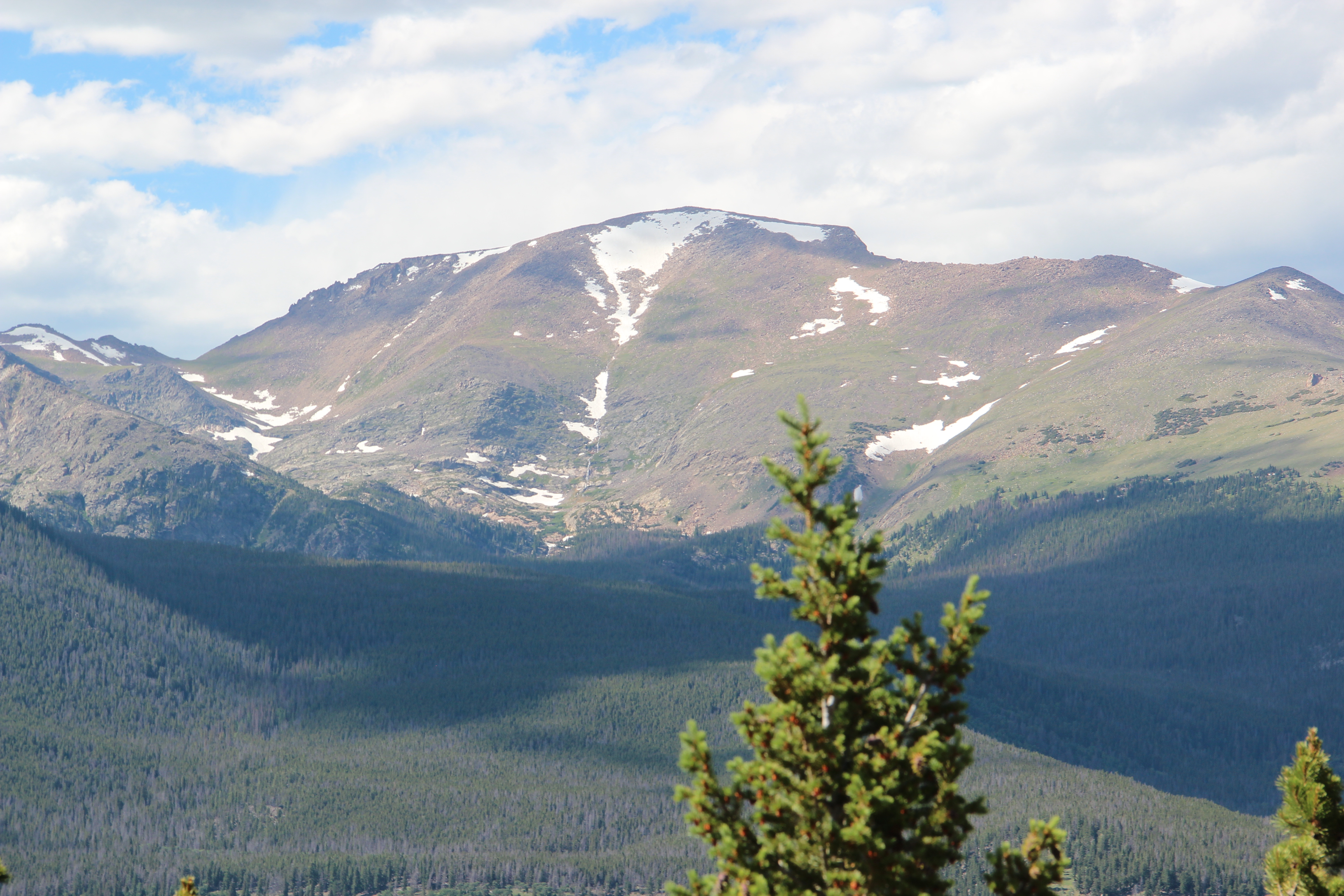
- Fairchild Mountain, viewed from Trail Ridge Road

Highest point
- Elevation: 13,508 ft (4,117 m)
- Prominence: 922 ft (281 m)
- Parent peak: Ypsilon Mountain
- Isolation: 1.19 mi (1.92 km)
- Coordinates: 40°28′06″N 105°39′51″W

Naming
- Etymology: Lucius Fairchild

Geography
- Location within Colorado
- Location: Rocky Mountain National Park, Larimer County, Colorado, U.S.
- Parent range: Mummy Range
- Topo map(s): USGS 7.5' topographic map Trail Ridge, Colorado

Fairchild Mountain is a high mountain summit in the Mummy Range of the Rocky Mountains of North America. The 13,508-foot (4,117 m) thirteener is located in the Rocky Mountain National Park Wilderness, 9.6 miles (15.5 km) northwest (bearing 311°) of the Town of Estes Park in Larimer County, Colorado, United States. The mountain was named after Lucius Fairchild, an American Civil War veteran who had served as Governor of Wisconsin and U.S. Minister to Spain.

== Climate ==
ET (tundra).

Climate data for Fairchild Mountain 40.4689 N, 105.6679 W, Elevation: 13,287 ft (4,050 m) (1991–2020 normals)
Month	Jan	Feb	Mar	Apr	May	Jun	Jul	Aug	Sep	Oct	Nov	Dec	Year
Mean daily maximum °F (°C)	19.8 (−6.8)	19.1 (−7.2)	24.7 (−4.1)	30.1 (−1.1)	39.7 (4.3)	51.6 (10.9)	57.4 (14.1)	55.5 (13.1)	48.9 (9.4)	37.6 (3.1)	26.3 (−3.2)	20.1 (−6.6)	35.9 (2.2)
Daily mean °F (°C)	9.1 (−12.7)	8.1 (−13.3)	13.3 (−10.4)	18.4 (−7.6)	27.5 (−2.5)	38.5 (3.6)	44.8 (7.1)	43.1 (6.2)	36.5 (2.5)	26.0 (−3.3)	16.2 (−8.8)	9.7 (−12.4)	24.3 (−4.3)
Mean daily minimum °F (°C)	−1.6 (−18.7)	−2.8 (−19.3)	2.0 (−16.7)	6.6 (−14.1)	15.4 (−9.2)	25.4 (−3.7)	32.2 (0.1)	30.8 (−0.7)	24.2 (−4.3)	14.4 (−9.8)	6.1 (−14.4)	−0.6 (−18.1)	12.7 (−10.7)
Average precipitation inches (mm)	4.53 (115)	4.67 (119)	4.34 (110)	5.10 (130)	4.31 (109)	1.92 (49)	2.30 (58)	2.53 (64)	2.28 (58)	2.91 (74)	3.94 (100)	4.29 (109)	43.12 (1,095)
Source: PRISM Climate Group

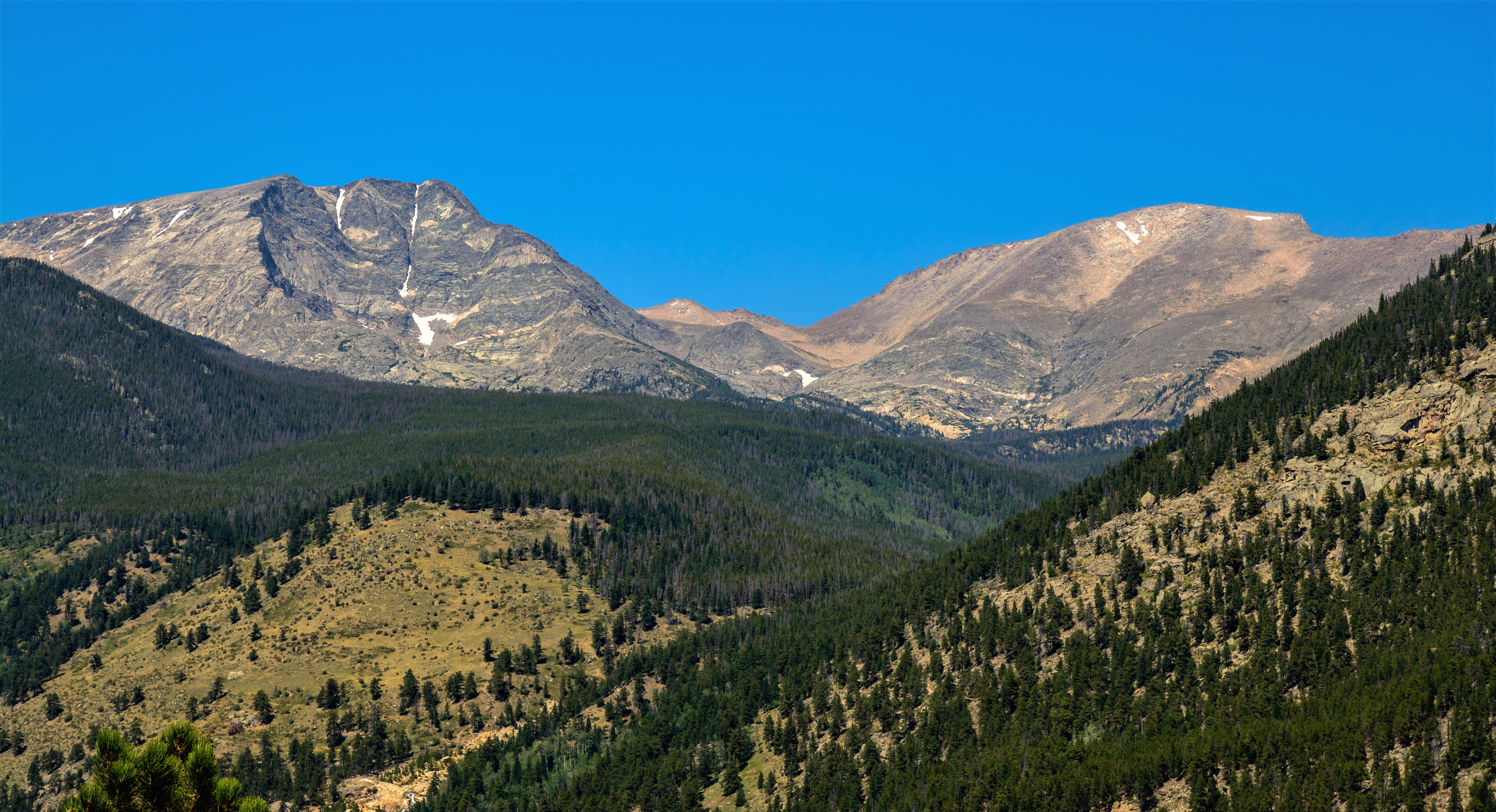
Ypsilon Mountain (left), Fairchild Mountain (right)

== See also ==
- List of Colorado mountain ranges
- List of Colorado mountain summits
  - List of Colorado fourteeners
  - List of Colorado 4000 meter prominent summits
  - List of the most prominent summits of Colorado
- List of Colorado county high points
