= Mummy Mountain (Colorado) =

Mountain in Colorado, United States

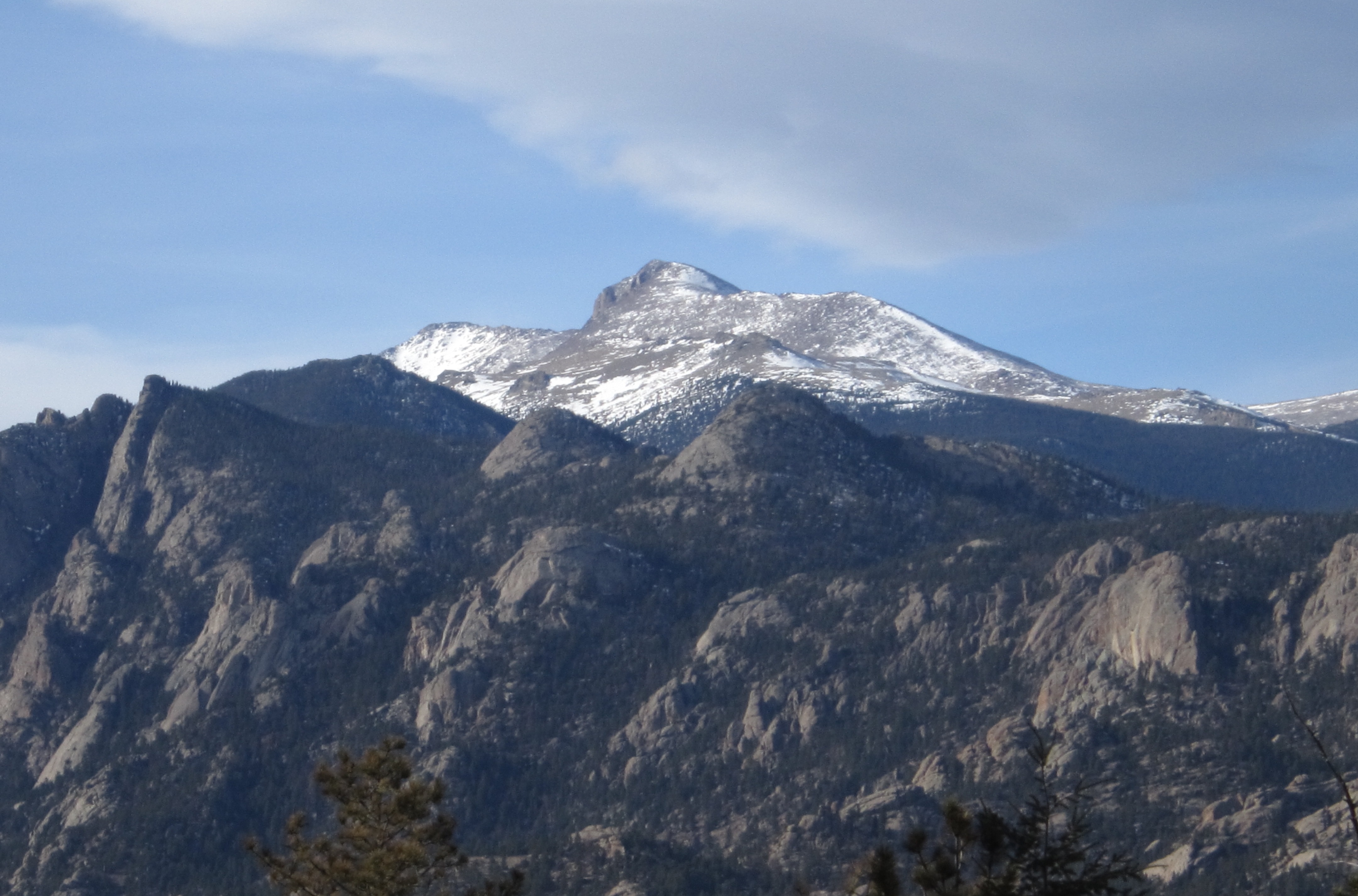
- Mummy Mountain from Estes Park, Colorado.

Highest point
- Elevation: 13,430 ft (4,093 m)
- Prominence: 485 ft (148 m)
- Isolation: 1.37 mi (2.20 km)
- Coordinates: 40°28′30″N 105°37′25″W

Geography
- Location within Colorado
- Location: Larimer County Colorado, U.S.
- Parent range: Mummy Range
- Topo map(s): USGS 7.5' topographic map Estes Park, Colorado

Climbing
- Easiest route: hike

Mummy Mountain is a high mountain summit in the Mummy Range of the Rocky Mountains of North America. The 13,430-foot (4,093 m) thirteener is located in the Rocky Mountain National Park, 8.5 miles (13.7 km) northwest by north (bearing 323°) of the Town of Estes Park in Larimer County, Colorado, United States.

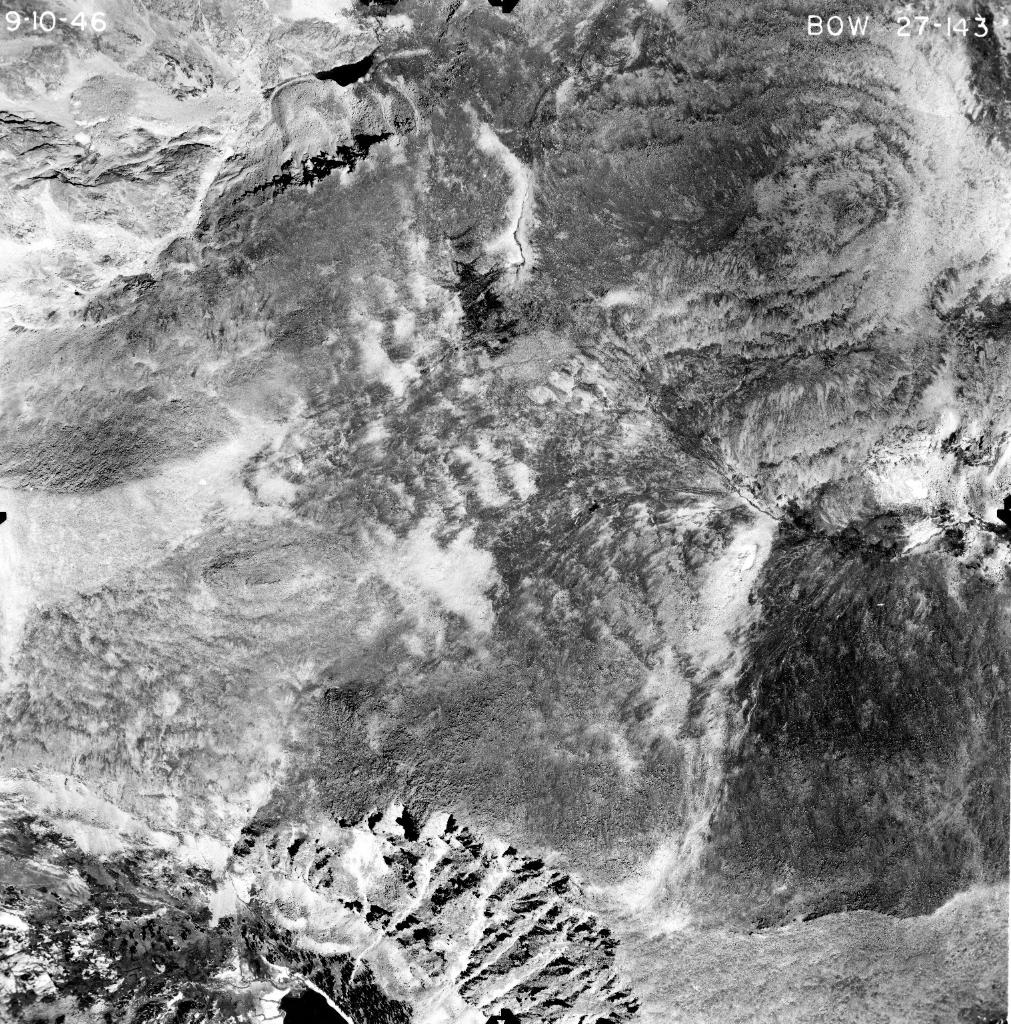
Mummy Mountain (bottom), photographed by the United States Forest Service in 1946.

== Climate ==
Climate data for Mummy Mountain 40.2521 N, 105.6082 W, Elevation: 13,350 ft (4,069 m) (1991–2020 normals)
Month	Jan	Feb	Mar	Apr	May	Jun	Jul	Aug	Sep	Oct	Nov	Dec	Year
Mean daily maximum °F (°C)	20.6 (−6.3)	20.0 (−6.7)	25.2 (−3.8)	29.1 (−1.6)	38.3 (3.5)	50.0 (10.0)	55.9 (13.3)	54.1 (12.3)	47.6 (8.7)	35.9 (2.2)	27.1 (−2.7)	20.9 (−6.2)	35.4 (1.9)
Daily mean °F (°C)	9.4 (−12.6)	8.5 (−13.1)	13.3 (−10.4)	17.5 (−8.1)	26.5 (−3.1)	37.2 (2.9)	43.5 (6.4)	41.9 (5.5)	35.5 (1.9)	24.9 (−3.9)	16.5 (−8.6)	10.1 (−12.2)	23.7 (−4.6)
Mean daily minimum °F (°C)	−1.7 (−18.7)	−3.0 (−19.4)	1.4 (−17.0)	6.0 (−14.4)	14.7 (−9.6)	24.4 (−4.2)	31.0 (−0.6)	29.7 (−1.3)	23.4 (−4.8)	13.9 (−10.1)	6.0 (−14.4)	−0.6 (−18.1)	12.1 (−11.0)
Average precipitation inches (mm)	3.09 (78)	3.25 (83)	3.81 (97)	4.95 (126)	4.00 (102)	2.18 (55)	2.73 (69)	2.60 (66)	2.59 (66)	2.71 (69)	3.07 (78)	3.03 (77)	38.01 (966)
Source: PRISM Climate Group

== Gallery ==
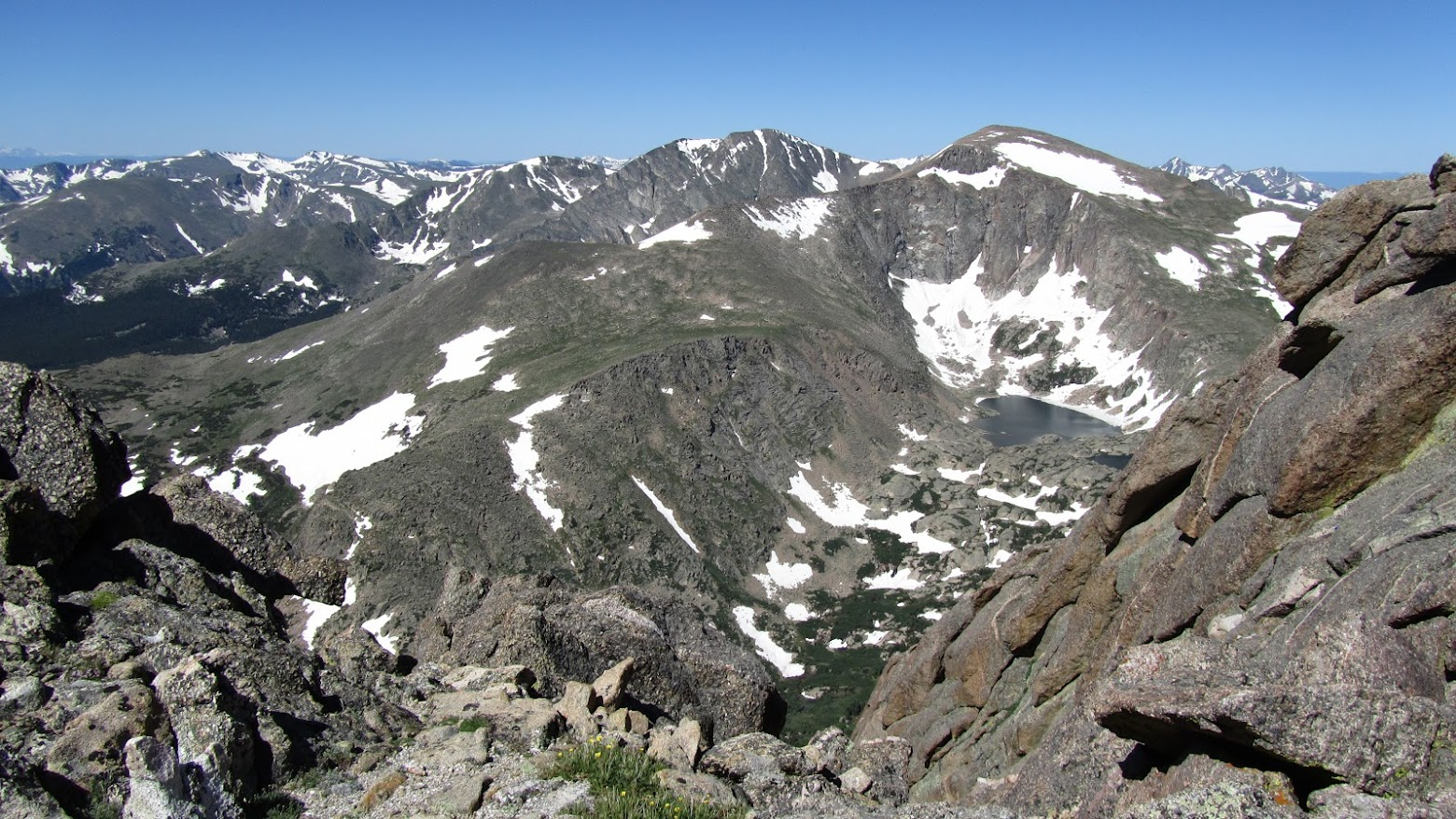
Mummy Mountain View From Near Summit

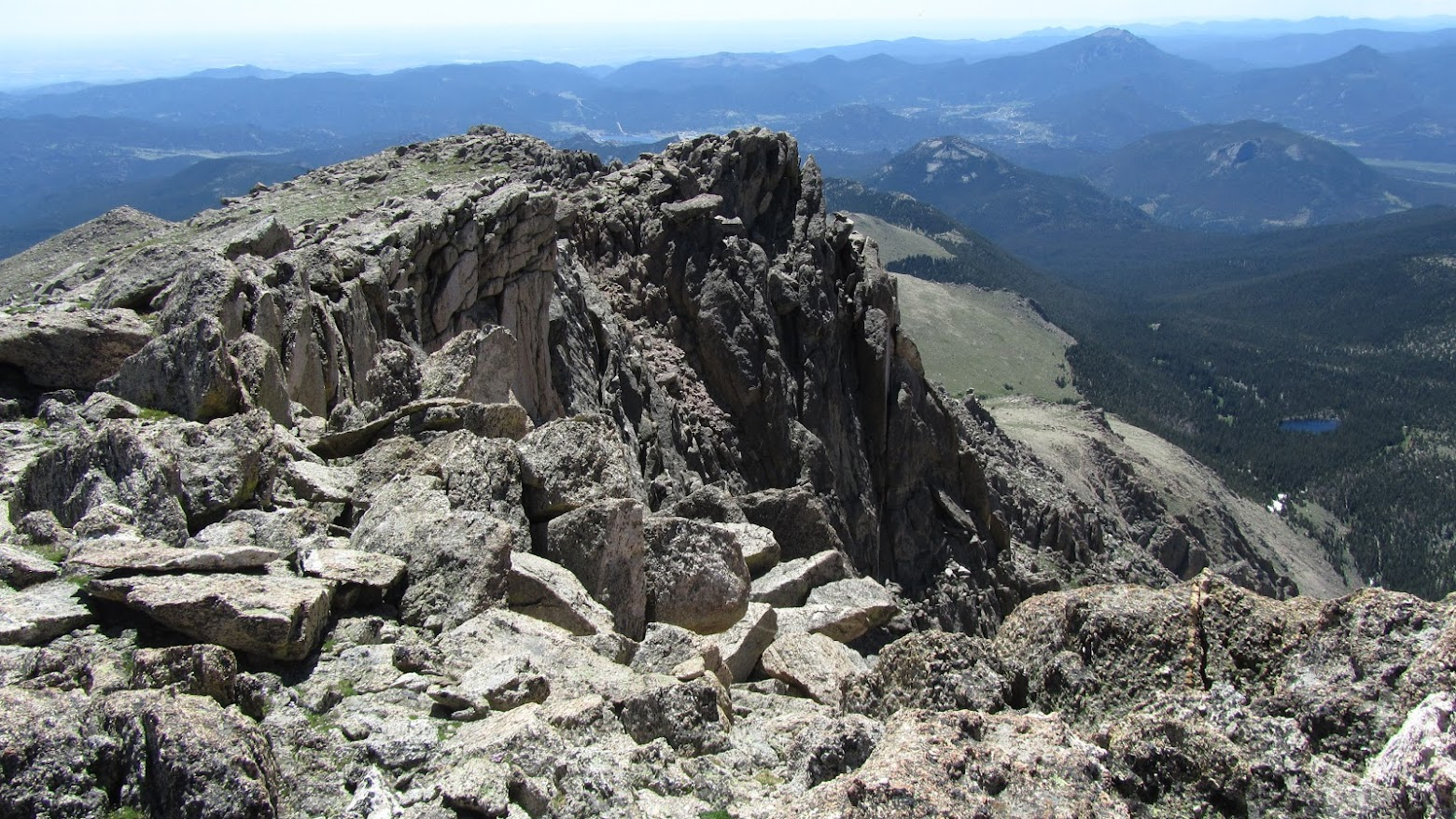
Mummy Mountain Cliffs Near Summit

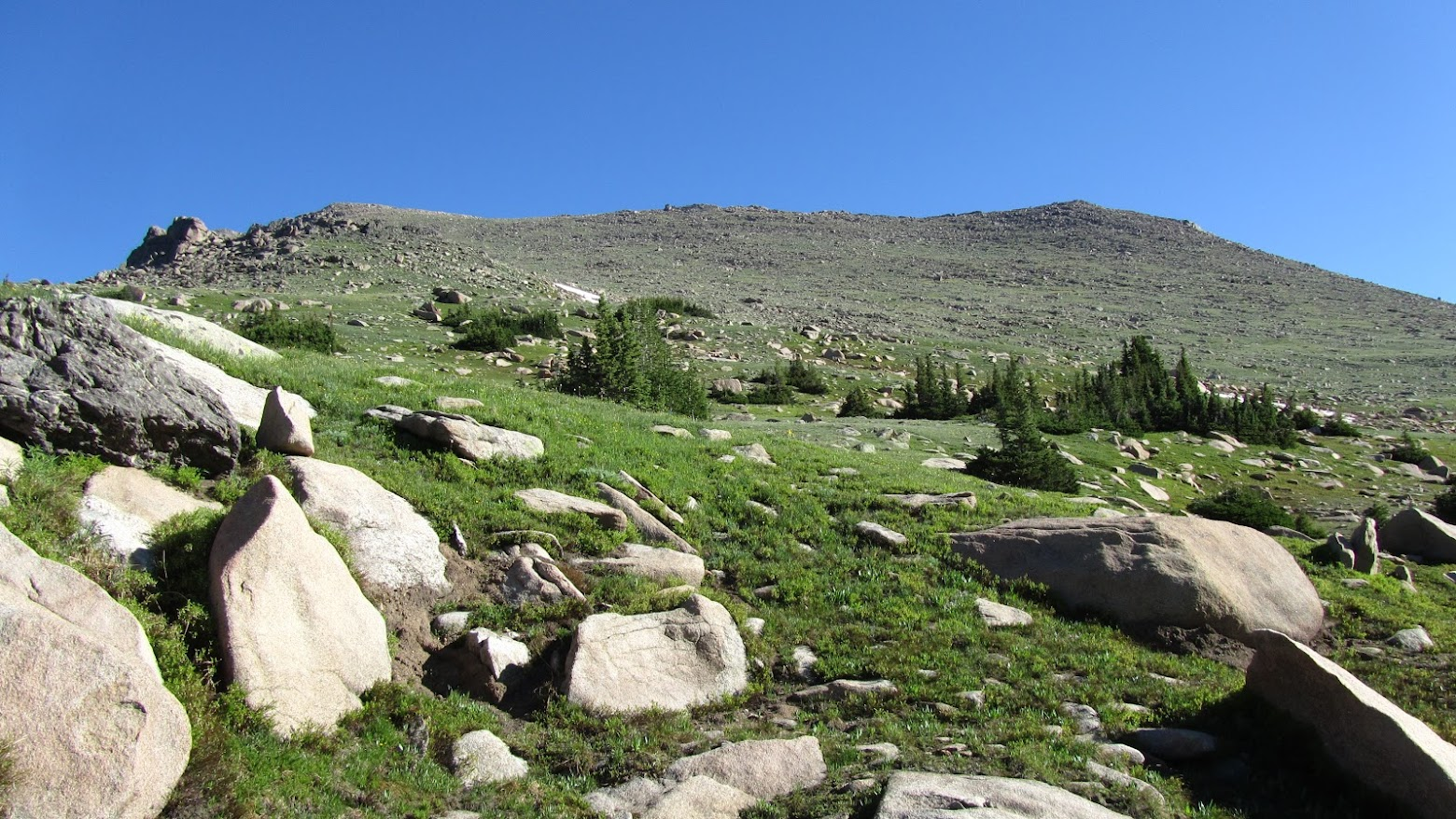
Mummy Mountain Southern Slope

== See also ==
- List of Colorado mountain ranges
- List of Colorado mountain summits
  - List of Colorado fourteeners
  - List of Colorado 4000 meter prominent summits
  - List of the most prominent summits of Colorado
- List of Colorado county high points
