= List of waterfalls in Colorado =

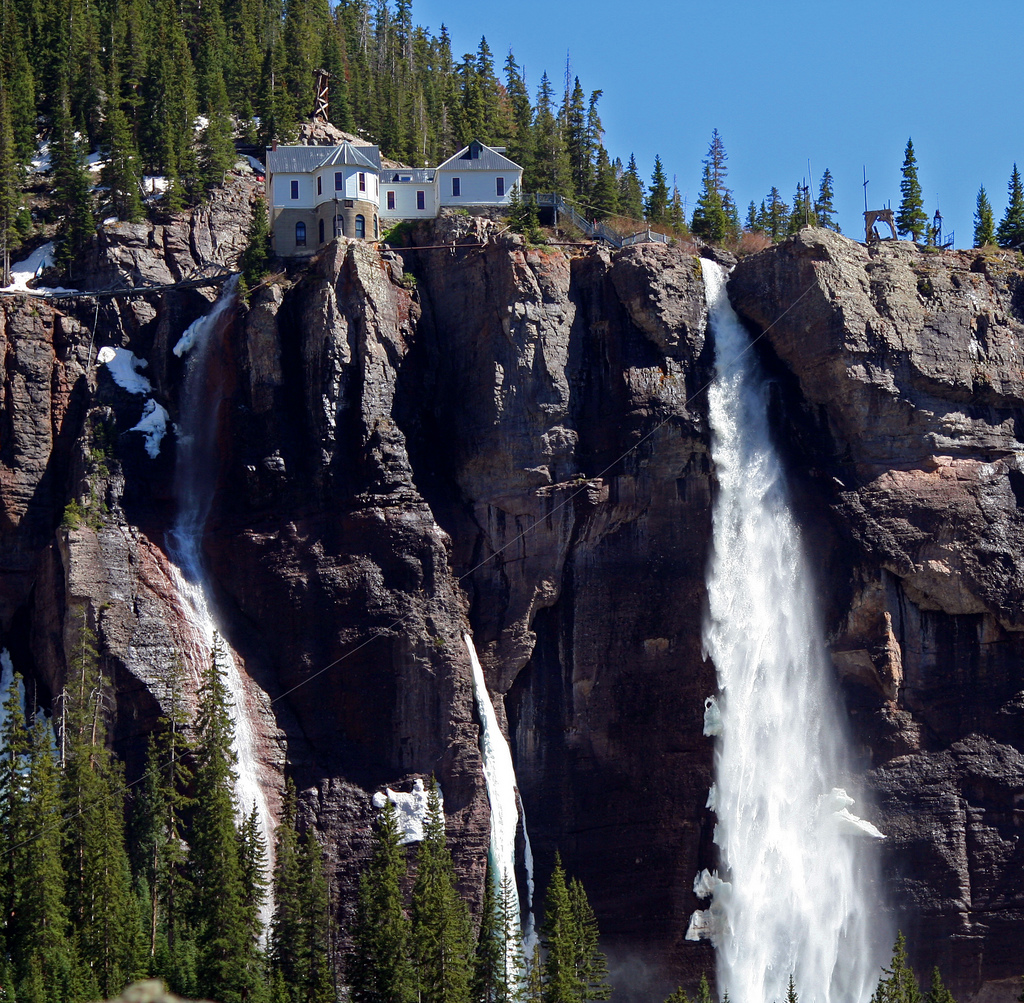
Bridal Veil Falls near Telluride.

This is a list of waterfalls in the U.S. State of Colorado.

== Waterfalls of Colorado ==
The following list includes all 81 waterfalls in Colorado that have official names according to the United States Geological Survey. There are also numerous unnamed waterfalls in the state.

Name	Watercourse	County	Coordinates	Elev. (ft)	Location
Adams Falls	East Inlet	Grand	40°14′12″N 105°47′47″W	8471	Rocky Mountain National Park
Agnes Vaille Falls		Chaffee	38°43′14″N 106°14′04″W	9278	San Isabel National Forest
Alberta Falls	Glacier Creek	Larimer	40°18′13″N 105°38′17″W	9406	Rocky Mountain National Park
Apache Falls		Huerfano	37°51′17″N 104°59′20″W	8776	San Isabel National Forest
Argenta Falls	Lake Fork Gunnison River	Hinsdale	37°59′21″N 107°17′38″W	8957	
Bear Creek Falls	Bear Creek	Ouray	38°00′00″N 107°39′37″W	8474	
Bedrock Falls	Pine Creek	Chaffee	38°56′40″N 106°20′24″W	11253	San Isabel National Forest
Bessies Falls		Garfield	40°00′02″N 107°16′44″W	9281	White River National Forest
Big Creek Falls	South Fork Big Creek	Jackson	40°54′32″N 106°38′18″W	9249	Routt National Forest
Boulder Falls	North Boulder Creek	Boulder	40°00′25″N 105°24′21″W	7050	
Bridal Veil Falls	Dead Horse Creek	Garfield	39°36′06″N 107°11′31″W	7211	White River National Forest
Bridal Veil Falls	Cow Creek	Larimer	40°26′09″N 105°33′04″W	8907	Rocky Mountain National Park
Bridal Veil Falls	Bridal Veil Creek	San Miguel	37°55′09″N 107°46′12″W	10275	
Calypso Cascades	Cony Creek	Boulder	40°11′39″N 105°35′26″W	9291	Rocky Mountain National Park
Cascade Falls	North Inlet	Grand	40°16′16″N 105°45′57″W	8760	Rocky Mountain National Park
Cascade Falls	Cascade Creek	Ouray	38°01′34″N 107°39′52″W	8373	Ouray
Chasm Falls	Fall River	Larimer	40°25′00″N 105°40′21″W	9055	Rocky Mountain National Park
Columbine Falls		Larimer	40°15′39″N 105°35′57″W	11486	Rocky Mountain National Park
Copeland Falls	North St. Vrain Creek	Boulder	40°12′23″N 105°34′07″W	8524	Rocky Mountain National Park
Cornet Falls	Cornet Creek	San Miguel	37°56′35″N 107°48′37″W	9186	Telluride
Crooke Falls	Lake Fork Gunnison River	Hinsdale	38°00′51″N 107°18′42″W	8724	
Crystal Falls	Crystal Falls Creek	Custer	37°57′42″N 105°28′53″W	9301	
Eagle Falls	Eagle Creek	Dolores	37°45′49″N 108°05′52″W	9062	San Juan National Forest
East Fork Falls	East Fork Parachute Creek	Garfield	39°33′45″N 108°00′50″W	7579	
East Middle Fork Falls	East Middle Fork Parachute Creek	Garfield	39°37′01″N 108°03′35″W	6663	
Elk Falls	Elk Creek	Park	39°30′22″N 105°24′49″W	8730	Staunton State Park
Fan Falls		Boulder	40°13′46″N 105°39′03″W	11099	Rocky Mountain National Park
Fern Falls	Fern Creek	Larimer	40°20′51″N 105°40′04″W	8812	Rocky Mountain National Park
Fish Creek Falls	Fish Creek	Routt	40°28′53″N 106°46′16″W	7536	Routt National Forest
Glacier Falls	Glacier Creek	Larimer	40°17′38″N 105°38′45″W	9878	Rocky Mountain National Park
Grace Falls	Fern Creek	Larimer	40°19′23″N 105°41′19″W	10269	Rocky Mountain National Park
Granite Falls	Tonauto Creek	Grand	40°19′07″N 105°46′19″W	9810	Rocky Mountain National Park
Gray Copper Falls		Ouray	37°55′20″N 107°39′24″W	10859	
Hayes Creek Falls	Hayes Creek	Pitkin	39°09′33″N 107°15′07″W	7490	
Helen Hunt Falls	North Cheyenne Creek	El Paso	38°47′19″N 104°54′11″W	7237	North Cheyenne Cañon Park
Horseshoe Falls	Roaring River	Larimer	40°24′50″N 105°38′03″W	8940	Rocky Mountain National Park
Ingram Falls	Ingram Creek	San Miguel	37°55′21″N 107°45′42″W	10961	
Judd Falls	Cooper Creek	Gunnison	38°57′35″N 106°58′43″W	9774	
Lost Falls	North Fork Big Thompson River	Larimer	40°30′13″N 105°33′59″W	9859	Rocky Mountain National Park
Lower Disaster Falls	Green River	Moffat	40°38′38″N 108°55′58″W	5246	Dinosaur National Monument
Lyric Falls	Hunters Creek	Boulder	40°13′27″N 105°35′46″W	10170	Rocky Mountain National Park
Macey Falls	Macey Creek	Custer	38°00′16″N 105°34′04″W	11329	San Isabel National Forest
Marguerite Falls	Fern Creek	Larimer	40°20′23″N 105°40′29″W	9449	Rocky Mountain National Park
McElmo Falls	McElmo Creek	Montezuma	37°19′10″N 108°36′57″W	5886	
Mertensia Falls		Boulder	40°12′46″N 105°38′28″W	10400	Rocky Mountain National Park
Missouri Falls		Gilpin	39°49′27″N 105°30′33″W	8596	
Morgan Creek Falls		Routt	40°32′44″N 107°12′17″W	6391	
North Clear Creek Falls	North Clear Creek	Hinsdale	37°50′57″N 107°09′01″W	10013	Rio Grande National Forest
Ouzel Falls	Ouzel Creek	Boulder	40°11′56″N 105°36′04″W	9498	Rocky Mountain National Park
Piedra Falls	East Fork Piedra River	Mineral	37°29′01″N 107°05′42″W	8409	Weminuche Wilderness
Poudre Falls	Cache la Poudre River	Larimer	40°38′54″N 105°48′48″W	8602	Roosevelt National Forest
Rainbow Falls	Fountain Creek	El Paso	38°52′12″N 104°55′33″W	6621	
Red Falls	Navajo River	Archuleta	37°10′43″N 106°40′36″W	8812	
Ribbon Falls	Glacier Creek	Larimer	40°16′01″N 105°38′25″W	10571	Rocky Mountain National Park
Rifle Falls	Rifle Creek	Garfield	39°40′40″N 107°41′55″W	6604	Rifle Falls State Park
Saguache Falls	Middle Fork Saguache Creek	Saguache	37°56′30″N 106°48′10″W	10774	La Garita Wilderness
Saint Marys Falls		El Paso	38°46′15″N 104°55′06″W	8934	
Seven Falls	South Cheyenne Creek	El Paso	38°46′44″N 104°52′48″W	6893	
Silver Cascade Falls		El Paso	38°47′12″N 104°54′23″W	7588	North Cheyenne Cañon Park
Silver Falls	Waterfall Creek	Mineral	37°25′19″N 106°46′57″W	10840	San Juan National Forest
Snake River Falls	North Fork Snake River	Summit	39°38′25″N 105°52′54″W	10571	
Snyder Falls	Lake Creek	Lake	39°04′11″N 106°26′39″W	9721	San Isabel National Forest
South Clear Creek Falls	South Clear Creek	Hinsdale	37°49′31″N 107°09′21″W	9649	Rio Grande National Forest
South Fork Falls	South Fork White River	Garfield	39°50′02″N 107°23′15″W	8619	White River National Forest
The Falls		Chaffee	38°46′22″N 106°03′45″W	7949	
Thousand Falls	Sundance Creek	Larimer	40°24′39″N 105°39′50″W	9101	Rocky Mountain National Park
Thunder Falls		Boulder	40°13′39″N 105°38′23″W	10892	Rocky Mountain National Park
Timberline Falls	Icy Brook	Larimer	40°17′06″N 105°39′52″W	10462	Rocky Mountain National Park
Timberline Falls	Middle St. Vrain Creek	Boulder	40°08′08″N 105°33′35″W	9219	Roosevelt National Forest
Treasure Falls	Henson Creek	Hinsdale	38°01′10″N 107°21′44″W	9006	Gunnison National Forest
Treasure Falls	Fall Creek	Mineral	37°26′35″N 106°52′26″W	8540	San Juan National Forest
Trinchera Falls	Trinchera Creek	Las Animas	37°10′04″N 104°00′49″W	5420	
Trio Falls		Boulder	40°14′09″N 105°38′29″W	11319	Rocky Mountain National Park
Triplet Falls	Green River	Moffat	40°36′17″N 108°56′57″W	5171	Dinosaur National Monument
Upper Disaster Falls	Green River	Moffat	40°39′01″N 108°56′00″W	5810	Dinosaur National Monument
Venable Falls	Venable Creek	Custer	38°04′32″N 105°35′45″W	10485	San Isabel National Forest
War Dance Falls	Ptarmigan Creek	Grand	40°17′18″N 105°43′46″W	9895	Rocky Mountain National Park
West Fork Falls	West Fork Parachute Creek	Garfield	39°37′46″N 108°09′43″W	7100	
Whitnach Falls	Fryingpan River	Eagle	39°22′34″N 107°00′43″W	6791	
Zapata Falls	South Zapata Creek	Alamosa	37°37′08″N 105°33′11″W	9409	

== See also ==
- List of waterfalls
- Hydrology
  - List of rivers in Colorado
