= Mount Chapin =

Summit in Rocky Mountain National Park

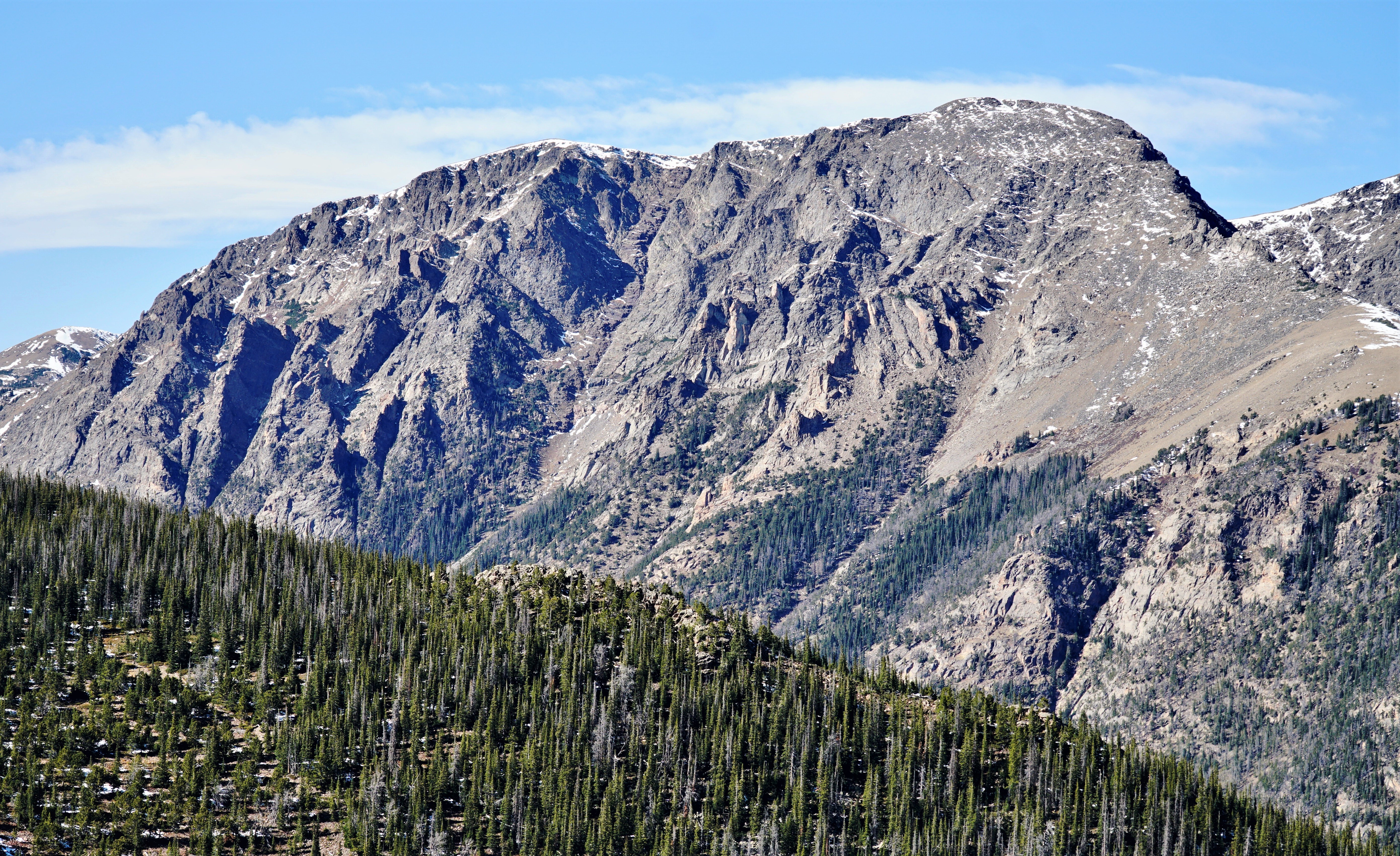
- Southeast aspect, from Trail Ridge Road

Highest point
- Elevation: 12,454 ft (3,796 m)
- Prominence: 414 ft (126 m)
- Parent peak: Ypsilon Mountain (13,514 ft)
- Isolation: 1.81 mi (2.91 km)
- Coordinates: 40°26′01″N 105°42′07″W

Naming
- Etymology: Frederick H. Chapin

Geography
- Location within Colorado Location within the United States
- Location: Rocky Mountain National Park; Larimer County, Colorado, US
- Parent range: Rocky Mountains; Mummy Range
- Topo map: USGS Trail Ridge

Climbing
- Easiest route: class 1 hiking

Mount Chapin is a 12,454-foot-elevation (3,796-meter) mountain summit located in Rocky Mountain National Park, in Larimer County, of Colorado, United States. It is situated 11 miles west-northwest of the community of Estes Park, one mile east of Chapin Pass, and six miles east of the Continental Divide. Mount Chapin is part of the Mummy Range which is a subset of the Rocky Mountains. Topographic relief is significant as the south aspect rises 2,700 feet (820 meters) above Fall River in less than one mile. Neighbors include Mount Chiquita and Ypsilon Mountain to the immediate northeast, and the park's Alpine Visitor Center is three miles to the west.

== Etymology ==
The mountain's name was officially adopted by the United States Board on Geographic Names in 1932. The name commemorates Frederick H. Chapin (1852–1900), a mountaineer, photographer, amateur archaeologist, and author who wrote the 1889 book, "Mountaineering in Colorado: The Peaks about Estes Park." He is best known for his exploration of mesas and ancient Pueblo ruins found in the Mesa Verde area of southwest Colorado. He is also the namesake of Chapin Mesa which shelters the most famous cliff dwellings within Mesa Verde National Park.

== Climate ==
According to the Köppen climate classification system, Mount Chapin is located in an alpine subarctic climate zone with cold, snowy winters, and cool to warm summers. Due to its altitude, it receives precipitation all year, as snow in winter, and as thunderstorms in summer, with a dry period in late spring. Precipitation runoff from the mountain drains north into the Cache la Poudre River via Chapin Creek, and south into the Fall River.

== Gallery ==
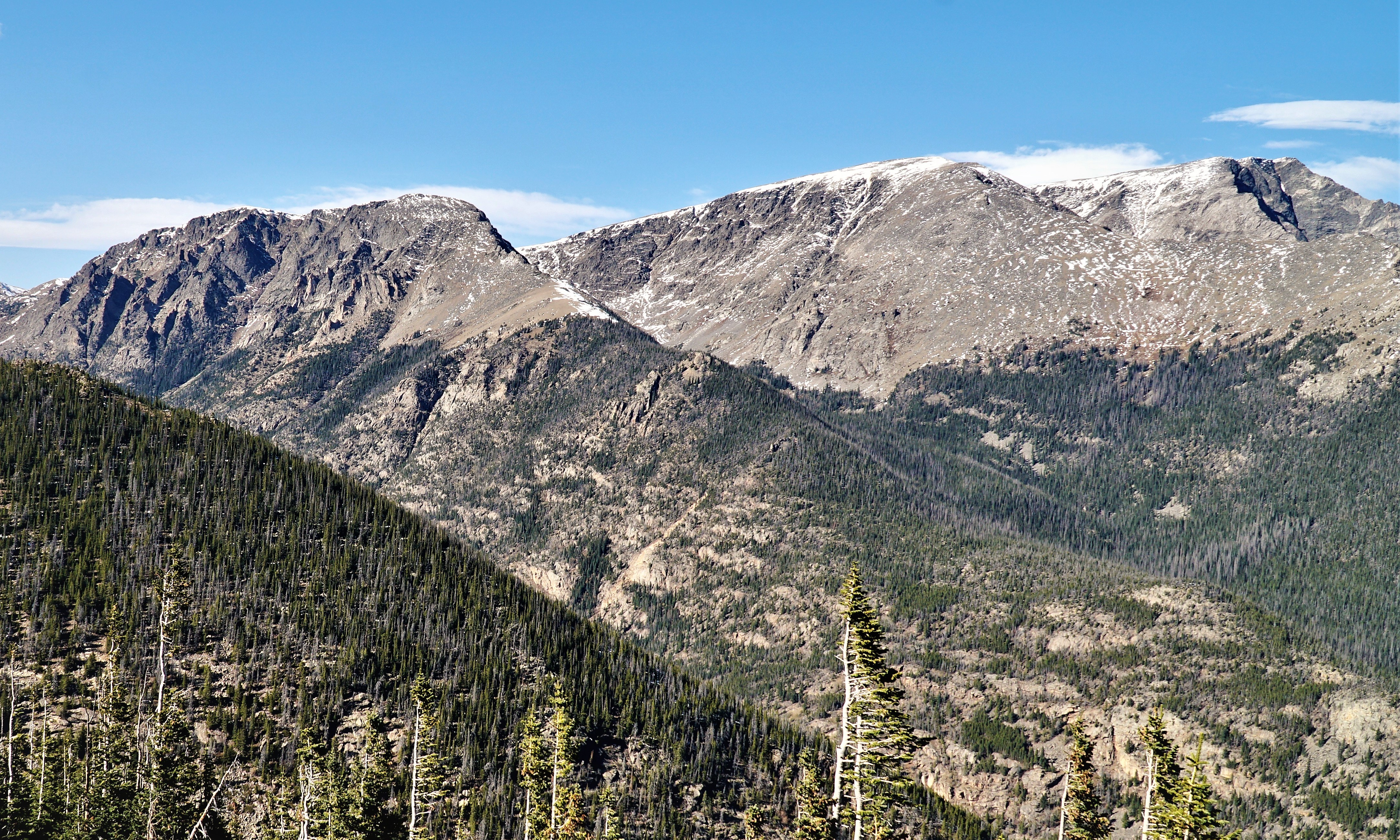
Mt. Chapin, Mt. Chiquita, and Ypsilon Mountain seen from southeast

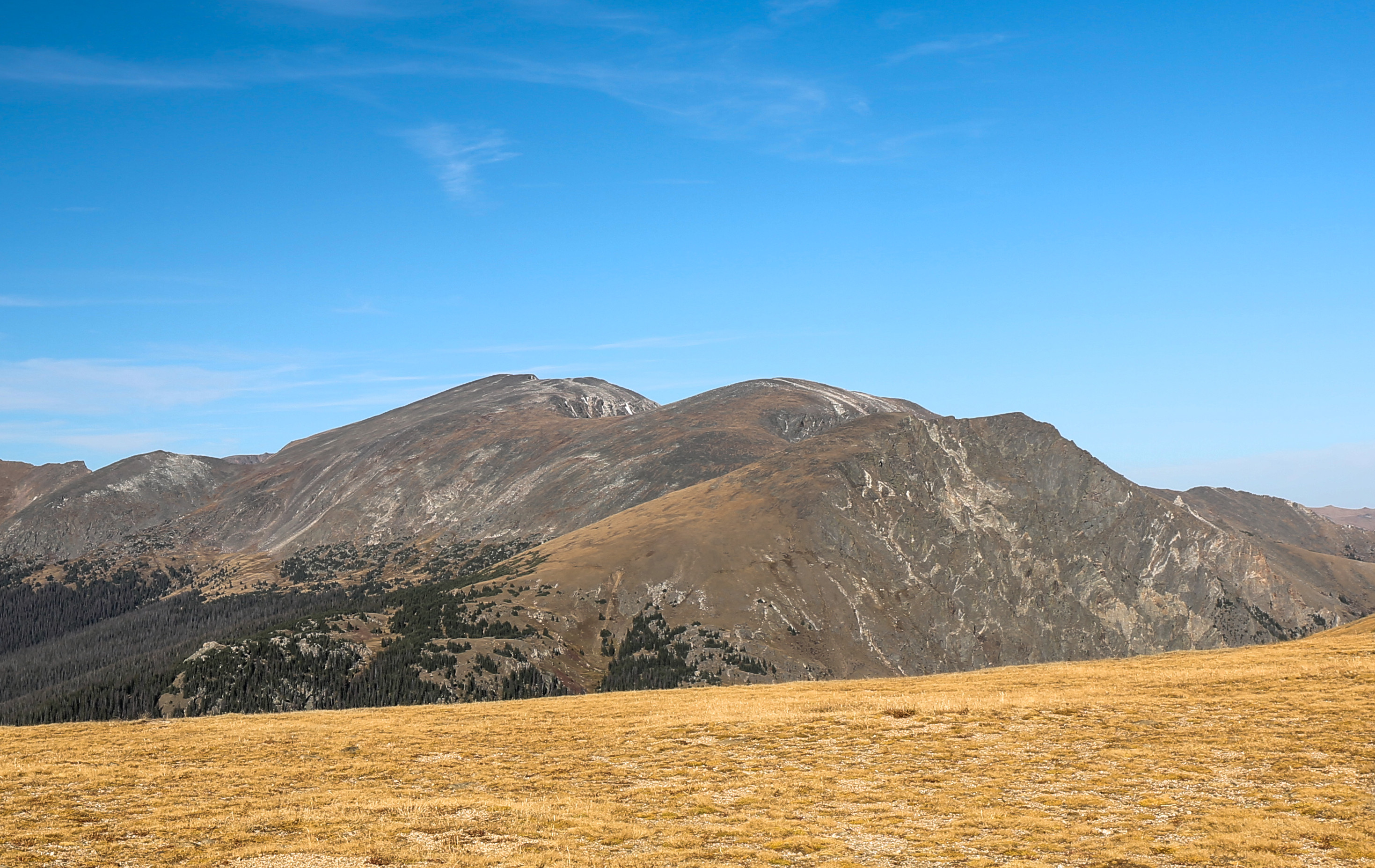
Ypsilon Mountain, Mt. Chiquita, and Mt. Chapin seen from southwest

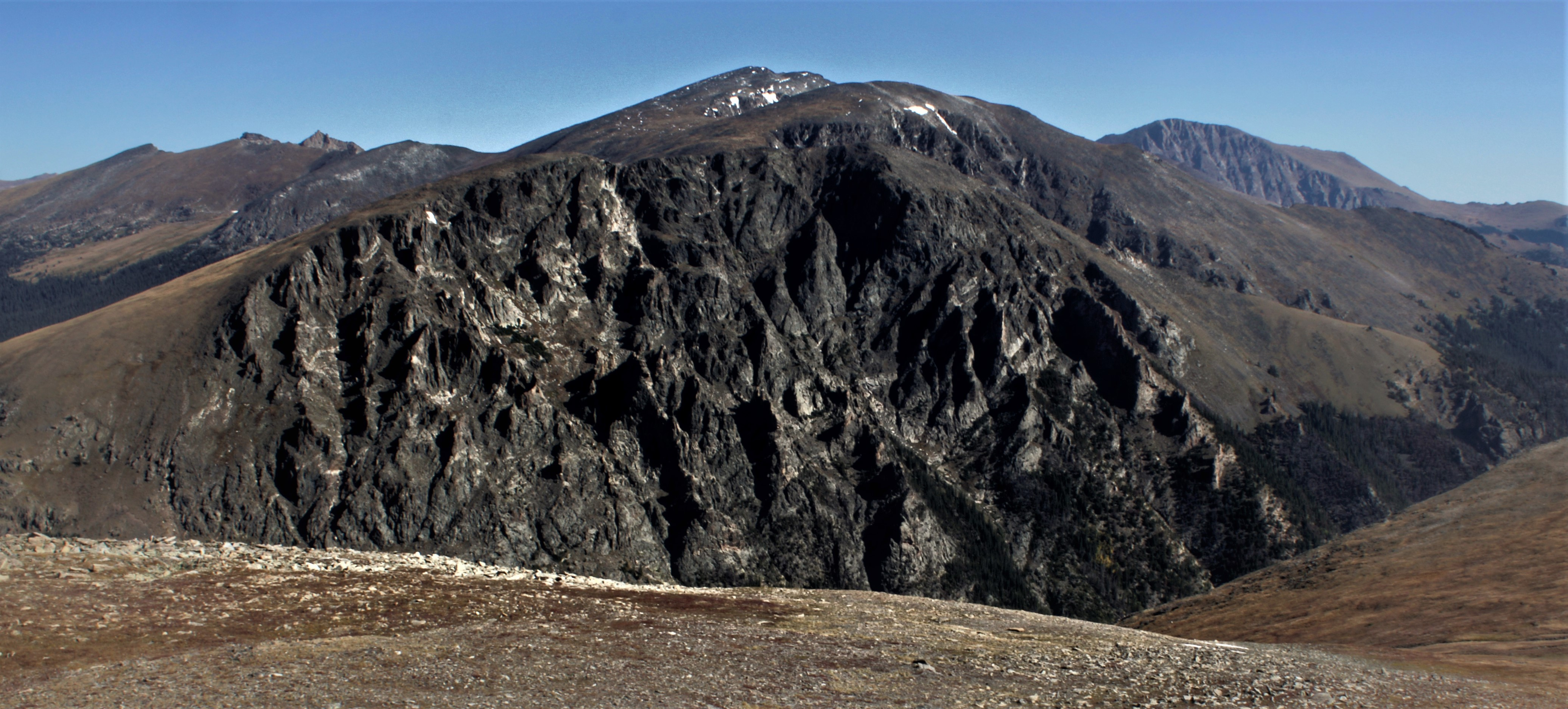
Mt. Chapin, Mt. Chiquita, and Ypsilon Mountain lined up. Mummy Mountain to right.

== See also ==
- List of peaks in Rocky Mountain National Park
- Mountains of Larimer County, Colorado
