= Helen Hunt (disambiguation) =

Helen Hunt (born 1963) is an American actress.

Helen Hunt may also refer to:

== People ==
- Helen Hunt (hair stylist) (fl. 1930s–1967), Hollywood hair stylist
- Helen LaKelly Hunt (born 1949), founder and president of The Sister Fund
- Helen Stewart Hunt (born 1938), Canadian swimmer
- Helen Hunt Jackson (1830–1885), American writer and activist

== Other uses ==
- Helen Hunt Falls, a waterfall in Colorado Springs, Colorado, United States
- "Helen Hunt" (Legends of Tomorrow), a television episode
