= Lawn Lake Dam =

Former dam in Rocky Mountain National Park, Colorado, United States

Coordinates: 40°27′51″N 105°37′41″W

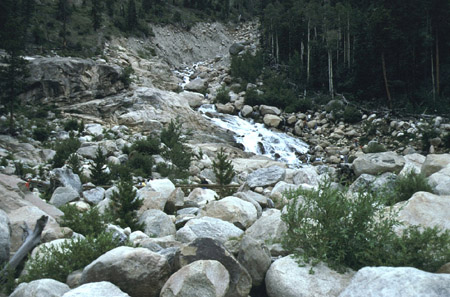
The flood caused by the failure of Lawn Lake Dam scoured Roaring River valley and deposited an alluvial fan of debris in Horseshoe Park.

Lawn Lake Dam was an earthen dam in Rocky Mountain National Park, United States that failed on July 15, 1982, at about 6 a.m., in an event known as the flood of 1982. The sudden release of 30 million cubic feet (850,000 m^{3}) of water resulted in a flash flood that killed three people camping in the park and caused $31 million in damage to the town of Estes Park, Colorado and other downstream areas.

== Lawn Lake ==
Lawn Lake was originally a natural lake with a surface area of 16.4 acres (6.6 hectares), located at an elevation of approximately 11,000 feet (3,400 m) in the Rocky Mountains. In 1903 a group of farmers from Loveland built a dam to increase it to a surface area of 48 acres (19 hectares) for the purpose of providing water for irrigation in Loveland.

== Dam failure ==
Over the years the road that had been cut to permit construction of the dam fell into disrepair and ceased to exist. Because of the dam's remote and difficult location, inspection and repairs lapsed. The Colorado State Engineer determined that the probable cause of the dam failure was deterioration of lead caulking on the joint between the outlet pipe and the gate valve leading to internal erosion of the earth-fill dam. There had been issues reported during inspections in 1951, 1975, 1977 and 1978.

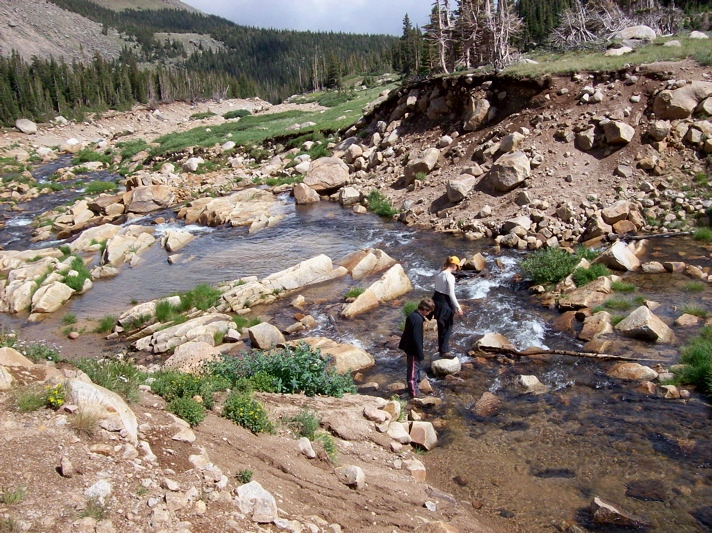
The mouth of Lawn Lake (the site of the dam) in July 2007, 25 years after the accident.

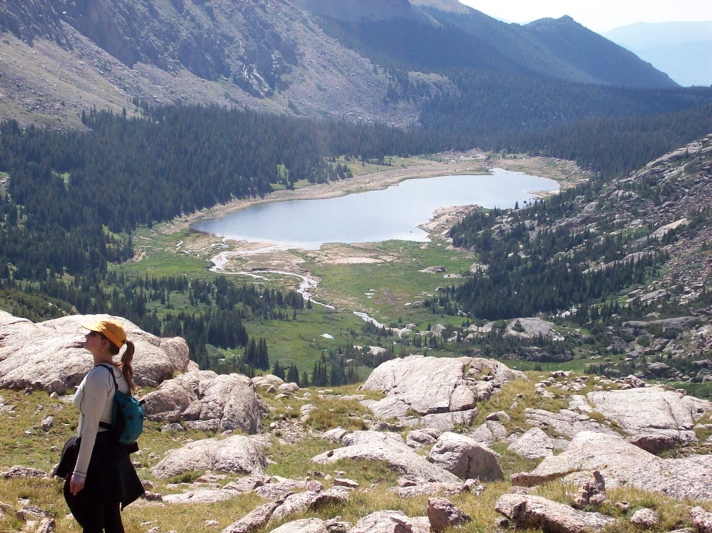
Lawn Lake in 2007, 25 years after the accident, with the shore still showing the former extent of the lake.

When the dam failed the waters rushed down the Roaring River valley, which falls 2,500 feet (760 m) in 6 miles (9.7 km), at a peak rate of 18,000 cu ft/s (510 m^{3}/s), scouring a large gully out of the mountain stream and killing one person camping alongside it. At this rate, the lake emptied in about half an hour. When the waters reached the broader valley of Fall River at Horseshoe Park they spread out and slowed, leaving behind a large alluvial fan of debris. The flood continued down Fall River and hit the Cascade Dam which stored water to run a hydroelectric plant about a mile (2 km) downstream. Cascade Dam failed from the onslaught and added its waters to the flood. The Aspenglen campground was destroyed and two campers who returned to recover camping gear lost their lives, due to insufficient warning from park rangers.

The flood entered the town of Estes Park and caused severe damage to 177 downtown businesses (75 percent of Estes Park's commercial activity). In Estes Park the flood joined the Big Thompson River and flowed into Lake Estes on the eastern edge of the city. Olympus Dam, part of the Colorado-Big Thompson Project, there withstood the deluge and the flood was halted.

== Aftermath ==
As a consequence of the dam failure, aging dams at Pear Reservoir, Bluebird Lake and Sandbeach Lake in the park were demolished and removed.
