= Agnes Vaille Falls =

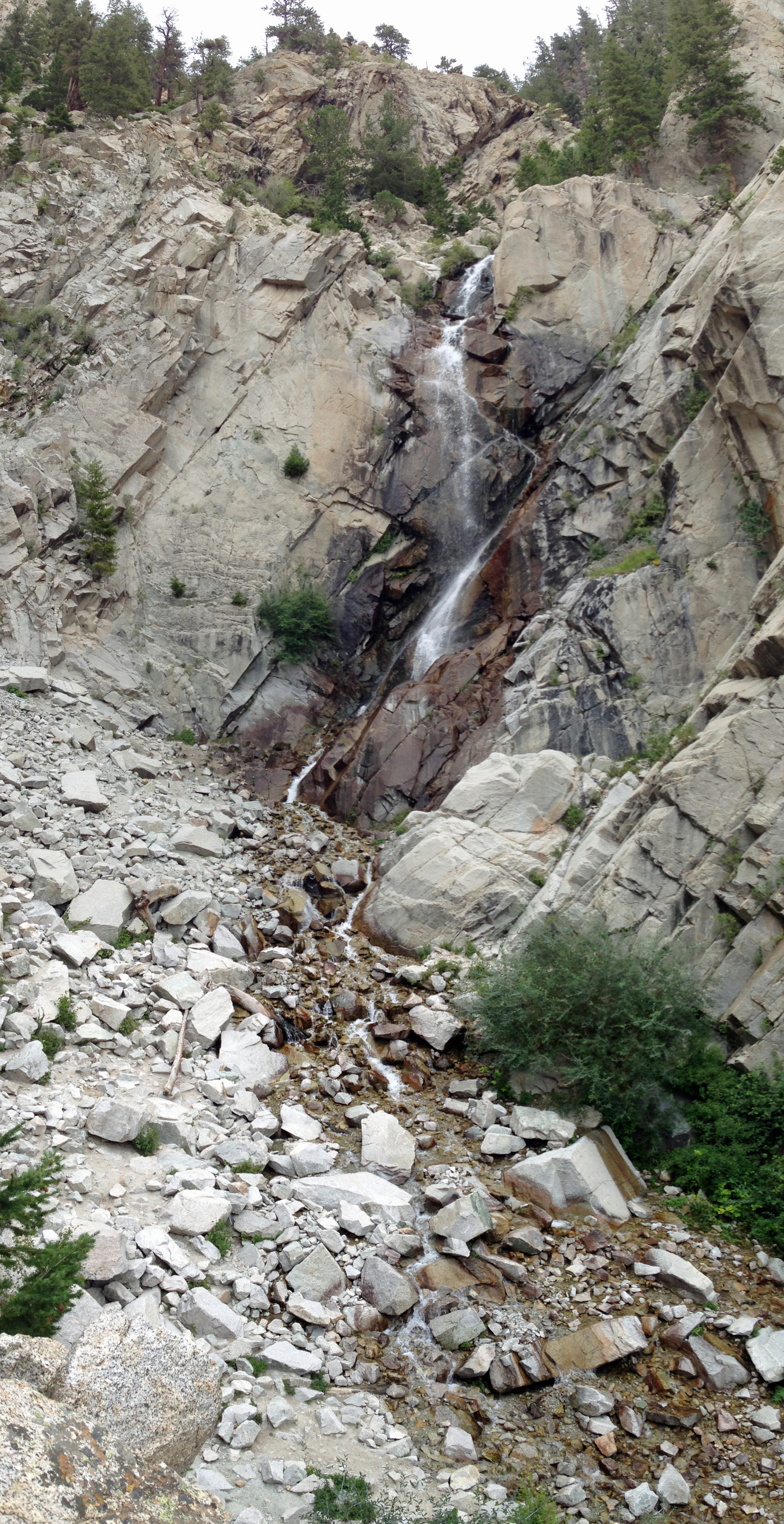
- Agnes Vaille Falls

- Location within Colorado
- Location: Chaffee County, Colorado, United States
- Coordinates: 38°43′14″N 106°14′04″W
- Type: Cascade
- Elevation: 9,278 feet (2,828 m)

Agnes Vaille Falls is a waterfall on the southern slopes of Mount Princeton just above Chalk Creek in San Isabel National Forest, Chaffee County, Colorado, United States. The falls has been a popular half mile hike from county road 162 near Chalk Lake.

On September 30, 2013 five hikers were killed and another injured at the falls by a rockslide that was likely triggered in part by the 2013 Colorado floods. The trail to the falls was closed by the U.S. Forest Service following the accident, and recovery of the bodies was hampered by the United States federal government shutdown of 2013, which began the following day. This trail is, however, still being taken today, as there are no officials signs stating it is still closed. Social media shows much activity on the once closed trail. “Trail will be rerouted due to rock slide danger. Use extreme caution if hiking to the falls until the reroute is completed.” http://www.fs.usda.gov/r02/psicc/recreation

== See also ==
- List of waterfalls
- List of waterfalls in Colorado
