= Frederick H. Chapin =

American photographer (1852–1900)

Frederick Hastings Chapin (5 September 1852 – 25 January 1900) was an American businessman, mountaineer, photographer, amateur archaeologist and author. He is best known for his exploration of mesas and ancient Pueblo ruins found in the Mesa Verde area of Colorado.

== Mesa Verde ==
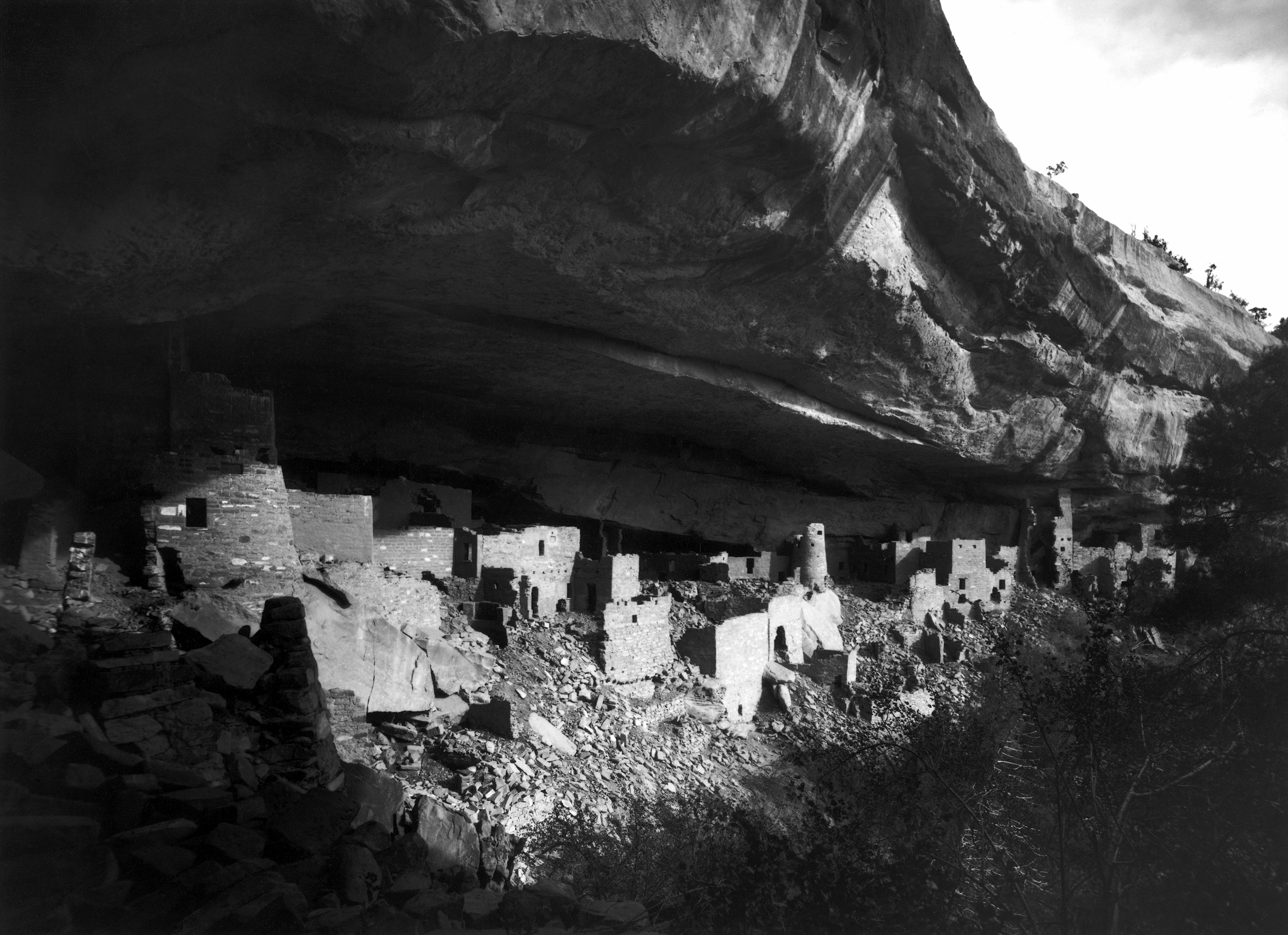
The Cliff Palace in 1891.

Chapin visited the Mesa Verde region during the summers of 1889 and 1890, using explorer Richard Wetherill and members of his family as guides. Although active in exploring and photographing the sites, Chapin was not heavily involved in excavating the ruins or collecting artifacts, though he photographed artifacts collected by the Wetherills. Chapin also assessed the climbing possibilities of mesas and peaks in the area. He described the landscape and ruins in an 1890 article and later in The Land of the Cliff-Dwellers, a book published in 1892 by the Appalachian Mountain Club.

Chapin Mesa, which shelters many of the best known cliff dwellings of Mesa Verde, is after him.

== Rocky Mountain National Park ==
Frederick H. Chapin explored the Rocky Mountain National Park area and published the book, Mountaineering in Colorado: The Peaks about Estes Park in 1889. Mount Chapin in the Mummy Range is named for Chapin, and his wife named nearby Ypsilon Mountain.

== Publications ==
- Chapin, Frederick Hastings (1892). The Land of the Cliff-Dwellers. Boston: Appalachian Mountain Club /W. B. Clarke and Co.. Reprinted by the University of Arizona Press, with notes and foreword by Robert H. Lister, 1988. ISBN 0-8165-1052-0.
- Chapin, Frederick Hastings. "Cliff-dwellings of the Mancos Canons". American Antiquarian and Oriental Journal. 12 (4): 193.
- Chapin, Frederick Hastings (May 1890). "Cliff-dwellings of the Mancos Canons". Appalachia. 6: 12.
- Chapin, Frederick Hastings (1889). Mountaineering in Colorado: The Peaks about Estes Park. Boston: Appalachian Mountain Club. Reprinted in 1987, with forward and notes by James H. Pickering, by the University of Nebraska Press, Lincoln.
