= Chasm Falls =

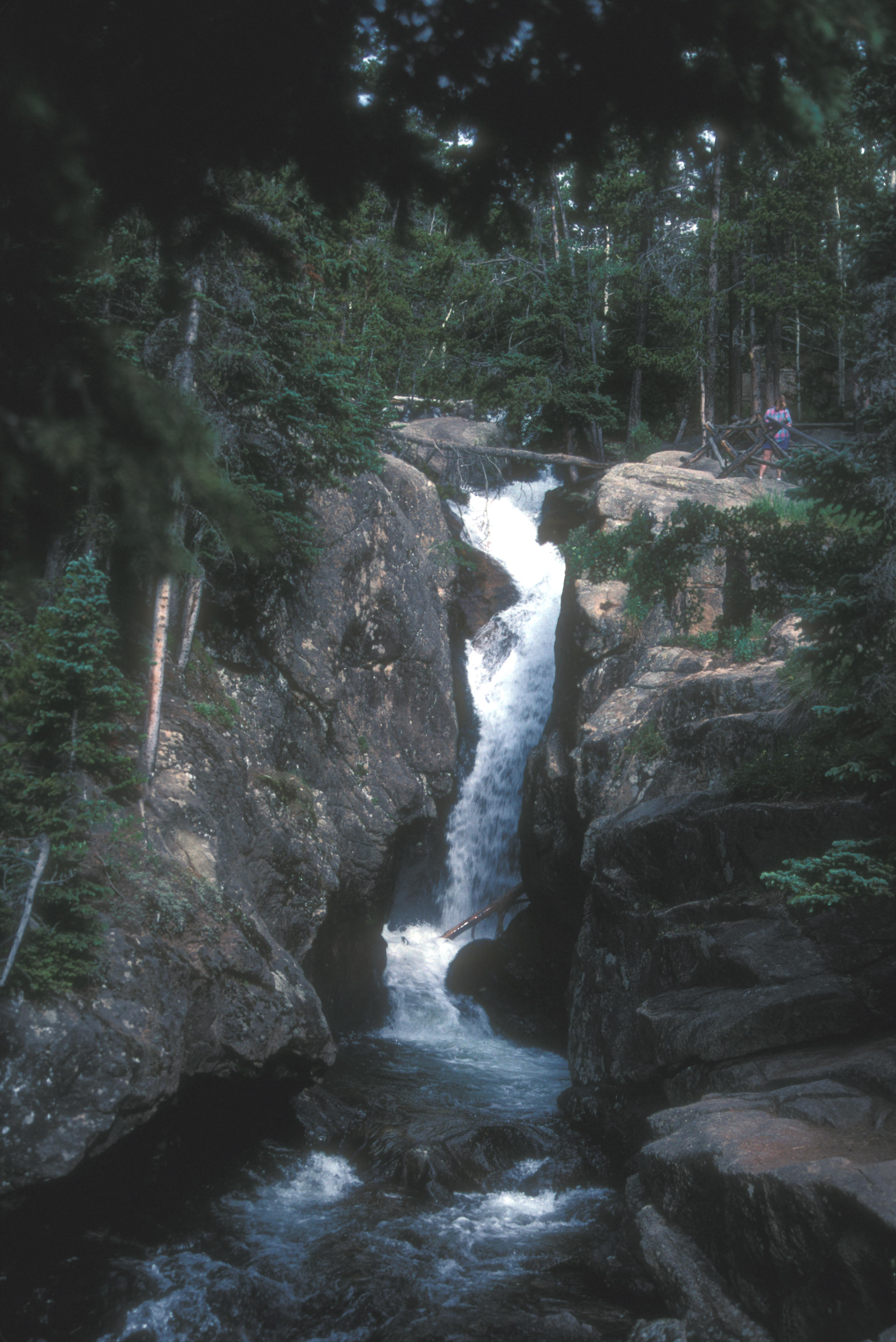

- Location within Colorado
- Location: Rocky Mountain National Park, Colorado
- Coordinates: 40°25′01″N 105°40′21″W
- Elevation: 9,068 feet (2,764 m)
- Total height: 25 feet (7.6 m)
- Number of drops: 1
- Watercourse: Fall River

Chasm Falls is a waterfall with a 25-foot (7.6 m) drop located on the Fall River in Rocky Mountain National Park.

== See also ==
- List of waterfalls
- Waterfalls of Colorado
