= Horseshoe Park =

Area in Colorado, US

Coordinates: 40.408°N 105.639°W

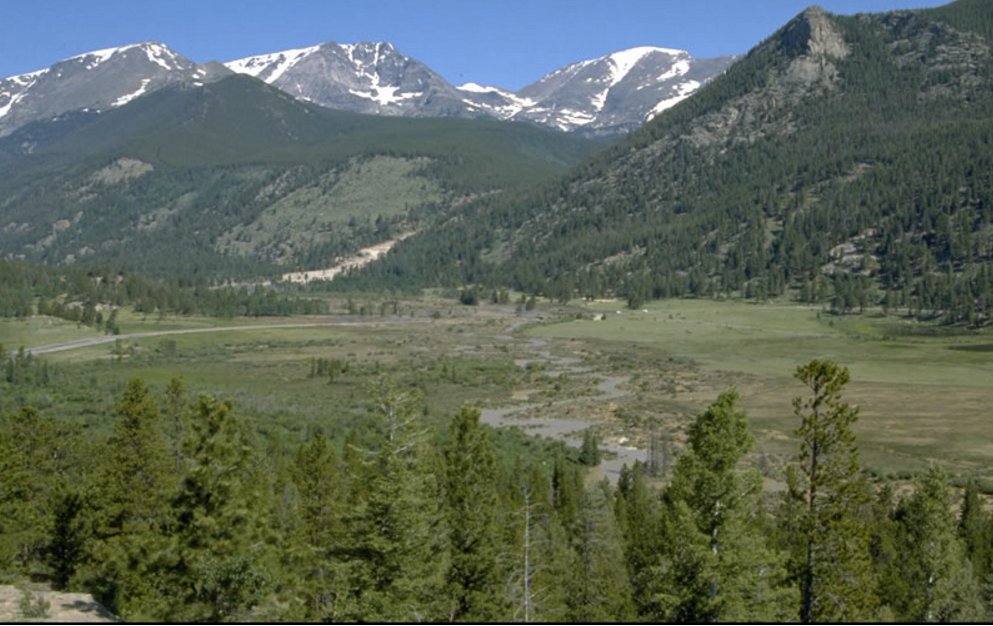
Horseshoe Park, courtesy of Rocky Mountain National Park

Horseshoe Park is a flat at 8,524 feet (2,598 m) in elevation in Larimer County, Colorado. It is within the Rocky Mountain National Park, which lies between Estes Park to the east and Grand Lake, Colorado on the west. Horseshoe Park is home to bighorn sheep, elk and other wildlife, and it is a wetland sanctuary for a wide variety of birds. Recreational activities include picnicking, hiking, cross-country skiing and snowshoeing. Roaring River, Lawn Lake and Crystal Lake are located here.

An inn was operated in the area for almost 25 years, until 1931, when the inn was purchased by the federal government. After the inn was removed, the land returned to its natural state. From 1933 to 1942, the Civilian Conservation Corps operated a camp in Horseshoe Park, and the men removed beetle-infested trees, built and improved trails and campgrounds, and other projects.

== Geology ==
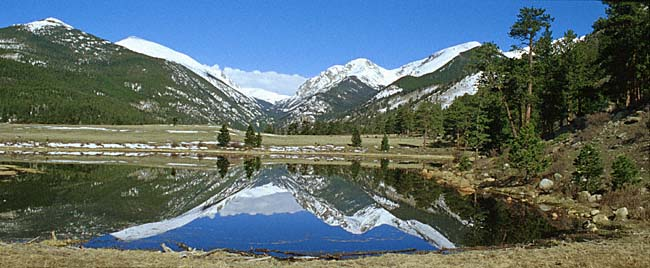
Sundance Mountain (12,466 feet) on left, Mount Chaplin (12,454 and Mount Chiquita (13,069 feet) reflect in one of the Sheep Lakes in Horseshoe Park shortly after the ice had melted in the spring. Courtesy of Rocky Mountain National Park.

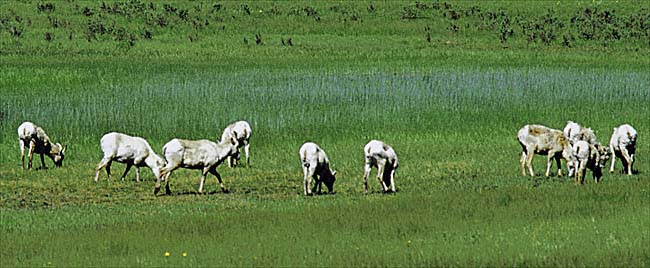
Rocky Mountain sheep, or Bighorn sheep, grazing near Sheep Lakes (Horseshoe Park) in June. The sheep come down from the high country, cross the road and graze for up to an hour or more before returning to the high mountains. Courtesy of Rocky Mountain National Park

The park is in the lower elevations of Rocky Mountain National Park, within the montane ecosystem of forests and grasslands. The U-shaped valley was formed by the movement of a 500-foot thick glacier over hundreds of years. About 15,000 years ago, the glacier pushed through the valley, receded, was deposited rubble into a terminal down the valley and when it melted a lateral moraine remained. The sediment left behind from melted waters became the meadows of Horseshoe Park and deep depressions created Sheep Lakes there, where bighorn sheep congregate. Sheep Lakes is located at 8,650 feet (2,640 m) above sea level.

== History ==
=== Prehistory ===
Elk have been coming to the area since the melting of the Pinedale glaciers about 13,000 years ago. Vegetation grew to support large herds of elk, bighorn sheep, deer, pronghorn antelope, and bison. Native Americans hunted wildlife there.

=== Early 20th-century ===
In the early 1900s, William H. Ashton left Massachusetts for Estes Park. He built the Horseshoe Inn to serve as many as 115 guests. He also owned and operated a lodge at Lawn Lake. The inn was purchased by the government in 1931 and razed to restore the terrain for wildlife. On June 30, 1932, it was officially named Horseshoe Park by the National Park Service.

=== Civilian Conservation Camp ===
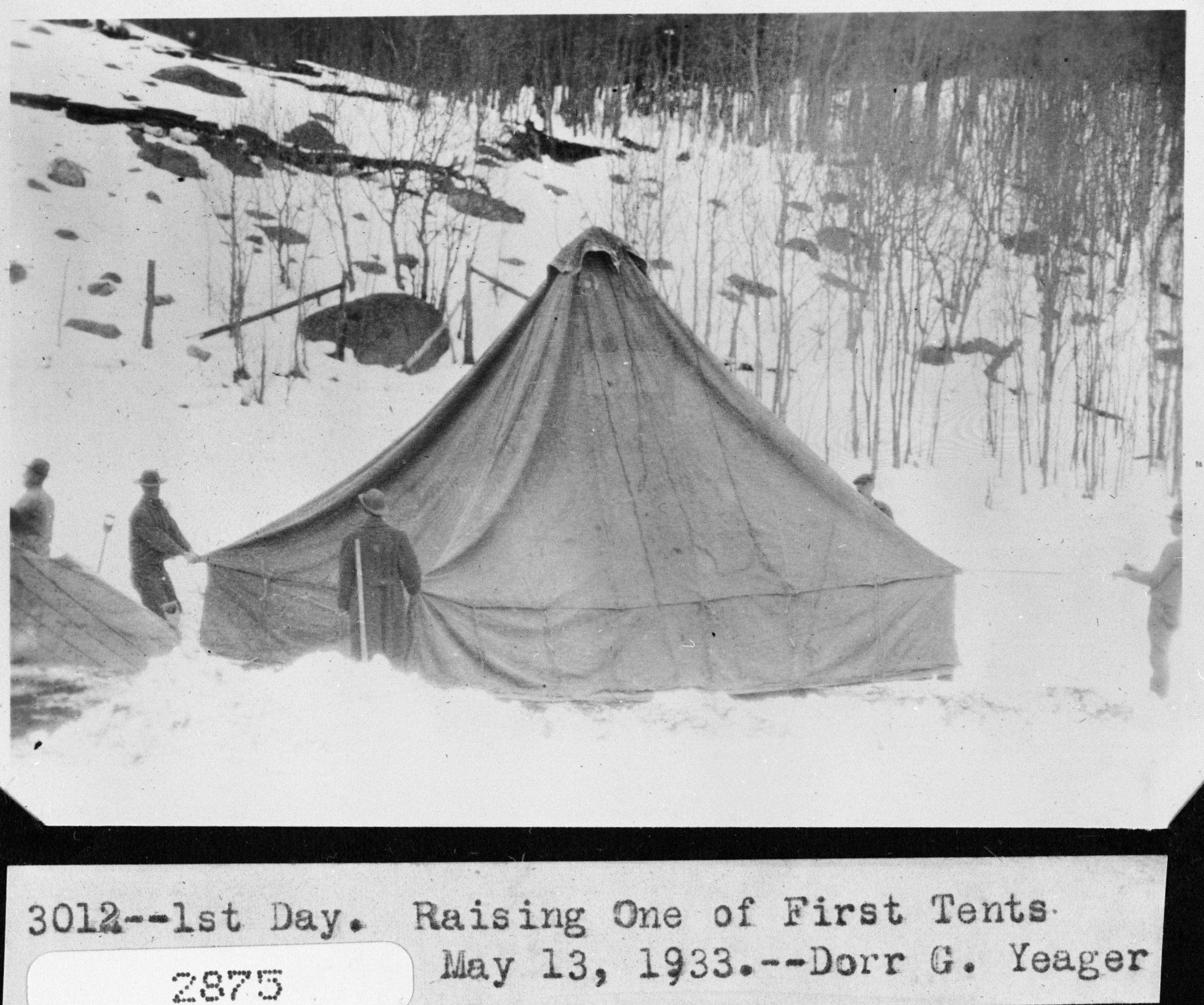
Raising one of the first tents for the Civilian Conservation Corps (CCC) base on May 13, 1933, the camp's first day

Little Horseshoe Park became the site of a Civilian Conservation Corps (CCC) base beginning in May 1933. The initial crew of unmarried young men instigated a riot since they arrived before sufficient food, clothing, bedding and other supplies had arrived. Once the supplies arrived, another blizzard ruined the camp's tents.

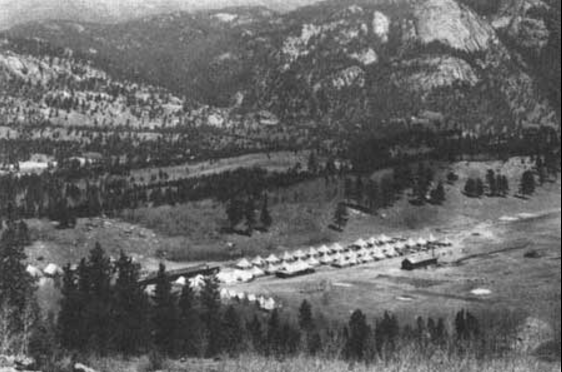
Civilian Conservation Corps camp, 1933-1942, Horseshoe Park, Rocky Mountain National Park

The following day, 100 men rallied and cut down trees infested by beetles. The camp held just under 200 men. Some men left the program, but many remained due to lack of economic opportunities during the Great Depression. The corps improved the park. They built and improved trails and campgrounds. The corps removed buildings and structures to return the land to its natural habitat. Park buildings were landscaped and telephone lines were installed. The CCC camp disbanded in 1942, when the federal program was shut down.

=== Flood of 1982 ===
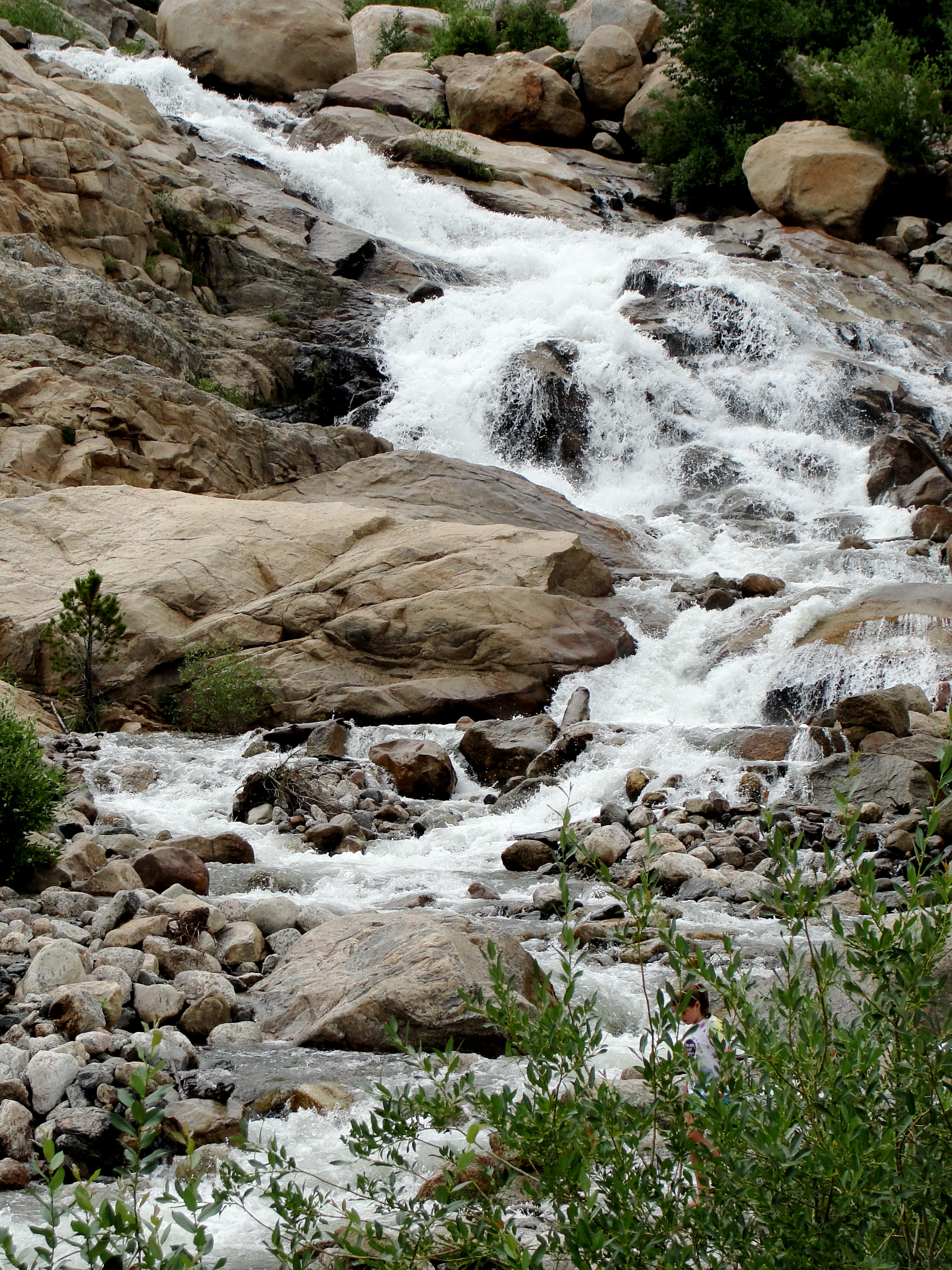
Alluvial Fan Falls

The flood of July 15, 1982, called the "great washout", sent 39 million gallons of water down Roaring River and into Estes Park. A wall of water, estimated at 25 to 30 feet (7.6 to 9.1 m) high, flowed from the river's source at Crystal Lake, through the river to Lawn Lake, before a confluence with Fall River in Horseshoe Park. The collapse of the Lawn Lake Dam in 1982 scoured the river's channel and deposited an alluvial fan of debris. One person was killed as he slept along the river and two others died in a campground. The water continued to flow through Fall River into Estes Park, where it broke through two dams. Now, trees stumps and other woody debris remain at the high water line of the flood.

== Attractions ==
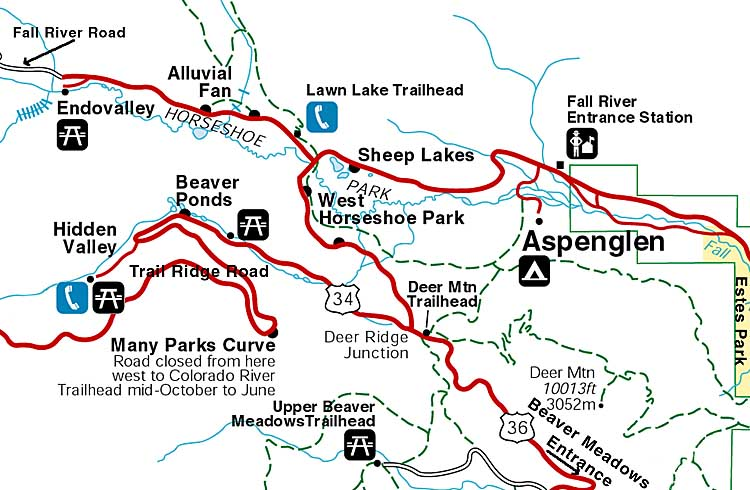
Courtesy of Rocky Mountain National Park

The road to the western portion of Horseshoe Park leads to West Horseshoe Park, a trailhead to 4.5 miles (7.2 km) Lawn Lake trail, the Alluvial Fan, Endovalley Picnic Area, and Old Fall River Road. The Lawn Lake trail follows the Roaring River to Lawn Lake and Crystal Lake. During the winter, there is cross-country skiing and snowshoeing through Endovalley. Little Horseshoe Park, an overlook near Deer Ridge Junction, and Fan Lake are also located within Horseshoe park.

== Wildlife ==
Elk herd strolling through grassland and males fighting for dominance of the herd (video)

Elk graze in Western Horseshoe Park at dawn and dusk. In autumn, males make mating calls and engage in fights with other bull elk to establish dominance among the herd.

A large wetland supports a variety of birds, including robins, mountain bluebirds, red-winged blackbirds, warblers, hummingbirds, warbling vireos, song sparrows, and thrushes. Due to environmental damage by tourists that reduced the size of the sanctuary, the wetlands were conferred protective status in 1972.
