= Rainbow Falls (Manitou Springs, Colorado) =

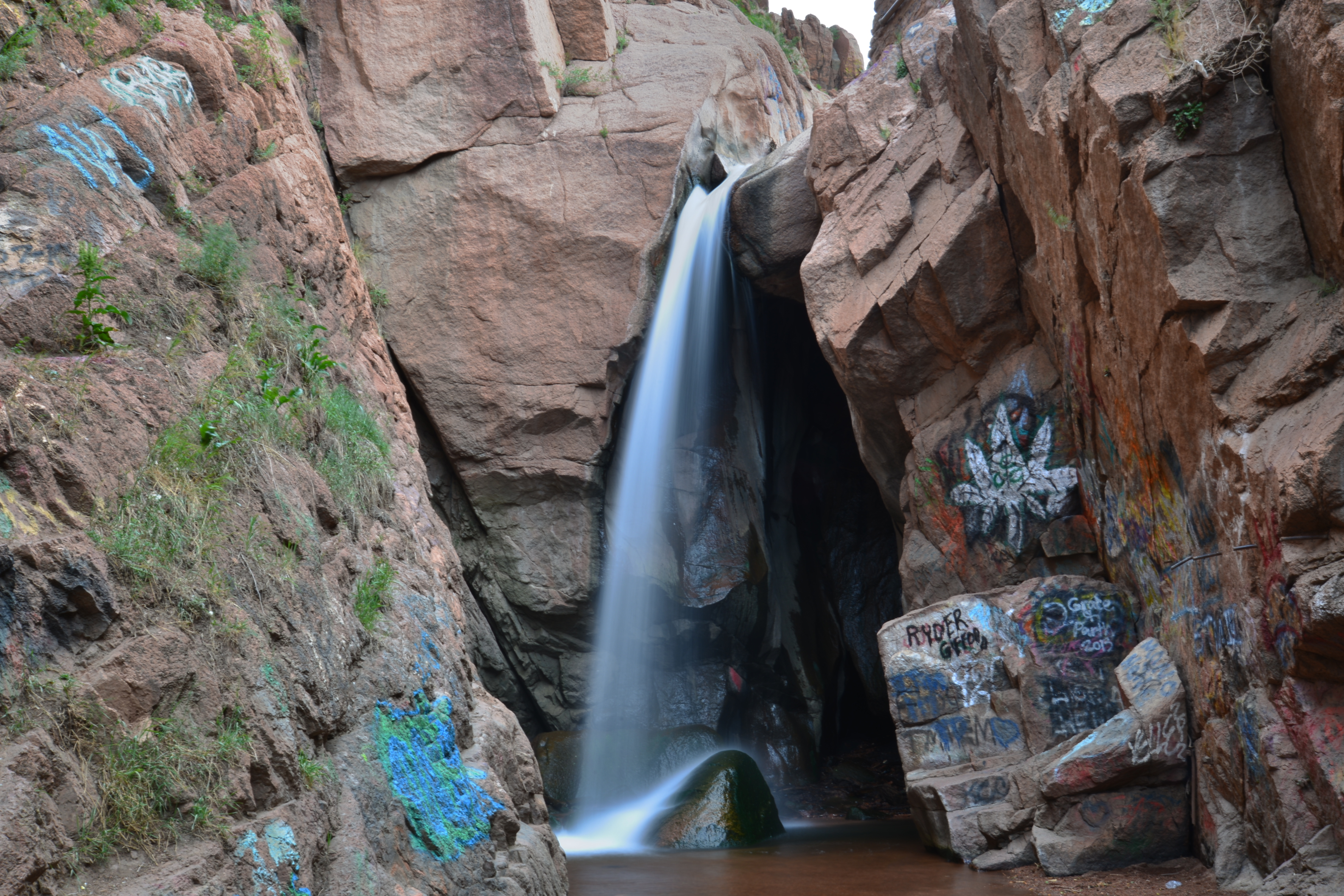
- The falls beneath the Manitou Avenue overpass just before merging with HWY 24

- Location within Colorado
- Location: El Paso County, Colorado, USA
- Coordinates: 38°52′12″N 104°55′33″W
- Type: Single
- Total height: 45 feet (14 m)
- Number of drops: 1
- Longest drop: 45 feet (14 m)
- Watercourse: Fountain Creek

Rainbow Falls (informally known as Graffiti Falls) is a waterfall located on Fountain Creek in Manitou Springs, Colorado. The falls' plunge is located beneath a bridge that links Manitou Avenue to Highway 24.

The trailhead to the falls is located on a 180-degree bend on Serpentine Drive, about 1/2 mile (0.80 km) off of Highway 24 across from the entrance to the Cave of the Winds. The falls were closed in 2013 for improvement from the El Paso County Parks Department, but have since reopened with a concrete walkway that snakes along the river.

== Images ==
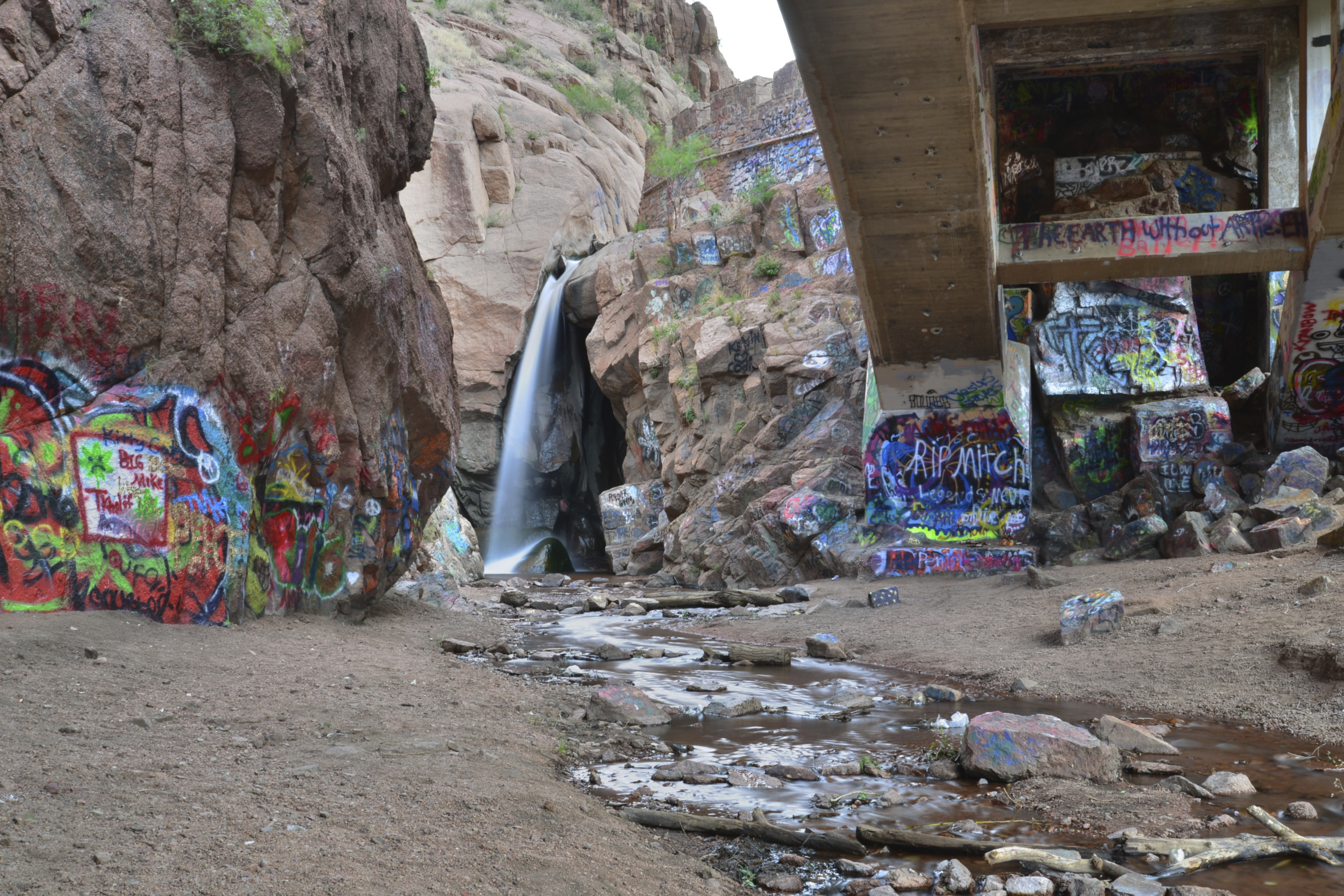

== See also ==
- List of waterfalls
- List of waterfalls in Colorado
