= Roaring River (Colorado) =

River in Larimer County, Colorado, United States of America

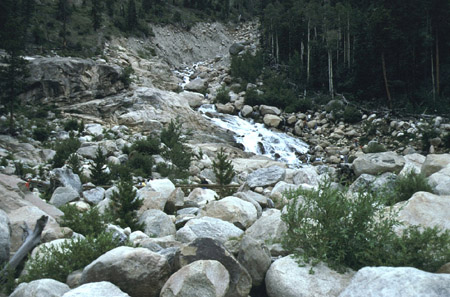
- The Roaring River meets the alluvial fan created by the Lawn Lake flood of 1982

Physical characteristics
- Source
  - coordinates: 40°28′15″N 105°38′48″W
  - elevation: 11,519 ft (3,511 m)
- Mouth
  - location: Confluence with Fall River
  - coordinates: 40°24′34″N 105°38′13″W
  - elevation: 8,563 ft (2,610 m)

Basin features
- Progression: Fall—Big Thompson— South Platte—Platte— Missouri—Mississippi

The Roaring River is a 6.5-mile-long (10.5 km) tributary of the Fall River in Larimer County, Colorado. The river's source is Crystal Lake in the Mummy Range of Rocky Mountain National Park The river flows through Lawn Lake before a confluence with the Fall River in Horseshoe Park. The collapse of the Lawn Lake Dam in 1982 scoured the river's channel and deposited an alluvial fan of debris in Horseshoe Park.

== See also ==
- List of rivers of Colorado
