= Fish Creek Falls =

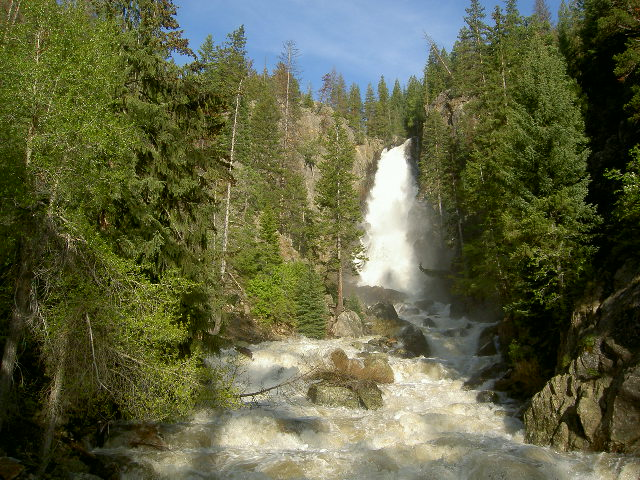
- Fish Creek Falls, June 2005

- Location within Colorado
- Location: Routt County, Colorado, U.S.
- Coordinates: 40.481644°N 106.771159°W
- Total height: 283 feet (86 m)
- Watercourse: Fish Creek

Fish Creek Falls is a waterfall located about 5 miles to the east of Steamboat Springs, Colorado, in Routt National Forest. Fish Creek runs from several small lakes in the Rabbit Ears Range of Colorado.

In the summertime, the road to Fish Creek Falls often becomes clogged in mid-afternoon with tourists wanting to see the 283-foot-tall (86 m) waterfall. There are two hiking trails from the parking lot at the end of Fish Creek Fall Road. One is 1/4 of a mile (400 m) and goes through several Aspen groves with the occasional Subalpine Fir. It ends at a viewing station where the entirety of the falls can be seen. The other trail goes straight down into the U-shaped valley formed by glaciers. As it nears the bottom of the valley, one can hear the rushing sound of water over the fall and see beautiful Fish Creek. The trail continues on to Upper Fish Creek Falls and then on to the Wyoming Trail, a long trail running the northwestern mountains of Colorado to Wyoming. The falls provide a great place for ice climbing in the winter when 300+ inches of snow (7.6 m) fall on the mountains east of Steamboat Springs.

== Image gallery ==
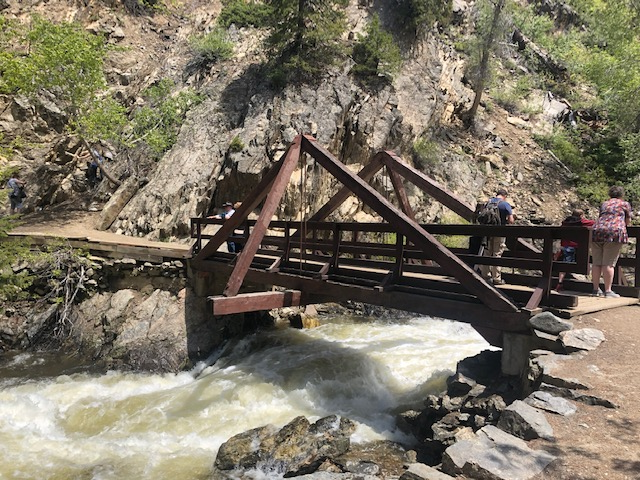
The footbridge at the base of Fish Creek Falls

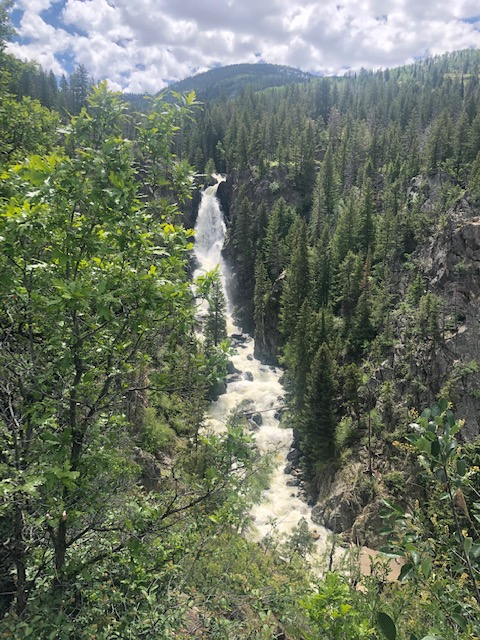
Fish Creek Falls from above on a trail

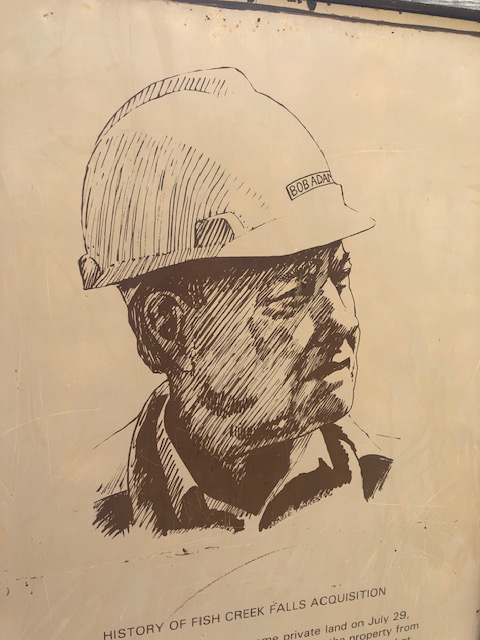
Picture of benefactor Bob Adams near Fish Creek Falls

== See also ==
- List of waterfalls
- Waterfalls of Colorado
