= Treasure Falls =

Waterfall in Mineral County, Colorado, United States

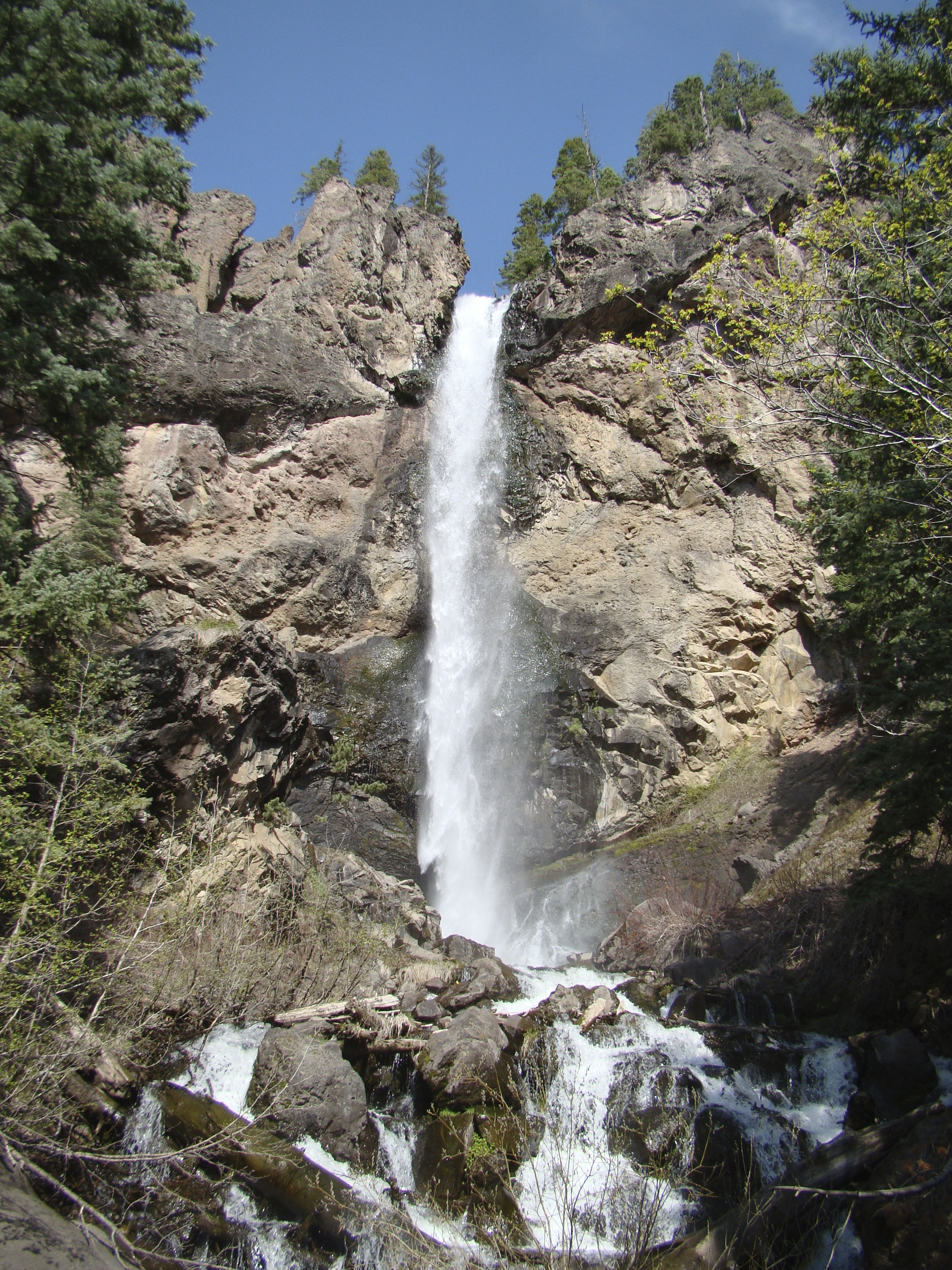
- Treasure Falls from the lower footbridge

- Location within Colorado
- Location: San Juan National Forest, Mineral County, Colorado
- Coordinates: 37°26′35″N 106°52′26″W
- Type: Single
- Total height: 105 feet (32 m)
- Number of drops: 1
- Longest drop: 105 feet (32 m)
- Watercourse: Fall Creek

Treasure Falls is a waterfall in the San Juan Mountains, within Mineral County, Colorado, United States. It is located in the San Juan National Forest, off U.S. Route 160, about 15 miles (24 km) northeast of Pagosa Springs. The falls are named after a local legend about "a treasure of gold" buried in the mountain that the falls plunge from.

== Access ==
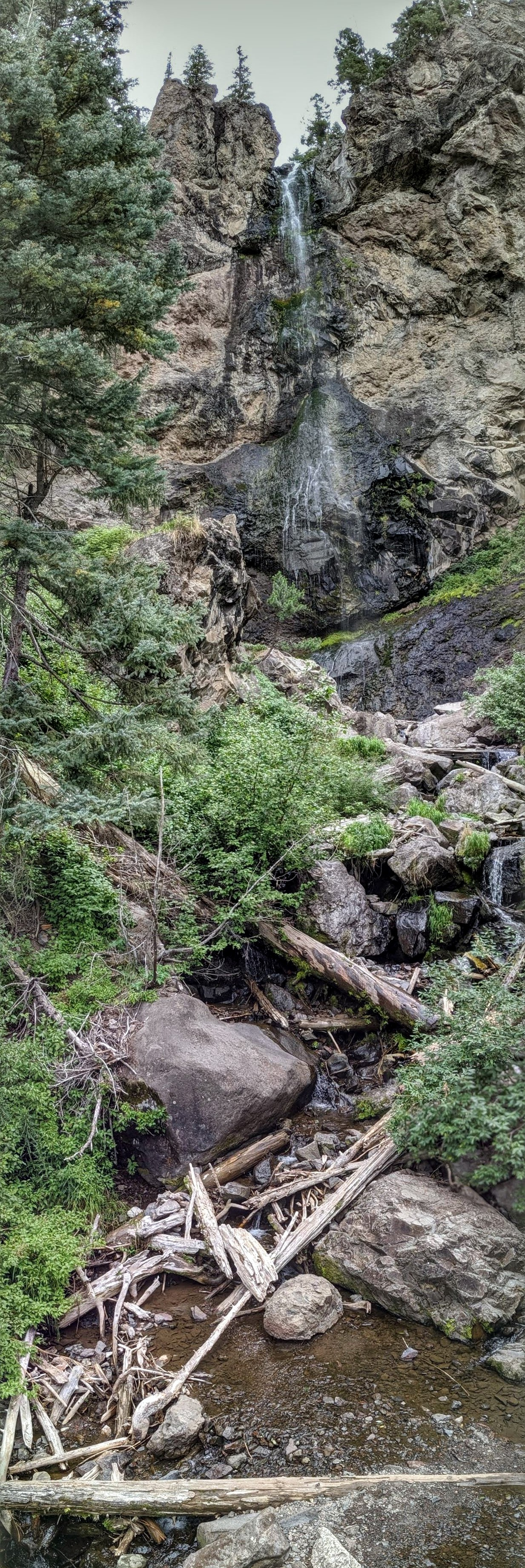
Vertical panoramic view from the foot bridge

There is a trailhead off Highway 160. The falls are somewhat visible from the parking lot, and a short and moderately steep hike of about 300 feet (91 m) of elevation gain will bring hikers to the base of the falls, where there is a foot bridge for viewing. A switchback trail will take hikers closer to the plunge base, called the "Misty Deck" where hikers can view and feel the spray of the falls.

== Gallery ==
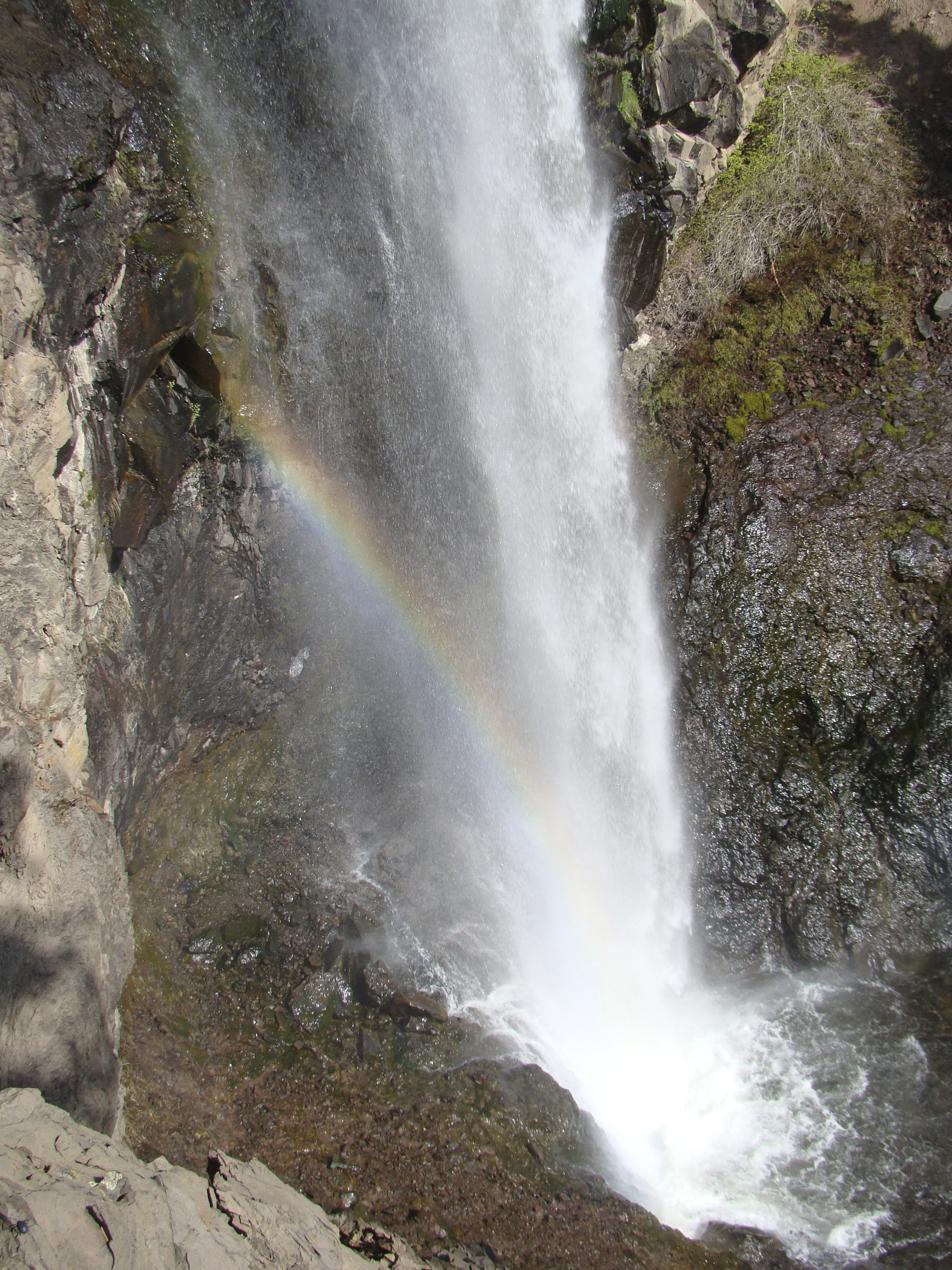
Rainbow formed in the plunge mist

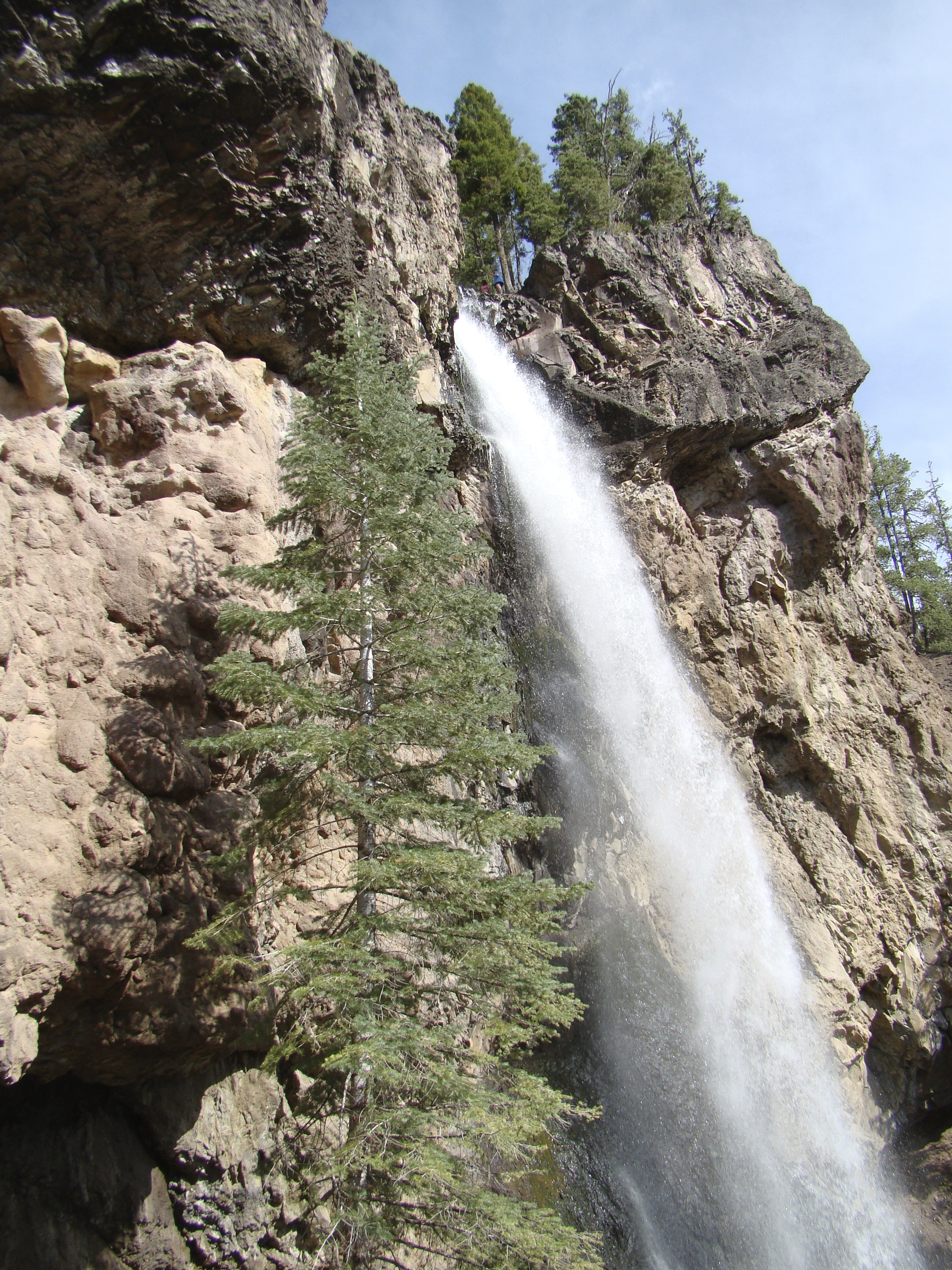
The plunge with a large tree to show the scale

== See also ==
- List of waterfalls
- Waterfalls of Colorado
