= Mount Chiquita =

Mountain in Colorado, United States

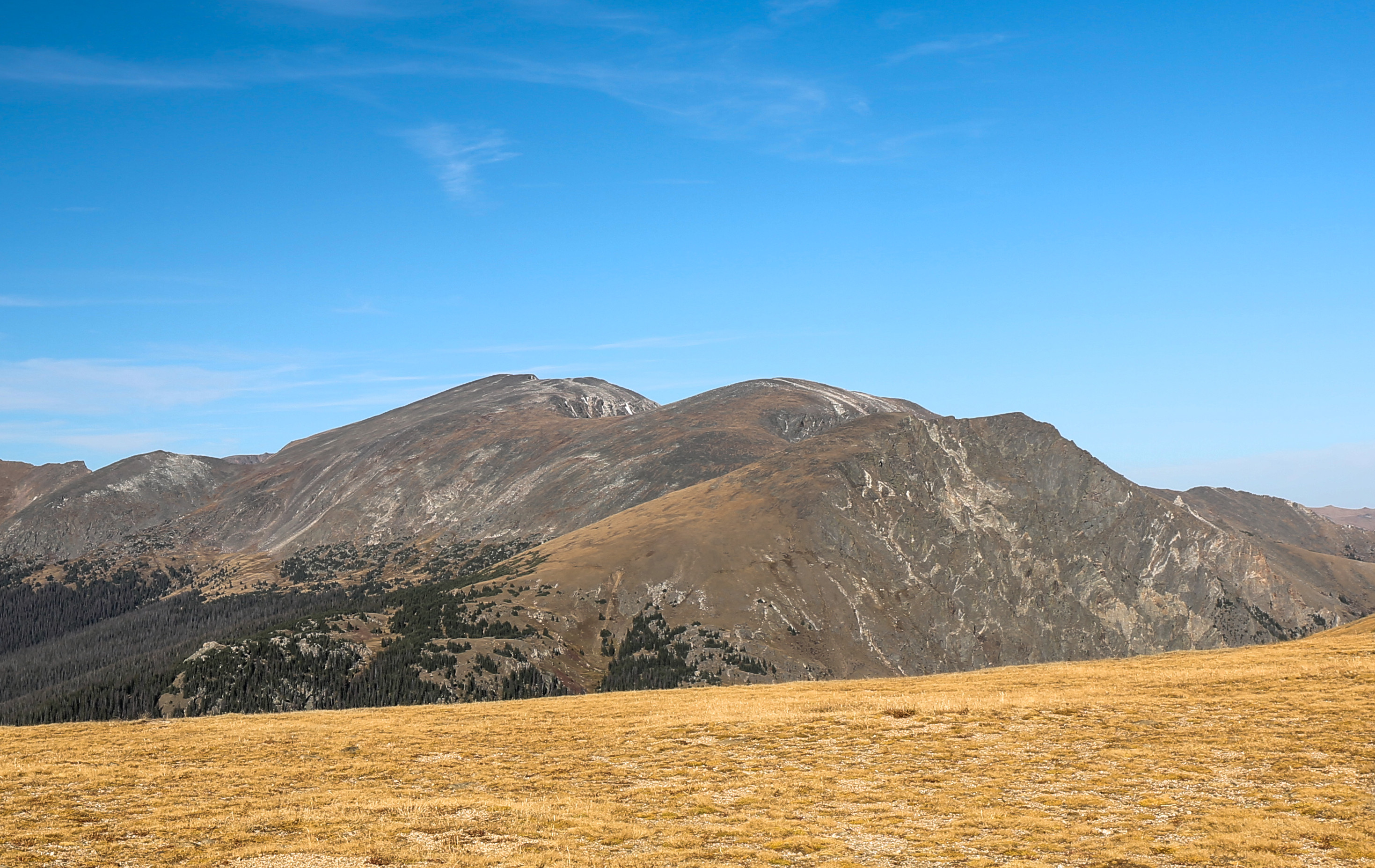
- Mounts Ypsilon (left of center), Chiquita (center), and Chapin (right)

Highest point
- Elevation: 13,075 ft (3,985 m)
- Prominence: 283 ft (86 m)
- Isolation: 0.99 mi (1.59 km)
- Coordinates: 40°26′38″N 105°41′20″W

Geography
- Location within Colorado
- Location: Rocky Mountain National Park, Larimer County, Colorado, U.S.
- Parent range: Mummy Range
- Topo map(s): USGS 7.5' topographic map Trail Ridge, Colorado

Mount Chiquita is a mountain summit in the Mummy Range of the Rocky Mountains of North America. The 13,075-foot (3,985 m) thirteener is located in Rocky Mountain National Park, 9.8 miles (15.7 km) northwest by west (bearing 298°) of the Town of Estes Park in Larimer County, Colorado, United States.

Tourists can reach Mount Chiquita via Chapin Pass which is an 8.0 kilometer out and back trail located near Estes Park, Colorado that features beautiful wild flowers and is rated as moderate. The trail is primarily used for hiking and running and is accessible year-round.

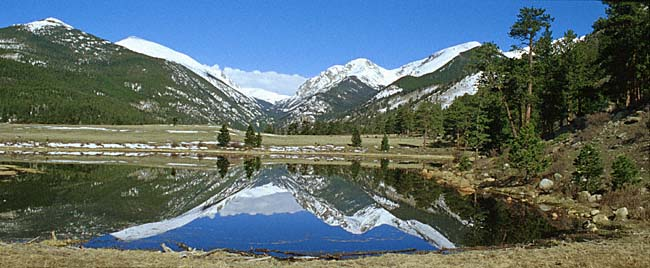
Sundance Mountain (12,466 feet) on left, Mount Chapin (12,454 feet) and Mount Chiquita reflect in one of the Sheep Lakes in Horseshoe Park shortly after the ice had melted in the spring. Courtesy of Rocky Mountain National Park.

== See also ==
- List of Colorado mountain ranges
- List of Colorado mountain summits
  - List of Colorado fourteeners
  - List of Colorado 4000 meter prominent summits
  - List of the most prominent summits of Colorado
- List of Colorado county high points
