= Zapata Falls =

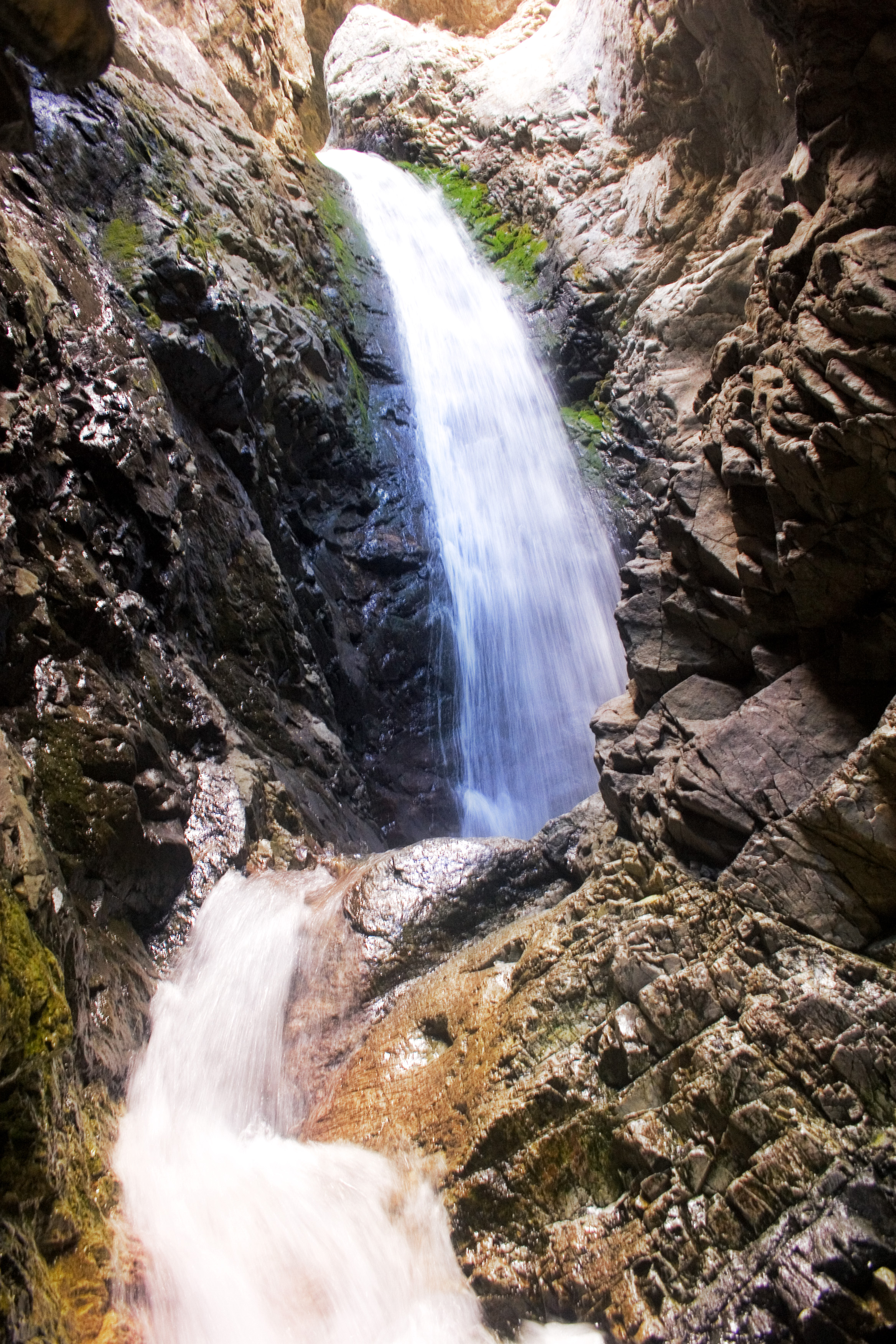
- Zapata Falls

- Location within Colorado
- Location: San Luis Valley, Colorado
- Coordinates: 37°37′08″N 105°33′11″W
- Total height: 30 feet (9.1 m)
- Number of drops: 1
- Watercourse: South Zapata Creek

Zapata Falls is a waterfall located in the San Luis Valley near the base of the Sangre de Cristo Mountains on Bureau of Land Management land adjacent to Rio Grande National Forest and south of Great Sand Dunes National Park and Preserve in Alamosa County, Colorado. The waterfall has a drop of about 30 feet (9 m). Access to this waterfall entails a mildly steep 0.5-mile (800 m) hike. Viewing the falls requires fording the stream and climbing rocks.

Black swifts nest near the falls, one of the few known breeding sites for this species in Colorado.

== See also ==
- List of waterfalls
- Waterfalls of Colorado
