= North Clear Creek Falls =

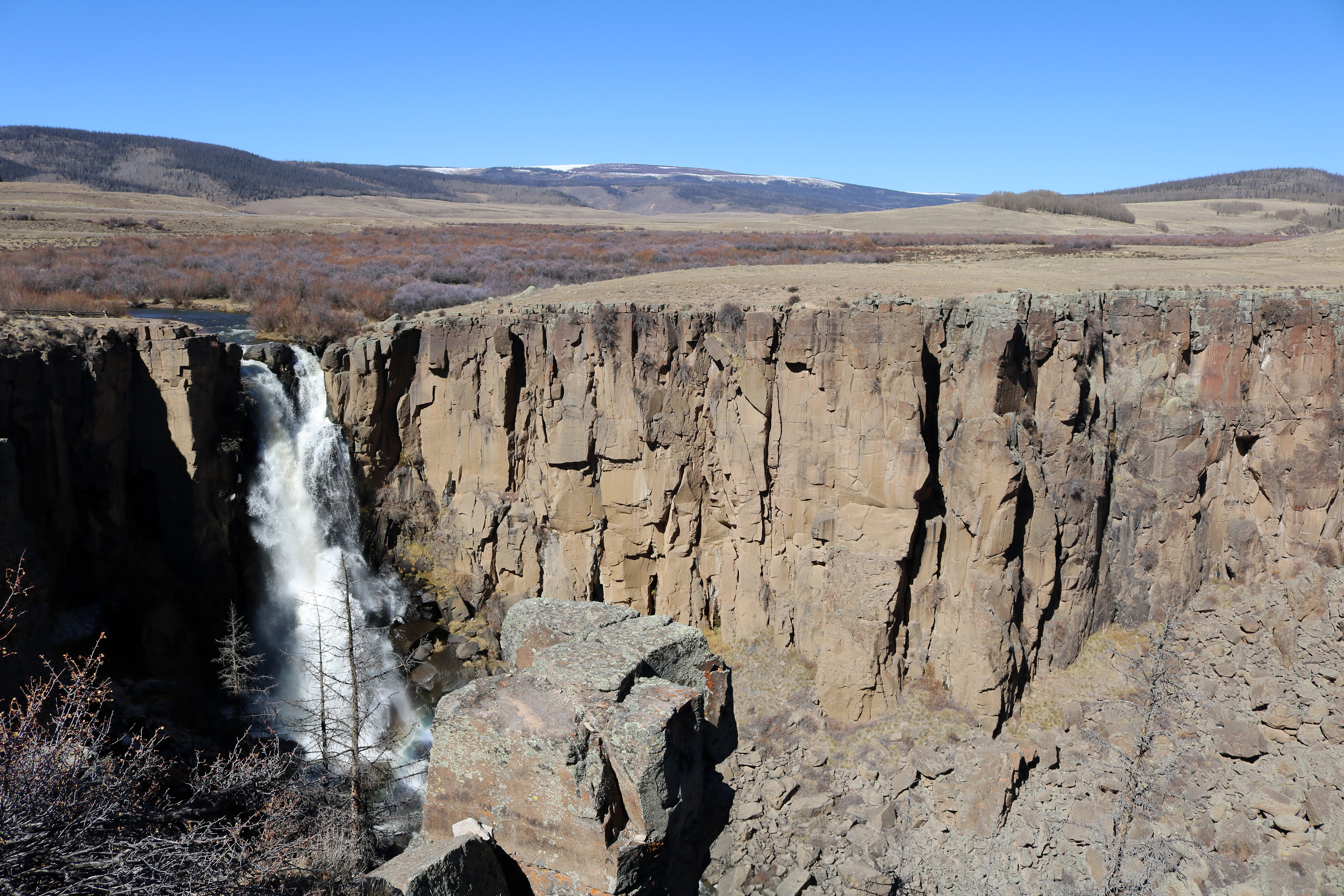
- The falls in autumn, 2018

- Location within Colorado
- Location: Hinsdale County, Colorado
- Coordinates: 37°50′57″N 107°9′1.18″W
- Type: segmented, horsetail
- Elevation: 10,013 feet (3,052 meters)
- Number of drops: 1
- Watercourse: North Clear Creek

North Clear Creek Falls is a waterfall in Hinsdale County, Colorado, located within the Rio Grande National Forest. North Clear Creek is a tributary of the Rio Grande. The waterfall flows over a deck of Nelson Mountain tuff, solidified ash from a volcano in the San Juan volcanic field that erupted about 27 million years ago.

== Overlook ==
An overlook area with a parking lot and a short trail is located about a half-mile from Colorado State Highway 149 on a paved county road. Visitors can observe and photograph the waterfall from the overlook site. It features picnic tables and a vault toilet. The site is wheelchair accessible and features a trail to the top of a nearby bluff.

== Climate ==
The Santa Maria Reservoir weather station is roughly 3 miles (4.83 km) south of North Clear Creek Falls. Santa Maria Reservoir has a subarctic climate (Köppen Dfc).

Climate data for Santa Maria Reservoir, Colorado, 1991–2020 normals, 2006-2020 snowfall: 9687ft (2953m)
Month	Jan	Feb	Mar	Apr	May	Jun	Jul	Aug	Sep	Oct	Nov	Dec	Year
Record high °F (°C)	55 (13)	56 (13)	60 (16)	67 (19)	73 (23)	84 (29)	83 (28)	80 (27)	79 (26)	73 (23)	63 (17)	53 (12)	84 (29)
Mean maximum °F (°C)	48 (9)	50 (10)	54 (12)	61 (16)	68 (20)	78 (26)	79 (26)	76 (24)	74 (23)	67 (19)	59 (15)	48 (9)	79 (26)
Mean daily maximum °F (°C)	34.8 (1.6)	36.4 (2.4)	41.8 (5.4)	47.6 (8.7)	57.9 (14.4)	68.1 (20.1)	72.5 (22.5)	69.7 (20.9)	64.3 (17.9)	54.8 (12.7)	42.9 (6.1)	33.8 (1.0)	52.0 (11.1)
Daily mean °F (°C)	18.3 (−7.6)	19.9 (−6.7)	26.8 (−2.9)	33.2 (0.7)	42.3 (5.7)	51.1 (10.6)	56.4 (13.6)	54.3 (12.4)	48.5 (9.2)	38.7 (3.7)	28.0 (−2.2)	18.0 (−7.8)	36.3 (2.4)
Mean daily minimum °F (°C)	1.7 (−16.8)	3.4 (−15.9)	11.7 (−11.3)	18.8 (−7.3)	26.6 (−3.0)	34.1 (1.2)	40.2 (4.6)	38.8 (3.8)	32.6 (0.3)	22.6 (−5.2)	13.1 (−10.5)	2.1 (−16.6)	20.5 (−6.4)
Mean minimum °F (°C)	−16 (−27)	−15 (−26)	−7 (−22)	5 (−15)	15 (−9)	25 (−4)	33 (1)	32 (0)	22 (−6)	8 (−13)	−5 (−21)	−16 (−27)	−19 (−28)
Record low °F (°C)	−29 (−34)	−20 (−29)	−13 (−25)	−2 (−19)	4 (−16)	21 (−6)	27 (−3)	28 (−2)	14 (−10)	−5 (−21)	−16 (−27)	−23 (−31)	−29 (−34)
Average precipitation inches (mm)	1.09 (28)	1.14 (29)	1.05 (27)	1.55 (39)	1.02 (26)	0.83 (21)	2.31 (59)	2.97 (75)	2.13 (54)	1.51 (38)	0.91 (23)	1.05 (27)	17.56 (446)
Average snowfall inches (cm)	15.3 (39)	16.1 (41)	14.6 (37)	10.3 (26)	5.3 (13)	0.0 (0.0)	0.0 (0.0)	trace	1.2 (3.0)	5.6 (14)	12.0 (30)	20.0 (51)	100.4 (254)
Source 1: NOAA
Source 2: XMACIS (snowfall, records & monthly max/mins)

== See also ==
- List of waterfalls
- List of waterfalls in Colorado
