= Chalk Lake =

Lake in Colorado, United States

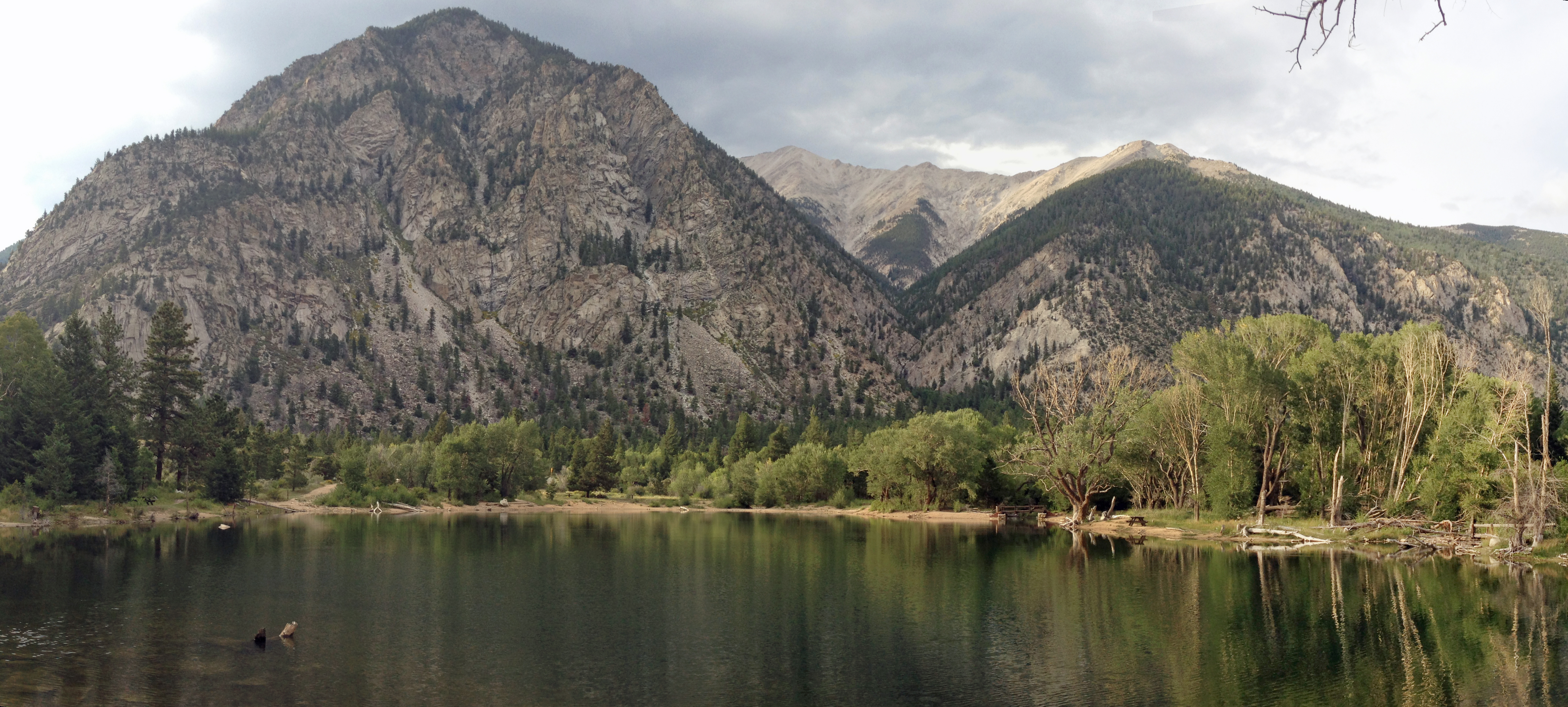
- Chalk Lake with Mount Princeton in the background

- Location within Colorado Location within the United States
- Location: Chaffee County, Colorado
- Coordinates: 38.7110262°N 106.2341113°W
- Basin countries: United States
- Max. length: 0.15 mi (0.24 km)
- Max. width: 0.05 mi (0.080 km)
- Surface elevation: 8,700 ft (2,700 m)

Chalk Lake is a small lake in Chaffee County, Colorado, United States, adjacent to Chalk Creek in San Isabel National Forest. The lake and surrounding area is a day-use area along road 162 across Chalk Creek from the Chalk Creek Campground, and a fee is charged for use of the lake. Chalk Lake is directly north of Mount Antero and directly south of Mount Princeton. The Denver, South Park and Pacific Railroad grade is above the south side of the lake below Mount Antero.
