= Helen Hunt (hair stylist) =

Helen Hunt was a hair stylist in Hollywood movies from the 1930s up to 1967, when she worked on Guess Who's Coming to Dinner. She was the chief hair stylist for Columbia Pictures.

Hunt fell into her career by accident. She was working as a stenographer for a costume company in Omaha, Nebraska. She began washing and arranging the company's wigs on her own time because they were being neglected. When she went into a shop to look over a display of wigs, she was offered a job by the owner, George Westmore of Hollywood. This eventually led to a position with Columbia Pictures. According to IMDb, the first film with which she was involved (uncredited) was the 1935 Party Wire, starring Jean Arthur.

She worked with Rita Hayworth before the latter became a star. According to some sources, it was Hunt who came up with the idea to dye Hayworth's black hair auburn. She also arranged for the painful, lengthy electrolysis that raised Hayworth's hairline. For the 1946 film noir Gilda, Hunt stated, "I got fan mail - and hate mail - about Rita's hair! Some clergymen declared that I would go to hell for contributing to evil because of Rita's hair in Gilda!" When Orson Welles insisted on shortening the actress's long hair (and dyeing it blonde) for The Lady from Shanghai (1947), Hunt was flown in from New York, where she was on her honeymoon, to do the cutting.

During the course of her career, she also styled such stars as Irene Dunne, Rosalind Russell, Loretta Young and Evelyn Keyes. Cult movie actress Pamela Duncan credited Hunt with bringing her to the attention of the casting department of Columbia.

== Selected filmography ==
- Footsteps in the Dark (1941)
- Cover Girl (1944), with Rita Hayworth
- Gilda (1946)
- Dead Reckoning (1947), with Lauren Bacall
- The Lady from Shanghai (1947) (uncredited)
- In a Lonely Place (1950), with Gloria Grahame
- Born Yesterday (1950), with Judy Holliday
- The Barefoot Mailman (1951), with Terry Moore and Ellen Corby
- The Big Heat (1953), with Gloria Grahame and Jocelyn Brando
- From Here to Eternity (1953), with Deborah Kerr and Donna Reed
- Salome (1953), with Rita Hayworth
- Miss Sadie Thompson (1953), with Rita Hayworth
- The Caine Mutiny (1954)
- The Solid Gold Cadillac (1956), with Judy Holliday
- Pal Joey (1957), with Rita Hayworth and Kim Novak
- Bell, Book and Candle (1958), with Kim Novak
- Gidget (1959)
- A Raisin in the Sun (1961), with Ruby Dee
- Guess Who's Coming to Dinner (1967), with Katharine Hepburn
