= Helen Hunt Falls =

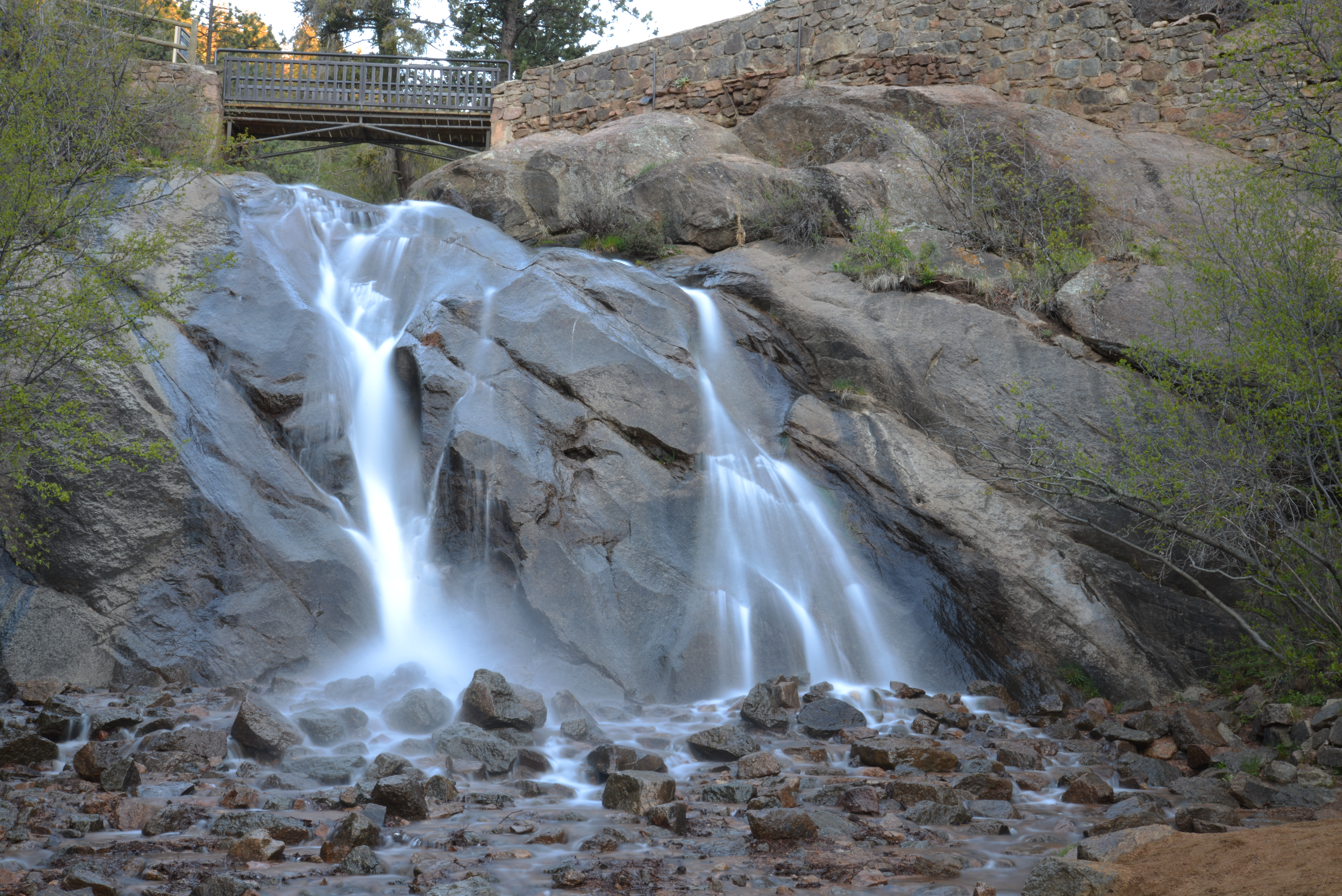
- Helen Hunt Falls, May '13

- Location within Colorado
- Location: Colorado Springs, Colorado, United States
- Coordinates: 38°47′19″N 104°54′11″W
- Type: Single
- Total height: 35 feet (11 m)
- Number of drops: 1
- Longest drop: 35 feet (11 m)
- Watercourse: Cheyenne Creek

Helen Hunt Falls is a waterfall located on Cheyenne Creek in the North Cheyenne Cañon Park of Colorado Springs, Colorado.

The falls are located on North Cheyenne Creek immediately off North Cheyenne Canyon Road in the North Cheyenne Canyon Park. There is parking for about 30 vehicles at the falls and it becomes crowded early during summer months when visits to the canyon are popular among locals and tourists. The Columbine Trail, which starts at the entrance of the Park by the Starsmore Visitor and Nature Center, terminates at Helen Hunt Falls. Visitors can hike a short distance of about 2/3 of a mile (1.1 km) up a moderately steep trail above Helen Hunt Falls to reach Silver Cascade Falls.

The falls are named in honor of Helen Maria Hunt Jackson (October 15, 1830 – August 12, 1885), a United States poet and writer who became an activist on behalf of improved treatment of Native Americans by the U.S. government. She died in San Francisco, California in 1885 and was later buried in Colorado Springs.

== Images ==
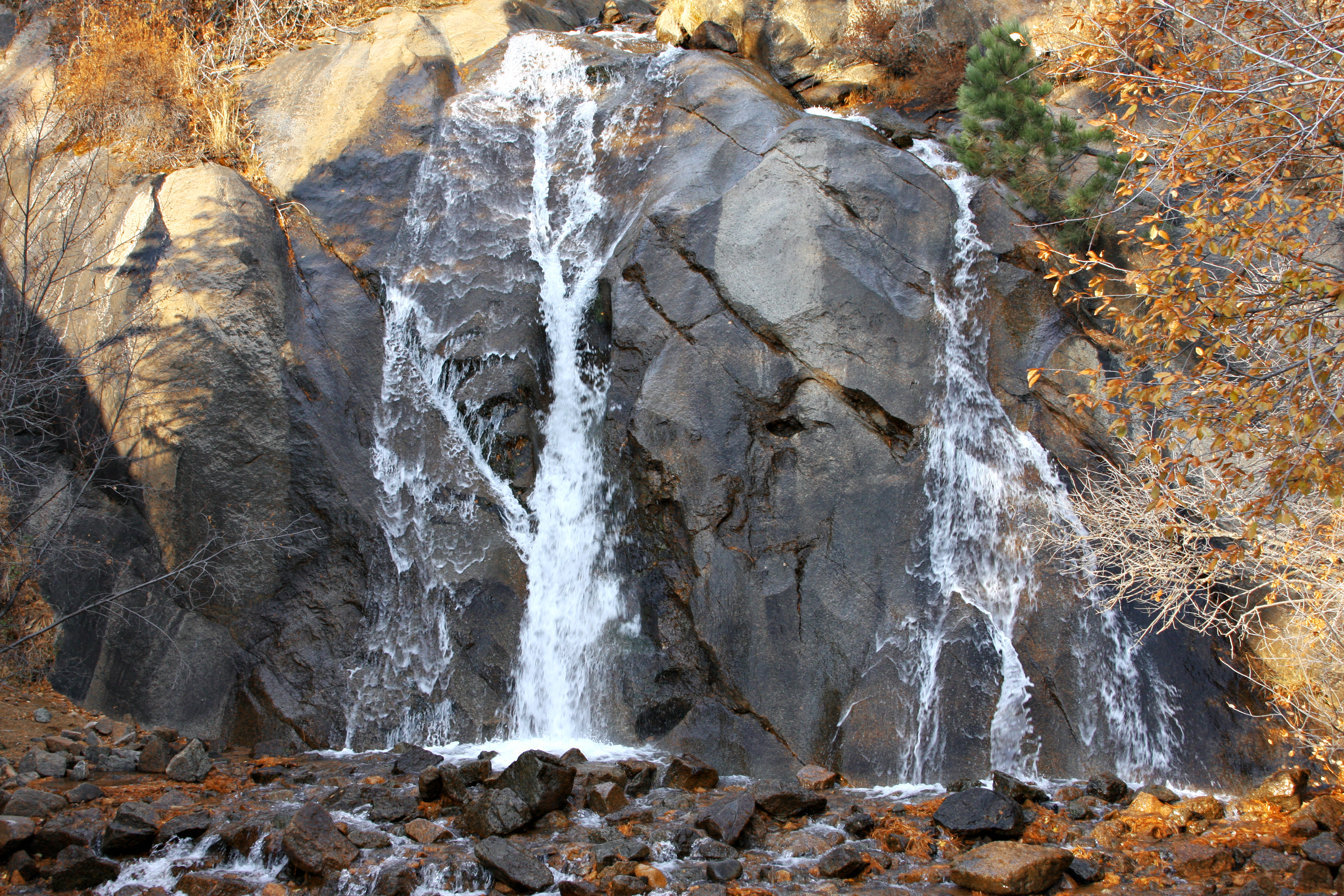
The falls in autumn

== See also ==
- List of waterfalls
- Waterfalls of Colorado
