= Ypsilon Mountain =

Mountain in Colorado, United States

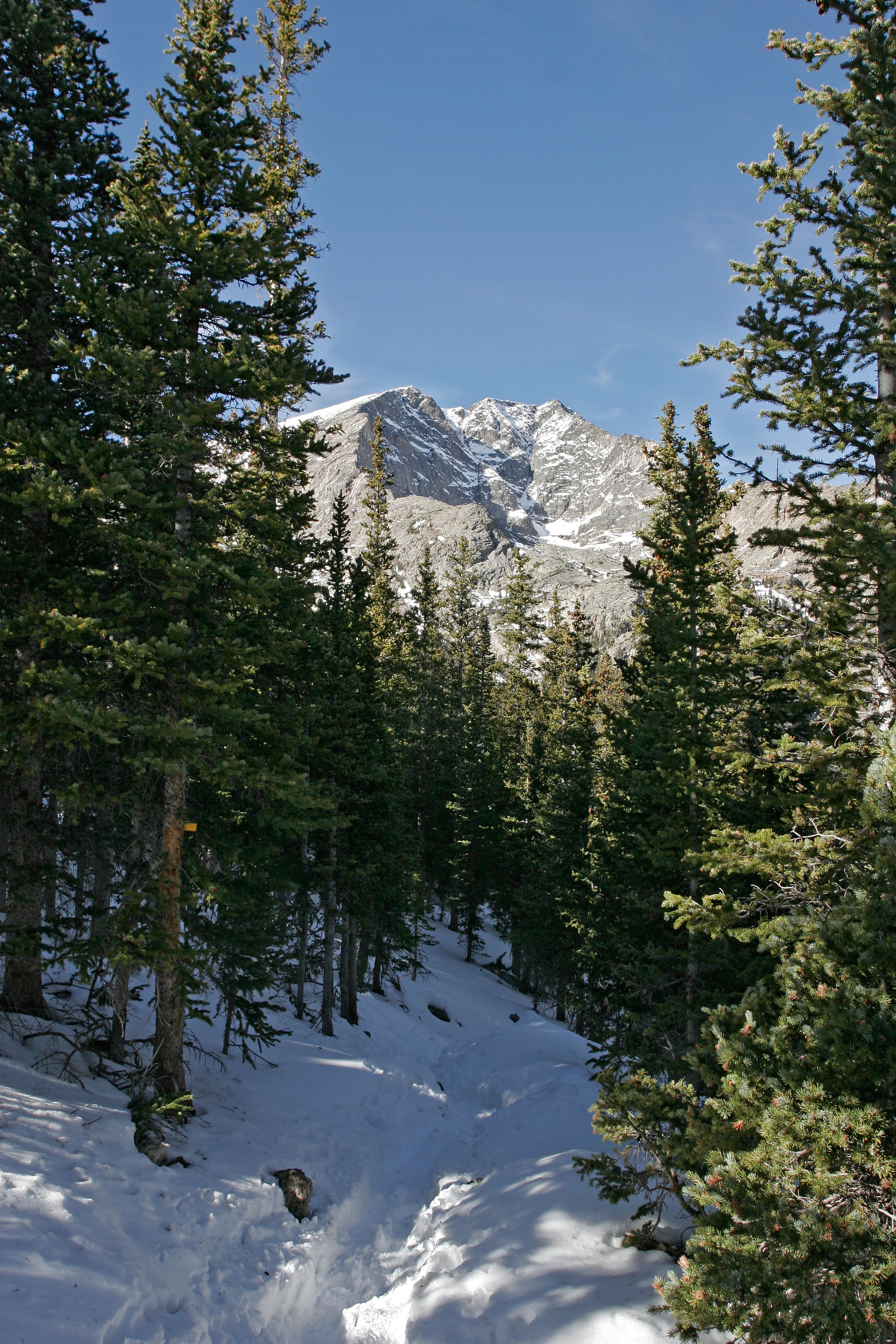
- View of Ypsilon Mountain (peak on right) from the Ypsilon Lake Trail just before reaching Chipmunk Lake.

Highest point
- Elevation: 13,520 ft (4,121 m)
- Prominence: 1,116 ft (340 m)
- Isolation: 2.64 mi (4.25 km)
- Coordinates: 40°27′25″N 105°40′52″W

Geography
- Location within Colorado
- Location: Rocky Mountain National Park, Larimer County, Colorado, U.S.
- Parent range: Mummy Range
- Topo map(s): USGS 7.5' topographic map Winfield, Colorado

Ypsilon Mountain, elevation 13,520 ft (4,121 m), is in the Mummy Range of Rocky Mountain National Park in northern Colorado. The mountain, along with Mount Chiquita, is most easily accessed from a trailhead on Fall River Road to the south. The mountain was named in 1887 after the Greek letter Ypsilon by Mrs. Frederick H. Chapin, who observed the Y-shaped snowfield on its east face.

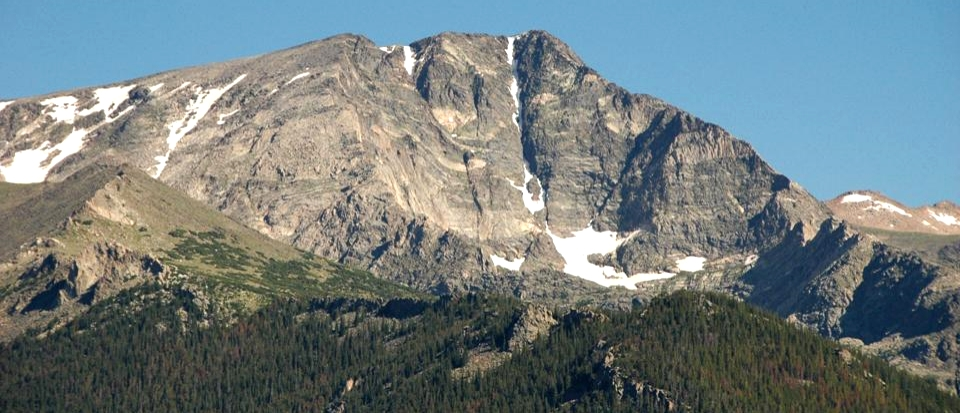
Ypsilon Mountain, southeast aspect

== Climbing ==
Ypsilon Mountain offers several climbing areas for mountaineers and rock climbers.

In 2023, Bailee Mulholland was fatally injured when she fell 500 feet while free-soloing the Four Aces of Blitzen Ridge on Ypsilon Mountain.

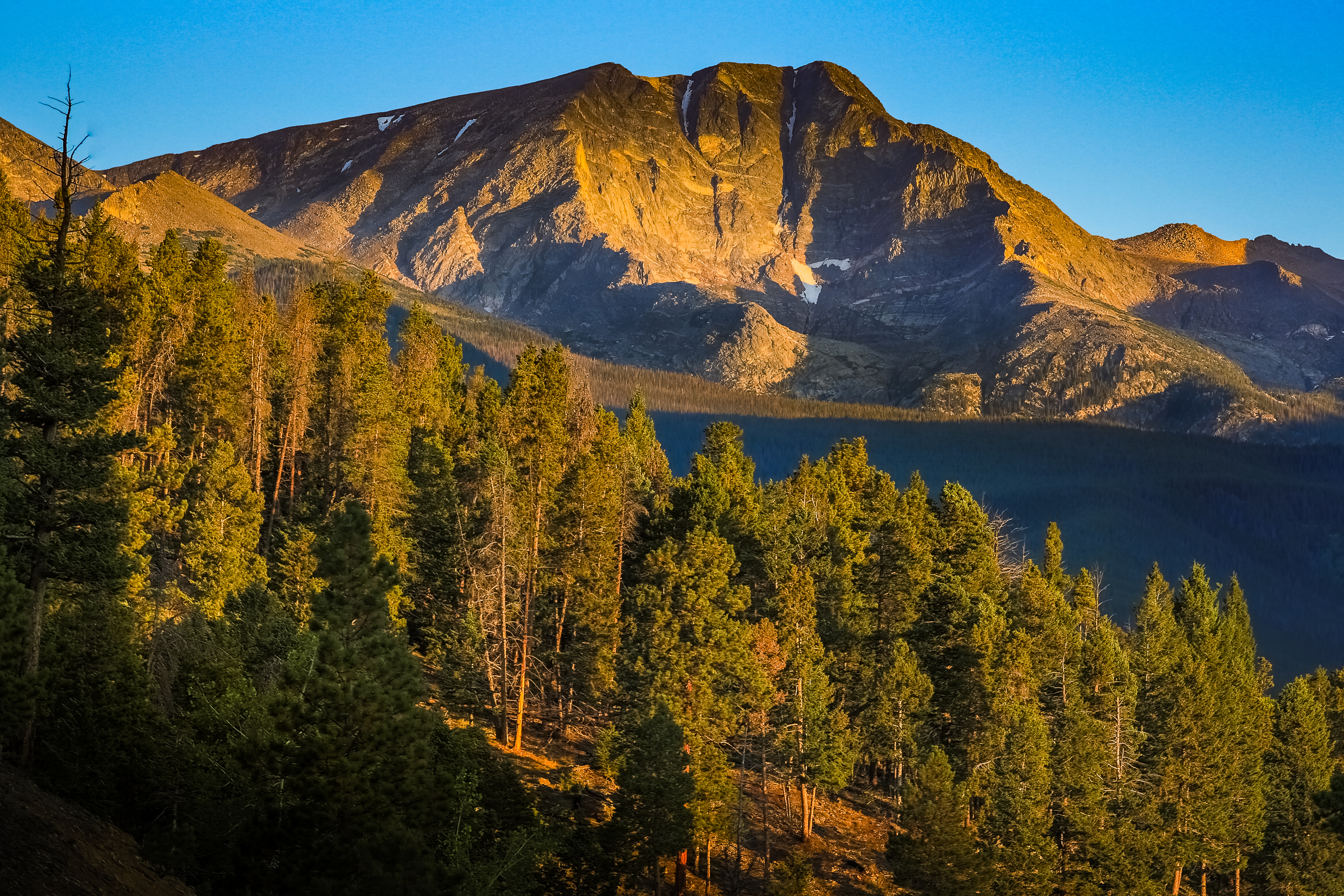
Ypsilon Mountain, morning light

== See also ==
- List of Colorado mountain ranges
- List of Colorado mountain summits
  - List of Colorado fourteeners
  - List of Colorado 4000 meter prominent summits
  - List of the most prominent summits of Colorado
- List of Colorado county high points
