= Fall River (Larimer County, Colorado) =

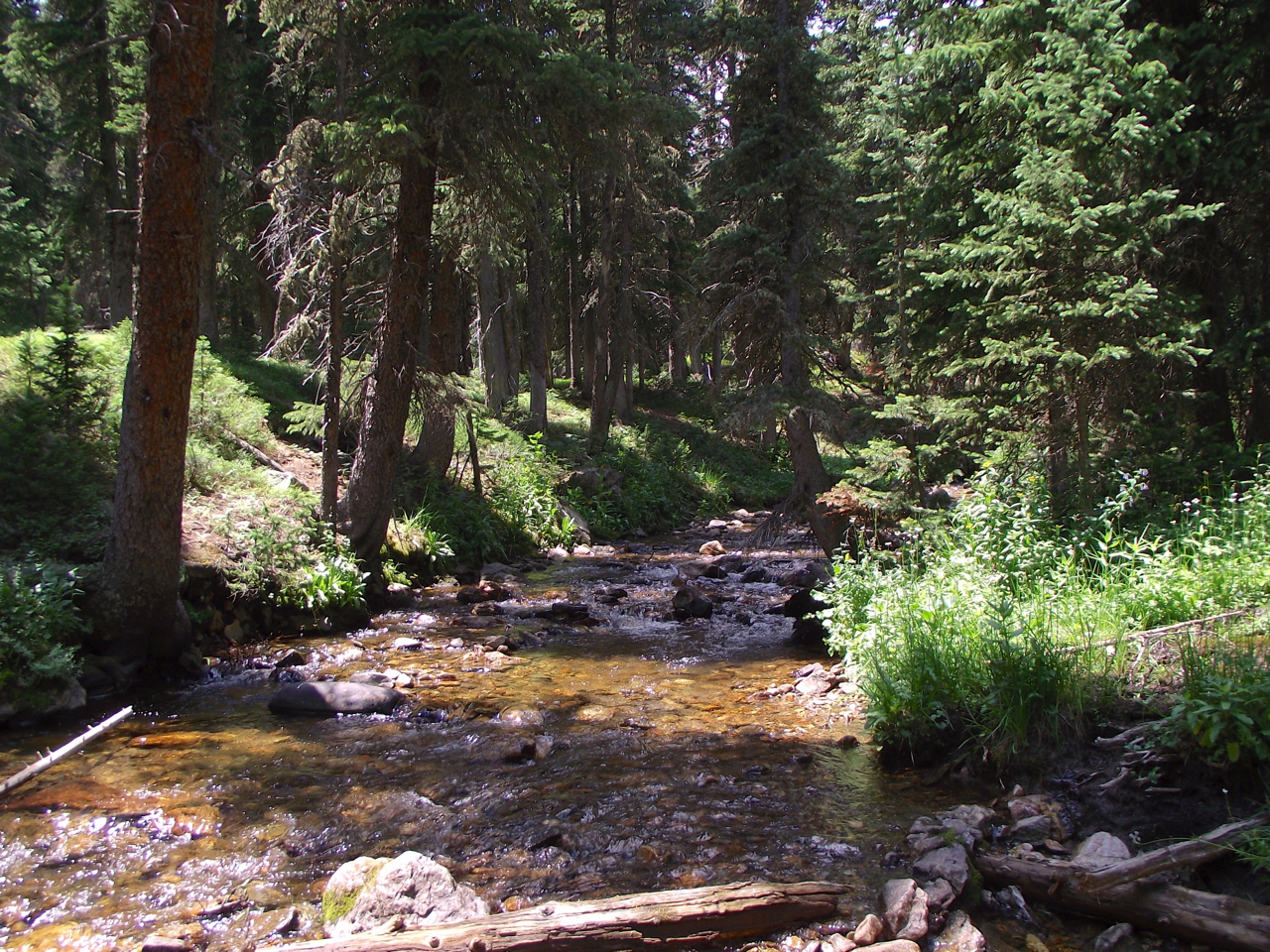
- Fall River

Physical characteristics
- Source
  - coordinates: 40°26′16″N 105°45′12″W
- Mouth
  - location: Confluence with Big Thompson
  - coordinates: 40°22′33″N 105°31′18″W
  - elevation: 7,523 ft (2,293 m)

Basin features
- Progression: Big Thompson— South Platte—Platte— Missouri—Mississippi

The Fall River is a 17.1-mile-long (27.5 km) tributary of the Big Thompson River in Larimer County, Colorado. The river's source is near the Alpine Visitor Center in Rocky Mountain National Park. It flows down a canyon and over Chasm Falls before a confluence with the Big Thompson in Estes Park.

== See also ==
- List of rivers of Colorado
