= Hallett (surname) =

Hallett is a surname. Notable people with the surname include:

- Andy Hallett (1975–2009), American actor
- Benjamin F. Hallett (1797–1862), was a Massachusetts lawyer, first chairman of the Democratic National Committee
- Cecil Hallett (1899–1994), British trade unionist
- Christine Hallett (born 1949), British social scientist and academic
- Erick Hallett (born 2000), American football player
- George Hallett (disambiguation), several people
- Harold Foster Hallett (1886–1966), British philosopher
- Heather Hallett (born 1949), retired English judge of the Court of Appeal
- Howard Hallett (1890–1970), Australian rugby league footballer
- Job H. Hallett (1855–1940) founded J. Hallett and Son, South Australian brickmakers
- John Hallett (1772–1794) sailor on HMS Bounty, accompanied Bligh after mutiny
- John Hallett (Australian politician) (1917–1999) Western Australian politician
- John Hallett (South Australian politician), (1804–1868) businessman pastoralist and landowner
- Judith P. Hallett, professor of Classics in the University of Maryland
- Kevin Hallett (1929–2021), Australian swimmer
- Macauley Hallett, English rugby league footballer
- Mark Hallett (artist) (born 1947), illustrator specializing in dinosaurs
- Mark Hallett (historian) (born 1965), art historian specializing in British art
- Moses Hallett (1834–1913), US federal judge
- Samuel Hallett (1827–1864), railroad developer
- Stanley Hallett (1930–1998), American urban planner
- Thomas Hallett, son of Job H. Hallett

== See also ==
- Hallet (disambiguation)
- Hallett (disambiguation)
