= Hullett =

Hullett is a surname. Notable people with the surname include:

- Bill Hullett (1915–1982), English footballer
- Death of Gertrude Hullett (1906–1956), English murder victim
- Richmond William Hullett (1843–1914), English headmaster, explorer and plant collector

== See also ==
- Hallett (disambiguation)
- Haylett, surname
- Hullett Provincial Wildlife Area, wetland habitat in Ontario
- Nilse Hullet, cove in South Georgia and the South Sandwich Islands
