= Haylett =

Haylett is a surname. Notable people with the surname include:

- A. Eugene Haylett (1903–1965), American football and basketball coach
- Alice Haylett (1923–2004), American baseball player
- Ben Haylett (born 2001), British slalom canoeist
- Dane Haylett-Petty (born 1989), Australian rugby union footballer
- James Haylett (1825–1907), British lifeboatman
- John Haylett (1945–2019), British journalist
- Jon Haylett, British novelist
- Martha Haylett (born 1991), Australian politician
- Ross Haylett-Petty (born 1994), South African-born, Australian rugby union player
- Ward Haylett (1895–1990), American football player and coach

== See also ==
- Hallett (surname)
- Hullett, surname
