= Zaki Naguib Mahmoud =

Egyptian philosopher (1905–1993)

- زكي نجيب محمود
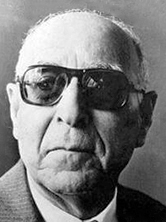
- Born: February 2, 1905; Damietta, Egypt
- Died: September 8, 1993 (aged 88); Cairo, Egypt
- Occupations: Philosopher, Professor
- Awards: The State Incentive Award (1960) Order of Merit (Egypt) (1970) Arab Educational, Scientific and Cultural Organization Award (1984) The American University in Cairo Honorary Doctorate (1985)

Academic background
- Education: Ghordone school
- Alma mater: Ain Shams University (BA, 1930); University College London (MA, 1944); King's College London (Ph.D, 1947)
- Thesis: Self-Determination (1947)
- Doctoral advisor: Harold Foster Hallett

Academic work
- Institutions: Cairo University, The University of South Carolina, Washington State University, Beirut Arab University, Kuwait University.
- Notable ideas: Logical positivism
- Influenced: Muhammad Abduh, Taha Hussein

Zaki Naguib Mahmoud (Arabic: زكي نجيب محمود) (February 2, 1905 – September 8, 1993) was an Egyptian intellectual and thinker, and is considered a pioneer in modern Arabic philosophical thought. He was described by Abbas Mahmoud al-Akkad as "the philosopher of authors and author of philosophers". Mahmoud adhered to logical positivism and adopted science interpretation with social motivations to reconcile the Arab tradition with modernism. Mahmoud defines the "Arab tradition" as the configuration of techniques by which our ancestors lived, and he viewed logical positivism as the spirit of "Modernism".

== Life ==
Zaki Naguib Mahmoud was born in the Damietta governorate in northern Egypt. There he attended the traditional Islamic school (kuttāb) where he memorized part of the Qur'an in his early years. He went to elementary school in Cairo and then in Sudan, where his father worked as a civil servant. He studied at the Gordon Memorial College in Khartoum and attended two years of his secondary school there before returning to Egypt where he continued his secondary education. Afterwards he entered the high school of teachers and graduated in 1930. He then worked as a teacher until 1944.

He was married to Dr Munira Helmy, a professor of psychology at Ain Shams University.

== Academic life ==
Zaki Naguib Mahmoud finished his education at Ain Shams University, and then travelled to the United Kingdom to do his PhD at King's College London in Philosophy. He defended his dissertation titled "self-determination" successfully and obtained his PhD in 1947, later on the dissertation was translated by his student Dr. Abdul-Fattah Emam.

When he came back, he was appointed as a lecturer, then, assistant professor and finally professor of philosophy at the Faculty of Arts, Cairo University. Among the distinguished positions Zaki Naguib Mahmoud held are: professor of philosophy in the University of Kuwait (1968), member of the Supreme Council of Culture, and of the National Council of Education and Scientific Research. In addition, he worked in 1953 as a visiting professor of philosophy in The University of South Carolina in Columbia, USA for one semester, and in Washington State University in Pullman, Washington in the second, and then he worked as a cultural attaché in the Embassy of Egypt in Washington, D.C. (1954–1955).

Zaki Naguib Mahmoud was given the State Incentive Award in 1960, Order of Merit Award in 1970, Arab Educational, Scientific and Cultural Organization Award in 1984, The American University in Cairo Honorary Doctorate in 1985, and the necklace of Sultan Al-Owais of the U.A.E. in 1991, an award which is exclusive to the most distinguished figures in the Arab world.

== His thought ==
Zaki Naguib Mahmoud's thought can be divided into two or three phases, according to the measure we use to approach and evaluate it. In the general meaning of the term "thought" it is evident according to his own writings as well as other scholars that he passed through three phases of thinking.

== Evolution of his thought ==
Zaki Naguib started his intellectual life, in its first phase, with a religious if not a Sufi position in which he defended religious miracles, human freedom as well as metaphysical contemplation of human life. It is believed that this phase extended until his studies for PhD and peaked in his dissertation "self-determination". In this work he attacked Hume's empiricism as well as behaviorism in their rejection of the concept of the psych. Following this attack he purported to support the view of objective free will of human psych or mind, albeit with the acknowledgement of the deterministic nature of its environment as well as its own constitution determined through history.

His second phase of thought began in the late 1940s and early 1950s. Dr. Mahmoud was exposed during his studies in England to analytic philosophy and was greatly influenced by the thought of Bertrand Russell and attended a lecture by Alfred Ayer on "Logical Positivism". This constituted a form of preparation for his second phase, in which he strictly adopted the principles of the new philosophical school of Logical positivism. Logical positivism rejected philosophy in its metaphysical sense and rendered it to the status of the analysis of scientific knowledge and analysis of meanings of the regular language. This period extended to somewhere between 1960 after writing The Artist East and 1968, when he left to teach in Kuwait. Landmarks of this period are his books: On Positivist Logic (1951), The Philosophy of Science (1952), The Myth of Metaphysics (1953) and The Theory of Knowledge (1956).

In particular, in The Myth of Metaphysics, he empathized on the well-known idea of the Logical Positivists that non-scientific phrases that cannot be verified scientifically are void of objective meaning. This was understood by the wider community as an indirect rejection of religion in general and Islam in particular. The book has invoked a storm of attack and criticism to its topic and to the author. In a late response, 1984, Zaki Naguib has reprinted the book with a slightly more moderate title A Stance from Metaphysics.

The third and last period has clarified itself during the period he stayed in Kuwait University between 1968 and 1973. This period can be viewed as a synthesis of the two previous stages. For it is marked by his deep interest in the intellectual Islamic heritage as well as the Islamic view as possessing specific characteristics. This new synthesis has revealed itself in domination of the problematic known as "Authenticity and Modernity" on his thought. This period is best marked, among many other writings by his books: The Rational and the Irrational in our Intellectual Heritage (1975), Our Culture in Front of Contemporary Time, (1976), and An Islamic Vision (1987).

However, if we adopt a strict philosophical measure in assessing his works we would be speaking about two phases of philosophical thought. Moreover, these two phases should be understood within one philosophical theme that comprises the essence of his philosophy.

== Philosophy ==
Mahmoud's philosophy can be found in one recurrent theme that constitutes the driving motive behind his successive views and phases. According to his own interpretation in his intellectual autobiography, A Story of a Mind, we may present such a central theme in one phrase: "Scientific thinking as a basic social value". His central problem was, as much as every thinker in the Arabic modernist era, how to transform a backward society like our present Arabic and Islamic societies into an advanced one. The answer was, in his view, to get rid of superstitious and irrational ways of thinking, and replace them by scientific thinking.

Hence, his enthusiasm for Logical Positivism was essentially a pragmatic move, his vision was that he can make use of this philosophical/scientific construct to uplift and boost his central idea. However, we should say that his writings during the first phase do not show any provisions, deviations or partial criticism of this philosophy. Hence, we can conclude correctly that such a pragmatic explanation of his position at that period applies only on the subconscious level, in which contradictions of this view with his traditional convictions has been running on the subconscious level.

In any case, "Scientific thinking", as an absent value in our societies, has taken for him the form of a philosophical project. The basic aim of such a project is to push toward implementing such thinking in the society, and the means with which this goal will be achieved is the position of logical positivism, or "scientific empiricism", the term he prefers. Success in this project requires positive reception form the society, which happened partially on the intellectual as well as governmental levels, but not on the general and lay person one.

Hence, in the second phase, his belief in "scientific thinking" as a necessary societal value, remained the same but in the form of an underlying structure covered by the study&n and analysis of the rational trends of Islamic heritage. Therefore, once again, the study of Islamic heritage was a pragmatic move in order to overcome resistance against his call for "scientific thinking".

This becomes perfectly clear if one analyses any of his articles and books in his second stage. The underlying message remains the same albeit with different terms. In addition, this method- a superstructure of Islamic analysis founded on a scientific if not positivist concepts – represented his response to the difficult question of Authenticity and Modernity. In brief, his view can be epitomized as follows: we should not abandon our intellectual heritage in order to achieve modernity, for this would be some form of a cultural suicide, instead we stress and use the rational and intellectual part of it in conjunction with contemporary advancements of scientific and objective philosophical thought.

If we want to classify his philosophy from the point of view of the degree of abstractness and its relation to real life, then we would say that Dr. Zaki Naguib lines up with those philosophers who expressed their philosophy through literature and art rather than through building metaphysical constructs. For, he did not build a metaphysical construct, despite his use of "Logical positivism" in its abstract form. In this sense he is closer to Sartre, Nietzsche and Kierkegaard, in modern ages, and to Abu Hayan Altawhidi in ancient Arabic philosophy than to Russell, Kant and Ibn Rusd. Hence he was rightly referred to as "the philosopher of literature writers and the writer of the philosophers".

== Works ==
Mahmoud authored many books and translations in addition to his numerous articles in magazines and newspapers, including the Egyptian Al Ahram.

=== A - In Philosophy ===
- On Positivist Logic, two parts
- On Formal Logic, 1951
- On Philosophy of Science, 1952
- David Hume, 1951
- The Myth of Metaphysics, 1953
- Theory of Knowledge, 1956
- Bertrand Russell, 1956
- The Live of Thought in the New World, 1956
- Toward a Scientific Philosophy, 1959
- The Artist East, 1960
- Jābir ibn Hayyān, 1961

=== B - In Arabic Modernity ===
- Renewal of Arabic Thought, 1973
- The Rational and the Irrational in Our Intellectual Heritage, 1975
- Our Culture in Front of Contemporary Time, 1976
- In Our Mental Live, 1979
- With Poets, 1980
- This Time and Its Culture, 1980
- From a Philosophical Point of View, 1980
- Preoccupations of Intellectuals, 1981
- Thoughts and Positions, 1983
- A New Society Or a Disaster, 1983
- A Story of a Mind, 1984
- In a Conjunction, 1985
- About Freedom I am Talking, 1986
- An Islamic Vision, 1987
- On Modernization of Arabic Culture, 1988
- An Arabic Between Two Cultures, 1990
- The Outcome of the Years, 1991

=== C - Literature writings ===
- The Lands of The Dreams, 1939
- Shakespeare, 1943
- The Paradise of the Fool, 1947
- Shreds of Glass, 1947
- A Sunrise from the West, 1950
- With the Revolution on the Doors, 1955
- Days in America, 1955
- A Story of a Psych, 1965

=== D - Writings in English ===
- Translations of Al-Akkad Poetry, 1945
- PhD Dissertation titled "Self Determination", 1947
- The Land and People of Egypt, 1956

=== E - Translations ===
==== a - In Philosophy ====
- Four Dialogues of Plato, 1936
- The Rich and the Poor, H. G. Wells, 1937
- History of Western Philosophy, Bertrand Russell, 1954
- Logic, a Theory of Research, John Dewy, 1959,

==== b - In Collaboration with Ahmad Amin ====
- The Story of Greek Philosophy, 1935
- The Story of Modern Philosophy, 1936
- The Story of Literature, in three parts
- On Ancient and medieval Literature, 1943
- On Modern Literature, 1945
- On Eastern and Western Literature in the 19th century, 1948

==== c - In Cultural History and Literature Critique ====
- The Arts of Literature, H. T Charlton, 1944
- I Preferred Freedom, Vector Crafetchenco, 1944
- The Story of Civilization, Will Durant, Thee books of the 1st volume,
- The Appearance of Civilization, 1950
- India and its Neighbors, 1951
- Japan, 1951
- The Heritage of Middle Ages, 1967

== Death ==
Mahmoud died on September 8, 1993, aged 88.

== See also ==
- List of Egyptian authors
- List of African writers
