= Hallett =

Hallet may refer to:

== Places ==
- Cape Hallett, Northern Victoria Land, the location of a scientific base in Antarctica
- Hallett, South Australia, Australia
- Halletts Bay, on the eastern shore of Lake Taupō in New Zealand

=== United States ===
- Hallett, Missouri
- Hallett, Oklahoma
- Hallett Nature Sanctuary, New York City, US
- Hallett Peak, a mountain in Colorado's Rocky Mountain National Park, USA

== Other uses ==
- Hallett (surname)

== See also ==
- Hallett Cove (disambiguation)
- Hallet (disambiguation)
- Hallatt (disambiguation)
- Hallettsville
