= Hollett =

Hollett is a surname. Notable people with the surname include:

- Don Hollett (1935–2020), Canadian politician
- Flash Hollett (1911–1999), Canadian ice hockey player
- Ivan Hollett (1940–2022), English footballer
- Jennifer Hollett (born 1975), Canadian media executive
- Malcolm Mercer Hollett (1891–1985), Canadian magistrate and politician
- Matthew Hollett, Canadian writer
- Michael Hollett (born 1985), Canadian publisher
- Pamela Hollett, South African cricketer
- Roger Hollett (born 1978), Canadian mixed martial artist

== See also ==
- Hallett (disambiguation)
