= Hallet =

Hallet may refer to:

== People ==
- André Hallet (1890–1959), Belgian painter
- Étienne Sulpice Hallet (1755–1825), French-born American architect
- Gérard Hallet (born 1946), French footballer
- Gilles Hallet (1620–1694), Flemish Baroque painter
- Jean-Pierre Hallet (1927–2004), Belgian ethnologist, naturalist, and humanitarian
- Jim Hallet (born 1960), American golfer
- John Hallet, British actor
- Judith Dwan Hallet (born 1941), American filmmaker

== Places ==
- Hallet Township, Hodgeman County, Kansas, U.S.
- Hallet Valley, valley in Victoria Land, Antarctica

== See also ==
- Hallett (disambiguation)
