= Northcutt-Carter Route =

Rock climbing route on Hallett Peak, Colorado

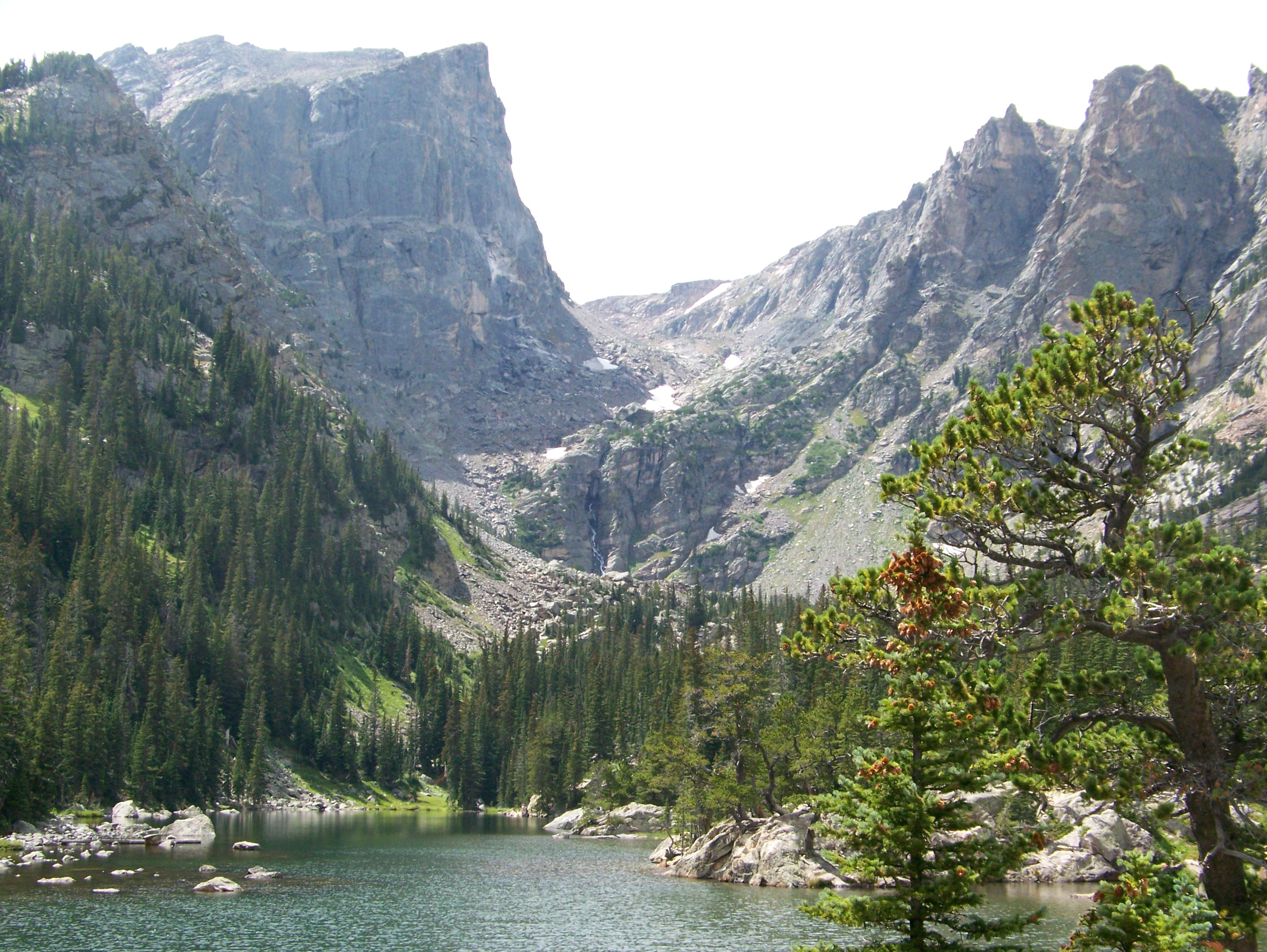
- Looking west over Dream Lake. Hallett Peak is on the left with the dramatic cliff band and prominent point.
- Location: Rocky Mountain National Park, Colorado, USA
- Coordinates: 40.30310°N 105.686°W
- Climbing area: Hallett Peak
- Route type: Trad/Alpine
- Vertical gain: 900 feet
- Pitches: 8
- Technical grade: 5.7
- NCCS grade: III
- First ascent: R. Northcutt & Carter

The Northcutt-Carter Route is a popular technical climbing route on Hallett Peak in Colorado's Rocky Mountain National Park. The Northcutt-Carter Route is recognized in the historic climbing text Fifty Classic Climbs of North America.

A massive rockfall in 1999 removed the first two pitches of the route.
