= Andrews Glacier =

Glacier in Colorado, United States

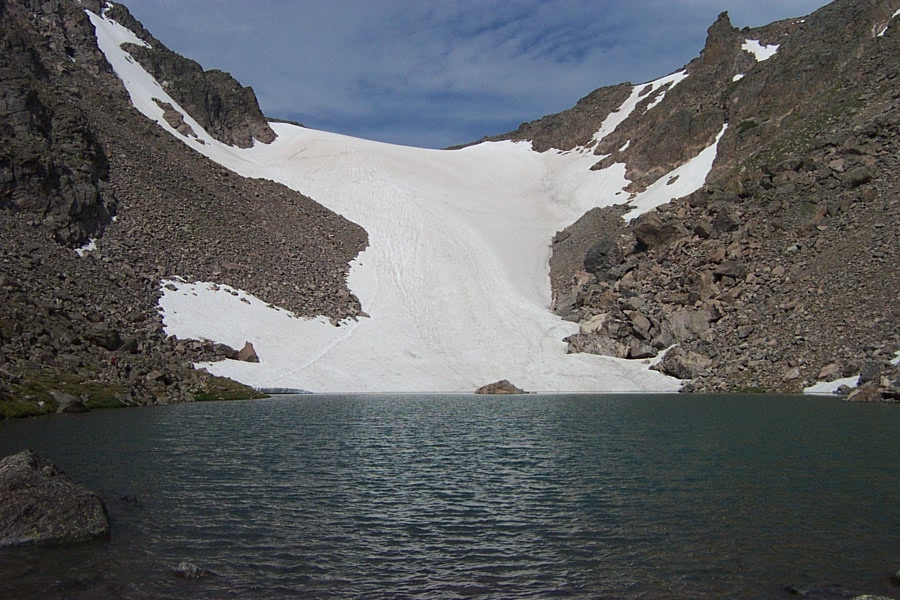
- Andrews Glacier viewed from the outlet of Andrews Tarn

- Location within Colorado
- Type: Mountain glacier
- Location: Larimer County, Colorado, U.S.
- Coordinates: 40°17′15″N 105°41′02″W
- Terminus: Talus
- Status: Retreating

Andrews Glacier is an alpine glacier in a cirque below Otis Peak (12,486 ft (3,806 m)) in Rocky Mountain National Park in the U.S. state of Colorado. The glacier extends from Andrews Pass at nearly 12,000 to 11,700 feet (3,700 to 3,600 m) with some perennial snow extending to Andrews Tarn, a small proglacial lake. When images of the glacier taken in the early 1900s are compared with those of the early 2000s, Andrews Glacier is showing a negative glacier mass balance which indicates the glacier is retreating.

== See also ==
- List of glaciers in the United States
