= Bear Lake (Colorado) =

Scenic trailhead and destination in Rocky Mountain National Park

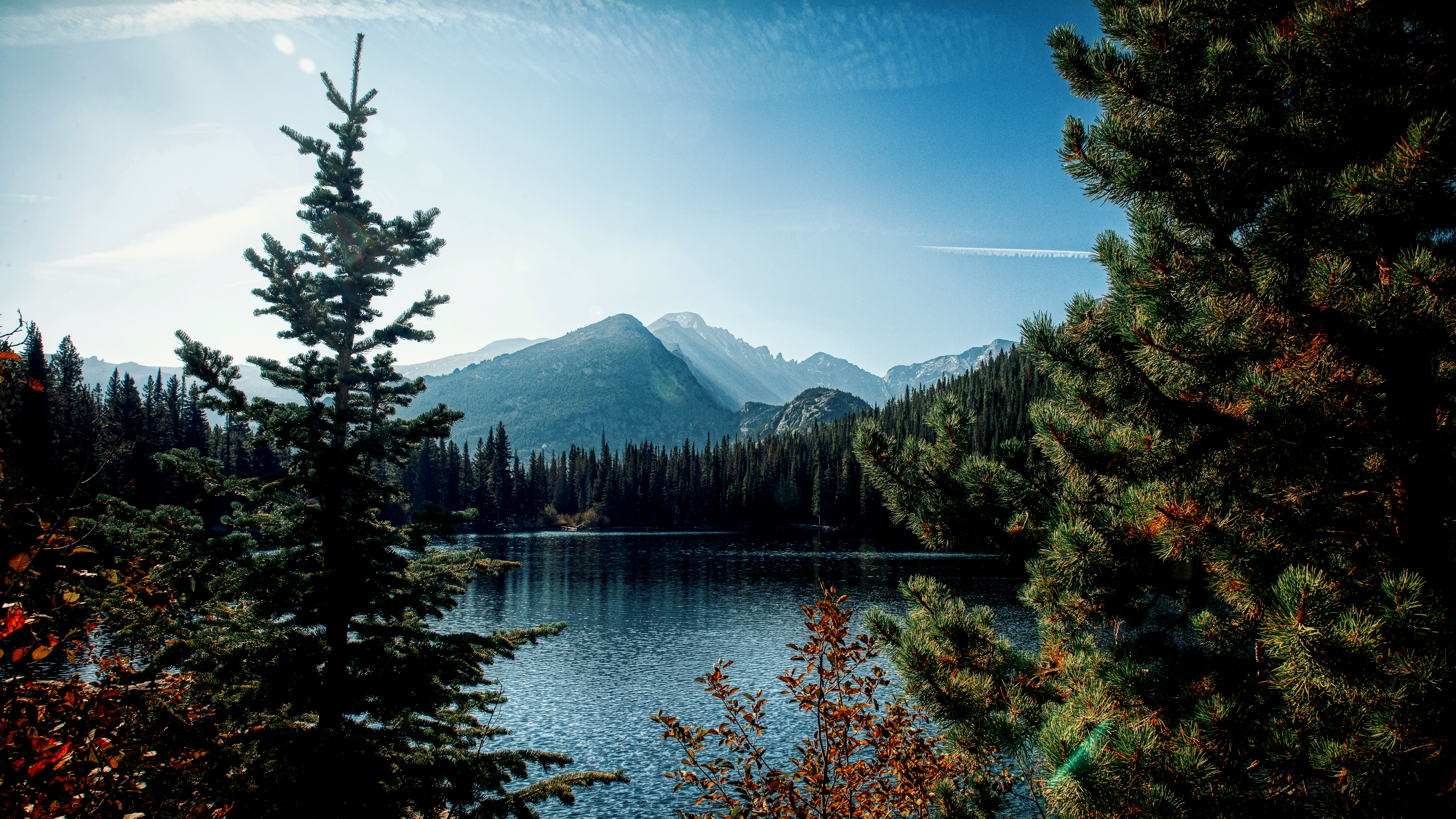
Bear Lake, 2020

Bear Lake is a scenic trailhead and destination in Rocky Mountain National Park. Sitting at an elevation of 9,450 feet (2,880 m), the alpine lake rests beneath the sheer flanks of Hallett Peak and the Continental Divide at 40.31324°N 105.648222°W. Several trails, from easy strolls to strenuous hikes, start from the lake. The Bear Lake Road is open year-round, though it may temporarily close due to adverse weather conditions. An ample parking lot is provided close to the lake. The Bear Lake Road is approximately 10 miles (16 km) long and starts close to the Beaver Meadows Entrance station of the Rocky Mountain National Park.

The lake was formed during the ice age by a big chunk of ice. Several moraines can be found downhill of Bear Lake.

== Climate ==
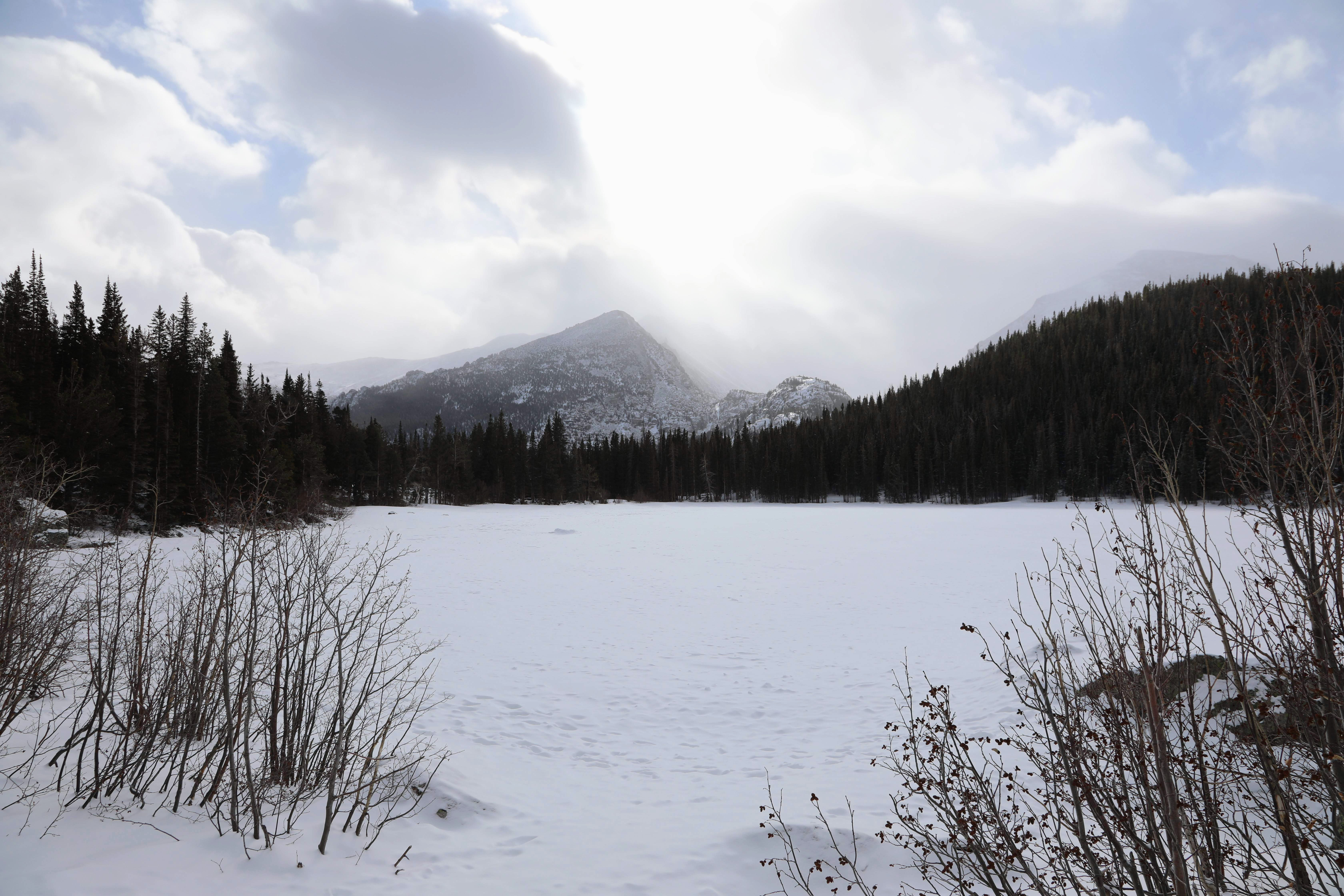
Bear Lake in snow, January 2020

At an elevation of 9500 ft (2896 m), Bear Lake has a humid continental climate (Köppen Dfb), closely bordering on a subalpine climate (Köppen Dfc).

Climate data for Bear Lake, Colorado, 1991–2020 normals, 1989–2020 extremes: 9500ft (2896m)
Month	Jan	Feb	Mar	Apr	May	Jun	Jul	Aug	Sep	Oct	Nov	Dec	Year
Record high °F (°C)	54 (12)	52 (11)	61 (16)	65 (18)	76 (24)	84 (29)	87 (31)	83 (28)	80 (27)	70 (21)	63 (17)	53 (12)	87 (31)
Mean maximum °F (°C)	44.3 (6.8)	45.5 (7.5)	53.0 (11.7)	59.5 (15.3)	67.1 (19.5)	75.9 (24.4)	79.8 (26.6)	77.0 (25.0)	72.2 (22.3)	62.6 (17.0)	50.5 (10.3)	43.0 (6.1)	80.4 (26.9)
Mean daily maximum °F (°C)	28.8 (−1.8)	30.4 (−0.9)	38.5 (3.6)	44.3 (6.8)	53.1 (11.7)	64.4 (18.0)	70.8 (21.6)	68.7 (20.4)	60.6 (15.9)	47.9 (8.8)	35.7 (2.1)	28.0 (−2.2)	47.6 (8.7)
Daily mean °F (°C)	21.9 (−5.6)	22.5 (−5.3)	29.3 (−1.5)	34.5 (1.4)	42.6 (5.9)	52.9 (11.6)	59.1 (15.1)	57.5 (14.2)	50.4 (10.2)	39.5 (4.2)	29.0 (−1.7)	21.4 (−5.9)	38.4 (3.6)
Mean daily minimum °F (°C)	15.0 (−9.4)	14.6 (−9.7)	20.1 (−6.6)	24.7 (−4.1)	32.0 (0.0)	41.5 (5.3)	47.5 (8.6)	46.3 (7.9)	40.2 (4.6)	31.2 (−0.4)	22.3 (−5.4)	14.8 (−9.6)	29.2 (−1.6)
Mean minimum °F (°C)	−4.9 (−20.5)	−5.4 (−20.8)	1.8 (−16.8)	8.7 (−12.9)	19.0 (−7.2)	31.7 (−0.2)	40.1 (4.5)	38.3 (3.5)	26.8 (−2.9)	13.6 (−10.2)	1.3 (−17.1)	−5.6 (−20.9)	−11.7 (−24.3)
Record low °F (°C)	−21 (−29)	−33 (−36)	−13 (−25)	−9 (−23)	4 (−16)	22 (−6)	32 (0)	31 (−1)	14 (−10)	−9 (−23)	−16 (−27)	−24 (−31)	−33 (−36)
Average precipitation inches (mm)	3.09 (78)	3.22 (82)	3.42 (87)	4.71 (120)	3.52 (89)	1.68 (43)	2.07 (53)	1.95 (50)	2.28 (58)	2.50 (64)	2.91 (74)	2.85 (72)	34.2 (870)
Average extreme snow depth inches (cm)	43.1 (109)	53.3 (135)	60.5 (154)	63.5 (161)	50.9 (129)	12.1 (31)	0.0 (0.0)	0.0 (0.0)	0.8 (2.0)	10.3 (26)	17.4 (44)	32.1 (82)	64.8 (165)
Average precipitation days (≥ 0.01 in)	15.0	15.1	15.3	17.0	13.9	7.0	8.5	9.1	8.6	9.8	13.0	13.7	146
Source 1: XMACIS2 (normals, records & 2005–2020 snow depth)
Source 2: NOAA (precip/precip days)

== See also ==
- Alpine Visitor Center
