= Charles Willcox =

Businessman and politician in South Australia (1843–1921)

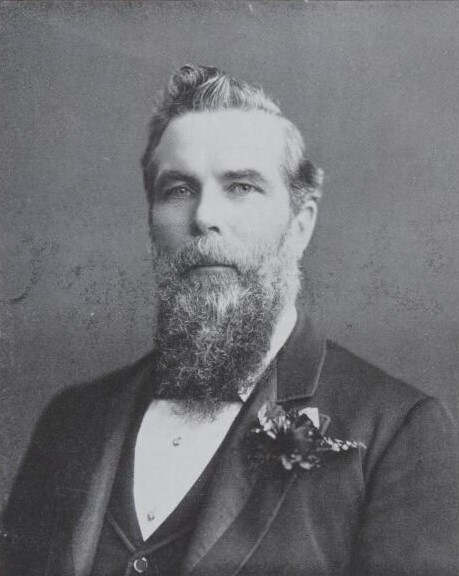
- Born: 15 September 1843; Burrowbridge, Somerset, UK
- Died: 7 September 1921 (aged 77); Adelaide, South Australia
- Occupation: businessman
- Known for: Mayor of the City of Adelaide, member of the South Australian Parliament

Charles Willcox (15 September 1843 – 7 September 1921) was an Australian businessman and politician. He was Mayor of Adelaide from 1892 to 1894, was briefly a member of the South Australian House of Assembly for Gumeracha in 1896, and was a member of the South Australian Legislative Council for North-Eastern District from 1897 to 1902.

== Early years ==
He was born at Burrowbridge on the River Parrett in Somerset, where he was educated, before sailing to South Australia in 1863 in the Adamant at the age of 18. For a time he resided in the south-east of South Australia and worked on the land, then for the wholesale merchants Goode Brothers in Adelaide.

== Businessman ==
In 1873 he joined with one William Gilbert to form Gilbert, Willcox and Co., hay and corn merchants in Tynte Street, North Adelaide. Ten years later he bought out Gilbert and continued business as Charles Willcox and Co. then bought into and took over several other businesses.

In 1886, he and W. Everard bought the Payneham and Paradise Tram Company then in 1896 the Goodwood and Clarence Park tramways. These were taken over by the Government to form the Municipal Tramways Trust for the purpose of electrification.

He was a director of several steamship companies which were taken over around 1915 by Adelaide Steamship Company, of which he was to remain a director until he died.

Around 1886 he helped Job Hallett found the brickmaking firm that in 1904 became J. Hallett and Son.

In 1901 he took over the produce firm of W. Thyer and Co. and continued trading as Thyer, Willcox and Co.

He also had interests in farming at Mallala and Two Wells, fruit-growing at Renmark and Berri, the Terowie Mill, the Adelaide (Queen Victoria) Jubilee Exhibition of 1887, the YMCA, the North Adelaide Institute, and John Hill & Co.

== Politician ==
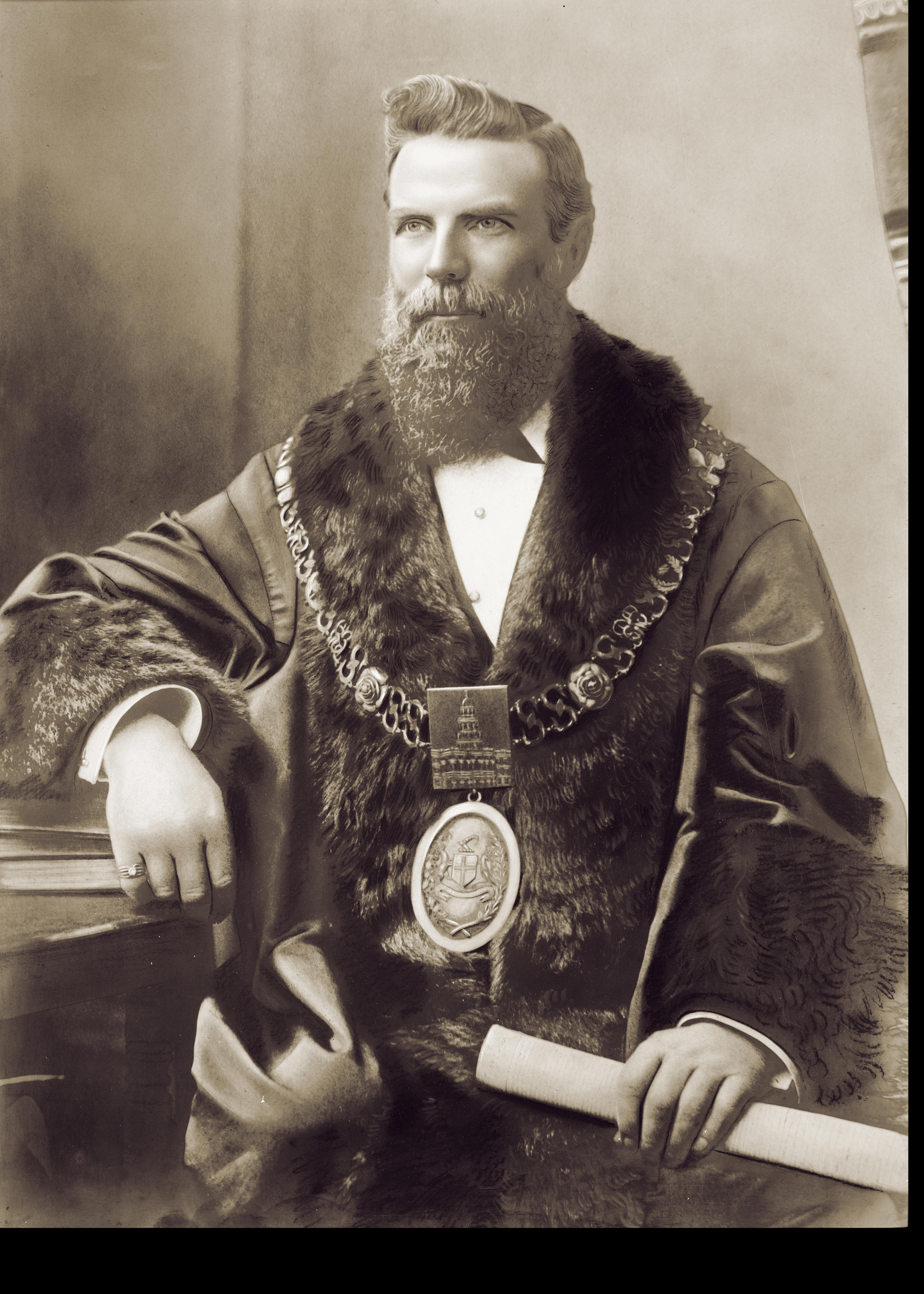
Photographic portrait of Charles Willcox in his mayoral robes, ca.1892

He was elected to the Adelaide City Council for the Robe ward in 1882, became alderman, and was elected mayor by the narrowest of majorities against alderman Sketheway in 1892, a position he held for two years.

He was elected to the South Australian House of Assembly in the seat of Gumeracha, but resigned after objections that he was a government contractor. In 1896 he was elected to North-Eastern District for the Legislative Council.

== Family and community ==
He helped found the Adelaide Y.M.C.A., of which he was for many years a committee member, also of the Royal Institute for the Blind and Home for Incurables. He was also a prominent member of the Tynte Street Baptist Church.

He married twice and was survived by a widow, six sons and five daughters.

- His eldest son, Frank May Willcox (d. 6 September 1946) was a prominent medical practitioner who trained and practised in both Edinburgh and Adelaide.
- Mr. S. Willcox lived at Two Wells
- Alan May Willcox of Two Wells and Salisbury.
- H.G. Willcox of Robe Terrace, Medindie was at one time a director of the Littlehampton Brick Co. Ltd.
- Percy Howard Willcox lived at Clare and Medindie.
- Charles Angas Willcox lived at Fitzroy

The surviving daughters were:

- Mrs. G. Hillman of Prospect
- Mrs. R.W. Thomas of Brisbane
- Mrs. Malcolm P. Reid of Toorak
- Miss Patrica Kathleen Murie Willcox of Prospect and London
- Miss Irene Phyllis Willcox of Fitzroy and London

== Sources ==
"Death of Mr. Charles Willcox". The Advertiser. 8 September 1921. p. 9 – via Trove.
