= Hallatt =

Hallatt is a surname. Notable people with the surname include:

- Alex Hallatt (born 1969), British cartoonist
- David Hallatt (born 1937), English Anglican priest
- May Hallatt (1876–1969), British actress

== See also ==
- Hallett (disambiguation)
