= Otis Peak =

Mountain in the state of Colorado

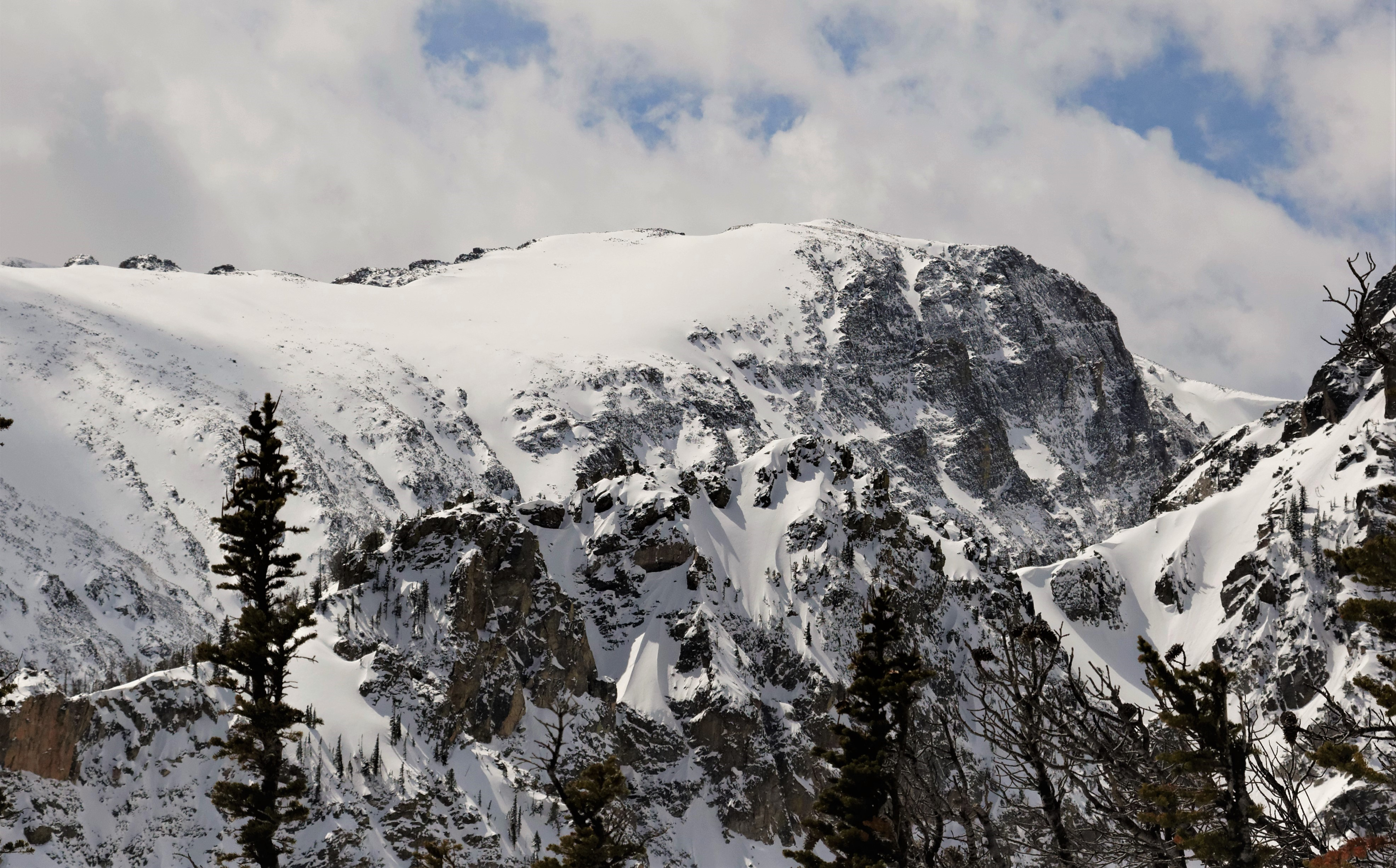
- North aspect

Highest point
- Elevation: 12,486 ft (3,806 m)
- Prominence: 450 ft (137 m)
- Parent peak: Hallett Peak (12,720 ft)
- Isolation: 0.79 mi (1.27 km)
- Coordinates: 40°17′31″N 105°40′51″W

Geography
- Location within Colorado Location within the United States
- Country: United States
- State: Colorado
- County: Grand County / Larimer County
- Protected area: Rocky Mountain National Park
- Parent range: Rocky Mountains; Front Range
- Topo map: USGS McHenrys Peak

Geology
- Rock age: Paleoproterozoic
- Rock type(s): Biotite schist and gneiss

Climbing
- Easiest route: class 2

Otis Peak is a 12,486-foot-elevation (3,806-meter) mountain summit on the boundary shared by Grand County and Larimer County, in Colorado, United States.

== Description ==
Otis Peak is set along the Continental Divide in the Front Range of the Rocky Mountains. The mountain is situated within Rocky Mountain National Park and 11 miles (18 km) southwest of Estes Park. Precipitation runoff from the mountain drains chiefly into tributaries of Glacier Creek which in turn is a tributary of the Big Thompson River, and the lower west slope drains to Grand Lake via North Inlet. A portion of that water that arrives at Grand Lake is then diverted to the east side of the Continental Divide via the Alva B. Adams Tunnel which is bored under Otis Peak. Topographic relief is significant as the summit rises 2,300 feet (700 meters) above Loch Vale in one mile.

== Etymology ==
The mountain's toponym was reported in publications as early as 1915, and was officially adopted in 1932 by the United States Board on Geographic Names. The peak is named for Dr. Edward Osgood Otis (1848–1933), a recognized authority on tuberculosis, who spent time mountain climbing in this area in the 1880s.

== Climate ==
According to the Köppen climate classification system, Otis Peak is located in an alpine subarctic climate zone with cold, snowy winters, and cool to warm summers. Due to its altitude, it receives precipitation all year, as snow in winter, and as thunderstorms in summer, with a dry period in late spring. This climate supports the Andrews Glacier below the south slope of Otis Peak.

== Gallery ==
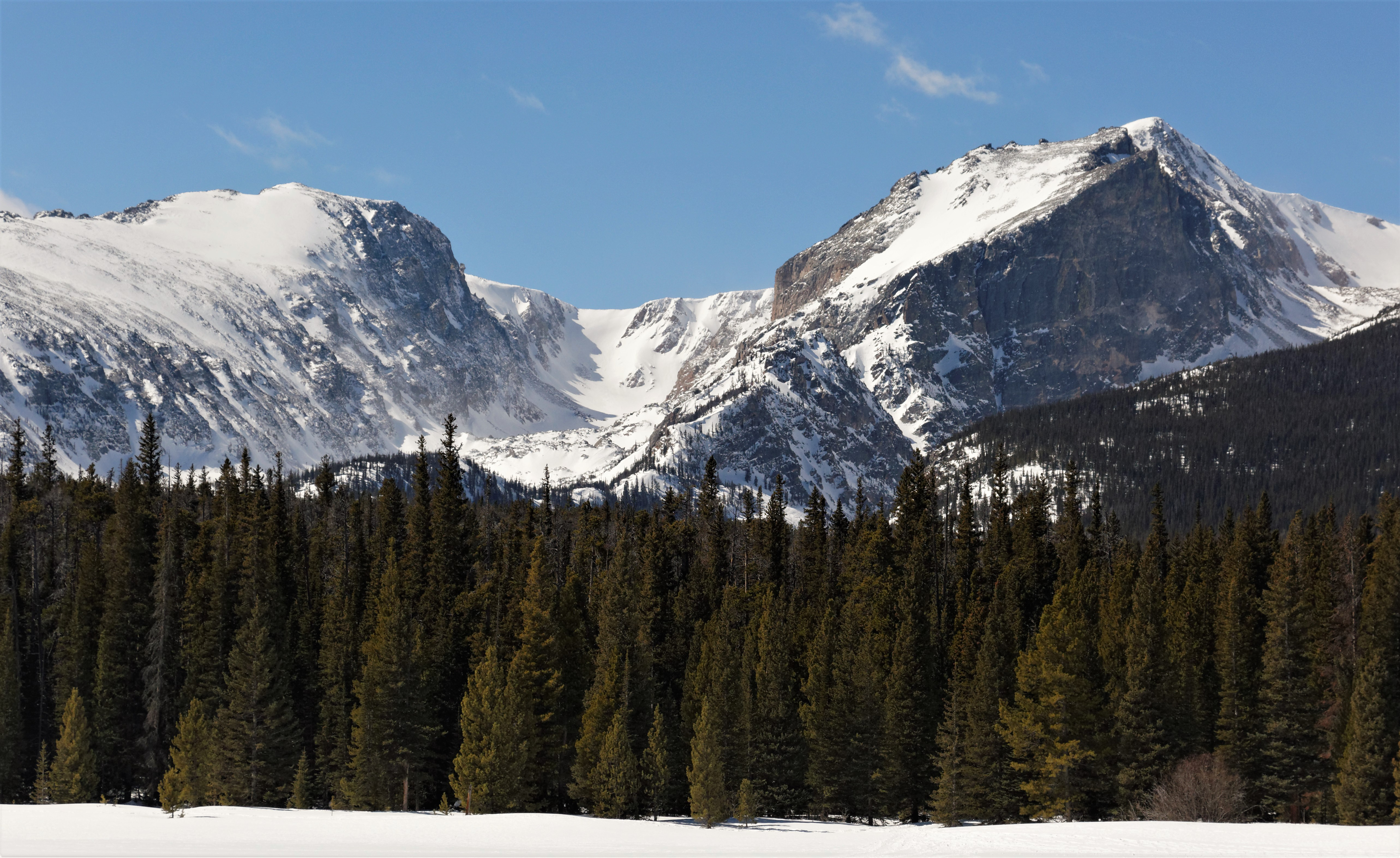
Otis Peak (left) and Hallett Peak from northeast

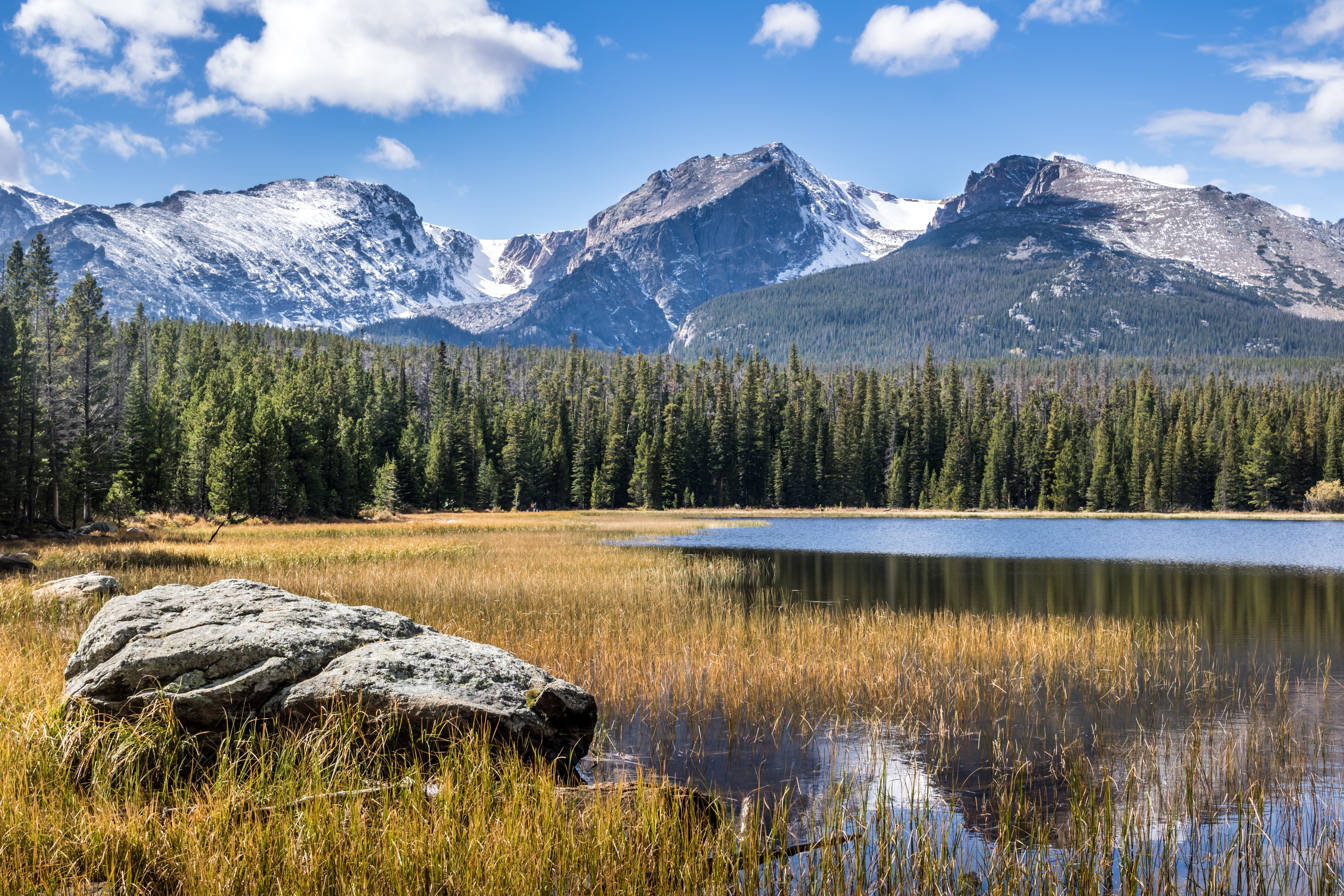
Otis Peak (left), Hallett Peak (center), Flattop Mountain (right)

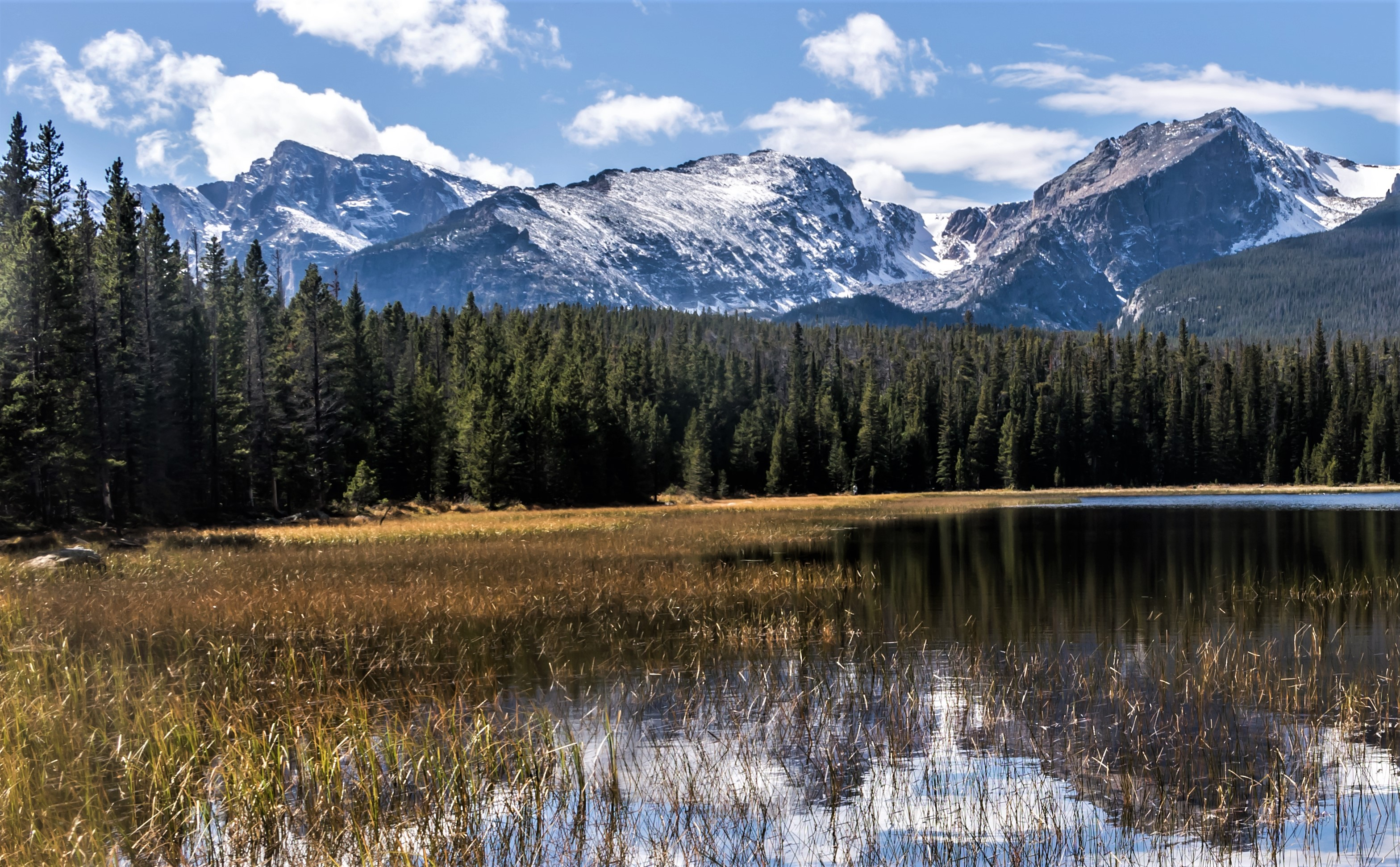
Taylor Peak, Otis Peak, and Hallett Peak

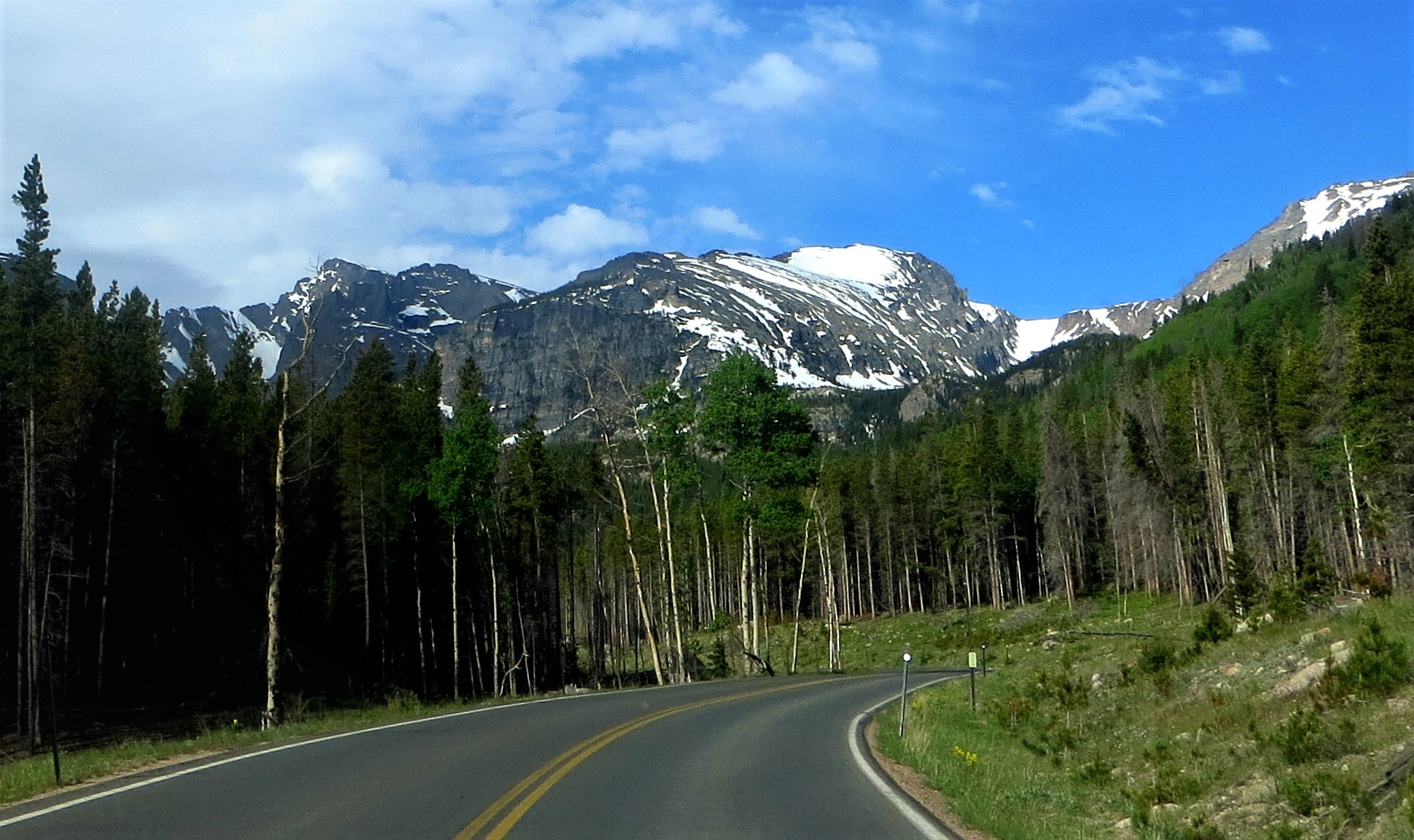
Otis Peak

== See also ==
- List of peaks in Rocky Mountain National Park
- Mountains of Larimer County, Colorado

== Notes ==
Elevation for Otis Peak ranges from 12,481 feet measured by LiDAR, 12,486 feet on USGS topographical map, and 12,504 feet with a GPS unit.
