= Dream Lake =

Lake in the Rocky Mountains, United States

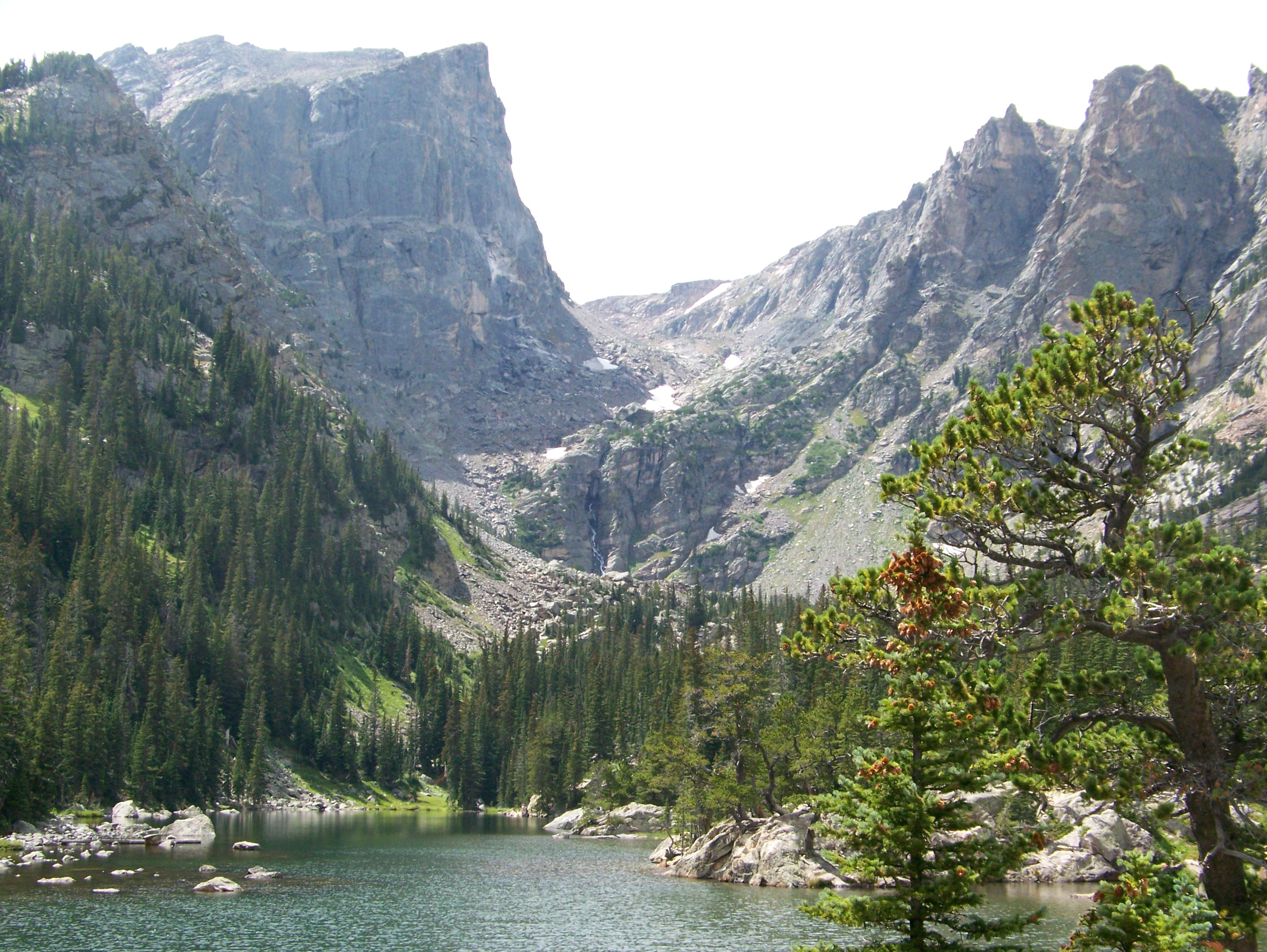
- Looking West over Dream Lake

- Location within Colorado Location within the United States
- Location: Rocky Mountain National Park, Larimer County, Colorado, US
- Coordinates: 40°18′34″N 105°39′32″W
- Basin countries: United States
- Surface elevation: 3,019 m (9,905 ft)

Dream Lake is a high alpine lake located in Rocky Mountain National Park in northern Colorado, located east of the continental divide.

The lake is at the base of Hallett Peak and access is via the Bear Lake trail head. It is at the heart of the park, and at Region 4 of the park's geographical zones.

It is known for its views caused by surrounding steep cliffs, good location for winter snowshoeing, and is a destination for casual hiking. It is one of the most-photographed lakes. Emerald Lake is a short hike beyond Dream Lake.
