= Samuel Islands =

Archipelago off the coast of South Georgia

The Samuel Islands (54°11′S 37°37′W) are a group of small islands and rocks lying close to the south coast of South Georgia, 1.6 km (1 mile) west-southwest of Nilse Hullet and 3.2 km (2 miles) east-southeast of Klutschak Point. Surveyed by the SGS in the period 1951–57. Named by the United Kingdom Antarctic Place-Names Committee (UK-APC) after the catcher Don Samuel, built in 1925 and later owned by the Compania Argentina de Pesca, Grytviken, which sank in the vicinity of these islands in 1951.

== See also ==
- List of Antarctic and sub-Antarctic islands
