= A. Eugene Haylett =

American football and basketball coach

Biographical details
- Born: September 17, 1903; Nebraska, U.S.
- Died: December 8, 1965 (aged 62); Rochester, Minnesota, U.S.

Coaching career (HC unless noted)

Football
- 1933–1941: Doane

Basketball
- 1933–1942: Doane

Head coaching record
- Overall: 34–30–8 (football); 84–62 (basketball)

Accomplishments and honors

Championships
- Football; 2 NCAC (1938, 1940) Basketball; 3 NCAC regular season (1939, 1941–1942)

Albert Eugene Haylett (September 17, 1903 – December 8, 1965) was an American college football and college basketball coach. He was the 22nd head football coach at Doane College in Crete, Nebraska, serving for nine seasons, from 1933 to 1941, and compiling a record of 34–30–8. Haylett was also the head basketball coach at Doane from 1933 to 1942, tallying a mark of 84–62.

== Head coaching record ==
=== Football ===
| Year | Team | Overall | Conference | Standing | Bowl/playoffs |
|---|---|---|---|---|---|
Doane Tigers (Nebraska College Athletic Conference) (1933–1941)
| 1933 | Doane | 1–5–2 | 0–3–1 | 5th | |
| 1934 | Doane | 3–5 | 1–3 | 4th | |
| 1935 | Doane | 6–3 | 2–2 | 3rd | |
| 1936 | Doane | 0–5–2 | 0–4 | 5th | |
| 1937 | Doane | 6–1–1 | 2–1 | 2nd | |
| 1938 | Doane | 5–3 | 3–1 | T–1st | |
| 1939 | Doane | 4–4 | 2–2 | 3rd | |
| 1940 | Doane | 5–2–1 | 3–0–1 | T–1st | |
| 1941 | Doane | 4–2–2 | 2–1–1 | 2nd | |
| Doane: | | 34–30–8 | 15–17–3 | | |
| Total: | | 34–30–8 | | | |
