= Nilse Hullet =

Nilse Hullet (54°10′S 37°35′W) is a cove indenting the south coast of South Georgia, 1.5 nautical miles (2.8 km) southwest of Cheapman Bay and 1 nautical mile (1.9 km) east-northeast of Samuel Islands. Surveyed by the SGS in the period 1951–57. The name is well established in local use.
