= J. Hallett and Son =

Former brickmakers in Adelaide, South Australia

J. Hallett and Son, founded in 1904, was for most of the 20th century South Australia's most important brickmaking firm. Founded by Job H. Hallett in 1889, his son Thomas Hallett became a partner in 1904. There were several sites across Adelaide's western suburbs, with Halletts retaining their identity until the 1960s, when the company was absorbed by the Nubrik Hallett group (now Austral Bricks).

== History of the company ==
Its founder, Job H. Hallett (Note: The name is pronounced "jobe"; the "H.", though frequently seen, is not the abbreviation of some middle name, much like the "S." in Harry S. Truman) (1855–27 October 1940) was born in Somerset, the son of Thomas and Caroline Hallett (née Eves) of Kingsbury Episcopi. He sailed to Adelaide in 1877. He started work on a farm in Riverton but, having some experience in brick-making (his father's trade), was soon in Hindmarsh working for Tom Sherring and T. T. Brown. Owing to the plentiful supply of clay along the banks of the Torrens, and the need for dwellings and other buildings, by 1881 there were nine large brickworks in the area, as well as a number of smaller ones.

After inheriting £500, assisted by Charles Willcox, 1889 Job started his own brickworks in Chief Street, Brompton, close to the claypits along the Torrens River. His son Tom joined the company after leaving school in 1898,

The firm's first big order came in 1903, to supply the bricks to build the School of Mines and Industries (now the University of South Australia) on North Terrace in the city of Adelaide. In 1904 Hallett took his eldest son, Thomas into partnership, and used his prosperity to expand the business, acquiring seven other brickworks in the suburbs of Brompton and Hindmarsh over the next few years. In 1910 the family merged with Metropolitan Bricks to form J. Hallett & Son Ltd, on South Road at Torrensville, which then acquired the Federal Brick Company's brickworks on South Road. New Machinery was installed and there was plenty of clay in the old Federal clay pits. Using the wet-plastic wire cut method, they made bricks which were fired in a Hoffman kiln with enough capacity for 300,000 bricks, producing around 180,000 each week.

The company acquired the Federal Brickworks in Thebarton (now Torrensville) and installed brickmaking machinery. The first two Hoffman kilns were built at new highly-mechanised yards at Welland (now Allenby Gardens) and Torrensville (1913), and smaller plants were bought or built at Gawler, Blackwood, Magill, and Port Lincoln on the Eyre Peninsula.

By the time of Job's death in October 1940, the company's main plants were located in Torrensville, Welland and Port Lincoln. It was the largest brickmaking business in South Australia, employing 170 men. By the end of World War II in 1945, the company's main plants were at Allenby Gardens and Torrensville, but they also operated kilns at Gawler, owned clay pits at Cherry Gardens, Reynella, and Golden Grove.

=== Nubrick Hallett ===
Hallett Bricks Industries became an incorporated company in 1962, after merging with Victorian company Brick and Pipe Industries Limited, whose main brand was Nubrik, and built a huge new brickworks at Golden Grove. The Torrensville site closed in 1977. The Torrensville brickyard was closed in 1977 and the brand name changed to Nubrik Hallett (also referred to as Hallett Nubrik) around 1985. In 1989 the Nubrik Hallett Group sold its properties at Allenby Gardens and Lonsdale to building developers.

Nubrik Hallett was later absorbed into Austral Bricks. The company's Welland/Allenby Gardens brickworks was demolished in 1993.

== Torrensville brickworks site ==
The Hoffman kiln at Torrensville survived as part of the Brickworks Market. The brickworks site was converted into a lively market in the late 20th century, with a leisure complex including rides for children, and a multitude of stalls selling goods from fruit and vegetables, to crafted items, jewellery and clothing. This was demolished in 2013 to create the Brickworks Marketplace shopping centre, but the Hoffman kiln still remains.

== Job Hallett ==
Job Hallett was an active Freemason and was at one stage a councillor for the Town of Hindmarsh. He married Ann Jeanes in 1879 and they had two daughters, Annie and Sarah, who died in infancy, and a son Thomas Job who became his partner in the business. Upon Ann's death in 1904 he married Caroline Jane Grinter and they left four sons: Jack, Geoffrey, Charles ("Charlie") and George; and one daughter, Nancy (Mrs N. L. Sellars). At the time of his death Job had ten grandchildren.

== Thomas Hallett ==
Thomas Hallett was councillor for the ward of Brompton in the Town of Hindmarsh council from 1907 to 1910 or perhaps later.

He was chairman of directors of Littlehampton Brick Co. Ltd. from at least 1945, H. G. Willcox, a son of Charles Willcox, was a director of this company.
