= Hullett Provincial Wildlife Area =

Wetland habitat in Ontario, Canada

Coordinates: 43.6°N 81.5°W

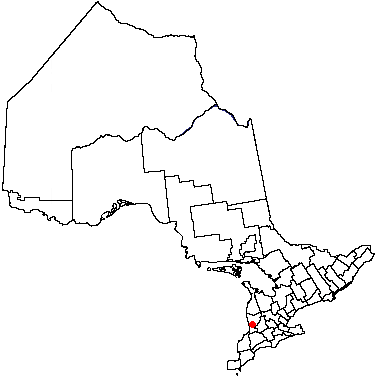

Hullett Provincial Wildlife Area (HPWA) is a major wetland habitat in southwestern Ontario, east of Clinton, which was developed in a partnership between the Ministry of Natural Resources and Ducks Unlimited Canada. It consists of 2200 hectares of mixed terrain of which almost 40% is open water, marsh or swamp and provides a habitat for resident and migrant birds, mammals, reptiles, amphibians and plants. It is home to the Green Dragon, Arisaema dracontium, a plant listed as vulnerable in Canada. It is managed by a volunteer organization, the Friends of Hullett, to benefit the wildlife of the area and provide day-use recreation activities.

== History ==
In 1960s and 1970s land along a 7.5 km stretch of the South Maitland River, a tributary of the Maitland River, was purchased by the government of Ontario for the establishment of an area to conserve wetlands. Over 80% of wetlands in the surrounding area had been lost to agricultural development. In 1979 the Ministry of Natural Resources signed a 99-year agreement with Ducks Unlimited to design, construct and maintain the wetlands. The majority of the work, including the construction of 18 km of dykes on the floodplain of the South Maitland River, was completed by 1983. In the 1990s cutbacks in government funding required that management of Hullett Provincial Wildlife Area be assumed by a volunteer organization, the Friends of Hullett and that organization was incorporated in 1998.
