= George Hallett =

George Hallett may refer to:

- George E. Hallett, architect with Hallett & Rawson, Iowa
- George E. A. Hallett (1890–1982), pioneer aviator
- George Hallett (photographer) (1942–2020), Cape Town photographer
- George Hervey Hallett Jr. (1895–1985), civic advocate and naturalist
