= Hallett, Missouri =

Extinct town in Mississippi, United States

Coordinates: 36.9003305°N 89.3222967°W

Hallett is an extinct town in Mississippi County, in the U.S. state of Missouri.

The community was named after Frank and Miles Howlett, the original owners of the town site.
