= Jean-Pierre Hallet =

Belgian ethnologist and naturalist

Jean-Pierre Hallet (1927 – 1 January 2004) was a Belgian (born in DR Congo) ethnologist, naturalist, and humanitarian known best for his extensive work with the Efé (Bambuti) pygmies of the Ituri Rainforest. He wrote the 1964 autobiographical book, Congo Kitabu, the 1973 ethnologic book Pygmy Kitabu (a more detailed description of life with the Efé and neighboring pygmies), and the 1968 book Animal Kitabu, which details his extraordinary collection of animals in the Congo and in Kenya. He initiated the Pygmy Fund for the benefit of the Efé.

== Early life ==
Hallet's father was André Hallet, a Belgian painter of African scenes. He lived on the shore of Lake Kivu, in modern Rwanda. Jean-Pierre, born in Africa, spent his early childhood there. He was then sent to Belgium with relatives for his "formal" education, which included the study of agronomy and sociology at the University of Brussels (1945–1946) and at the Sorbonne (1947–1948).

During 1948 he returned to Central Africa to work as an agronomist with the Belgian Ministry of Colonies. It was in this capacity that he initially traveled throughout central Africa, interacting with various cultures and tribes.

Both the art works of André Hallet and many pieces from Jean-Pierre Hallet's African art collections have been sold at international art auctions. Hallet donated much of his Central African art collection to the UCLA African Art exhibit of the Museum of Cultural History (later renamed the Fowler Museum), which was part of the rationale for the museum's creation.

Hallet and his family owned one of the largest authentic Central African art shops in the United States—at the Third Street Promenade in Santa Monica, California, near Los Angeles—until the late 1990s. The shop was managed by Hallet with his wife Liane Hallet, and two of his stepchildren. Some of the profit from these art sales was used to benefit the Efé pygmies.

He returned to the Eastern Congo region to visit the Efé (and friends he had made during several decades) and to further his goals of securing land and protection for the Efé. In one instance he was captured by rebel forces in Eastern Congo during the First Congo War and detained until Congolese troops were able to free him.

== Awards and international recognition ==
Hallet was awarded the National Order of the Leopard in Zaire (now the Democratic Republic of the Congo) for his efforts on behalf of the Efé.

In 1987, Jean-Pierre Hallet won the US Presidential End Hunger Award, and by 1994 the Pygmy Fund had reached 46% of their goal of securing 500 acres (2.0 km^{2}) of good farming land for the pygmies in the Congo.

He received more than 100 awards and honors and was a featured speaker internationally, including at the Explorer's Club. He met with Dwight D. Eisenhower, and for his humanitarian efforts has been described as the "Abe Lincoln of the Congo".

Hallet was nominated for the Nobel Peace prize for his work with the Pygmies.

== Books ==
Congo Kitabu, Pygmy Kitabu, and Animal Kitabu have been translated into 21 languages, including Chinese and Russian, and a Reader's Digest version of Congo Kitabu was also released. The word kitabu means bible, or book, in Swahili.

=== Congo Kitabu ===
Congo Kitabu is an auto-biographical book about Hallet's travels through central Africa from 1948 through 1960. In it he documents interactions with multiple isolated cultures throughout the Belgian Congo, Rwanda and Burundi regions. His accounts provide a unique anthropological source of information of the valley of the River Congo during that period.

He wrote about in detail of his encounters with the Luba people, the Kuba Kingdom, the Balega (in the historically cannibalistic areas of Maniema, including the Bwame secret society), the Efe Pygmies of the Ituri forest and the neighboring Balese, the Tutsi of Rwanda, the Maasai people of Kenya, the Bagoma people, and the pygmoid Bamosso of Burundi. He also had encounters with multiple other cultures, including the Balamba (near Zambia), the Bahutu (Rwanda), Bahunde, the Bambuba, the Batalinga, and the pygmoid Batwa of Rwanda.

Hallet's accounts include those of extensive personal participation with cultural activities of the region, including secretive and forbidden (by the Belgian colonial government) practices. In several chapters of the book are described some of his first encounters with the Efe pygmies of the Ituri forest.

Hallet was an avid collector of art and lover of animals as well, and the book is documented liberally with photographs from the period.

The collection of art that he collected during the described journeys in the book eventually became a large portion of the UCLA African Art premier exhibit in 1963–1965, when Hallet donated much of it to the university. This collection is now part of the UCLA Fowler Museum.

Hallet also sold additional artifacts that he collected during the travels described in the book (and during many subsequent return visits to the Congo) and used the profits to help protect the Efé. He describes the events related to multiple significant artifacts, giving the reader a vivid background to their origin.

=== Pygmy Kitabu ===
Pygmy Kitabu is based on the travels of Jean-Pierre Hallet through central Africa from 1948 through 1960 and his extensive interactions with the isolated Efé Pygmies of the Congo. It was first published during 1973, and was cowritten by Alex Pelle. Unlike his prior book, Congo Kitabu, which chronicled his contacts and investigations into multiple groups in the Congo and nearby regions, Pygmy Kitabu is a detailed observational study primarily of the Efe Pygmies. Great detail and scientific observational method was used in the writing of the book.

The Efé Pygmies have been shown to be one of the oldest intact cultures on Earth by dNA studies, and this book is an in-depth work detailing their extraordinary culture.

The book Pygmy Kitabu was reviewed by another expert on Mbuti pygmy culture, Colin Turnbull, and its contribution to knowledge of the pygmy culture acknowledged. It has also been used as a reference in a linguistics textbook. It has been cited in scholarly books, journals, and symposia.

=== Animal Kitabu ===
Hallet raised multiple animals while living in Ruanda-Urundi, near the border of the Congo. He trained a lion, played ball with a rhino, and watched the courtship of his rhino and elephant. His extensive menagerie allowed him an insight into animal behaviour that is further explored in Animal Kitabu.

During 1960, due to the increasing ethnic conflicts in the area, he was forced to take drastic measures on behalf of his beloved animals when he escaped to Kenya. There he faced new challenges and enlisted the aid of sympathetic allies to help care for his extended "family." His amusing observations of animals (such as that of smartest cat—- the leopard) and man in Kenya and Uganda and some serendipitous nature photographs were published in magazines in Central Africa.

== Documentaries and movies ==
=== Pygmies (1973) ===
During 1973, Hallet filmed a documentary named Pygmies that documents the customs of this disappearing culture. It was released simultaneously with the book Pygmy Kitabu.

Filmed during 1972 on location, the movie was originally titled Pygmies—- An Epic of the Golden Age and previewed at the Academy Award Theater in Los Angeles. However, the movie was rejected by major distributors for lack of commercial appeal and was limited to a small run by a local theater circuit in San Francisco, California (sponsored by the California Academy of Sciences and the San Francisco Zoologic Society).

=== The Pygmies of the Ituri Forest (1975) ===
Produced by Jean-Pierre Hallet Productions (Belgium) during 1975 and distributed by the Encyclopædia Britannica Educational Corporation, The Pygmies of the Ituri Forest is the educational counterpart to the movie Pygmies.

=== Over the Edge—People in Extraordinary Situations (1989) ===
Hallet appeared in the third episode of this ABC 1989 documentary series of people who go to unexpected extremes in amazing circumstances.

== Music ethnologies ==
- Echoes of the Forest: Music of the Central African Pygmies (The Musical Expeditions Series/Book and Compact Disc) (Audio CD and book, March 1995)

This 18-track CD includes 7 tracks compiled from Hallet's collection of musical recordings of the Efe Pygmies, Colin Turnbull's original recordings of the pygmies, and Louis Sarno's recordings of the Ba-benzele pygmies (Bayaka). The accompanying book by Louis Sarno explores the music from his collection.
