= Hallett Cove =

Hallett Cove may refer to:

== United States ==
- Hallett's Cove, the name of the original village that later became Astoria, Queens

== South Australia ==
- Hallett Cove, South Australia, a suburb in the Adelaide metropolitan area
- Hallett Cove Conservation Park, a protected area
- Hallett Cove railway station
- Hallett Cove School

== See also ==
- Hallett Cove Beach railway station
