= André Hallet =

Belgian painter (1890–1959)

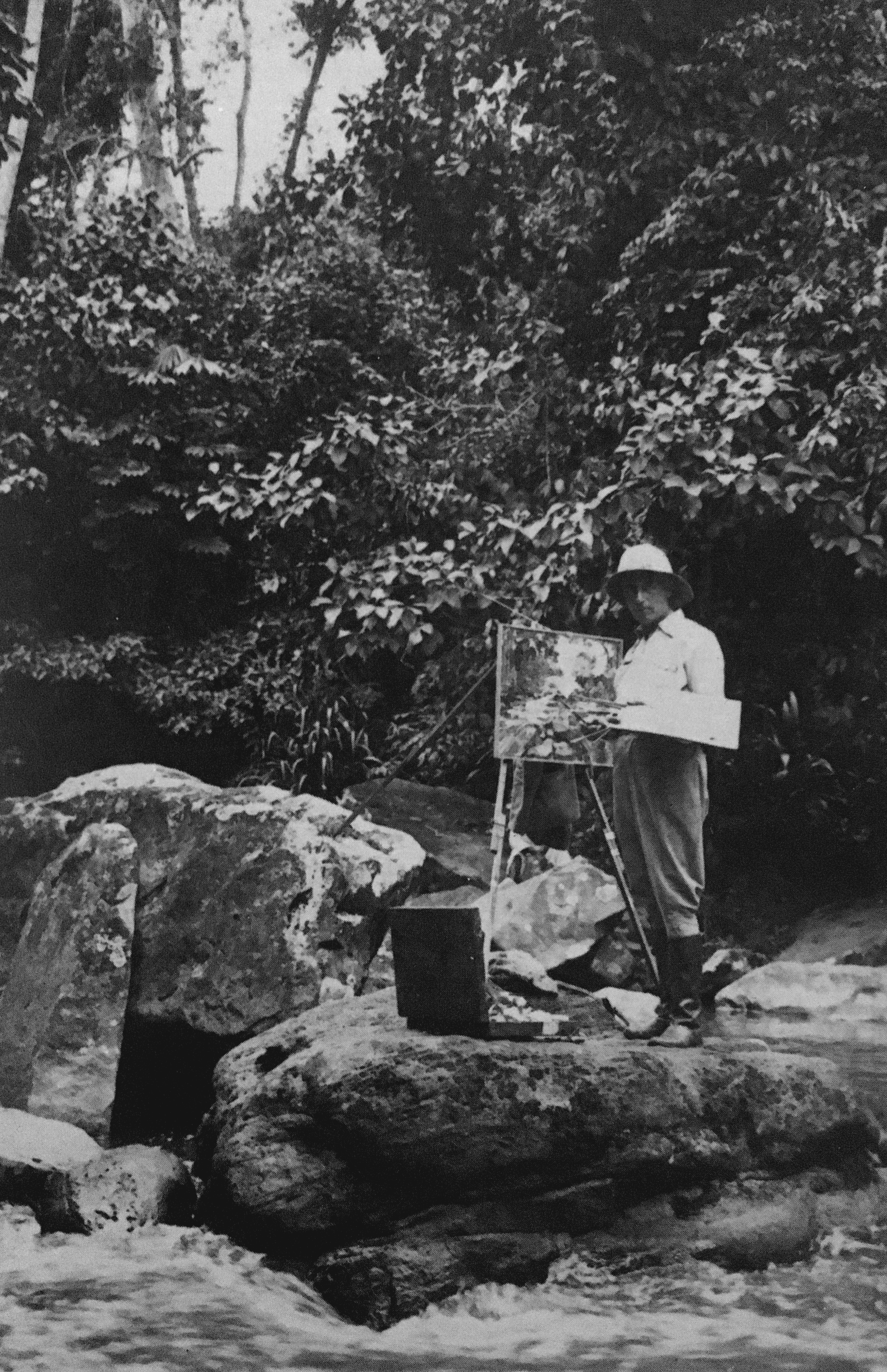
André Hallet in Gombe-Matadi (1935)

André Hallet (1890–1959) was a Belgian post-impressionist painter whose paintings have been exhibited at more than 60 museums worldwide, including the Louvre in Paris, France.

His most well-known paintings are those of the Congo and around Lake Kivu (in modern-day Rwanda).

He was initially sent to the Congo by the Belgian government in 1934 and then settled in Kisenyi (modern-day Rwanda), on the shores of Lake Kivu, in 1947, where he died in 1959.

In 1934 he forged a relationship with the Tutsi king Mwambi Matura III (of Ruanda-Burundi) and painted a series of detailed portraits of the king’s family and court.

Prior to his African period, he painted scenes of southern France, Naples, Capri, and Sicily, when he traveled through these areas as a young man. This was known as his European period.

His paintings have been sold at auction houses for record prices.

He is the father of Jean-Pierre Hallet, an internationally recognized human-rights activist (on the behalf of the Efe pygmies in the Ituri forest of the Congo) who also lived in the Congo and Rwanda and was also an avid art collector.

His paintings have been donated by the André Hallet Foundation for charitable causes, such as to "Medicins sans Frontiere" to aid Cambodian orphans in 1992, and to Association des Anciens du Congo (A.F.A.C), a philanthropic concern for the oldest civilizations still living in the Congo, and to the International Foundation Jacques Brel for cancer research.
