= Harold Foster Hallett =

British philosopher

Harold Foster Hallet (1886 – 1966), was a British philosopher

== Work ==
He is the author of numerous books and articles on philosophy; most noteworthy is his seminal work in the philosophy of Baruch Spinoza. His "Spinoza The Elements of His Philosophy" stands as the most comprehensive and erudite analysis of Spinoza's system in the entire extant.

The book employs sophisticated philosophical language, much which appears to be usages uniquely employed to capture in intricate detail all of the interrelationships or 'potency in act' among Substance, Attribute and the Modalities. This detail allows Hallett to display the complete unity and self-evident truth value in the "Ethics" and related Spinoza writings.

Appointments

From 1904 to 1908 - shipyard of Messrs Young and Co at Poplar.

1908 - BSc in Engineering from the University of London.

In 1912 he gained an M.A. in Mental Philosophy from the University of Edinburgh.

In 1912–1916 - Lecturer in Logic, and Assistant in Logic and Metaphysics.

In 1915–1916 - Assistant in Moral Philosophy.

In 1919–1922 - Assistant Lecturer at the University of Leeds.

In 1922–1931 - Lecturer in Philosophy at the University of Leeds.

In 1930 he received a D.Litt. from the University of Edinburgh.

From 1931 to 1951 - Professor of Philosophy at King's College London.

In 1929–1935 Hallett was the British secretary of the Societas Spinoza.

From 1935–1945, he was chairman of the Board of Philosophical Studies at the University of London.
