= Hallett Peak =

Mountain in Colorado, United States

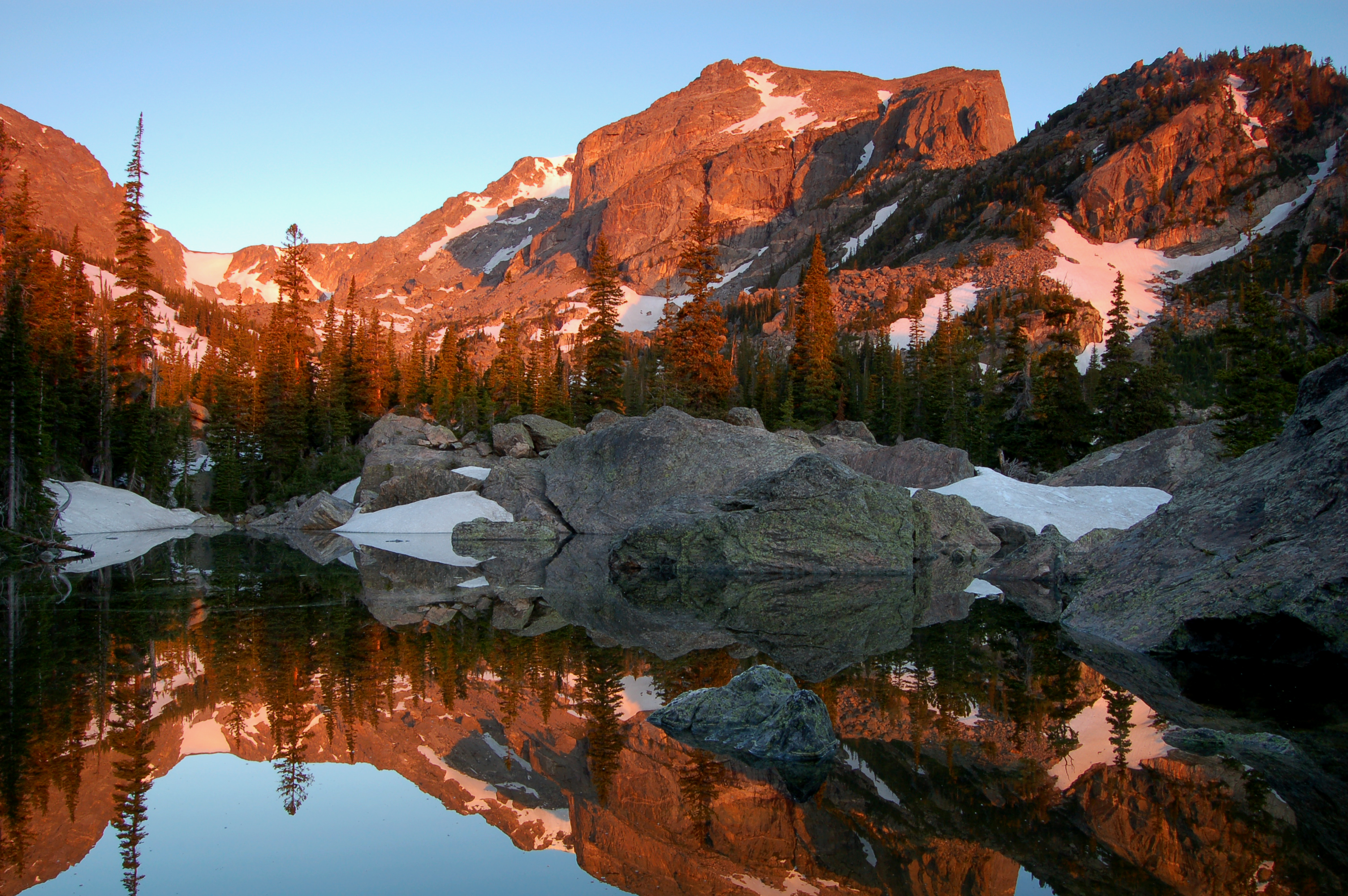
- Hallett Peak reflected in Lake Haiyaha at sunrise

Highest point
- Elevation: 12,720 ft (3,877 m)
- Prominence: 733 ft (223 m)
- Isolation: 1.97 mi (3.17 km)
- Coordinates: 40°18′11″N 105°41′09″W

Naming
- Etymology: William L. Hallett

Geography
- Location within Colorado
- Location: Continental Divide in Rocky Mountain National Park between Grand and Larimer counties, Colorado, U.S.
- Parent range: Front Range
- Topo map(s): USGS 7.5' topographic map McHenrys Peak, Colorado

Climbing
- Easiest route: hike

Hallett Peak (Arapaho: Bonoh'ooonoteyoo') is a mountain summit in the northern Front Range of the Rocky Mountains of North America. The 12,720-foot (3,877 m) peak is located in the Rocky Mountain National Park Wilderness, 10.1 miles (16.2 km) southwest by west (bearing 240°) of the Town of Estes Park, Colorado, United States, on the Continental Divide between Grand and Larimer counties.

== Mountain ==
Hallett Peak is on the Continental Divide, flanked by Flattop Mountain to the north and Otis Peak to the south. Just to its east lie Emerald Lake, Dream Lake, and Nymph Lake, access to which is usually from the Bear Lake Comfort Station.

The Northcutt-Carter Route of Hallett Peak is recognized in the historic climbing text Fifty Classic Climbs of North America. Non-technical climbers may reach the summit of Hallett Peak by hiking up the Flattop Mountain Trail to its highpoint, then walking south along the ridgeline and ascending the peak over talus piles.

== Etymology ==
The mountain is named for William L. Hallett (1856–1947), an outstanding mountain climber and one of the founders of the Rocky Mountain Club. Hallett arrived in the Estes Park area as a young MIT-trained engineer on vacation in 1878. He became enamored with the area and decided to remain, and became a rancher based in Loveland, Colorado. The mountain's toponym was officially adopted in 1932 by the United States Board on Geographic Names.

In the Arapaho language the mountain is named bonoh'ooonoteyoo' or Thunder Peak.

== Climate ==
According to the Köppen climate classification system, Hallett Peak is located in an alpine subarctic climate zone with cold, snowy winters, and cool to warm summers. Due to its altitude, it receives precipitation all year, as snow in winter and as thunderstorms in summer, with a dry period in late spring.

== Gallery ==
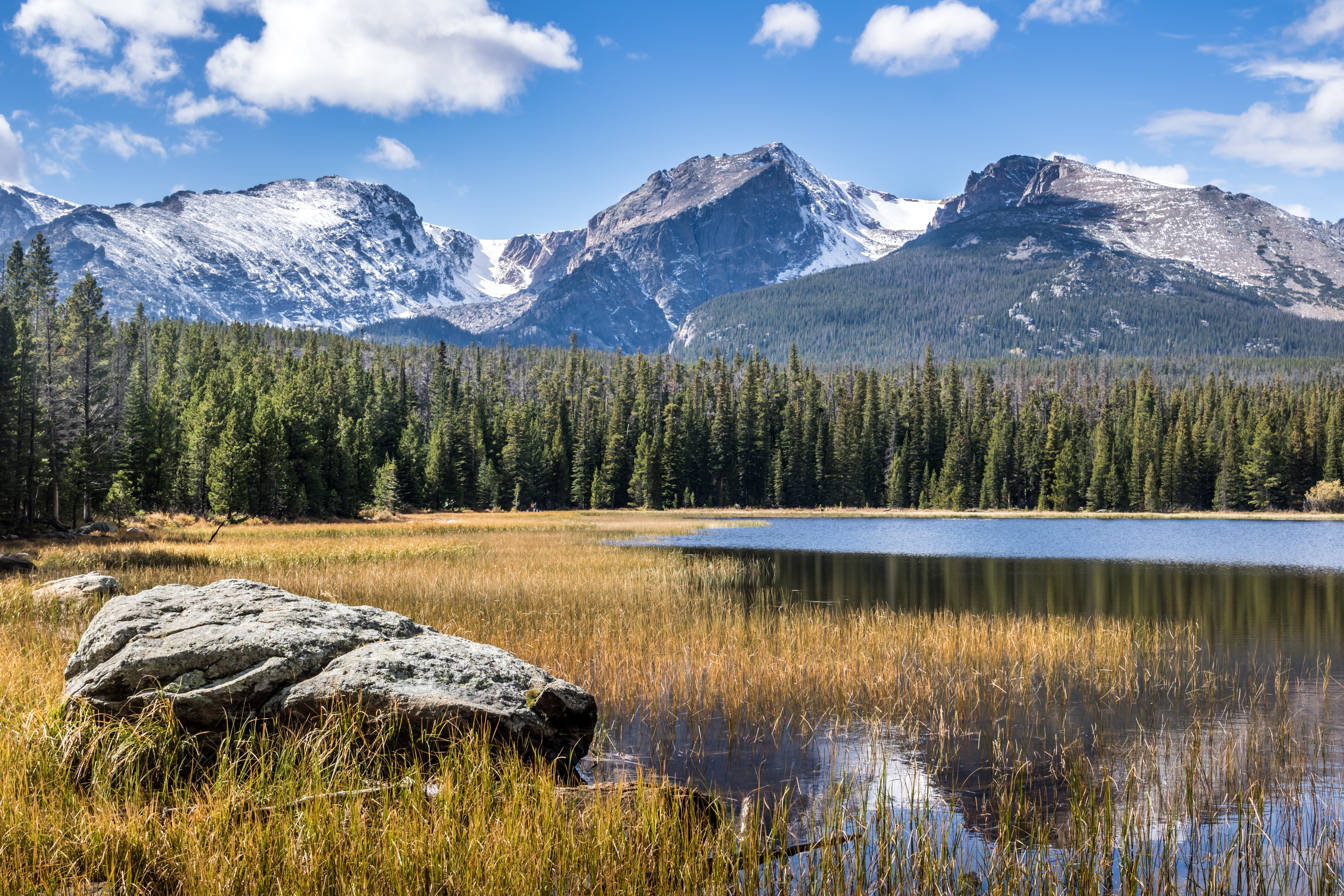
Otis Peak (left), Hallett Peak (center), Flattop Mountain (right)

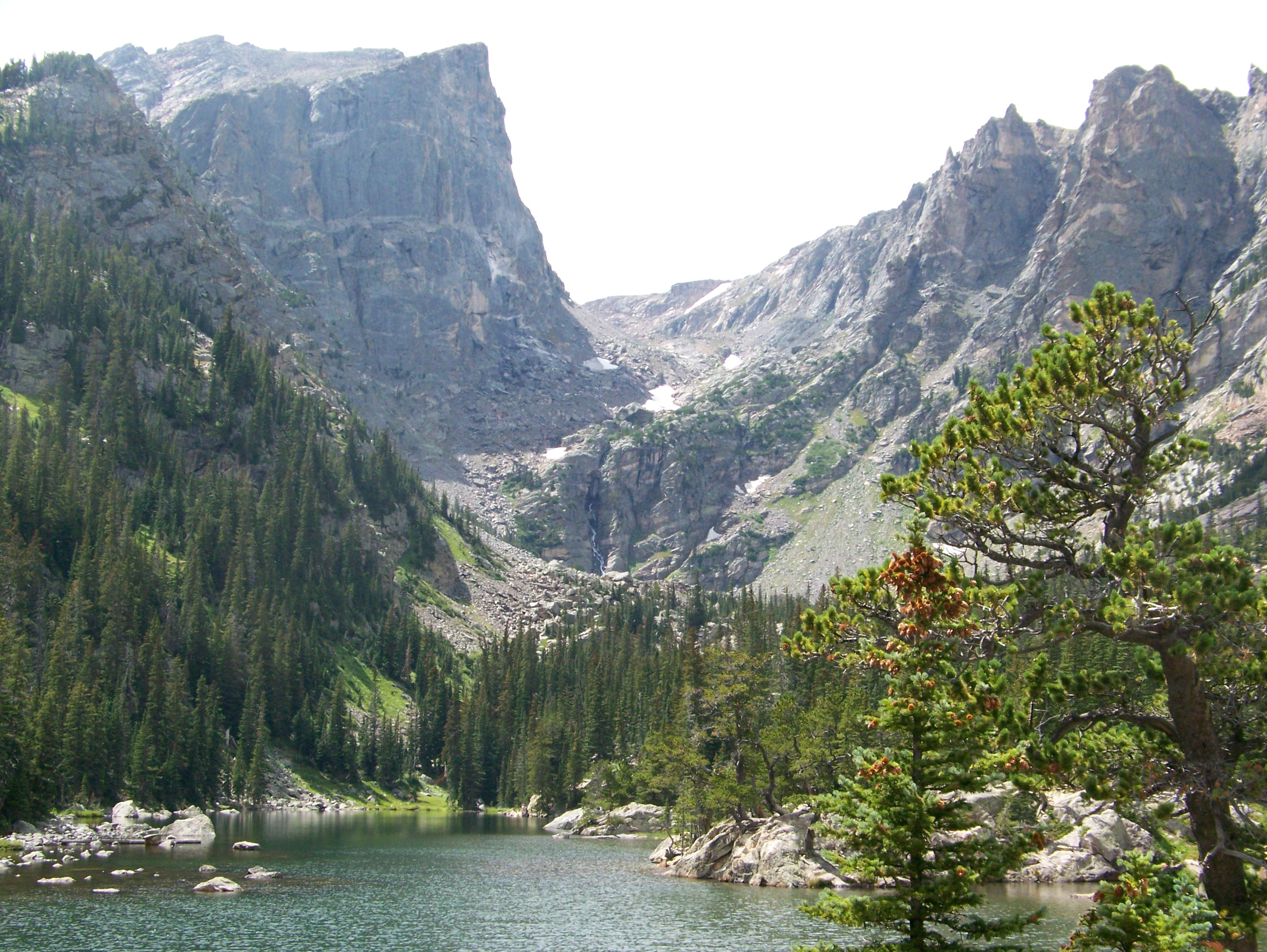
Looking west over Dream Lake. Hallett Peak is on the left with the dramatic cliff band and prominent point.

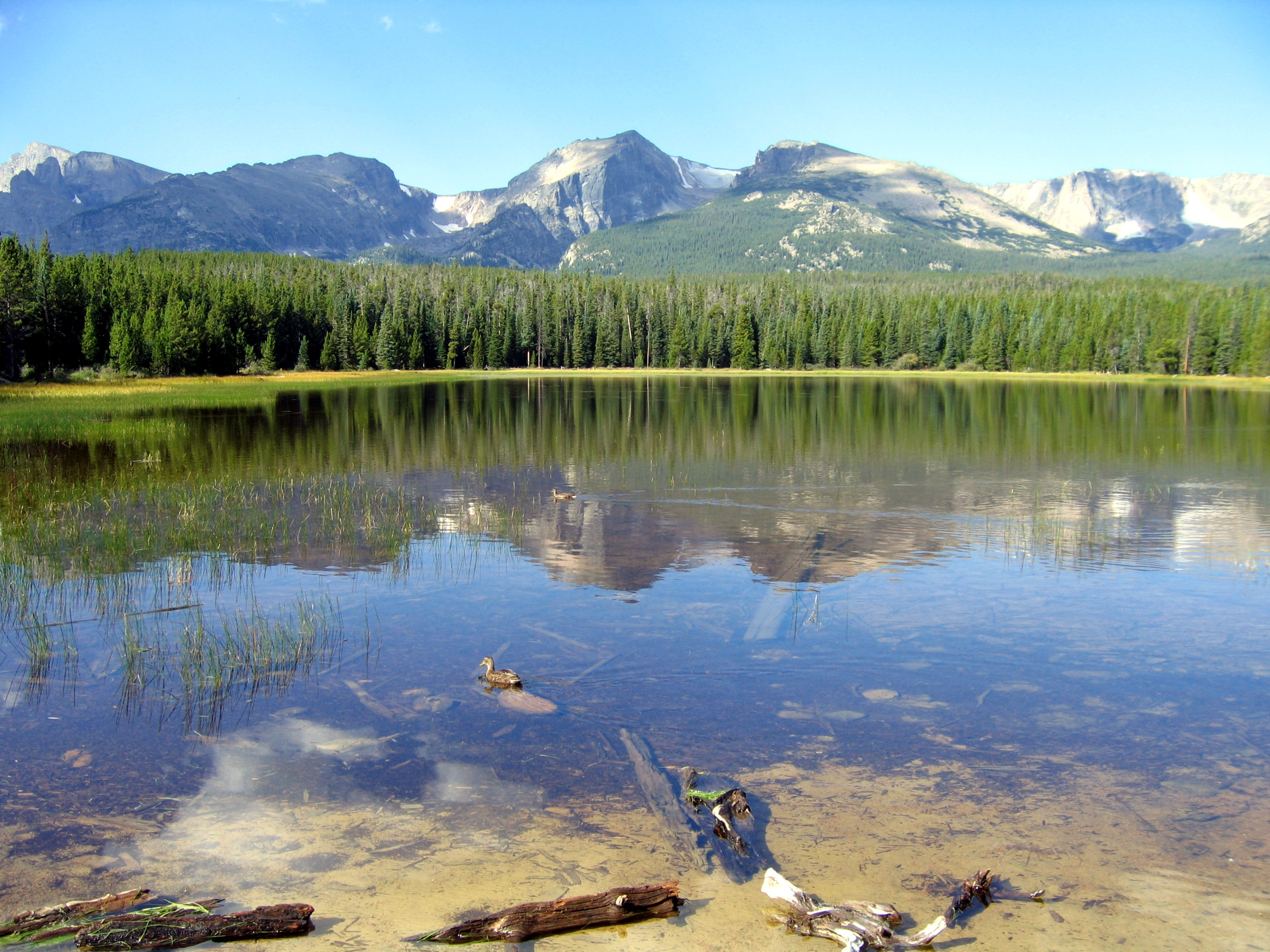
A view from Bierstadt Lake. Hallett Peak is at the center, flanked on the left by Otis Peak, with Flattop Mountain and Ptarmigan Point on the right.

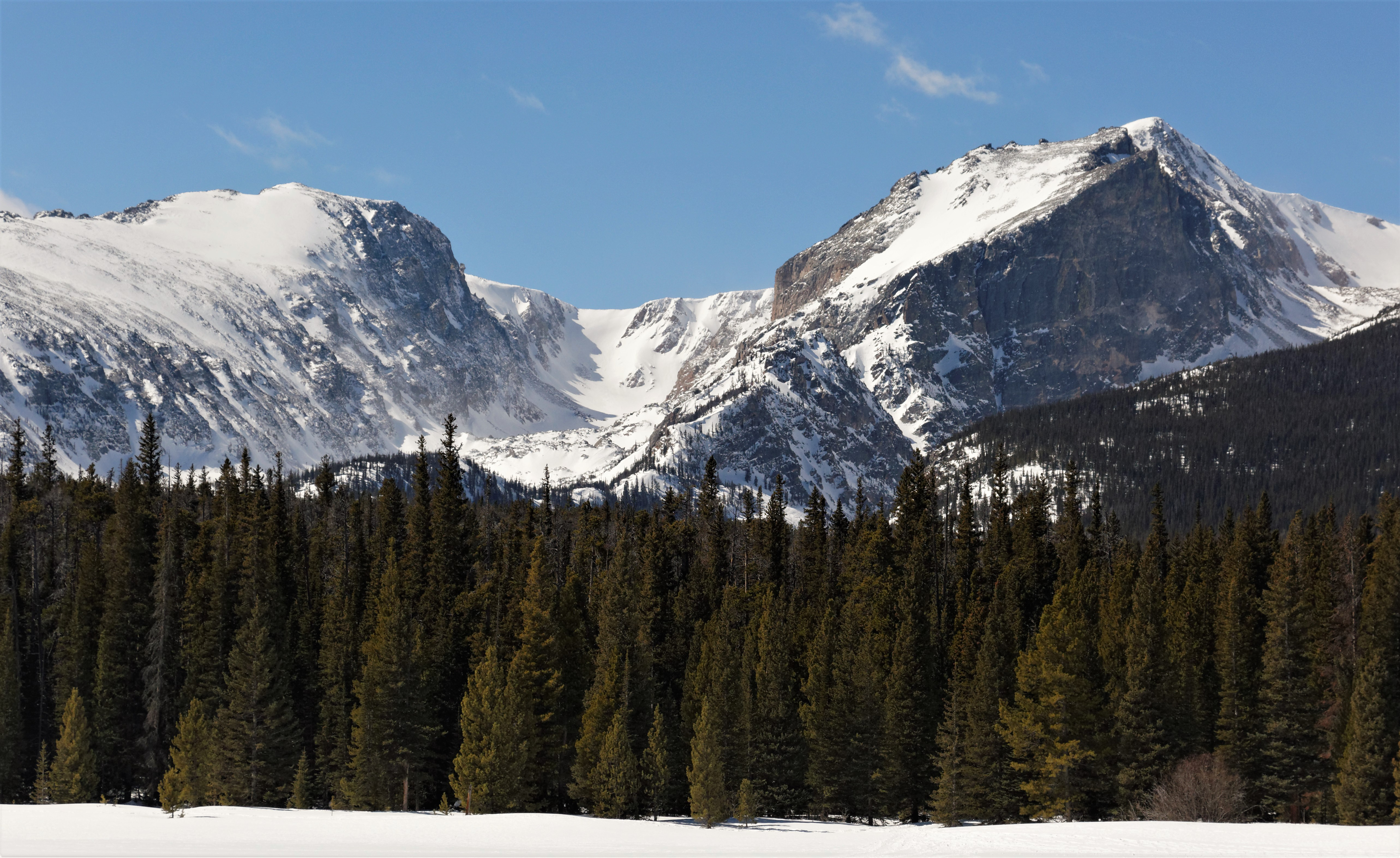
Otis Peak (left) and Hallett Peak from northeast

== See also ==
- List of Colorado mountain ranges
- List of Colorado mountain summits
  - List of Colorado fourteeners
  - List of Colorado 4000 meter prominent summits
  - List of the most prominent summits of Colorado
- List of Colorado county high points
- List of peaks in Rocky Mountain National Park
