= List of peaks in Rocky Mountain National Park =

Map
Create a map of all Rocky Mountain National Park peak coordinates using this OpenStreetMap (OSM) link

The list of peaks in Rocky Mountain National Park includes the following:

Trailhead	Image	Peak	Height	Location
Bear Lake		Flattop Mountain	12,326 ft / 3,757 m	40.309°N 105.690°W
Bear Lake		Hallett Peak	12,598 ft / 3,840 m	40.303°N 105.686°W
Bear Lake		Hayden Spire	12,421 ft / 3,786 m	40.351°N 105.740°W
Bear Lake		Knobtop Mountain	12,336 ft / 3,760 m	40.324°N 105.701°W
Bear Lake		Little Matterhorn	11,532 ft / 3,515 m	40.327°N 105.692°W
Bear Lake		Notchtop Mountain	11,929/ ft / 3,636 m	40.318°N 105.694°W
Bear Lake		Ptarmigan Point	12,270 ft / 3,740 m	40.313°N 105.701°W
Bear Lake		Snowdrift Peak	12,205 ft / 3,720 m	40.310°N 105.743°W
Chapin Pass		Desolation Peaks	12,674 ft / 3,863 m	40.472°N 105.693°W
Chapin Pass		Mount Chapin	12,438 ft / 3,791 m	40.433°N 105.701°W
Chapin Pass		Mount Chiquita (center)	13,051 ft / 3,978 m	40.443°N 105.688°W
Chapin Pass		Ypsilon Mountain	13,445 ft / 4,098 m	40.456°N 105.681°W
Colorado River		Howard Mountain	12,762 ft / 3,890 m	40.426°N 105.898°W
Colorado River		Lead Mountain	12,474 ft / 3,802 m	40.448°N 105.897°W
Colorado River		Lulu Mountain	12,201 ft / 3,719 m	40.479°N 105.862°W
Colorado River		Mount Cirrus	12,730 ft / 3,880 m	40.434°N 105.901°W
Colorado River		Mount Cumulus	12,733 ft / 3,881 m	40.410°N 105.902°W
Colorado River		Mount Nimbus	12,644 ft / 3,854 m	40.396°N 105.904°W
Colorado River		Mount Stratus	12,534 ft / 3,820 m	40.390°N 105.904°W
Colorado River		Baker Mountain	12,410 ft / 3,780 m	40.381°N 105.906°W
Cow Creek		Dark Mountain	10,827 ft / 3,300 m	40.432°N 105.5719°W
East Inlet		Mount Craig	12,008 ft / 3,660 m	40.219°N 105.7281°W
Emmaline Lake		Comanche Peak	12,690 ft / 3,868 m	40.548°N 105.677°W
Emmaline Lake		Fall Mountain	12,257 ft / 3,736 m	40.528°N 105.661°W
Fern Lake		Stones Peak	12,894 ft / 3,930 m	40.354°N 105.721°W
Glacier Gorge		Arrowhead	12,651 ft / 3,856 m	40.268°N 105.650°W
Glacier Gorge		Chiefs Head Peak	13,579 ft / 4,121 m	40.249°N 105.641°W
Glacier Gorge		Half Mountain	11,437 ft / 3,486 m	40.290°N 105.633°W
Glacier Gorge		McHenrys Peak	13,327 ft / 4,062 m	40.263°N 105.658°W
Glacier Gorge		Otis Peak	12,444 ft / 3,793	40.292°N 105.680°W
Glacier Gorge		Pagoda Mountain	13,392 ft / 4,082 m	40.251°N 105.626°W
Glacier Gorge		Petit Grepon	12,000 ft / 3,658 m	40.280°N 105.673°W
Glacier Gorge		Powell Peak	13,149 ft / 4,008 m	40.2658°N 105.6647°W
Glacier Gorge		The Sharkstooth	12,411 ft / 3,783 m	40.280°N 105.674°W
Glacier Gorge		The Spearhead	12,533 ft / 3,820 m	40.255°N 105.638°W
Glacier Gorge		Taylor Peak	13,117 ft / 3,998 m	40.274°N 105.680°W
Glacier Gorge		Thatchtop	12,657 ft / 3,858 m	40.279°N 105.653°W
Green Mountain		Nakai Peak	11,916 ft / 3,632 m	40.346°N 105.776°W
Green Mountain		Sprague Mountain	12,697 ft / 3,870 m	40.347°N 105.736°W
Lake Agnes		Mount Richthofen	12,890 ft / 3,929 m	40.469°N 105.895°W
Lake Agnes		Static Peak	12,575 ft / 3,833 m	40.477°N 105.892°W
Lake Agnes		Tepee Mountain	12,306 ft / 3,751 m	40.463°N 105.899°W
Lawn Lake		Fairchild Mountain	13,508 ft / 4,116 m	40.468°N 105.664°W
Lawn Lake		Hagues Peak	13,570 ft / 4,096 m	40.485°N 105.646°W
Lawn Lake		Mummy Mountain	13,382 ft / 4,079 m	40.476°N 105.626°W
Lawn Lake		Rowe Peak	13,399 ft / 4,084 m	40.490°N 105.645°W
Longs Peak		Estes Cone	11,010 ft / 3,356 m	40.295°N 105.567°W
Longs Peak		Longs Peak	14,258 ft / 4,346 m	40.255°N 105.616°W
Longs Peak		Mount Lady Washington	13,245 ft / 4,037 m	40.263°N 105.607°W
Longs Peak		Mount Meeker (left)	13,868 ft / 4,227 m	40.249°N 105.605°W
Longs Peak		Storm Peak	13,320 ft / 4,060 m	40.266°N 105.6205°W
Lumpy Ridge		Lumpy Ridge / The Needles	10,059 ft / 3,066 m	40.416°N 105.551°W
Meeker Park		Horsetooth Peak	10,341 ft / 3,152 m	40.232°N 105.560°W
Meeker Park		Lookout Mountain	10,702 ft / 3,262 m	40.227°N 105.565°W
Milner Pass		Chief Cheley Peak	12,815 ft / 3,906 m	40.367°N 105.774°W
Milner Pass		Cracktop	12,762 ft / 3,890 m	40.366°N 105.766°W
Milner Pass		Mount Ida	12,844 ft / 3,915 m	40.372°N 105.779°W
Milner Pass		Mount Julian	12,920 ft / 3,938 m	40.371°N 105.758°W
Milner Pass		Terra Tomah Mountain	12,693 ft / 3,869 m	40.3763°N 105.750°W
Saint Vrain Mountain		Meadow Mountain	11,634 ft / 3,546 m	40.175°N 105.570°W
Saint Vrain Mountain		Saint Vrain Mountain	12,149 ft / 3,703 m	40.161°N 105.585°W
Stormy Peaks		Stormy Peaks	12,113 ft / 3,692 m	40.520°N 105.587°W
Trail Ridge Road		Sundance Mountain	12,447 ft / 3,794 m	40.408°N 105.711°W
Twin Sisters		Twin Sisters Peaks	11,332 ft / 3,454 m	40.289°N 105.518°W
Wild Basin		Copeland Mountain	13,166 ft / 4,013 m	40.182°N 105.646°W
Wild Basin		Elk Tooth	12,848 ft / 3,916 m	40.168°N 105.654°W
Wild Basin		Isolation Peak	13,067 ft / 3,983 m	40.203°N 105.677°W
Wild Basin		Mount Alice	13,281 ft / 4,048 m	40.239°N 105.663°W
Wild Basin		Ogalalla Peak	13,081 ft / 3,987 m	40.170°N 105.667°W
Wild Basin		Ouzel Peak	12,677 ft / 3,864 m	40.186°N 105.671°W
Wild Basin		Pilot Mountain	12,113 ft / 3,692 m	40.231°N 105.658°W
Wild Basin		The Cleaver	12,178 / 3,712	40.217°N 105.671°W
