= Thatchtop =

Mountain in the American state of Colorado

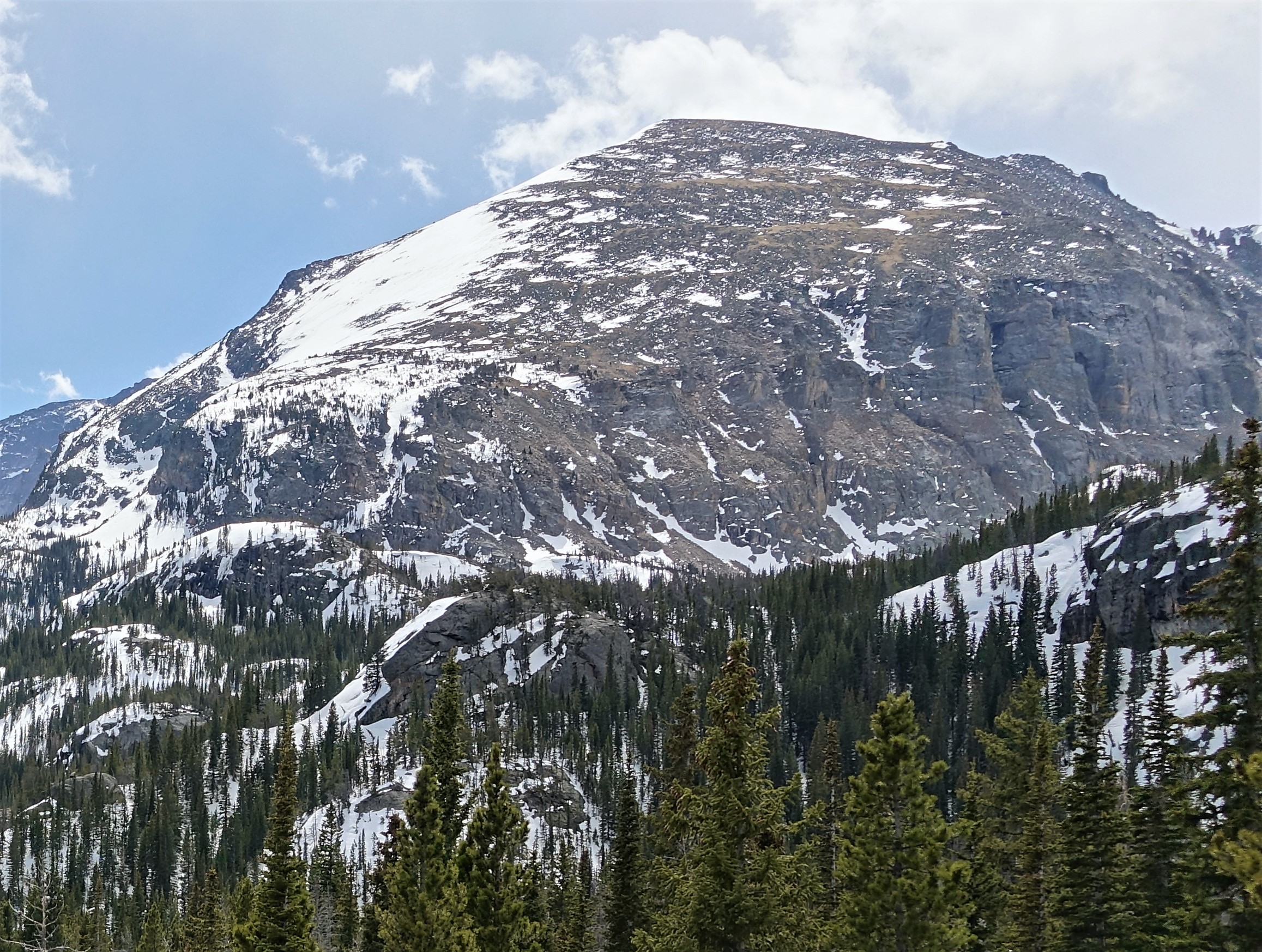
- North aspect

Highest point
- Elevation: 12,668 ft (3,861 m)
- Prominence: 94 ft (29 m)
- Parent peak: Powell Peak (13,176 ft)
- Isolation: 1.11 mi (1.79 km)
- Coordinates: 40°16′45″N 105°39′11″W

Geography
- Location within Colorado Location within the United States
- Country: United States
- State: Colorado
- County: Larimer
- Protected area: Rocky Mountain National Park
- Parent range: Rocky Mountains; Front Range
- Topo map: USGS McHenrys Peak

Geology
- Rock age: Paleoproterozoic
- Rock type(s): Biotite schist and gneiss

Climbing
- Easiest route: class 2+

Thatchtop is a 12,668-foot-elevation (3,861-meter) mountain summit in Larimer County, Colorado, United States.

== Description ==
Thatchtop is set one mile east of the Continental Divide in the Front Range of the Rocky Mountains. The mountain is situated within Rocky Mountain National Park, approximately 10.5 miles (16.9 km) southwest of Estes Park. Precipitation runoff from the mountain drains into tributaries of Glacier Creek which in turn is a tributary of the Big Thompson River. Topographic relief is significant with the summit rising 2,670 feet (810 meters) above Glacier Gorge in 0.75 mile (1.21 km).

== Etymology ==
The mountain's descriptive name refers to the matted groundcover of the roof-shaped mountain. The landforms's toponym was officially adopted in 1932 by the United States Board on Geographic Names, although it appeared in publications as early as 1911 if not earlier. The Arapaho called the mountain "Buffalo Climb."

== Climate ==
According to the Köppen climate classification system, Thatchtop is located in an alpine subarctic climate zone with cold, snowy winters, and cool to warm summers. Due to its altitude, it receives precipitation all year, as snow in winter, and as thunderstorms in summer, with a dry period in late spring.

== See also ==
- List of peaks in Rocky Mountain National Park
- Mountains of Larimer County, Colorado
