= Kauffman House (Grand Lake, Colorado) =

- U.S. National Register of Historic Places
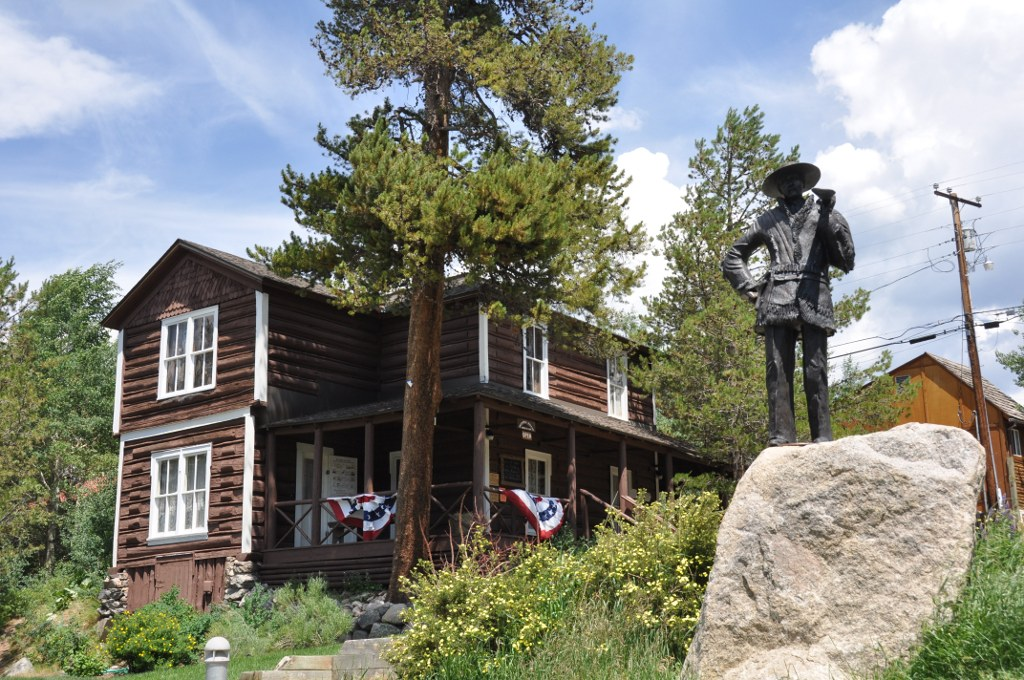

- Location within Colorado Location within the United States
- Location: NW corner of Pitkin and Lake Ave., Grand Lake, Colorado
- Coordinates: 40°15′2″N 105°49′4″W
- Built: 1892
- NRHP reference No.: 74000579
- Added to NRHP: November 21, 1974

The Kauffman House is a rustic log house in Grand Lake, Colorado that functioned as a hotel from its construction in 1892 to 1973. It was built by Ezra Kauffman, a local prospector, trapper and builder of log structures who operated it as a hotel until his death in 1920 at age 71. It was then operated as a summer hotel by his widow and daughters until World War II.

The log structure is built of timber cut, sawn and hauled by Ezra Kauffman. The logs were sawn on three sides and left rounded on the outside. Inside walls were lined with metal and a muslin facing, with wallpaper pasted to the fabric in most rooms, with colored fabric left exposed in some rooms. Oilcloth was used on the kitchen walls and ceiling. The logs were laid on a stone foundation. Gables are finished in fish-scale shingles. The house featured an indoor water supply fed from a galvanized tank in the attic, which was filled from a hand pump at the lakeshore. Water was hauled by hand in the winter.

In 1946 the Kauffmans sold the house to Henry Rhone who operated it until 1973, when the Grand Lake Historical Society purchased the house for use as a museum. It is the only pre-20th century log hotel remaining in Grand Lake.

The Kauffman House was placed on the National Register of Historic Places on November 21, 1974.

== See also ==
- National Register of Historic Places listings in Grand County, Colorado
