= Taylor Glacier (Colorado) =

Glacier in Colorado, United States

- Location within Colorado Location within the United States
- Interactive map of Taylor Glacier
- Type: Mountain glacier
- Location: Larimer County, Colorado, United States
- Coordinates: 40°16′15″N 105°40′37″W
- Terminus: Talus
- Status: Retreating

Taylor Glacier is a small cirque glacier in Rocky Mountain National Park in the U.S. state of Colorado. Taylor Glacier is on the east side of the Continental Divide and adjacent to Taylor Peak. Taylor Glacier is both an ice and a rock glacier, with the lower portions of the glacier being composed primarily of rock debris and a small portion of ice.

== See also ==
- List of glaciers in the United States
