= Chief Cheley Peak =

Mountain in Colorado, United States

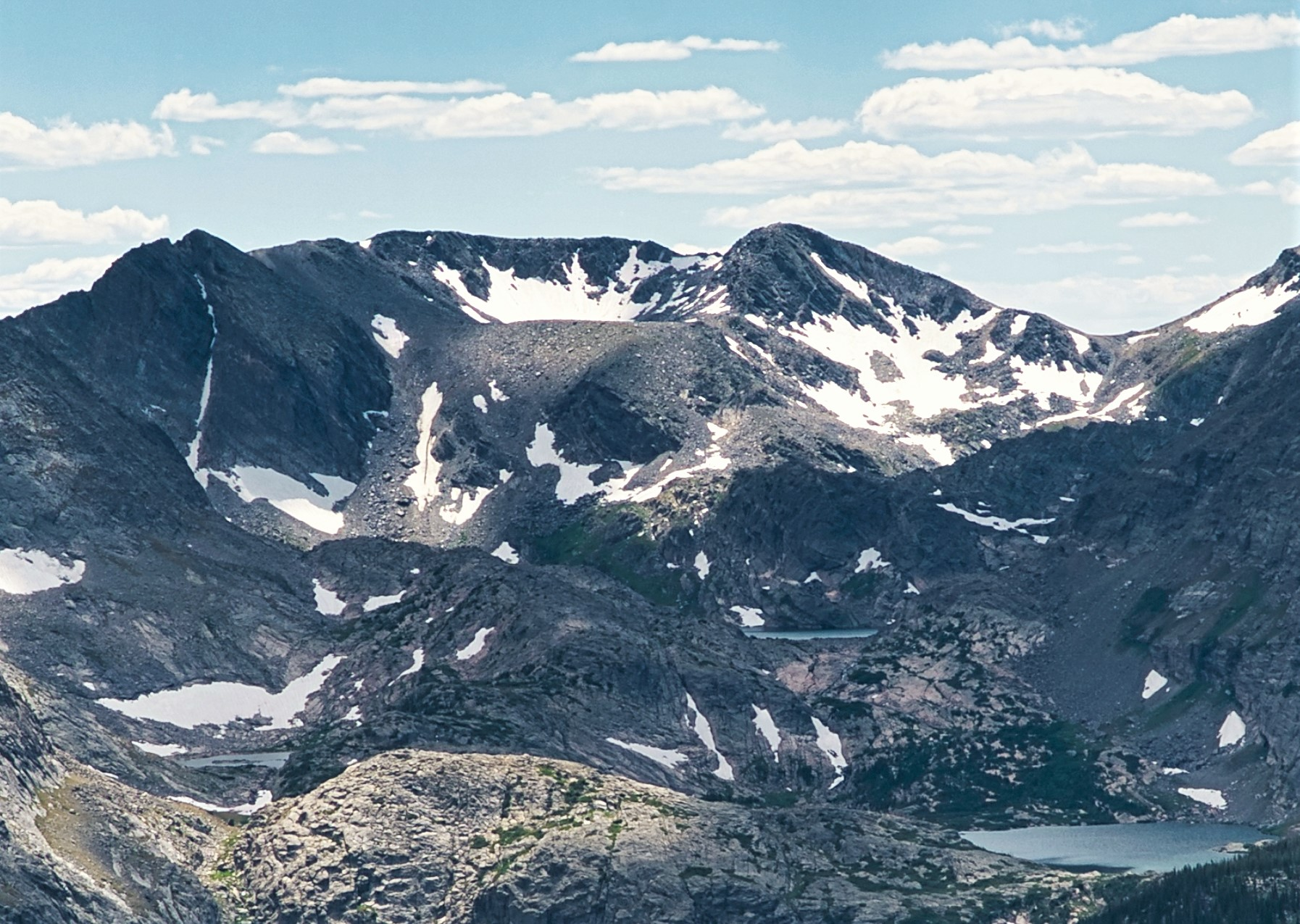
- Northeast aspect, (summit right of center)

Highest point
- Elevation: 12,815 ft (3,906 m)
- Prominence: 384 ft (117 m)
- Isolation: 0.43 mi (0.69 km)
- Coordinates: 40°22′02″N 105°46′27″W

Geography
- Location within Colorado
- Location: Rocky Mountain National Park, Grand and Larimer counties, Colorado, United States
- Parent range: Front Range
- Topo map(s): USGS 7.5' topographic map Grand Lake, Colorado

Chief Cheley Peak is a mountain summit in the northern Front Range of the Rocky Mountains of North America. The 12,815-foot (3,906 m) peak is located in the Rocky Mountain National Park Wilderness, 13.1 miles (21.1 km) west (bearing 267°) of the Town of Estes Park, Colorado, United States, on the Continental Divide between Grand and Larimer counties.

Chief Cheley Peak was named for Frank Cheley, an outdoor educator.

== Climate ==
According to the Köppen climate classification system, the mountain is located in an alpine subarctic climate zone with cold, snowy winters, and cool to warm summers. Due to its altitude, it receives precipitation all year, as snow in winter and as thunderstorms in summer, with a dry period in late spring.

== See also ==
- List of peaks in Rocky Mountain National Park
- Mountains of Larimer County, Colorado
- Mountains of Grand County, Colorado
- List of Colorado mountain ranges
- List of Colorado mountain summits
  - List of Colorado fourteeners
  - List of Colorado 4000 meter prominent summits
  - List of the most prominent summits of Colorado
- List of Colorado county high points

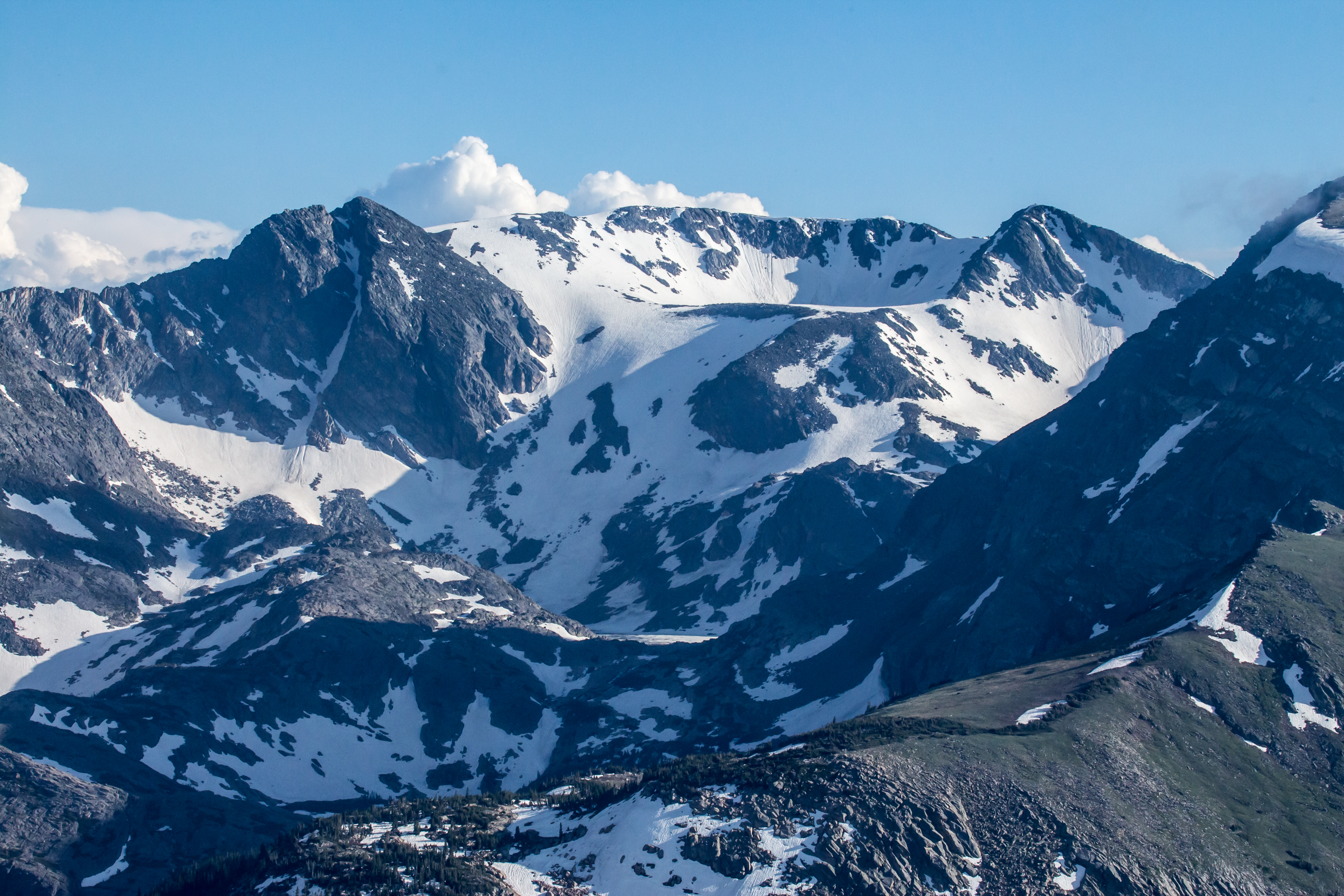
Cracktop (left) and Chief Cheley Peak (right)
