= St. Vrain Creek =

River in Colorado, United States

Saint Vrain Creek
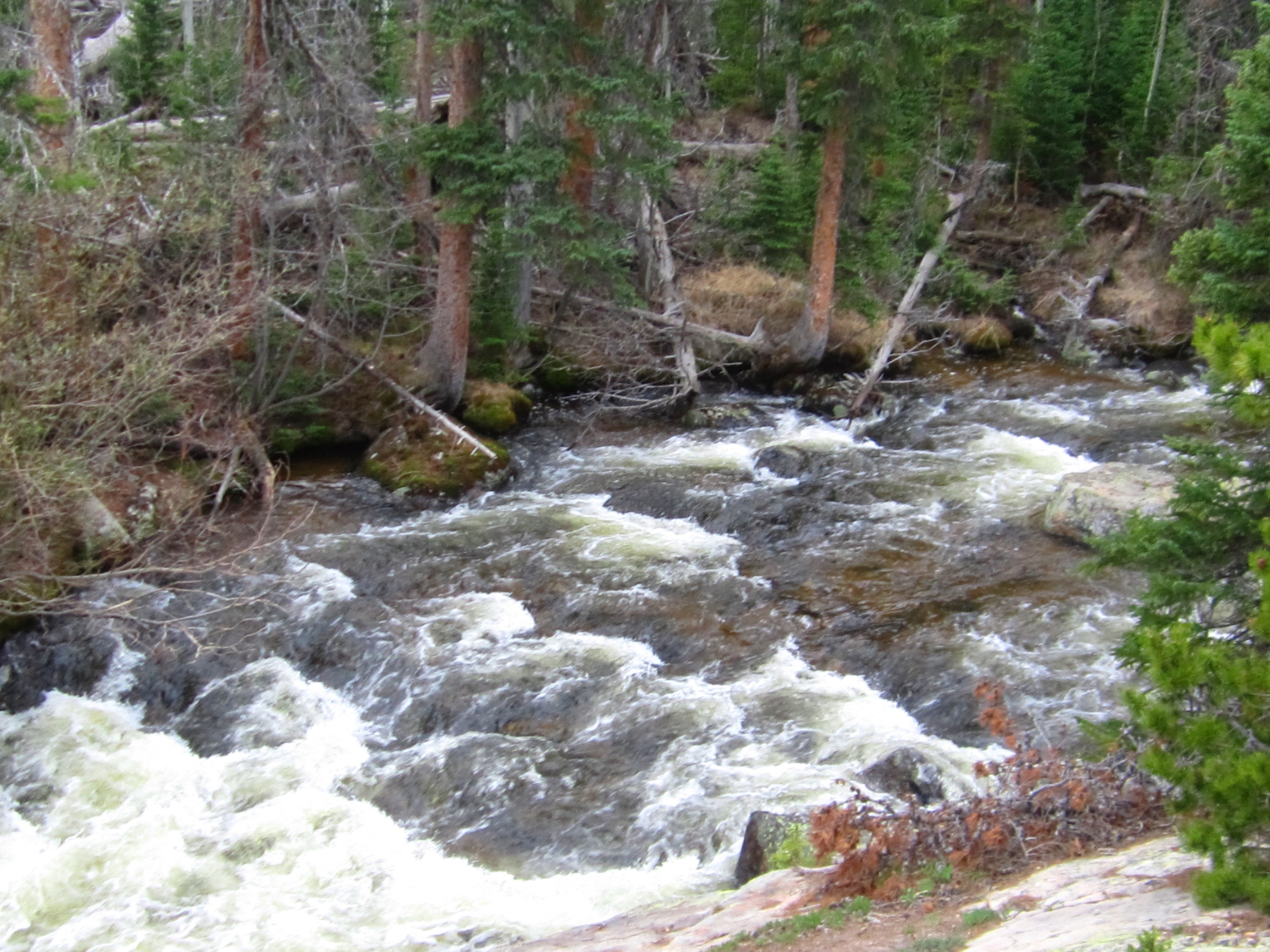
- St. Vrain Creek in Rocky Mountain National Park

- Location of mouth

Physical characteristics
- Source
  - location: Confluence of North St. Vrain and South St. Vrain
  - coordinates: 40°13′14″N 105°52′26″W
- Mouth
  - location: Confluence with South Platte
  - coordinates: 40°16′17″N 104°52′26″W
  - elevation: 4,737 ft (1,444 m)
- Basin size: 993 sq mi (2,570 km^{2})

Basin features
- Progression: South Platte—Platte— Missouri—Mississippi

St. Vrain Creek (often known locally as the St. Vrain River) is a tributary of the South Platte River, approximately 32.2 miles (51.8 km) long, in north central Colorado in the United States. It drains part of the foothills north of Boulder and the Colorado Piedmont area in the vicinity of Longmont.

The creek is formed by the confluence of North and South St. Vrain creeks at Lyons. The creek rises in several branches in the foothills of the Front Range northwest of Boulder.

Middle St. Vrain Creek rises along the continental divide, west of St. Vrain Mountain. It descends in canyon to flow along State Highway 7 and past Raymond. It joins the shorter South St. Vrain Creek about two miles below Raymond. Parts of the South St. Vrain Creek form a five-mile (8.0 km) Class 5+ kayak run during normal flows. North St. Vrain Creek rises northeast of St. Vrain Mountain near Mount Alice and Chiefs Head Peak, and descends in a remote canyon to the east along U.S. Highway 36. The two branches join at Lyons, at the mouth of the canyon. East of Lyons, the combined stream flows southeast through farmland and ranch country, passing south of Hygiene and entering Longmont. It passes through the south side of Longmont where it is rimmed by a greenway trail and several parks. East of Longmont it flows generally northeast, meandering through a wide river bottom in ranch country and passing under Interstate 25 south of the intersection with State Highway 66. It joins the South Platte from the west just upstream from the ruins of Fort St. Vrain and approximately four miles (6.4 km) northwest of Platteville.

St. Vrain Creek is joined by Left Hand Creek south of Longmont and Boulder Creek east of Longmont.

The stream was named after Ceran St. Vrain, a pioneer trader.

The St. Vrain features prominently in the essays of noted Lyons-based fly fishing author John Gierach.

== See also ==
- List of rivers of Colorado
