= Mount Ida (Colorado) =

Mountain in Colorado, United States

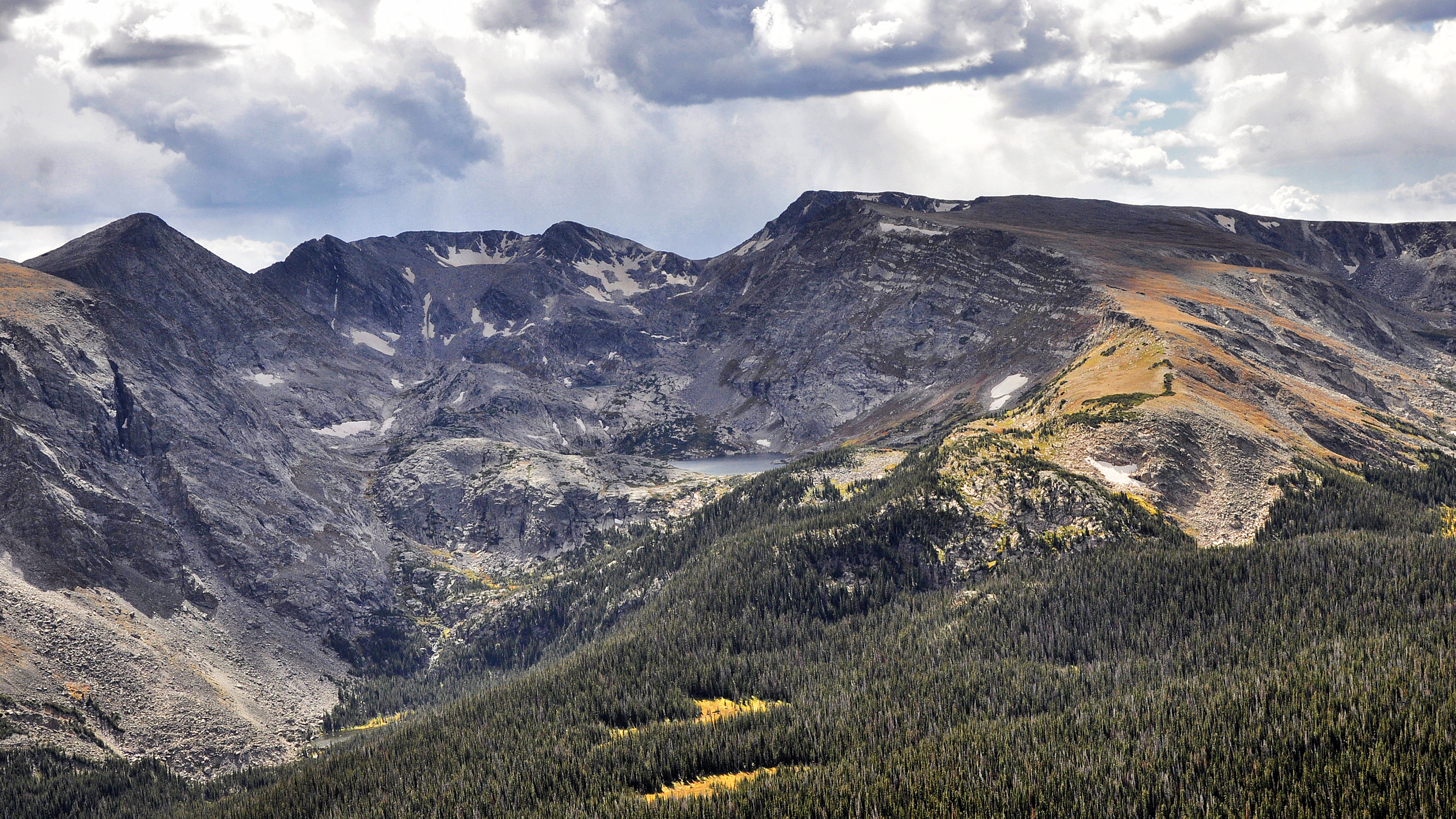
- Mount Ida and Azure Lake

Highest point
- Elevation: 12,874 ft (3,924 m)
- Prominence: 520 ft (158 m)
- Isolation: 1.16 mi (1.87 km)
- Coordinates: 40°22′18″N 105°46′45″W

Geography
- Location within Colorado
- Location: Grand and Larimer counties, Colorado, U.S.
- Parent range: Front Range
- Topo map(s): USGS 7.5' topographic map Grand Lake, Colorado

Mount Ida is a mountain summit in the northern Front Range of the Rocky Mountains of North America. The 12,874-foot (3,924 m) peak is located in the Rocky Mountain National Park Wilderness, 13.4 miles (21.6 km) west (bearing 268°) of the Town of Estes Park, Colorado, United States, on the Continental Divide between Grand and Larimer counties. The mountain was probably named after Mount Ida on Crete.

== Climate ==
According to the Köppen climate classification system, the mountain is located in an alpine subarctic climate zone with cold, snowy winters, and cool to warm summers. Due to its altitude, it receives precipitation all year, as snow in winter and as thunderstorms in summer, with a dry period in late spring.

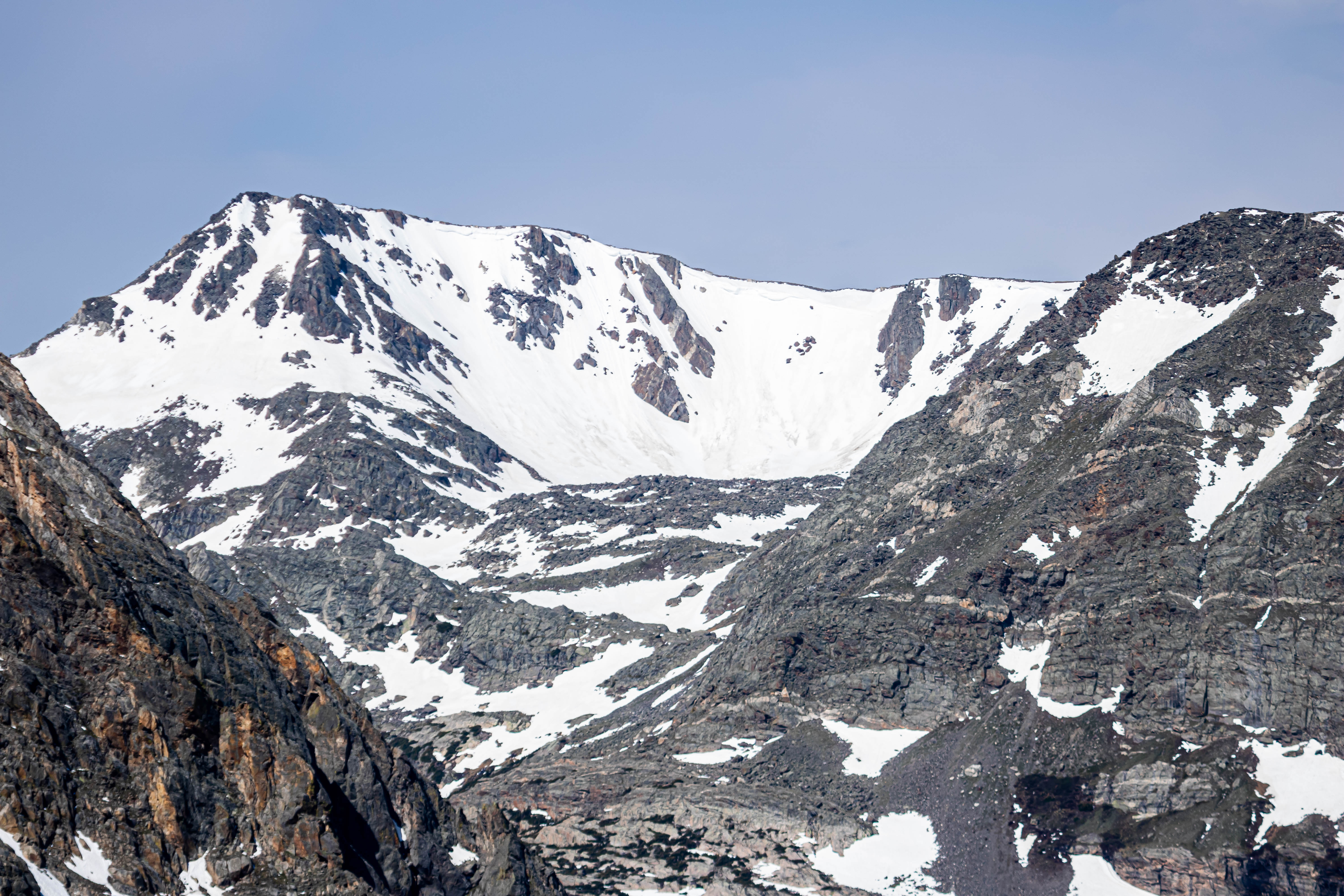
East aspect of Mount Ida

== See also ==
- List of peaks in Rocky Mountain National Park
- List of Colorado mountain summits
