= Grand Lake, Colorado =

Town in Colorado, United States

- Statutory Town
- Town of Grand Lake
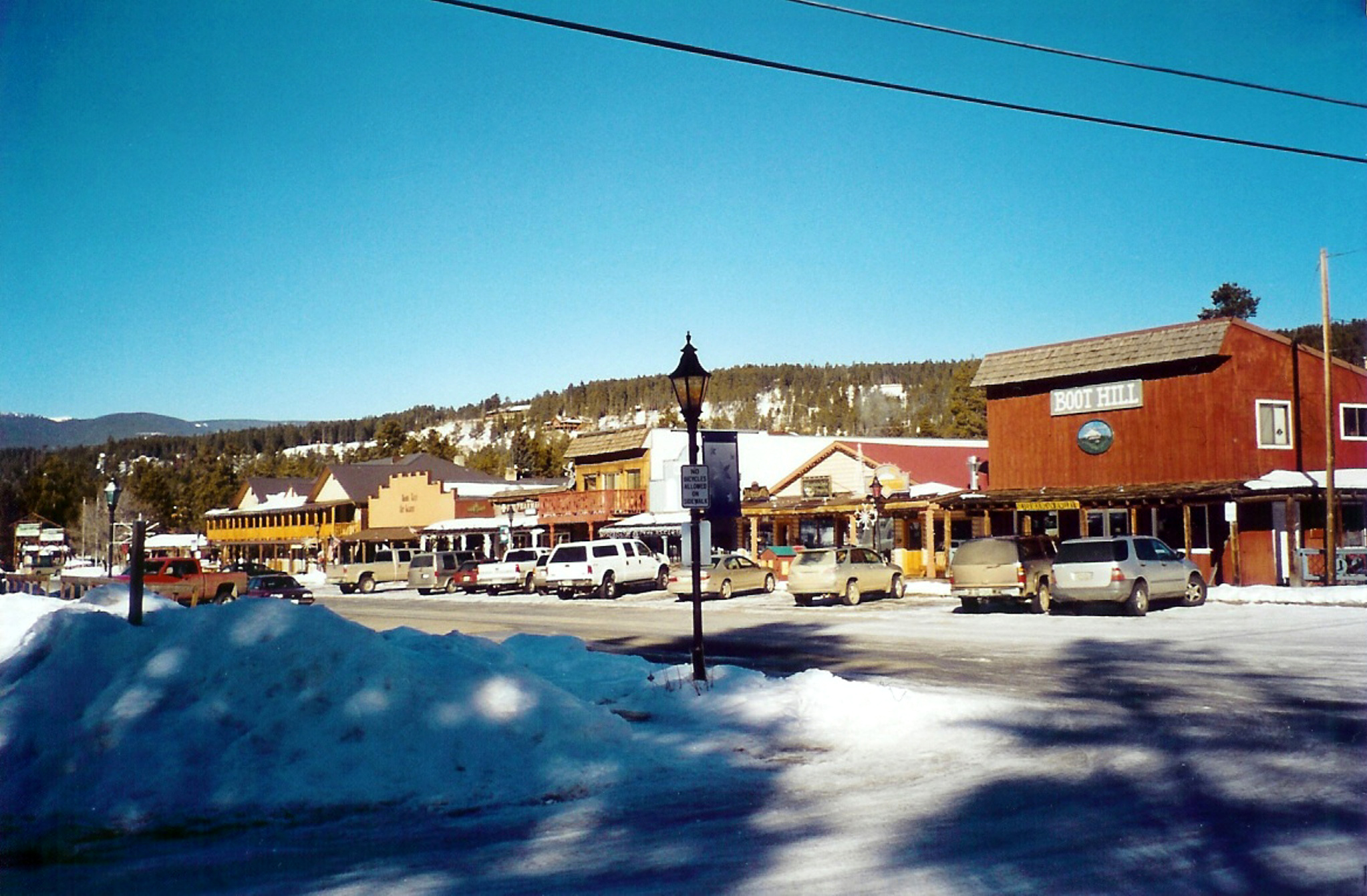
- Grand Lake village in winter

- Location of the Town of Grand Lake in Grand County, Colorado
- Coordinates: 40°15′02″N 105°49′28″W
- Country: United States
- State: Colorado
- County: Grand County
- Established: 1879
- Incorporated (town): June 23, 1944

Government
  - Type: Statutory Town

Area
  - Total: 1.034 sq mi (2.679 km^{2})
  - Land: 1.032 sq mi (2.672 km^{2})
  - Water: 0.0027 sq mi (0.007 km^{2})
- Elevation: 8,439 ft (2,572 m)

Population (2020)
  - Total: 410
  - Density: 400/sq mi (150/km^{2})
- Time zone: UTC−07:00 (MST)
  - Summer (DST): UTC−06:00 (MDT)
- ZIP code: 80447
- Area code: 970
- FIPS code: 08-31715
- GNIS feature ID: 2412701
- Website: www.townofgrandlake.com

The Town of Grand Lake is a statutory town located in Grand County, Colorado, United States. The town population was 410 at the 2020 United States census.

== History ==
Established in 1881, Grand Lake sits at an elevation of 8,369 feet (2,551 m) and derives its name from the lake on whose shores it is situated: Grand Lake, the largest natural body of water in Colorado. The town of Grand Lake was originally an outfitting and supply point for the mining settlements of Lulu City, Teller City, and Gaskill, but today is a tourist destination adjacent to the western entrance to Rocky Mountain National Park, which surrounds the lake and the town on three sides. Grand Lake was the Grand County seat of government from 1882 to 1888. It was incorporated on June 23, 1944.

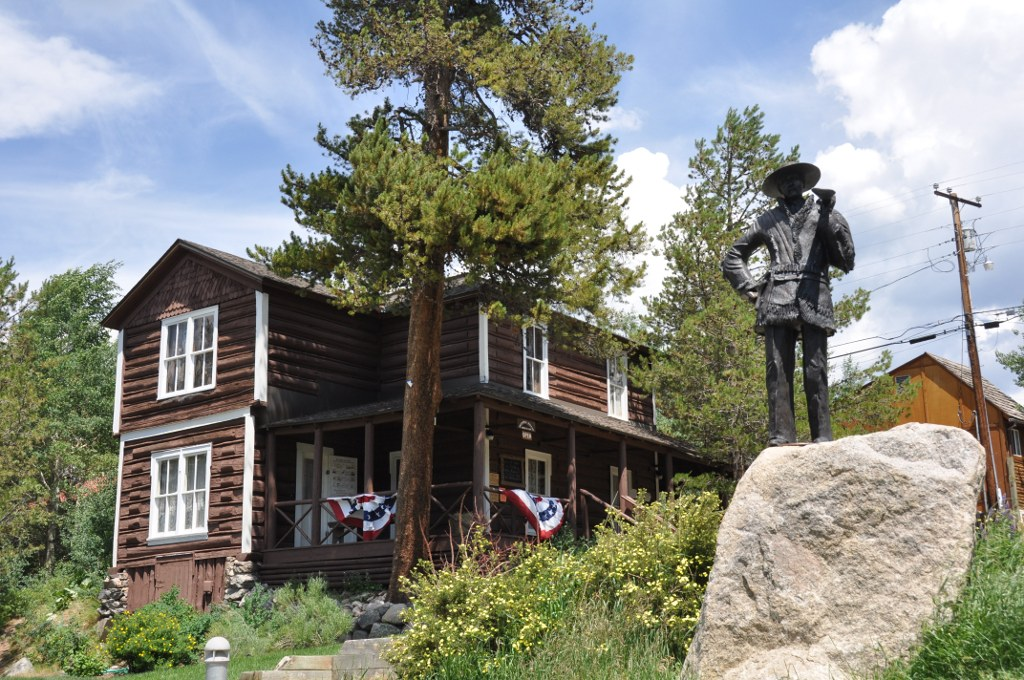
The Kauffman House

The Kauffman House is an NRHP-listed rustic log house that functioned as a hotel from its construction in 1892 until 1946. The Grand Lake Area Historical Society purchased the house in 1973 and converted it into a museum as the only pre-20th century log hotel remaining in Grand Lake.

=== Fred N. Selak, ″The Hermit of Grand Lake″ ===
Frederick Nicholas Selak (1865–1926) was an early pioneer of the Grand Lake area. He operated a stage line with his brother as well as saloons and other businesses in the early days of Grand Lake. When he died he owned 300 acres of land in and around Grand Lake as well as interest in two mining operations.

In 1926 Selak lived alone in a small log cabin about 3 miles outside of Grand Lake. He was referred to as "The Hermit of Grand Lake", but was known to have loaned money to locals, and rumored to have stashed up to $500,000 on his property. After friends became concerned they had not seen Selak for over a week, they checked on him, found his house had been ransacked, floorboards torn up, and Selak nowhere to be found. An investigation by the local Sheriff was unable to identify any leads. The intrigue surrounding the hermit and his wealth made the crime mystery a national story. An article in True Detective Mysteries magazine described the crime in the June 1930 issue. The article had the title Echo Mountain′s Hanging Spectre and was written by A. G. Gertz of The Denver Post.

Selak's sister in California, Lillian Coffee, and her husband, Lawrence W. Coffee, were notified when Selak went missing. The two traveled to Colorado to assist in locating her brother. Lawrence Coffee was credited for helping identify the two suspects that would later confess to Selak's murder.

The two men had hanged Selak July 21 as retaliation related to a fencing dispute. When found on August 17, Selak's remains were still hanging from the pine tree where he was killed almost a month earlier. Selak's murderers said they only found $75 and some old coins when they searched Selak's property. It was the coins that alerted Coffee as to who the perpetrators might be. Rumors of the hidden cash persisted. In March 1927, convinced there must be more valuables or cash stashed somewhere on the property, the townspeople planned a search of his property as soon as the snow cleared.

The two perpetrators, Arthur Osborn, 22 at the time of the murder, and his cousin, Ray Noakes, 21, were found guilty of first degree murder and sentenced to death. Like the man they killed, they themselves were hanged. They were executed in Cañon City, Colorado, on March 30, 1928.

On October 14, 2020, the East Troublesome Fire ignited north of Parshall. The wildfire rapidly spread eastward toward Grand Lake and into Rocky Mountain National Park. As many as 794 firefighters fought the wildfire as it consumed 193,812 acres (784 km^{2}) of forest and rangeland to become the second most extensive Colorado wildfire in recorded history. Thousands were evacuated, more than 300 homes were destroyed, and two residents were killed. The wildfire became the most expensive in Colorado history with insured losses alone of $543 million.

== Geography ==
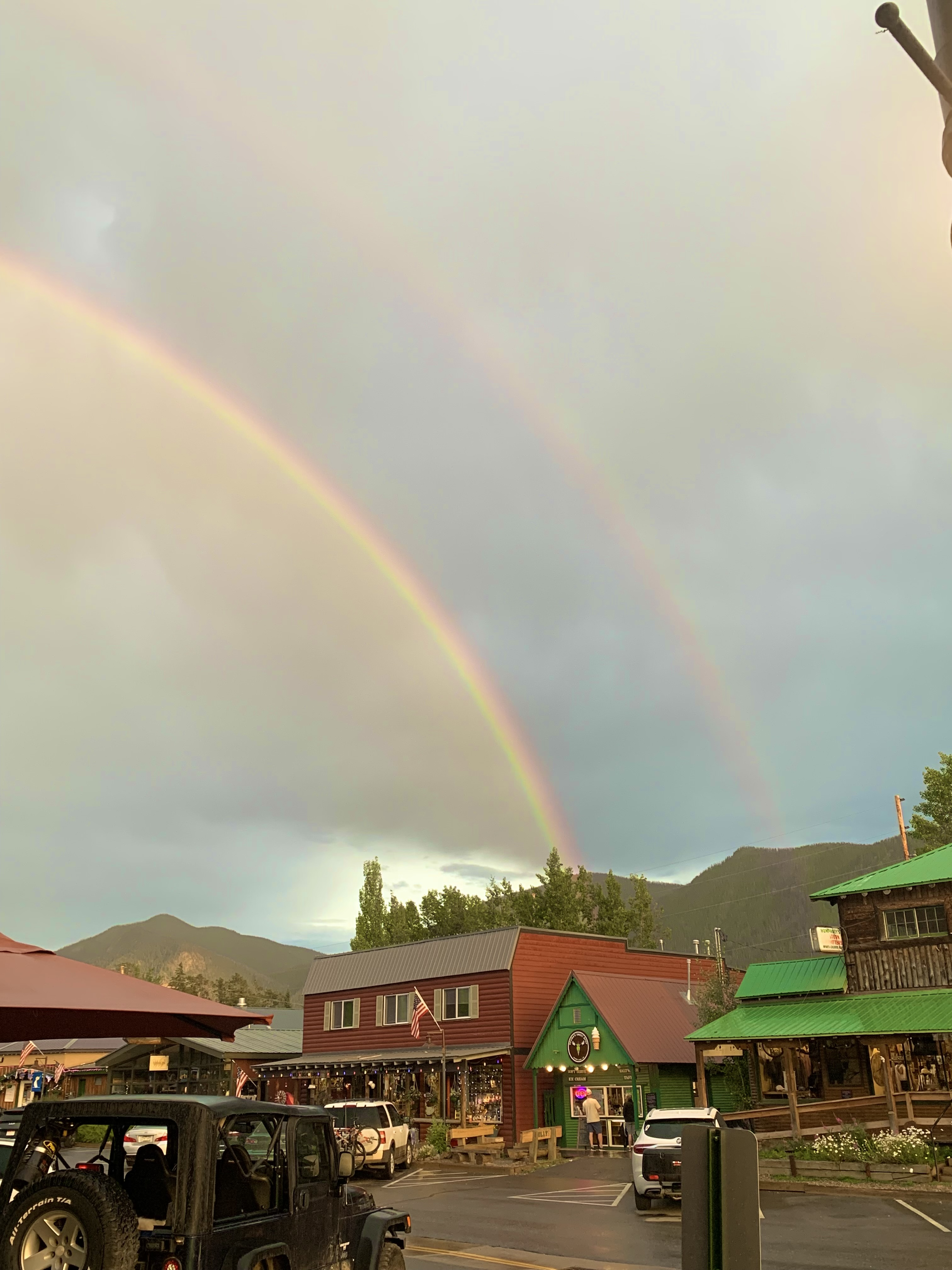
A double rainbow over the town.

Grand Lake is located in northeastern Grand County. U.S. Route 34 (Trail Ridge Road) runs through the western side of the town, entering Rocky Mountain National Park just north of town and leading 45 miles (72 km) across the mountains to Estes Park. To the southwest, US 34 leads 15 miles (24 km) to Granby.

At the 2020 United States census, the town had a total area of 662 acres (2.679 km^{2}) including 1.7 acres (0.007 km^{2}) of water.

=== Climate ===
Due to its elevation, Grand Lake has a subalpine climate (Köppen climate classification Dfc) with a short growing season, averaging just 49 days per year. Temperatures are chilly at night even through the summer months, and only three months have an average temperature of above 10 °C (50 °F).

Climate data for Grand Lake, Colorado, 1991–2020 normals, extremes 1939–present
Month	Jan	Feb	Mar	Apr	May	Jun	Jul	Aug	Sep	Oct	Nov	Dec	Year
Record high °F (°C)	53 (12)	56 (13)	67 (19)	73 (23)	82 (28)	89 (32)	92 (33)	92 (33)	89 (32)	80 (27)	68 (20)	55 (13)	92 (33)
Mean maximum °F (°C)	45.5 (7.5)	48.6 (9.2)	56.6 (13.7)	64.4 (18.0)	73.9 (23.3)	81.7 (27.6)	85.8 (29.9)	82.8 (28.2)	78.9 (26.1)	70.5 (21.4)	56.8 (13.8)	45.6 (7.6)	86.5 (30.3)
Mean daily maximum °F (°C)	30.2 (−1.0)	34.3 (1.3)	42.2 (5.7)	49.1 (9.5)	59.2 (15.1)	70.5 (21.4)	75.9 (24.4)	73.3 (22.9)	67.6 (19.8)	54.9 (12.7)	40.1 (4.5)	30.0 (−1.1)	52.3 (11.3)
Daily mean °F (°C)	17.4 (−8.1)	20.3 (−6.5)	28.0 (−2.2)	34.8 (1.6)	43.4 (6.3)	52.3 (11.3)	57.8 (14.3)	55.8 (13.2)	49.7 (9.8)	39.0 (3.9)	26.7 (−2.9)	17.5 (−8.1)	36.9 (2.7)
Mean daily minimum °F (°C)	4.5 (−15.3)	6.4 (−14.2)	13.7 (−10.2)	20.5 (−6.4)	27.7 (−2.4)	34.2 (1.2)	39.8 (4.3)	38.4 (3.6)	31.8 (−0.1)	23.1 (−4.9)	13.2 (−10.4)	5.1 (−14.9)	21.5 (−5.8)
Mean minimum °F (°C)	−16.6 (−27.0)	−14.5 (−25.8)	−7.3 (−21.8)	4.7 (−15.2)	16.5 (−8.6)	26.3 (−3.2)	33.0 (0.6)	31.4 (−0.3)	21.9 (−5.6)	8.6 (−13.0)	−7.7 (−22.1)	−15.6 (−26.4)	−21.0 (−29.4)
Record low °F (°C)	−46 (−43)	−42 (−41)	−36 (−38)	−21 (−29)	−1 (−18)	16 (−9)	21 (−6)	18 (−8)	7 (−14)	−24 (−31)	−28 (−33)	−35 (−37)	−46 (−43)
Average precipitation inches (mm)	1.65 (42)	1.50 (38)	1.23 (31)	1.55 (39)	1.59 (40)	1.36 (35)	1.98 (50)	2.09 (53)	1.59 (40)	1.27 (32)	1.29 (33)	1.50 (38)	18.60 (472)
Average snowfall inches (cm)	30.6 (78)	25.1 (64)	17.6 (45)	17.1 (43)	5.3 (13)	0.4 (1.0)	0.0 (0.0)	0.0 (0.0)	0.4 (1.0)	7.4 (19)	22.5 (57)	28.5 (72)	154.9 (393)
Average extreme snow depth inches (cm)	25.6 (65)	30.5 (77)	30.1 (76)	19.2 (49)	3.7 (9.4)	0.2 (0.51)	0.0 (0.0)	0.0 (0.0)	0.1 (0.25)	4.4 (11)	9.3 (24)	17.5 (44)	33.3 (85)
Average precipitation days (≥ 0.01 in)	14.8	13.2	11.6	11.1	12.3	10.5	13.6	15.3	11.9	9.5	10.9	13.8	148.5
Average snowy days (≥ 0.1 in)	14.5	12.1	8.7	6.6	1.8	0.2	0.0	0.0	0.4	3.3	9.4	13.5	70.5
Source 1: NOAA
Source 2: National Weather Service

== Grand Lake ==
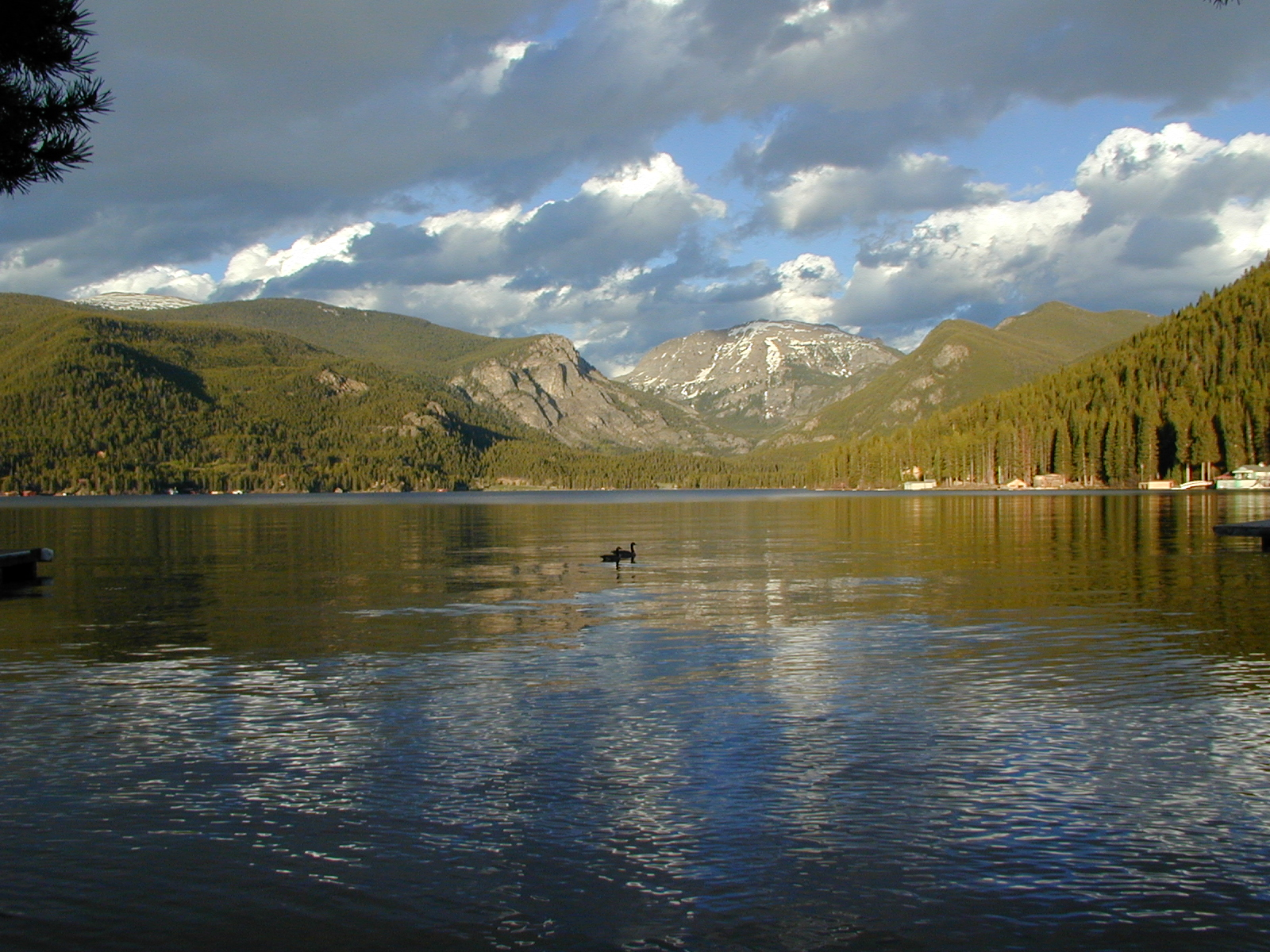
Grand Lake and Mt. Craig

Grand Lake is Colorado's largest and deepest natural lake, and is part of the headwaters of the Colorado River. The lake became a component in the Colorado-Big Thompson Project (C-BT) in 1937, when it was recruited as a conduit for C-BT project water. The C-BT project diverts water from the Colorado River Basin east via the Alva B. Adams Tunnel under the Continental Divide and Rocky Mountain National Park to the Big Thompson River watershed, thence the South Platte River and ultimately the Mississippi River basin.

Grand Lake Yacht Club is a private club that hosts sailing races on the lake, and there are also publicly and privately operated marinas, a public boat ramp, and public boat docks on the lake.

== Demographics ==
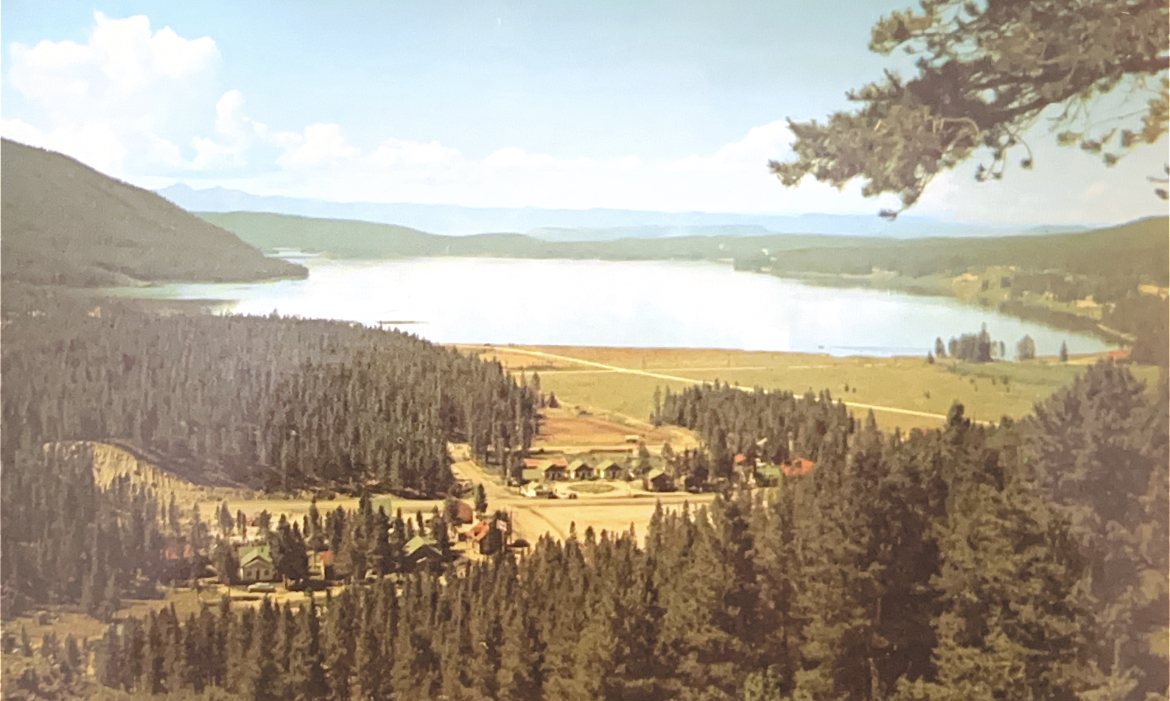
Grand Lake Post Card circa 1940s

Historical population
Census	Pop.	Note	%±
1950	309		—
1960	170		−45.0%
1970	189		11.2%
1980	382		102.1%
1990	259		−32.2%
2000	447		72.6%
2010	471		5.4%
2020	410		−13.0%
U.S. Decennial Census

== Culture ==
The image to the right features a vintage post card of Grand Lake in its early days as a tourist attraction. The description reads: "Shadow Mt. Lake and Granby reservoir are a vast new development for fishing, cabins and water sports."

=== Rocky Mountain Repertory Theatre ===
Grand Lake is home to the Rocky Mountain Repertory Theatre. This summer stock theatre company produces various theatrical productions throughout the year, usually three Broadway musicals from June through August and one musical in September. In the spring of 2010, a new 12,000-square-foot (1,100 m^{2}) theatre complex was built for the Rocky Mountain Repertory Theatre in Grand Lake.

=== Grand Lake boardwalk ===
The Grand Lake citizens call a block of boutiques and shops the boardwalk. The boardwalk is all small owned and operated and has no chain restaurants or shops. At the boardwalk you can find anything from coffee shops and restaurants to tourist shops, boutiques, and homemade jewelry.

== Notable residents ==
- Tim Allen
- Marv Heemeyer
- Fred Selak

== See also ==
- Arapaho National Recreation Area
- Grand River
