= Chiefs Head Peak =

Mountain summit in Boulder County, Colorado, United States

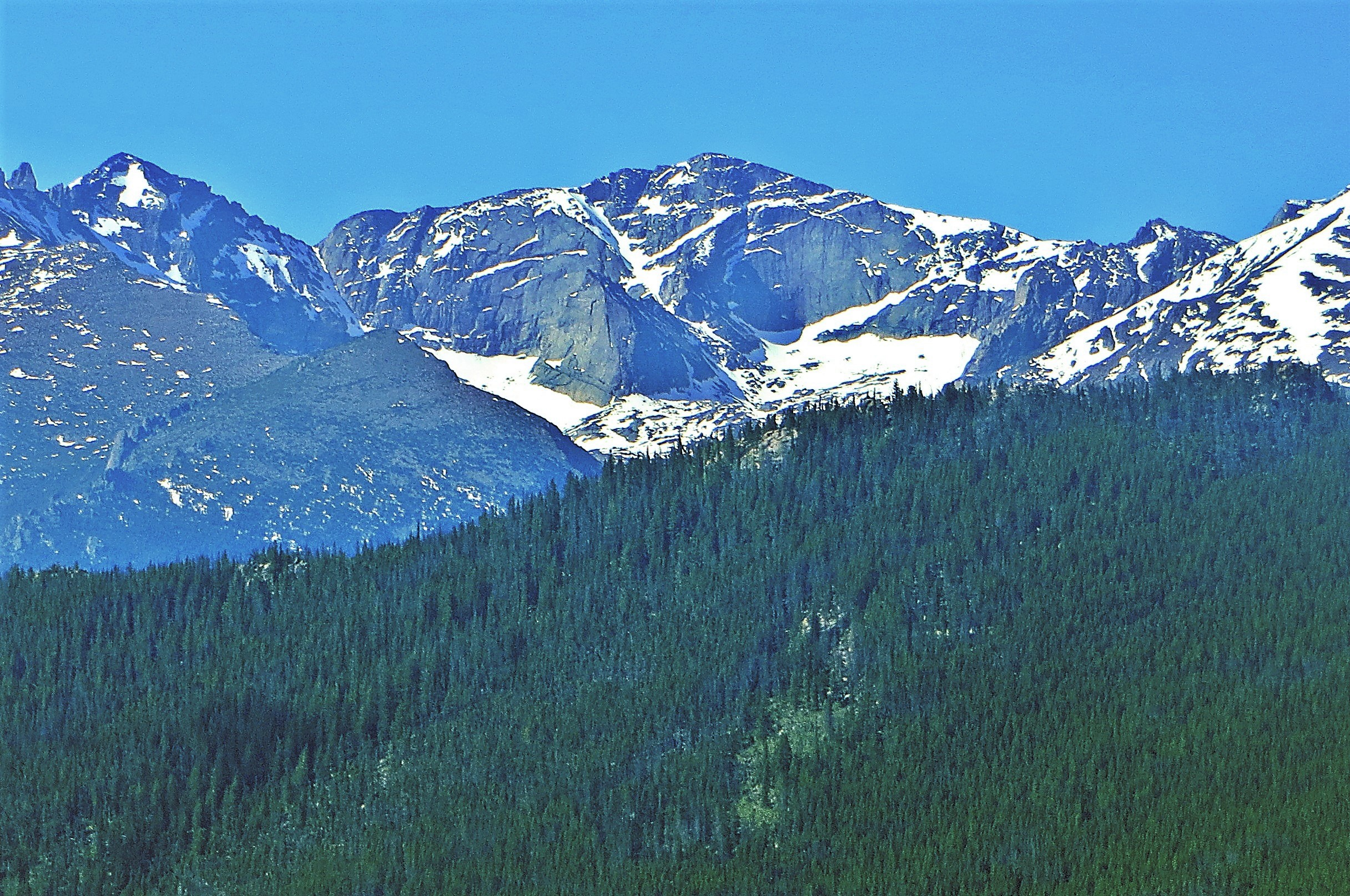
- North aspect

Highest point
- Elevation: 13,577 ft (4,138 m)
- Prominence: 696 ft (212 m)
- Parent peak: Longs Peak (14,259 ft)
- Isolation: 1.45 mi (2.33 km)
- Coordinates: 40°14′57″N 105°38′28″W

Geography
- Location within Colorado Location within the United States
- Country: United States
- State: Colorado
- County: Boulder County
- Protected area: Rocky Mountain National Park
- Parent range: Rocky Mountains; Front Range
- Topo map: USGS Isolation Peak

Geology
- Rock age: Precambrian
- Rock type: Granite of Longs Peak batholith

Climbing
- Easiest route: class 2+

Chiefs Head Peak (Arapaho: Hookuhu'eeno) is a 13,577-foot-elevation (4,138-meter) mountain summit in Boulder County, Colorado, United States.

== Description ==
Chiefs Head Peak is set along the Continental Divide in the Front Range of the Rocky Mountains. The mountain is situated within Rocky Mountain National Park and is the third-highest peak in the park. It is also the third-highest peak in Boulder County. Precipitation runoff from the mountain's south slope drains into North St. Vrain Creek, the north slope drains to Glacier Creek which is a tributary of the Big Thompson River, and the lower west slope drains to Grand Lake via North Inlet. Topographic relief is significant as the summit rises 2,000 feet (610 meters) above Frozen Lake in one-half mile. The mountain's toponym was officially adopted in 1911 by the United States Board on Geographic Names. The Arapaho called this peak hookuhu'eeno or "Head Mountain" because of a profile resemblance to a chief wearing a war bonnet.

== Climate ==
According to the Köppen climate classification system, Chiefs Head Peak is located in an alpine subarctic climate zone with cold, snowy winters, and cool to warm summers. Due to its altitude, it receives precipitation all year, as snow in winter, and as thunderstorms in summer, with a dry period in late spring.

== See also ==
- List of peaks in Rocky Mountain National Park
- Mountains of Boulder County, Colorado
- Thirteener

== Gallery ==
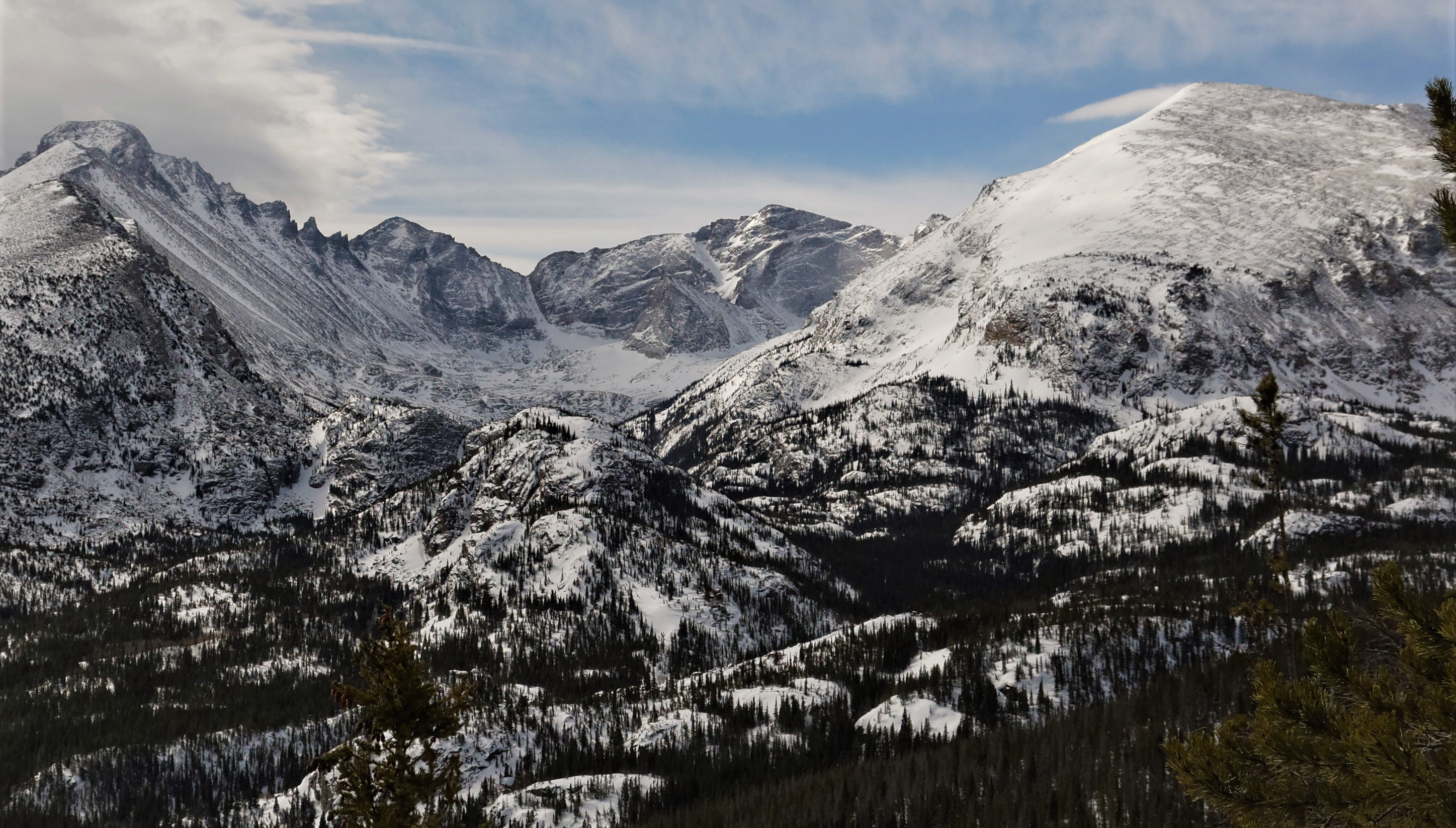
Longs Peak (left), Chiefs Head Peak (center), Thatchtop (right) from north

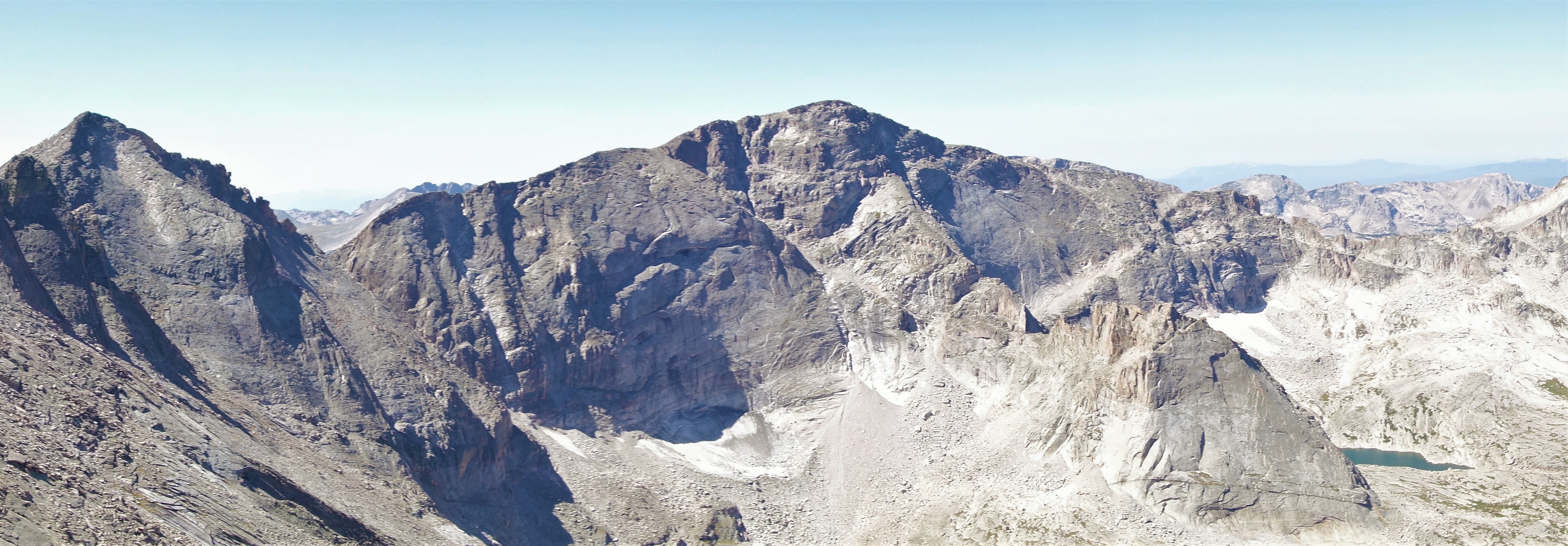
Northeast aspect of Chiefs Head seen from The Keyhole on Longs Peak. Pagoda Mountain to left. The Spearhead in lower right.

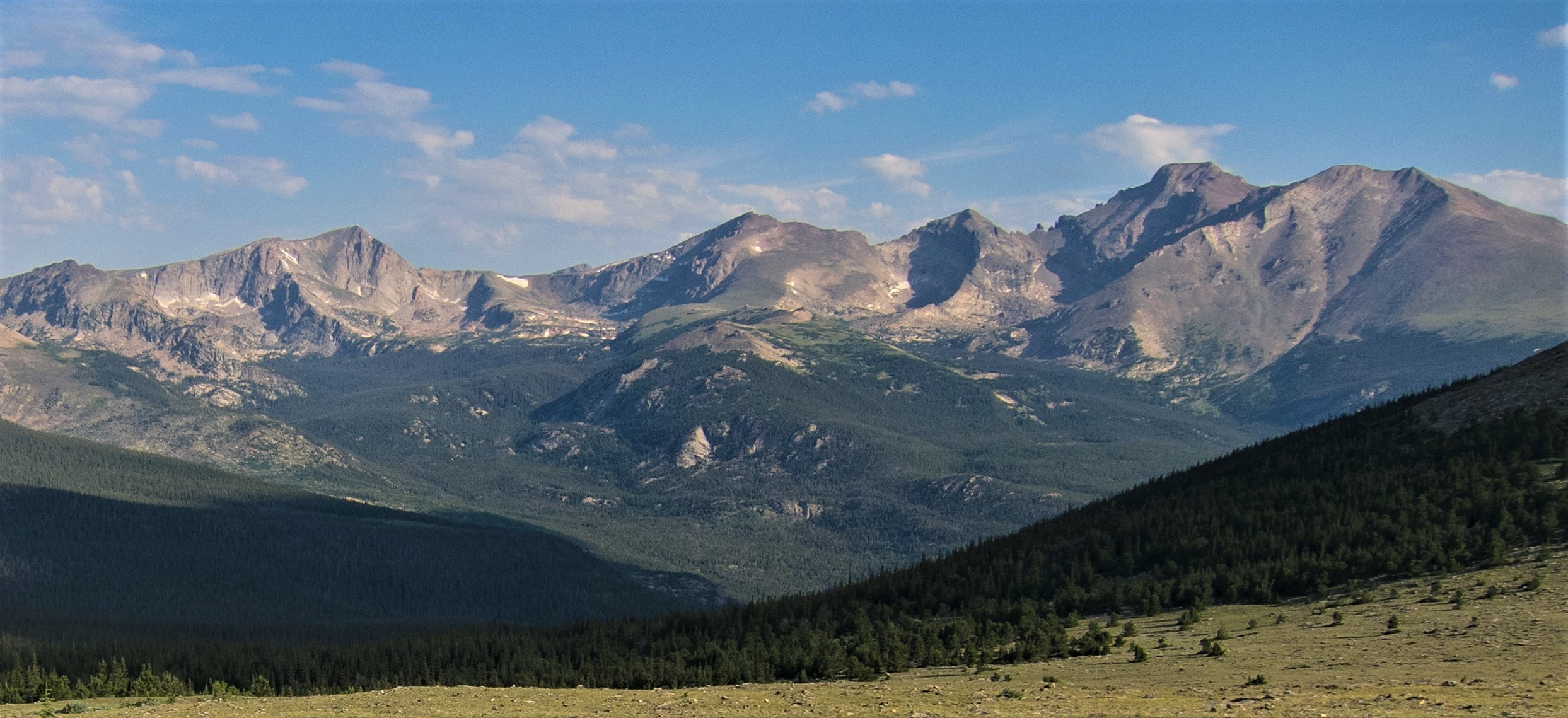
Left to right: Mount Alice, Chiefs Head Peak (centered), Pagoda Mountain, Longs Peak, Mount Meeker. Southeast aspect viewed across Wild Basin.

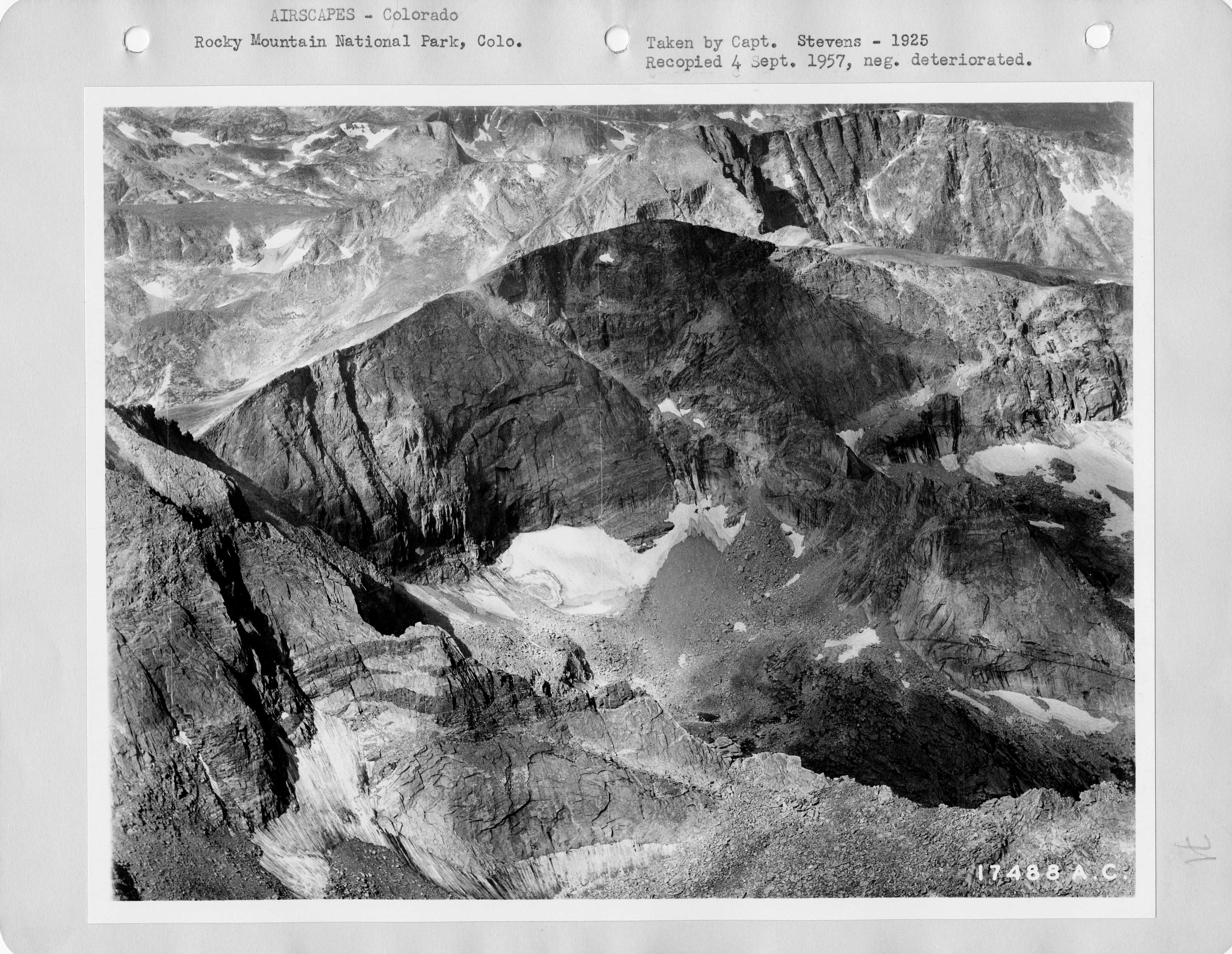
Aerial view of Chiefs Head, circa 1925

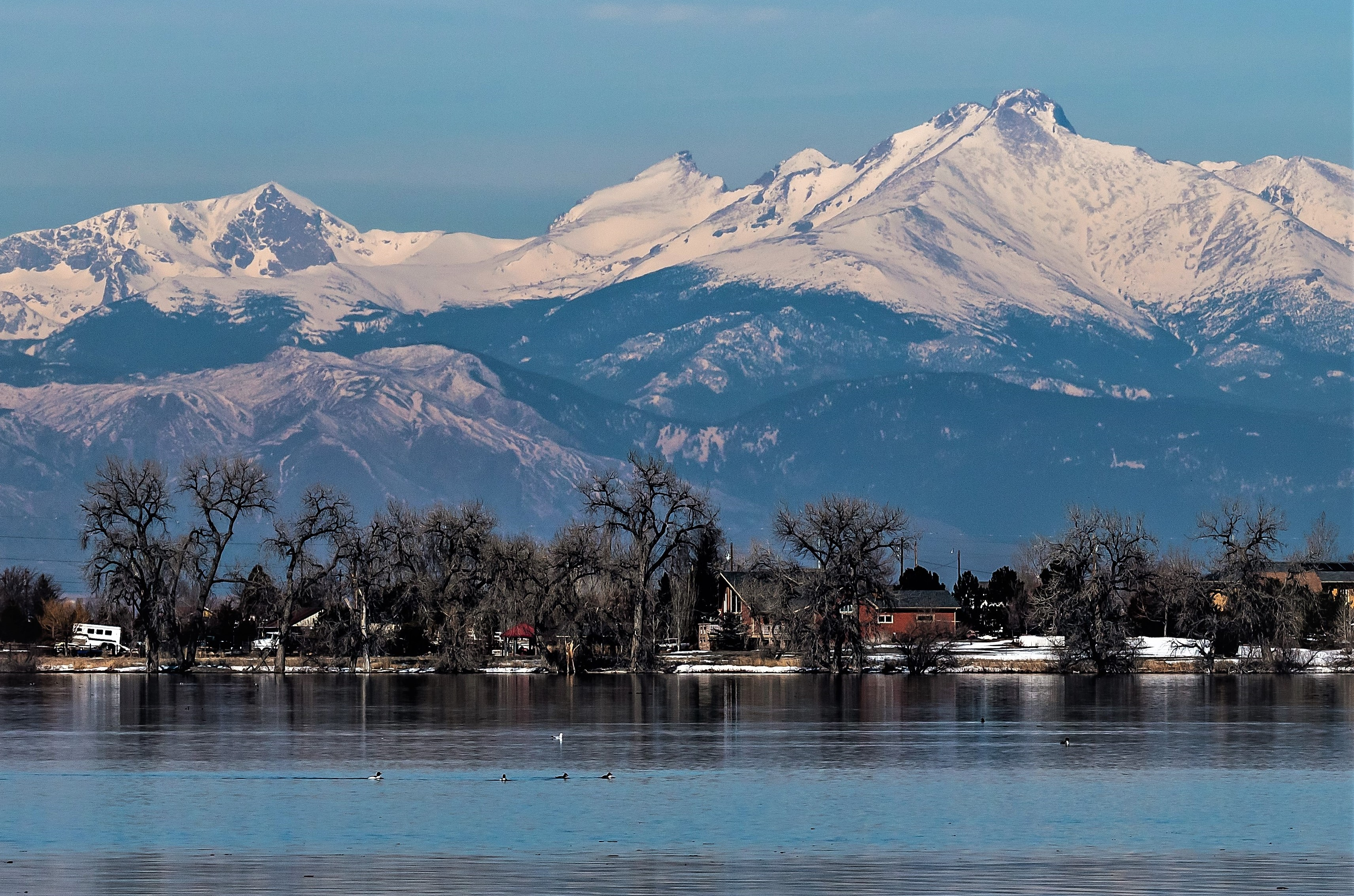
Chiefs Head Peak centered on skyline with Mt. Alice to left and Longs Peak to right. View from Barr Lake in the Denver area.
