= Wild Basin, Rocky Mountain National Park =

Coordinates: 40°12′05″N 105°36′43″W

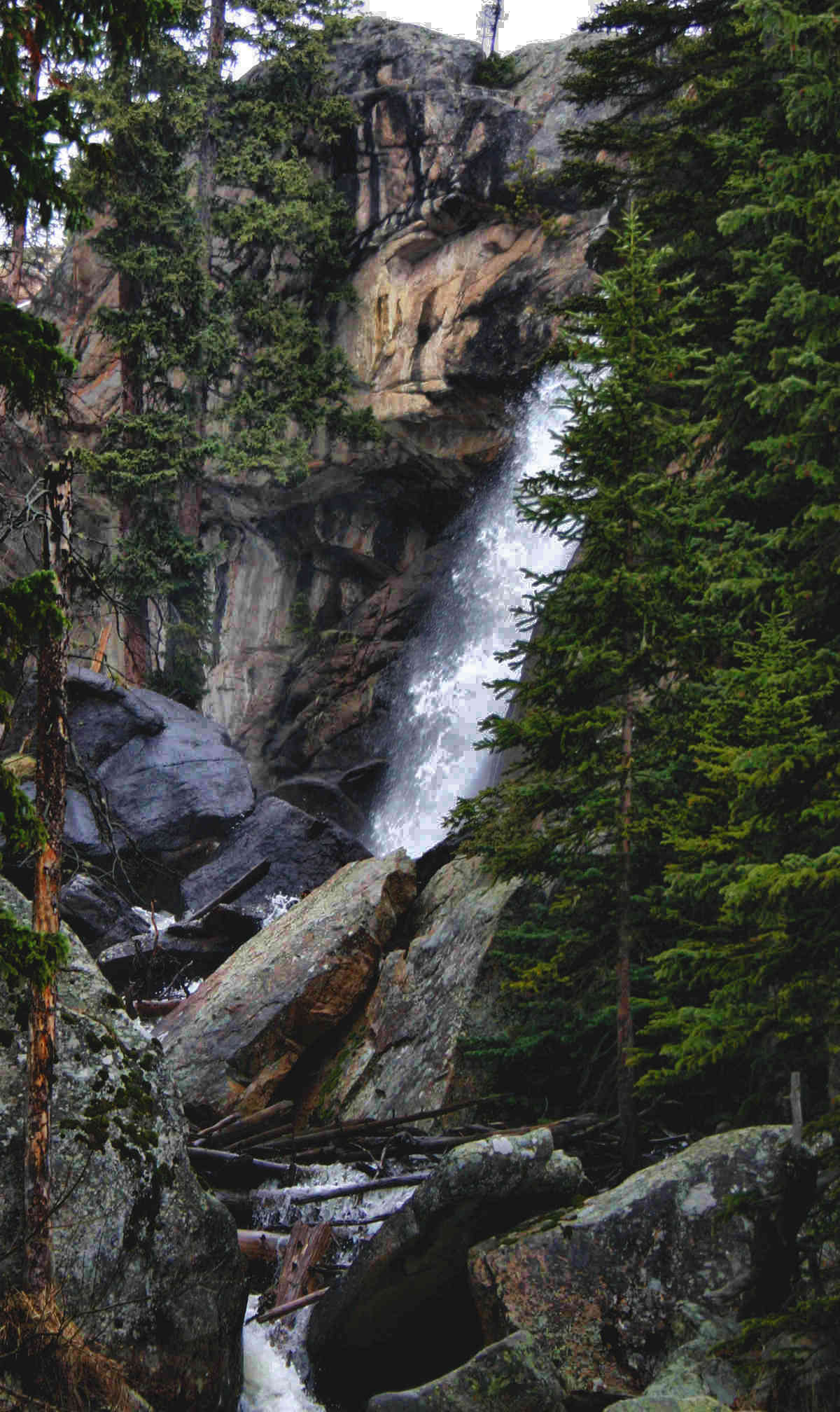
View of Ouzel Falls

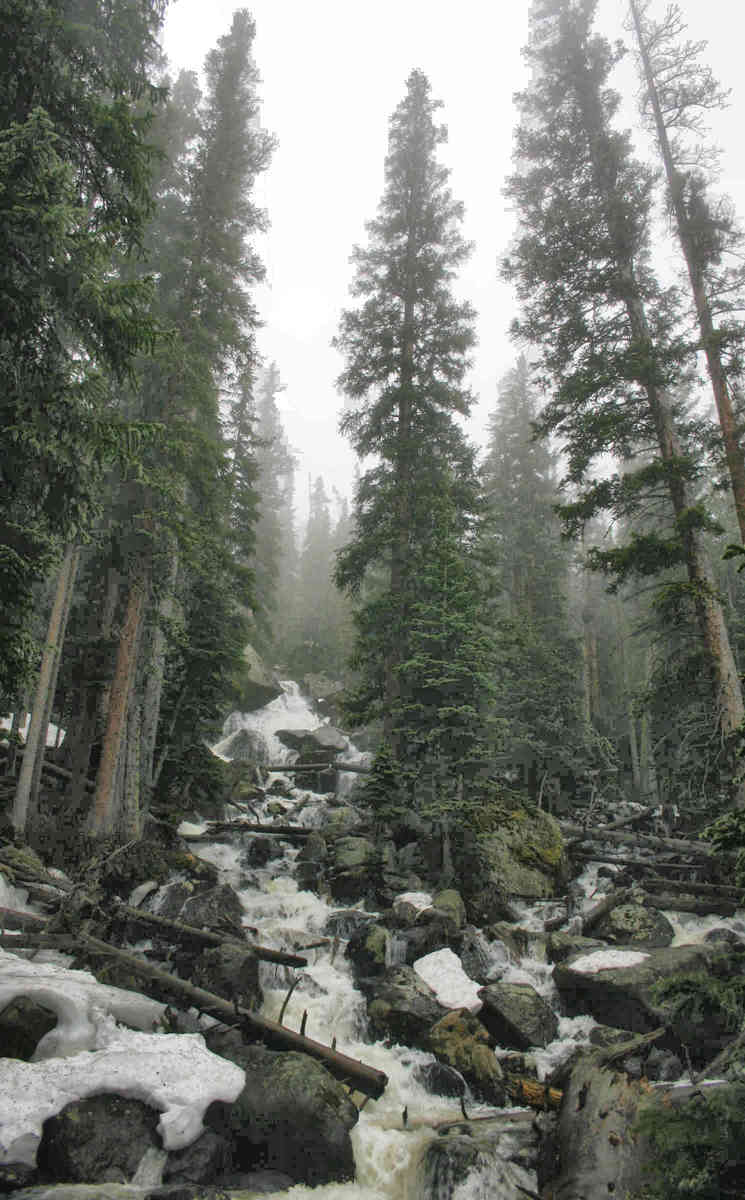
View of Calypso Cascades

Wild Basin a region in the southeast corner Rocky Mountain National Park in Colorado, United States. The primary entrance is located north of Allenspark off State Highway 7.

A dirt road leads to a ranger station, parking and horseback or hiking trails. The trail to Bluebird Lake and Ouzel Lake follows the North St. Vrain Creek (which is a tributary of the South Platte River) passing Calypso Cascades and Ouzel Falls along the way, leading to Ouzel Lake and Bluebird Lake. Both Ouzel Falls and Ouzel Lake are named after a North American species of bird, Cinclus mexicanus, also known as a dipper. Other trails lead to Thunder Lake, Finch Lake, and Pear Lake.

== See also ==
- Alpine Visitor Center
