= Mount Craig (Colorado) =

Mountain in the state of Colorado

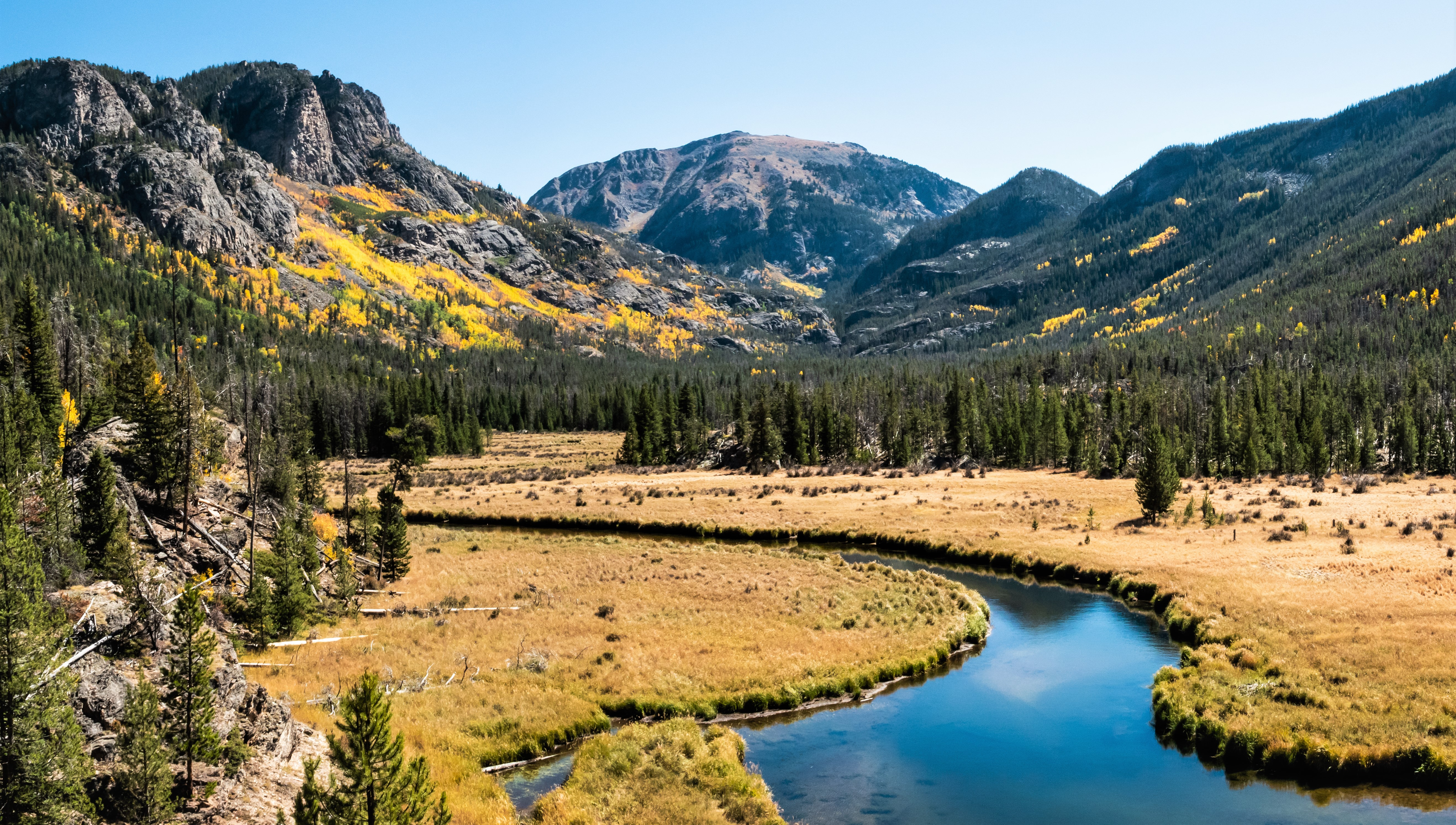
- West aspect of Mt. Craig, center (East Inlet, foreground)

Highest point
- Elevation: 12,007 ft (3,660 m)
- Prominence: 388 ft (118 m)
- Parent peak: Fleur De Lis (12,253 ft)
- Isolation: 1.21 mi (1.95 km)
- Coordinates: 40°13′09″N 105°43′42″W

Naming
- Etymology: Rev. William Bayard Craig

Geography
- Location within Colorado Location within the United States
- Country: United States
- State: Colorado
- County: Grand
- Protected area: Rocky Mountain National Park
- Parent range: Rocky Mountains; Front Range
- Topo map: USGS Isolation Peak

Geology
- Rock age: Precambrian
- Rock type(s): Granite of Longs Peak batholith Biotite schist and gneiss

Climbing
- Easiest route: class 2 hiking

Mount Craig is a 12,007-foot-elevation (3,660-meter) mountain summit in Grand County, Colorado, United States.

== Description ==
Mount Craig is set 3.5 miles (5.6 km) west of the Continental Divide in the Front Range of the Rocky Mountains. The mountain is situated within Rocky Mountain National Park and six miles (9.7 km) east of the town of Grand Lake, Colorado. Precipitation runoff from the mountain's slopes drains to Grand Lake via East Inlet. Topographic relief is significant as the summit rises 2,800 feet (850 meters) above East Inlet in one mile (1.6 km).

== Etymology ==
The mountain is named after Reverend William Bayard Craig (1848–1916), the same person that the town of Craig, Colorado, is named for. Rev. Craig owned lakeshore property at Grand Lake during the 1880s. The mountain's toponym was officially adopted in 1932 by the United States Board on Geographic Names.

== Climate ==
According to the Köppen climate classification system, Mount Craig is located in an alpine subarctic climate zone with cold, snowy winters, and cool to warm summers. Due to its altitude, it receives precipitation all year, as snow in winter and as thunderstorms in summer, with a dry period in late spring.

== Gallery ==
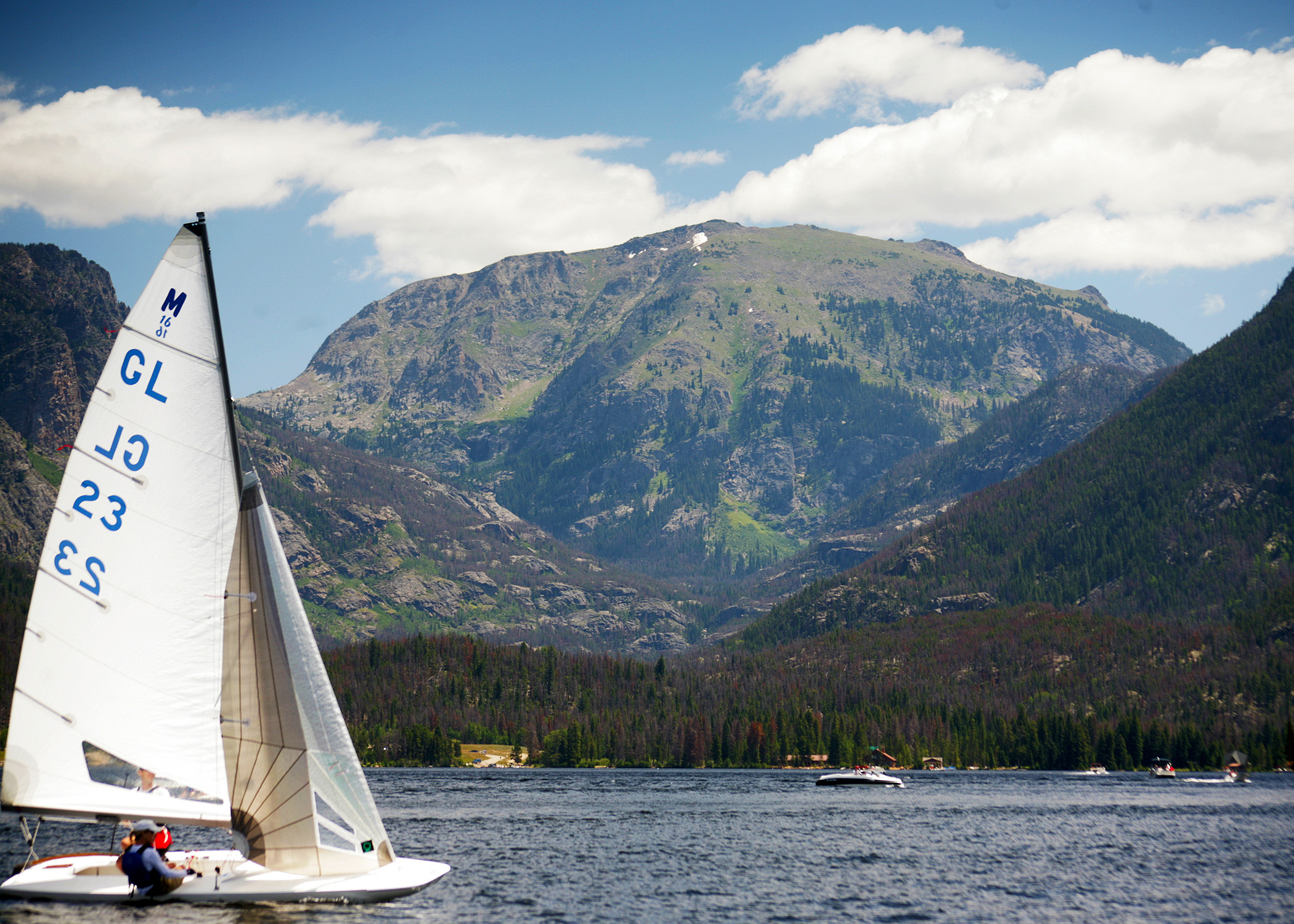
Mount Craig from Grand Lake

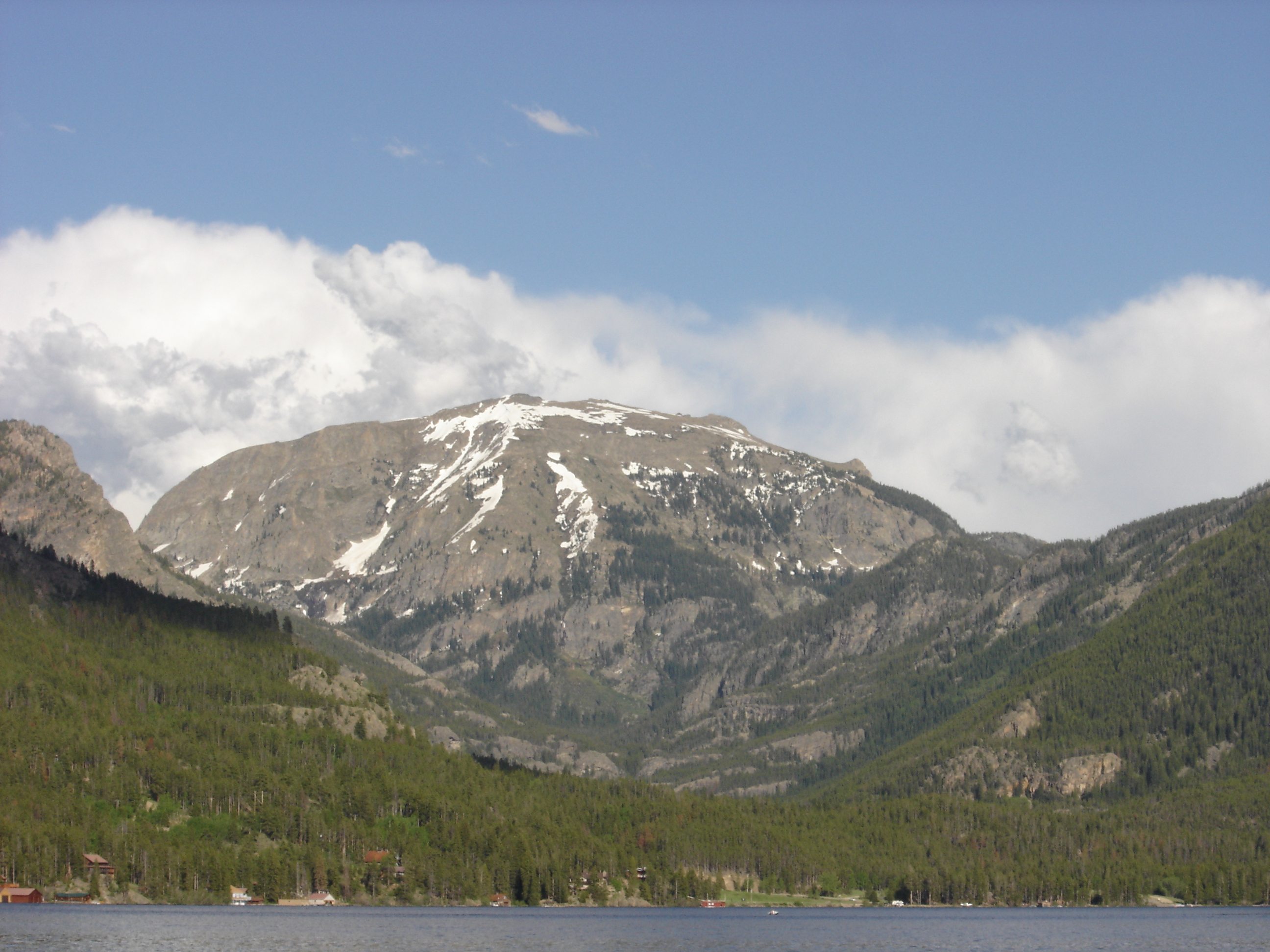

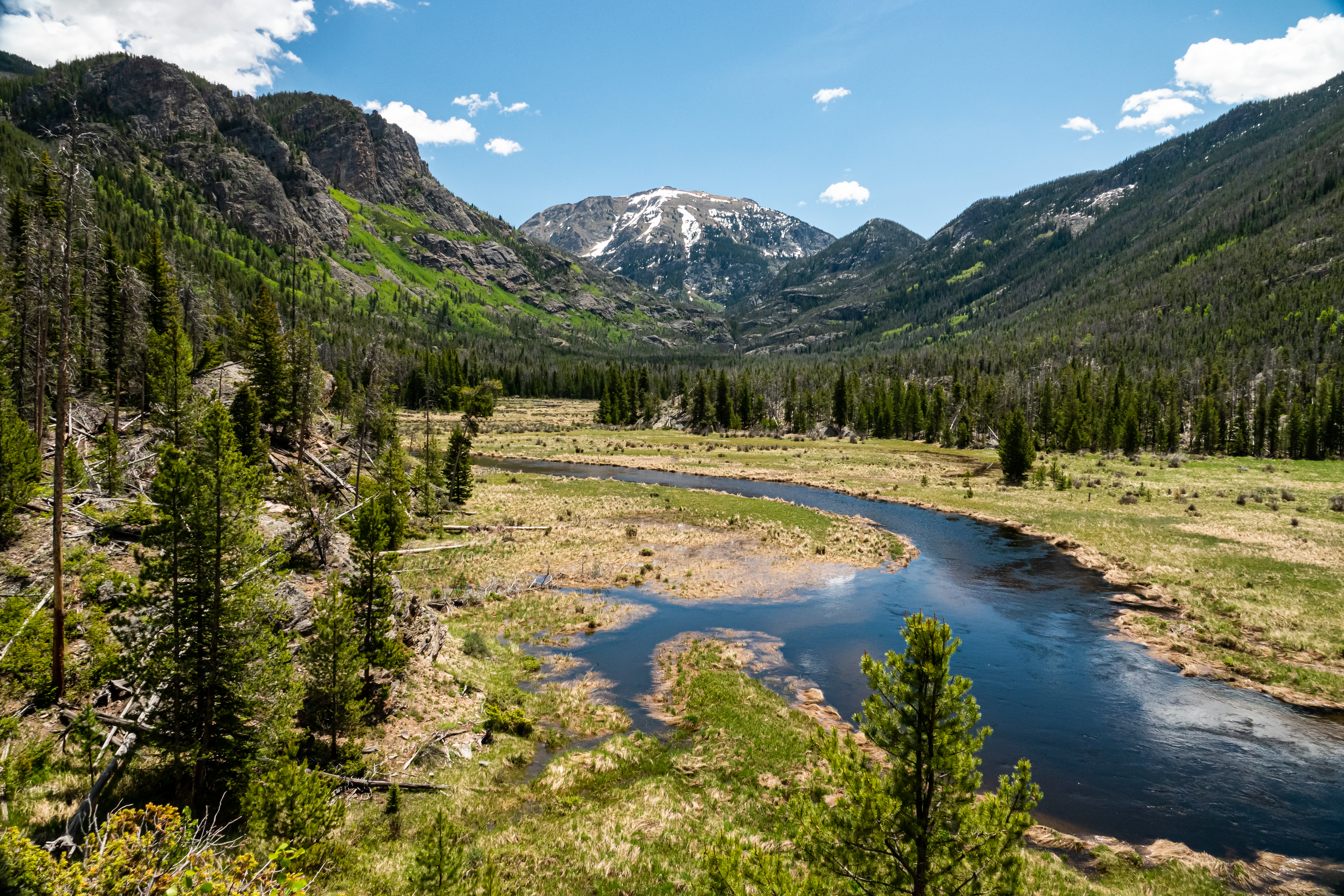
Mount Craig (Baldy) from East Inlet meadow

== See also ==
- List of peaks in Rocky Mountain National Park
