= Powell Peak =

Mountain in Colorado, United States

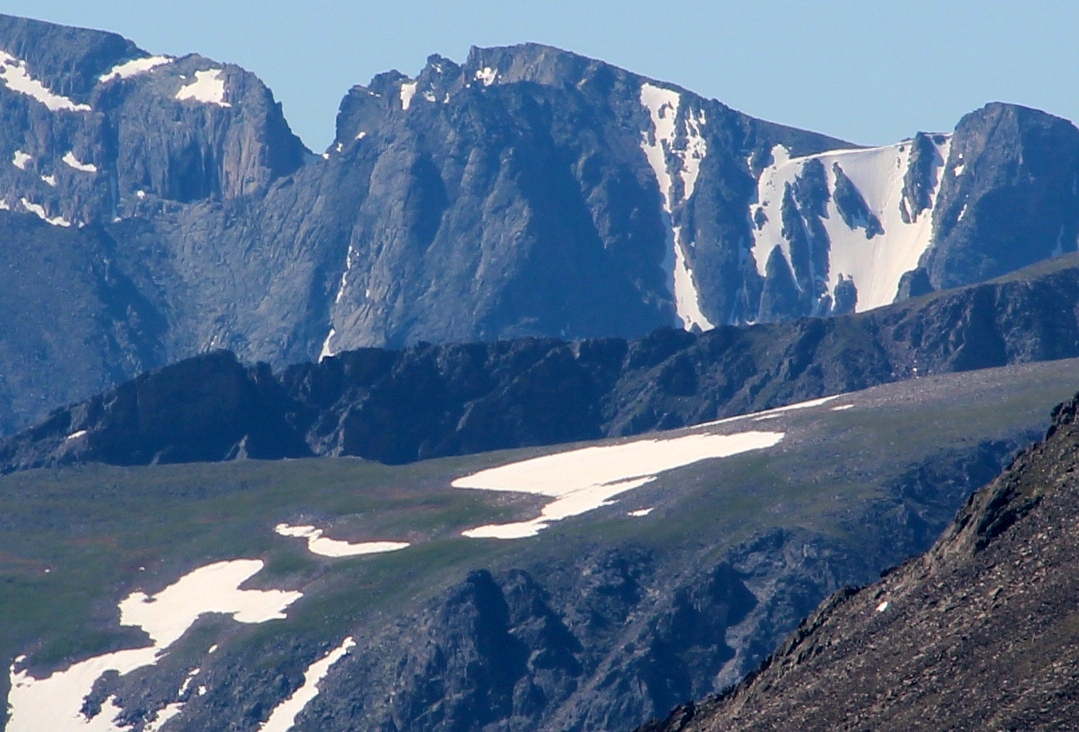
- Powell Peak viewed from the Tundra Communities Trail, Rocky Mountain National Park

Highest point
- Elevation: 4,015 m (13,173 ft)
- Prominence: 212 m (696 ft)
- Parent peak: McHenrys Peak (13,327 ft)
- Coordinates: 40°15′57″N 105°39′53″W

Naming
- Etymology: John Wesley Powell

Geography
- Location within Colorado Location within the United States
- Country: United States
- State: Colorado
- County: Grand County / Larimer County
- Protected area: Rocky Mountain National Park
- Parent range: Rocky Mountains; Front Range
- Topo map: USGS McHenrys Peak

Powell Peak is a summit in Grand County, Colorado, in the United States. With an elevation of 13,176 feet (4,016 m), Powell Peak is the 493rd-highest summit in the state of Colorado.

The peak was named for John Wesley Powell. The mountain's toponym was officially adopted in 1961 by the United States Board on Geographic Names.

Precipitation runoff from the mountain's east slope drains into Glacier Creek which is a tributary of the Big Thompson River, and the west slope drains to Grand Lake via North Inlet.

== Climate ==
According to the Köppen climate classification system, the peak is located in an alpine subarctic climate zone with cold, snowy winters, and cool to warm summers. Due to its altitude, it receives precipitation all year, as snow in winter, and as thunderstorms in summer, with a dry period in late spring.

== See also ==
- List of peaks in Rocky Mountain National Park
- Thirteener
