= McHenrys Peak =

Mountain in the state of Colorado

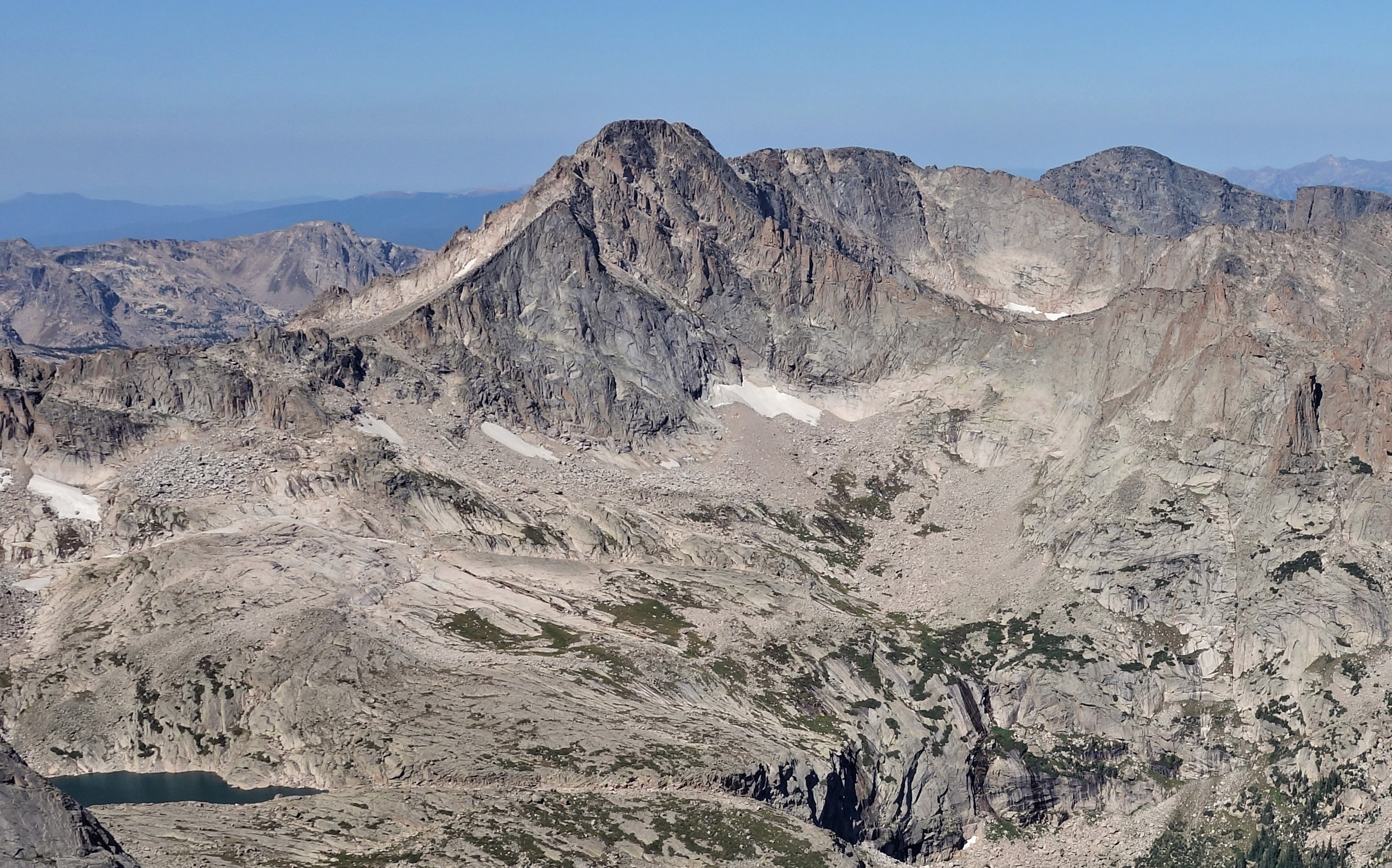
- East aspect

Highest point
- Elevation: 13,327 ft (4,062 m)
- Prominence: 884 ft (269 m)
- Parent peak: Chiefs Head Peak (13,577 ft)
- Isolation: 1.23 mi (1.98 km)
- Coordinates: 40°15′47″N 105°39′27″W

Naming
- Etymology: Prof. Benjamin F. McHenry

Geography
- Location within Colorado Location within the United States
- Country: United States
- State: Colorado
- County: Grand County / Larimer County
- Protected area: Rocky Mountain National Park
- Parent range: Rocky Mountains; Front Range
- Topo map: USGS McHenrys Peak

Geology
- Rock age: Precambrian
- Rock type: Granite of Longs Peak batholith

Climbing
- Easiest route: class 3 scrambling

McHenrys Peak is a 13,327-foot-elevation (4,062-meter) mountain summit on the boundary shared by Grand County and Larimer County in Colorado, United States.

== Description ==
McHenrys Peak is set on the Continental Divide in the Front Range of the Rocky Mountains. The mountain is situated within Rocky Mountain National Park. It is the fifth-highest peak in Larimer County. Precipitation runoff from the mountain's east slope drains into Glacier Creek which is a tributary of the Big Thompson River, and the west slope drains to Grand Lake via North Inlet. Topographic relief is significant as the summit rises 1,850 feet (560 meters) above Lake Powell in 0.62 mile (1 km) and 2,725 feet (831 meters) above Black Lake in one mile (1.6 km).

== Etymology ==
The mountain's toponym was officially adopted in 1911 by the United States Board on Geographic Names. Abner Sprague named the peak after Professor Benjamin F. McHenry of Union Christian College, Merom. McHenry spent three summers in this area during the 1890s. Abner Sprague had a homestead at Sprague Lake with a view of McHenry Peak, Otis Peak, and Hallett Peak.

== Climate ==
According to the Köppen climate classification system, McHenrys Peak is located in an alpine subarctic climate zone with cold, snowy winters, and cool to warm summers. Due to its altitude, it receives precipitation all year, as snow in winter and as thunderstorms in summer, with a dry period in late spring.

== Gallery ==
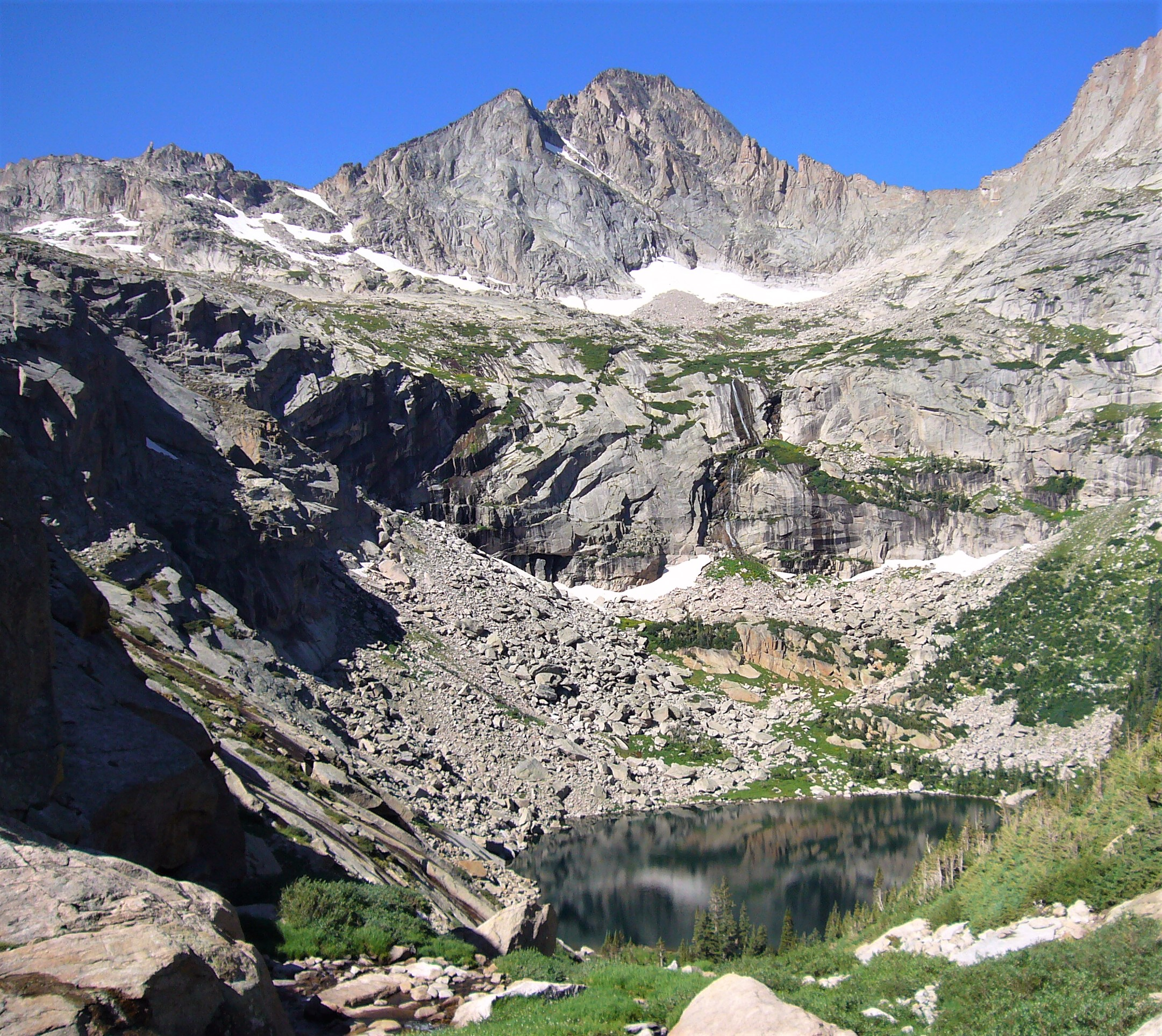
East face above Black Lake

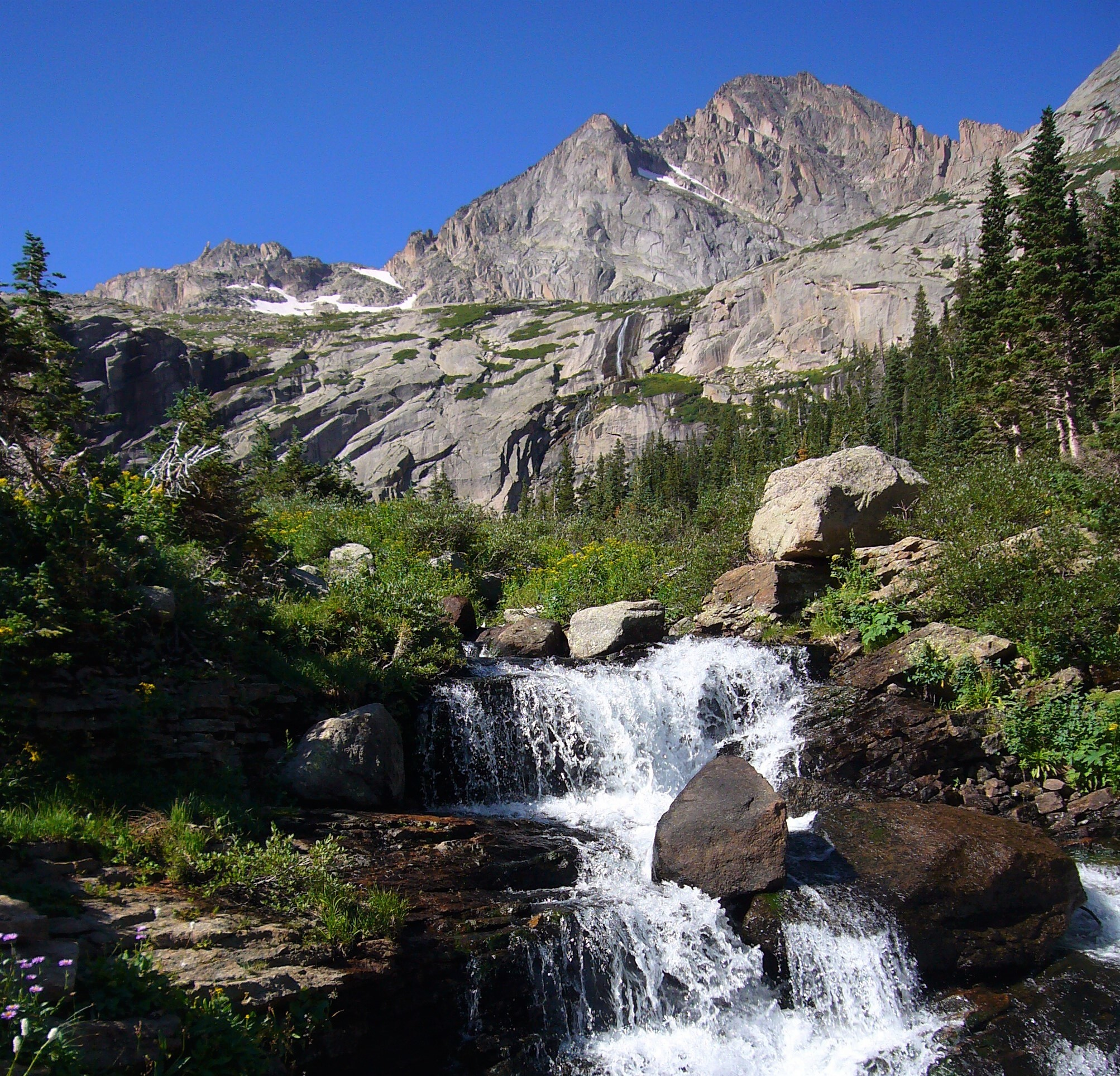
McHenrys with Ribbon Falls

== See also ==
- List of peaks in Rocky Mountain National Park
- Thirteener
