= Taylor Peak (Grand County, Colorado) =

Mountain in Colorado, United States

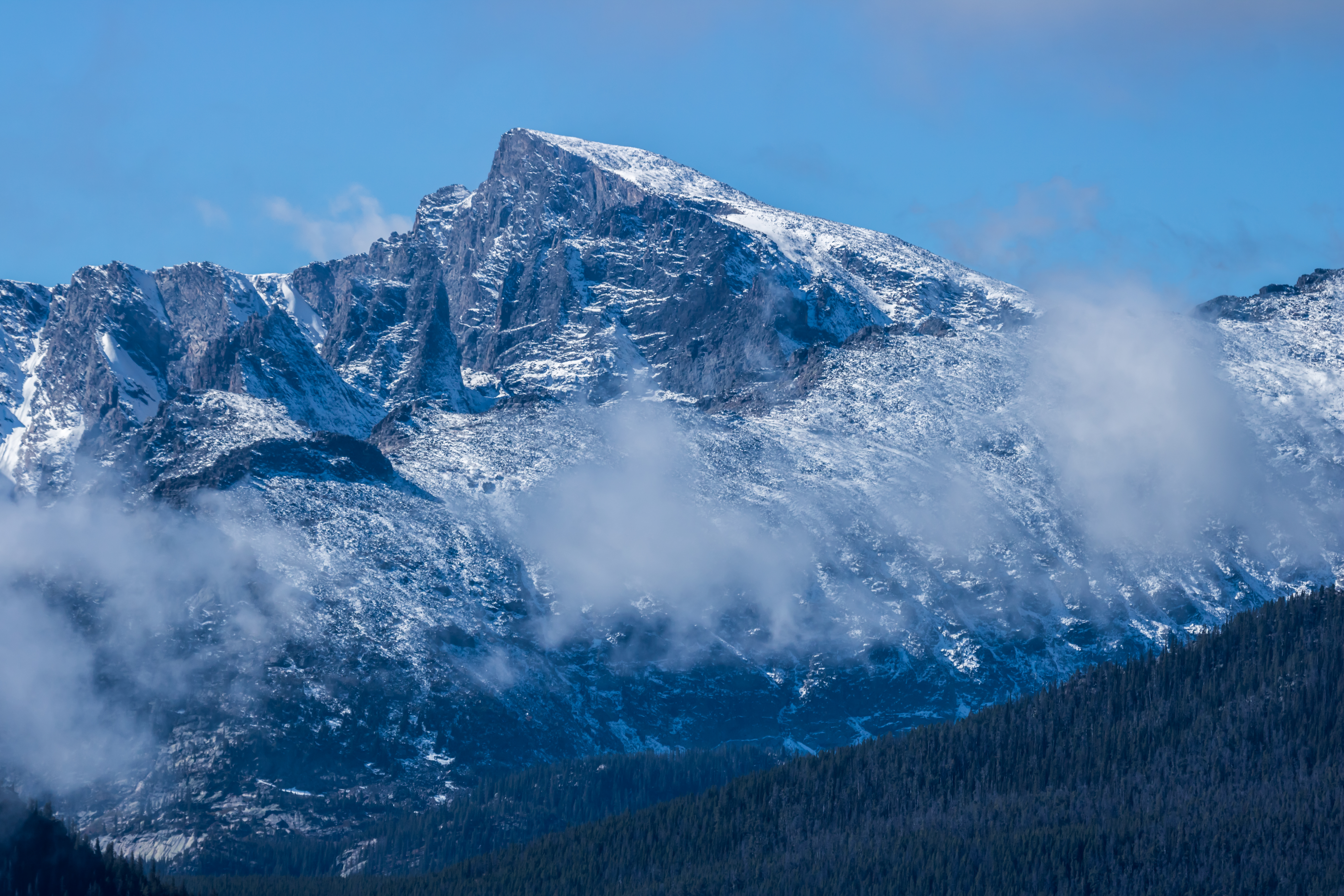
- Taylor Peak

Highest point
- Elevation: 13,158 ft (4,011 m)
- Prominence: 413 ft (126 m)
- Isolation: 1.03 mi (1.66 km)
- Coordinates: 40°16′28″N 105°40′51″W

Geography
- Location within Colorado Location within the United States
- Location: Rocky Mountain National Park on the Continental Divide between Grand and Larimer counties, Colorado, United States
- Parent range: Front Range
- Topo map(s): USGS 7.5' topographic map McHenrys Peak, Colorado

Climbing
- Easiest route: Scramble

Taylor Peak, elevation 13,158 ft (4,011 m), is a summit in the Front Range of north central Colorado. The peak is in Rocky Mountain National Park at the head of Loch Vale and just north of Taylor Glacier.

== Historical names ==
- Taylor Peak – 1932
- The Bangs

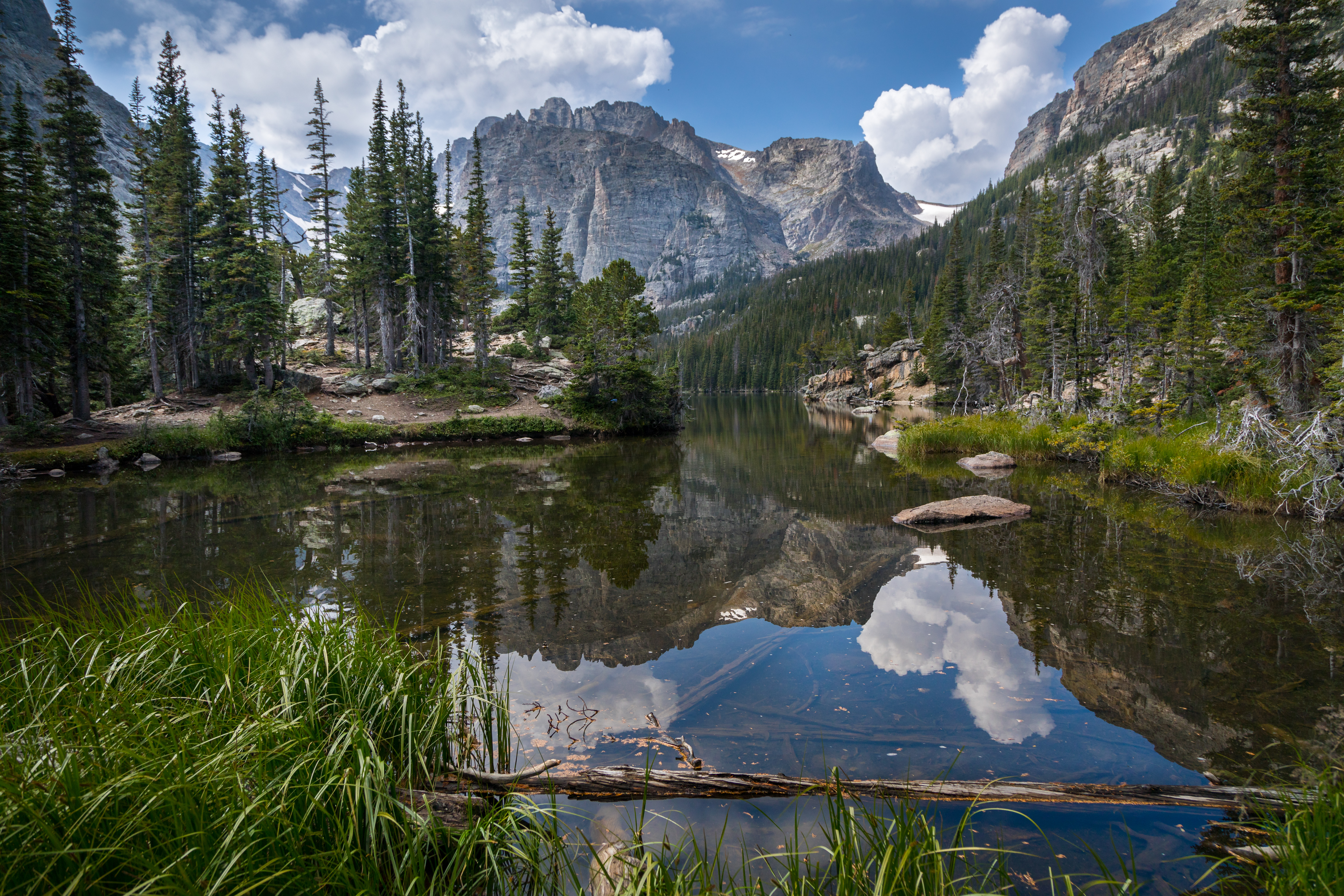
Taylor Peak above "The Loch"

== See also ==
- List of Colorado mountain ranges
- List of Colorado mountain summits
  - List of Colorado fourteeners
  - List of Colorado 4000 meter prominent summits
  - List of the most prominent summits of Colorado
- List of Colorado county high points
