= Mount Alice (Colorado) =

Mountain in Colorado, United States

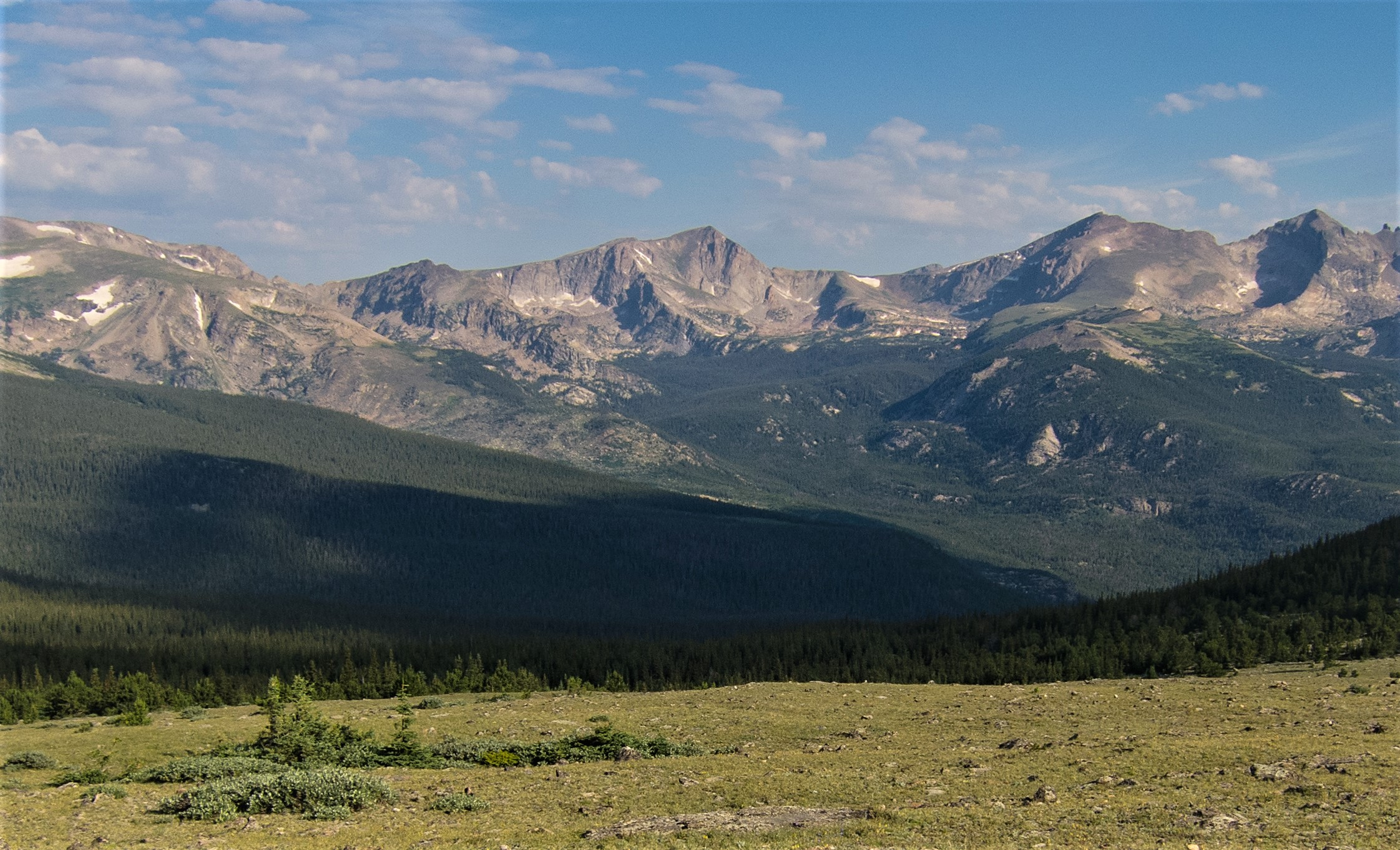
- Southeast aspect, centered

Highest point
- Elevation: 13,315 ft (4,058 m)
- Prominence: 850 ft (259 m)
- Parent peak: Chiefs Head Peak (13,577 ft)
- Isolation: 1.37 mi (2.20 km)
- Coordinates: 40°14′21″N 105°39′48″W

Geography
- Location within Colorado
- Location: Rocky Mountain National Park adjacent to Continental Divide between Boulder and Grand counties, Colorado, U.S.
- Parent range: Front Range
- Topo map(s): USGS 7.5' topographic map Isolation Peak, Colorado

Climbing
- Easiest route: Class 3 scramble

Mount Alice is a high mountain summit in the northern Front Range of the Rocky Mountains of North America. The 13,315-foot (4,058 m) thirteener is located in the Rocky Mountain National Park Wilderness, 12.0 miles (19.3 km) southwest by south (bearing 217°) of the Town of Estes Park, Colorado, United States, immediately east of the Continental Divide between Boulder and Grand counties. Just who the namesake Alice was is unclear, but according to one source she was likely a "woman of ill repute".

== Climbing ==
The standard routes to the summit can be climbed in a long day out of Wild Basin. Most climbers ascend via Hourglass Ridge above Lion lakes or else via Boulder Grand Pass above Thunder Lake. Both are class 3 routes and do not require any technical moves.

== Historical names ==
- Mount Alice – 1911
- Sioux Mountain

== See also ==
- List of Colorado mountain ranges
- List of Colorado mountain summits
  - List of Colorado fourteeners
  - List of Colorado 4000 meter prominent summits
  - List of the most prominent summits of Colorado
- List of Colorado county high points
