= List of dams in the Colorado River system =

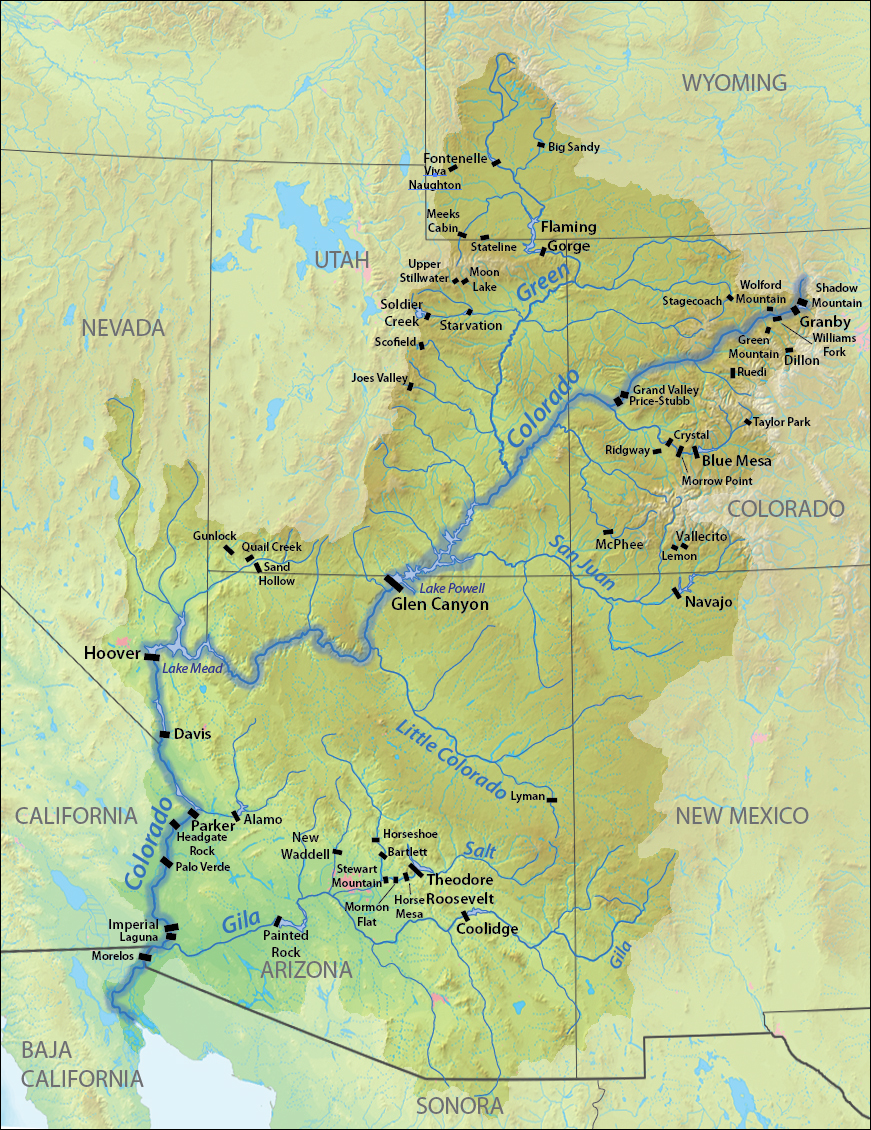
Map showing locations of major dams in the Colorado River basin. Lee's Ferry, which separates the Upper and Lower Basins, is located just downriver from Glen Canyon Dam.

This is a list of dams on the Colorado River system of the southwestern United States and northwestern Mexico. The Colorado runs 1,450 mi (2,330 km) from the Rocky Mountains to the Gulf of California, draining parts of seven U.S. states and two Mexican states. The river system is one of the most heavily developed in the world, with fifteen dams on the main stem of the Colorado and hundreds more on tributaries. Collectively, dams in the Colorado River basin can hold four to five times the river's annual flow, generating hydroelectricity and supplying irrigation and municipal water for over 35 million people.

Dams on tributaries are listed if they are taller than 250 ft (76 m), store more than 50,000 acre⋅ft (62,000 dam^{3}), or are otherwise historically notable. Tributary dams are organized into two lists; those in the Upper Basin, defined as the half of the Colorado River basin above Lee's Ferry, Arizona, and the Lower Basin. The Upper Basin include such tributary systems as the Green, Gunnison and San Juan. Tributaries in the Lower Basin include the Little Colorado, Virgin and Gila. A key tributary of the San Juan River, the Animas River, was severely affected by the EPA's accidental August 2015 Gold King Mine waste water spill.

Notes:

- Flood control: Temporary retention and quick release of flood flows
- Hydropower: Generation of electricity utilizing water flow through the hydraulic head provided by the dam and reservoir
- Irrigation: Provision and storage of water for agriculture
- Municipal: Provision and storage of water for residential, commercial and industrial uses
- Regulation: To control erratic inflows to provide either a stable flow downstream or to release water on demand to downstream users

== Main stem ==
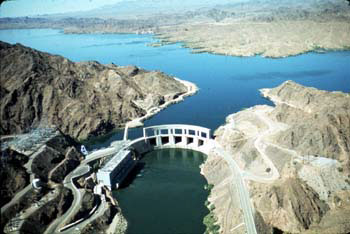
Parker Dam (AZ-CA)

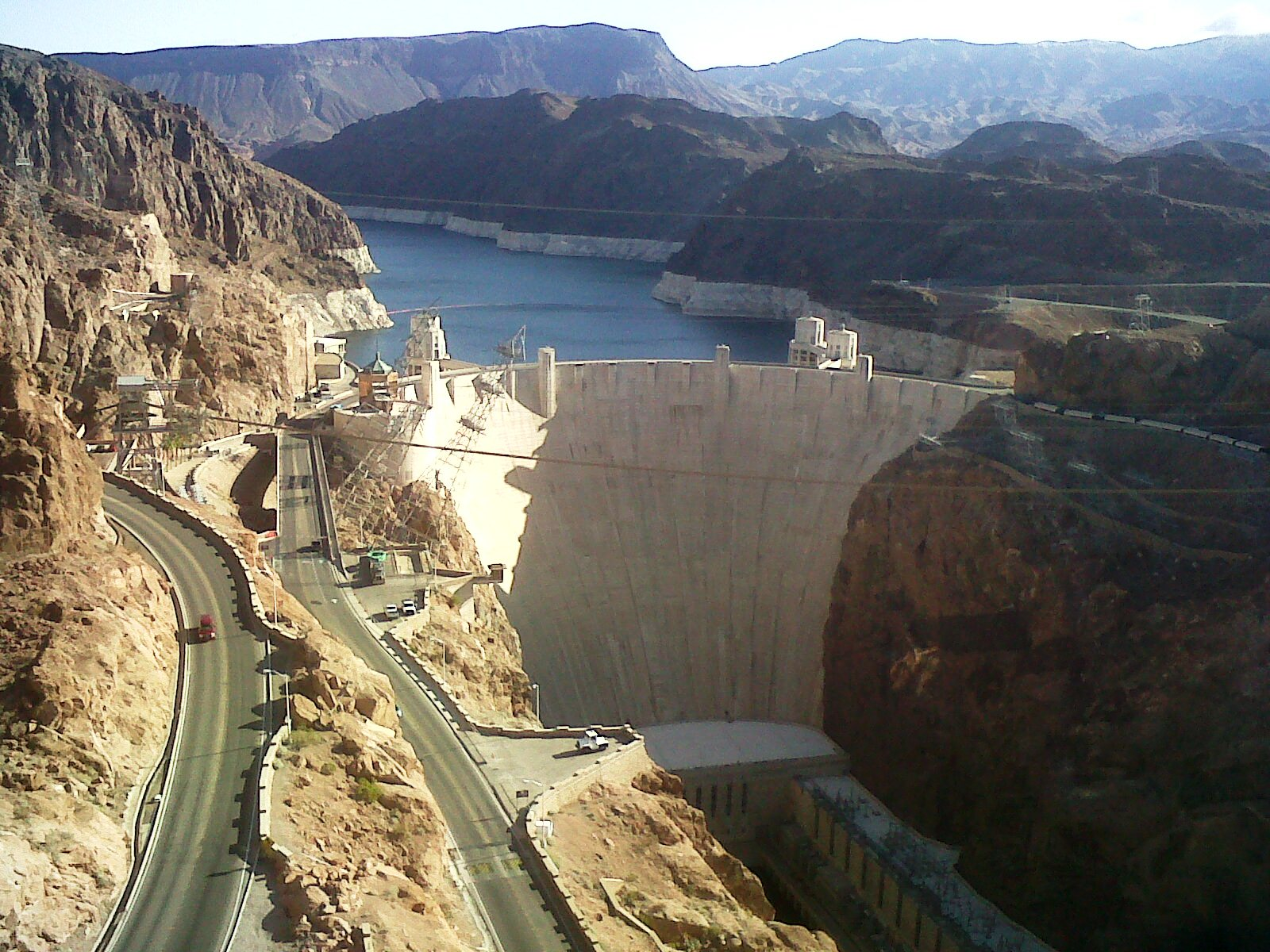
Hoover Dam (AZ-NV)

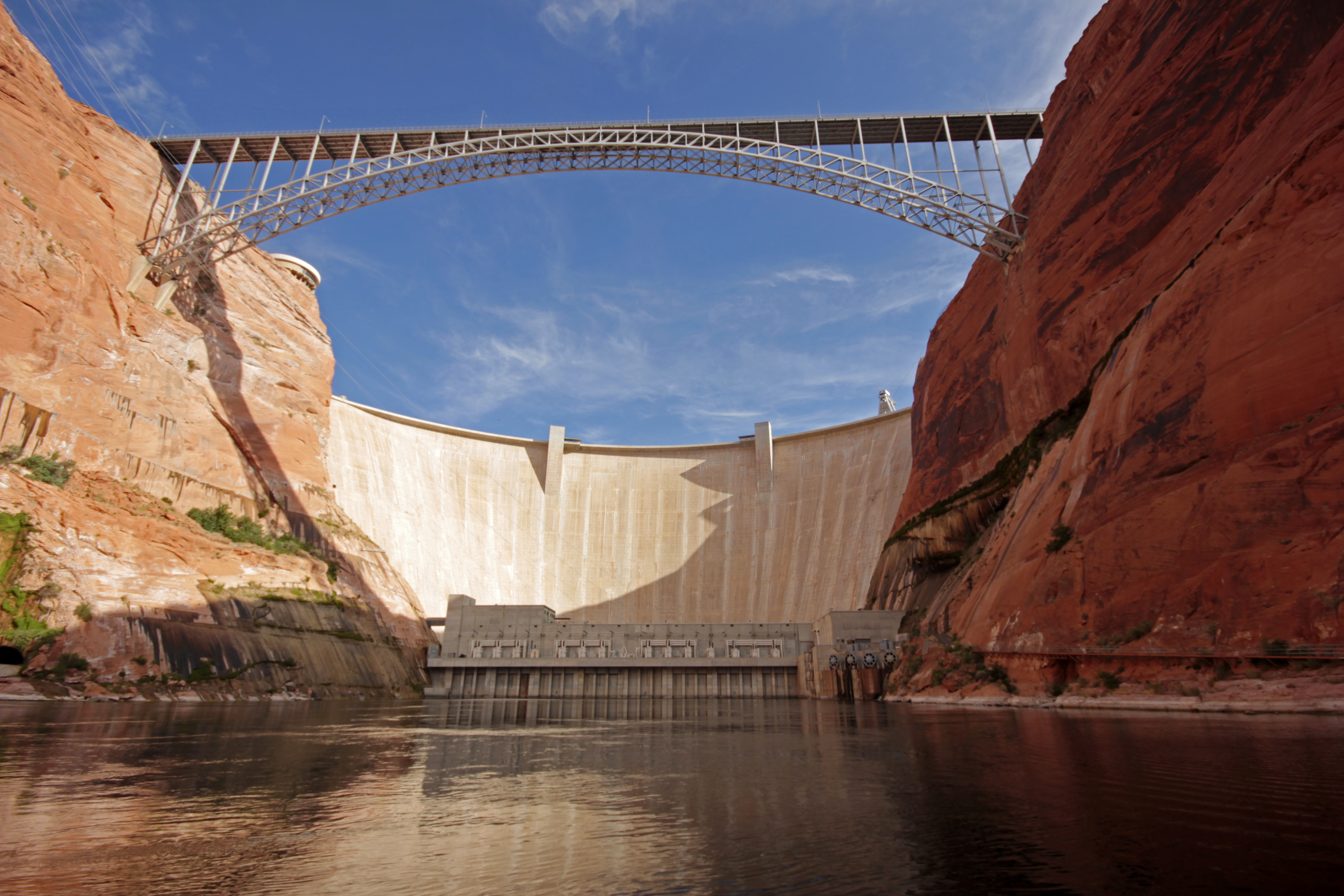
Glen Canyon Dam (AZ)

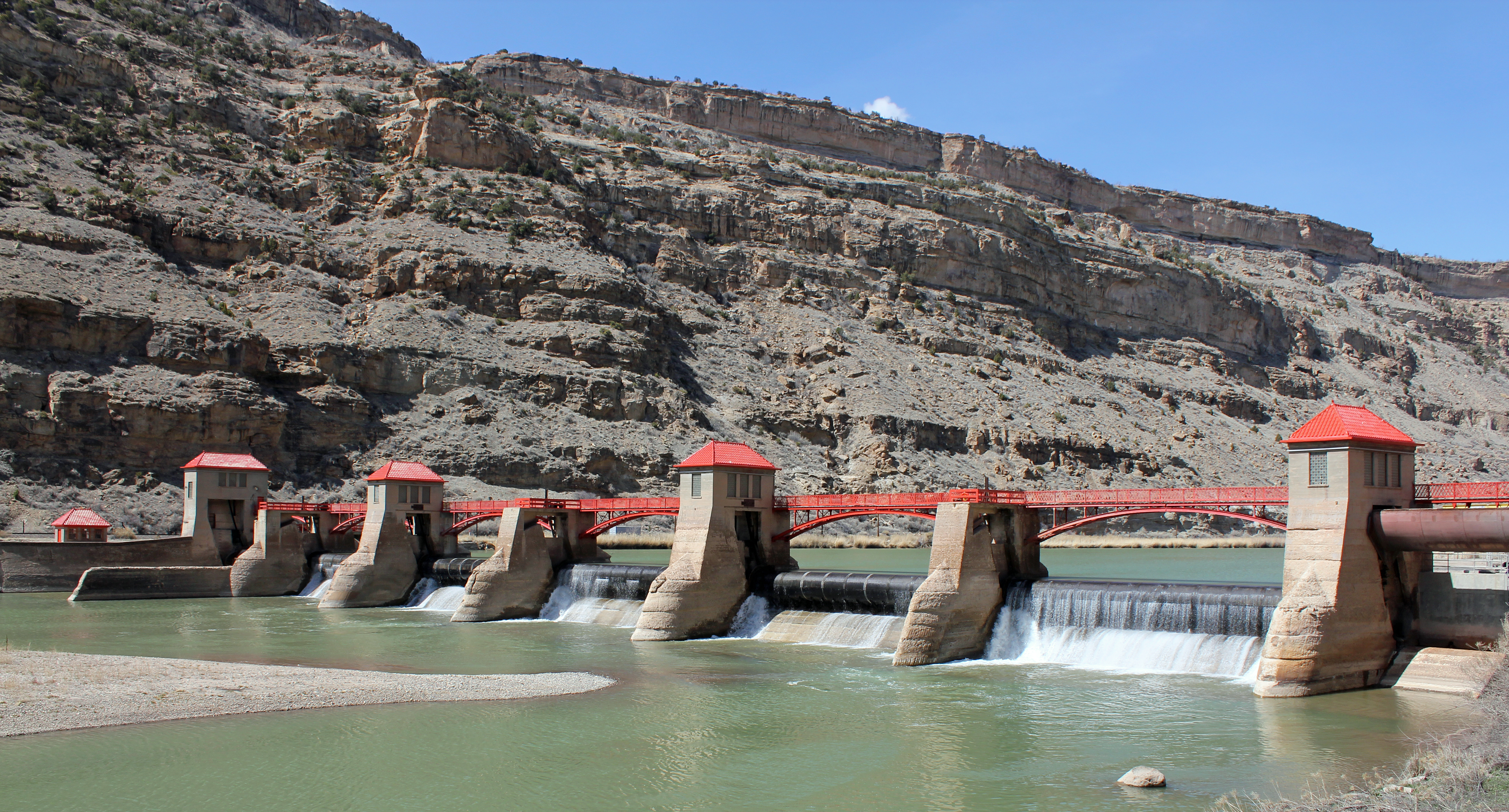
Grand Valley Diversion Dam (CO)

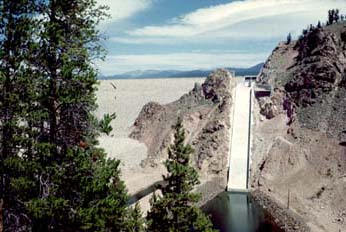
Granby Dam (CO)

| Name | State | Owner | Purpose | Year completed | Reservoir | Reservoir capacity | Capacity (MW) | Annual generation (MWh) | Refs |
|---|---|---|---|---|---|---|---|---|---|
| Morelos Dam | AZ; BC | IBWC | Irrigation | 1950 | N/A | N/A | N/A | N/A | |
| Laguna Diversion Dam | AZ; CA | USBR | Diversion | 1905 | Mittry Lake | N/A | N/A | N/A | |
| Imperial Dam | AZ; CA | USBR | Irrigation | 1938 | Imperial Reservoir | 160,000 acre.ft (197,400 dam^{3}) | N/A | N/A | (Note: Reservoir capacity given is the original capacity in 1938 before siltation.) |
| Palo Verde Dam | AZ; CA | USBR | Diversion | 1958 | N/A | N/A | N/A | N/A | |
| Headgate Rock Dam | AZ; CA | BIA | Irrigation | 1941 | Moovalya Lake | N/A | 19.5 | ? | |
| Parker Dam | AZ; CA | USBR | Hydropower; Irrigation; Municipal | 1938 | Lake Havasu | 646,200 acre.ft (797,100 dam^{3}) | 120 | 456,944 | |
| Davis Dam | AZ; NV | USBR | Hydropower; Regulation | 1951 | Lake Mohave | 1,818,300 acre.ft (2,242,800 dam^{3}) | 255 | 1,147,673 | |
| Hoover Dam | AZ; NV | USBR | Flood control Hydropower; Irrigation; Municipal; Regulation | 1936 | Lake Mead | 28,945,000 acre.ft (35,702,400 dam^{3}) | 2,079 | 3,806,935 | |
| Glen Canyon Dam | AZ | USBR | Hydropower; Regulation | 1966 | Lake Powell | 26,214,900 acre.ft (32,334,900 dam^{3}) | 1,296 | 3,454,847 | |
| Price-Stubb Dam | CO | PCID (Note: Palisade County Irrigation District); MCID (Note: Mesa County Irrigation District) | Irrigation | 1911 | N/A | N/A | N/A | N/A | (Note: Dam went out of operation in 1919 after the completion of the Grand Valley Diversion Dam upstream, but remains in place) |
| Grand Valley Diversion Dam | CO | USBR | Irrigation | 1916 | N/A | N/A | 3 | 19,350 | |
| Windy Gap Dam | CO | Northern Water | Irrigation; Municipal | 1970 | Windy Gap Reservoir | 445 acre.ft (549 dam^{3}) | N/A | N/A | |
| Granby Dam | CO | USBR | Irrigation; Municipal | 1950 | Lake Granby | 539,800 acre.ft (665,800 dam^{3}) | N/A | N/A | |
| Shadow Mountain Dam | CO | USBR | Irrigation; Municipal | 1946 | Shadow Mountain Lake | 18,400 acre.ft (22,700 dam^{3}) | N/A | N/A | |
| Total | | | | | | 58,343,045 acre.ft (71,963,595 dam^{3}) | 3,772.5 | 8,885,749 | |

== Upper Basin ==
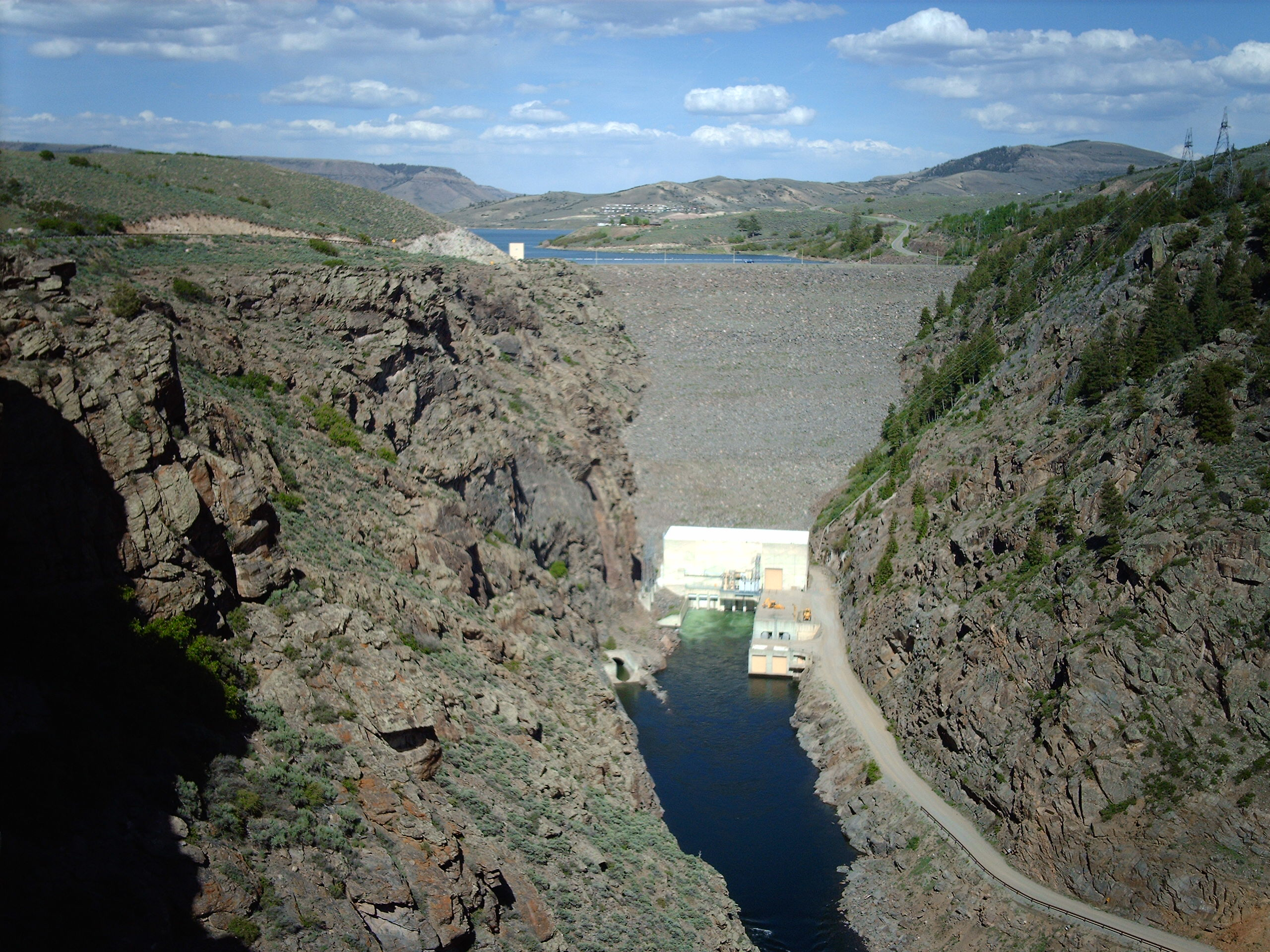
Blue Mesa Dam (CO)

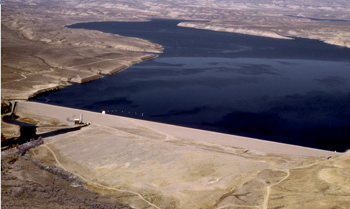
Fontenelle Dam (WY)

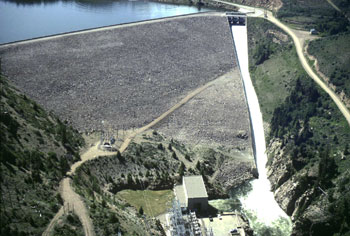
Green Mountain Dam (CO)

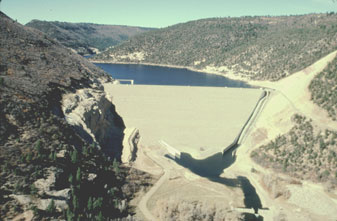
McPhee Dam (CO)

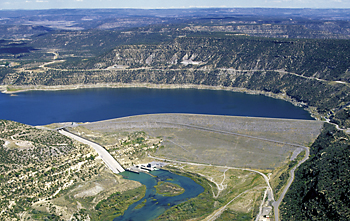
Navajo Dam (NM)

| Name | State | Stream | Owner | Purpose | Year completed | Reservoir | Reservoir capacity | Capacity (MW) | Annual generation (MWh) | Refs |
|---|---|---|---|---|---|---|---|---|---|---|
| Blue Mesa Dam | CO | Gunnison | USBR | Flood control Hydropower; Regulation | 1966 | Blue Mesa Reservoir | 940,700 acre.ft (1,160,300 dam^{3}) | 86.4 | 203,412 | |
| Dillon Dam | CO | Blue | Denver Water | Irrigation; Municipal | 1963 | Dillon Reservoir | 257,304 acre.ft (317,373 dam^{3}) | 1.8 | ? | |
| Flaming Gorge Dam | UT | Green | USBR | Flood control Hydropower; Regulation | 1964 | Flaming Gorge Reservoir | 3,788,700 acre.ft (4,673,200 dam^{3}) | 153 | 344,369 | |
| Fontenelle Dam | WY | Green | USBR | Flood control Irrigation | 1964 | Fontenelle Reservoir | 345,360 acre.ft (426,990 dam^{3}) | 10 | 67,043 | |
| Green Mountain Dam | CO | Blue | USBR | Hydropower; Regulation | 1943 | Green Mountain Reservoir | 153,639 acre.ft (189,507 dam^{3}) | 21.6 | 60,228 | |
| Joes Valley Dam | UT | Seely Cr. | USBR | Irrigation; Municipal | 1966 | Joes Valley Reservoir | 54,920 acre.ft (67,740 dam^{3}) | N/A | N/A | |
| McPhee Dam | CO | Dolores | USBR | Flood control Irrigation | 1984 | McPhee Reservoir | 381,195 acre.ft (470,187 dam^{3}) | 1.283 | 5,335 | |
| Morrow Point Dam | CO | Gunnison | USBR | Hydropower | 1968 | Morrow Point Reservoir | 117,190 acre.ft (144,550 dam^{3}) | 173.334 | 292,887 | |
| Navajo Dam | NM | San Juan | USBR | Flood control Irrigation; Municipal; Regulation | 1962 | Navajo Lake | 1,708,600 acre.ft (2,107,500 dam^{3}) | 32 | 215,000 | (Note: Annual power generation calculated from a power station hydraulic head of 381.6 ft (116.3 m) and average annual flow of 1,082 cu ft/s (30.6 m^{3}/s) in the San Juan River below the dam, 1963–2012.) |
| Ridges Basin Dam | CO | Offstream | USBR | Irrigation | 2007 | Lake Nighthorse | 120,000 acre.ft (148,000 dam^{3}) | N/A | N/A | |
| Ridgway Dam | CO | Uncompahgre | USBR | Flood control Irrigation | 1987 | Ridgway Reservoir | 84,410 acre.ft (104,120 dam^{3}) | N/A | N/A | |
| Ruedi Dam | CO | Fryingpan | USBR | Irrigation; Municipal | 1968 | Ruedi Reservoir | 102,000 acre.ft (125,800 dam^{3}) | N/A | N/A | |
| Scofield Dam | UT | Price | USBR | Irrigation; Municipal | 1946 | Scofield Reservoir | 73,600 acre.ft (90,780 dam^{3}) | N/A | N/A | |
| Soldier Creek Dam | UT | Strawberry | USBR | Irrigation; Municipal | 1974 | Strawberry Reservoir | 1,127,610 acre.ft (1,390,860 dam^{3}) | N/A | N/A | |
| Starvation Dam | UT | Strawberry | USBR | Irrigation | 1970 | Starvation Reservoir | 167,300 acre.ft (206,400 dam^{3}) | N/A | N/A | |
| Taylor Park Dam | CO | Taylor | USBR | Irrigation | 1937 | Taylor Park Reservoir | 106,200 acre.ft (130,990 dam^{3}) | N/A | N/A | |
| Vallecito Dam | CO | Los Pinos River | USBR | Irrigation | 1941 | Vallecito Reservoir | 129,700 acre.ft (160,000 dam^{3}) | N/A | N/A | |
| Vega Dam | CO | Plateau Creek | USBR | Irrigation | 1959 | Vega Reservoir | 33,800 acre.ft (41,691 dam^{3}) | N/A | N/A | |
| Williams Fork Dam | CO | Williams Fork | Denver Water | Irrigation; Municipal | 1959 | Williams Fork Reservoir | 96,822 acre.ft (119,426 dam^{3}) | 3.158 | ? | |
| Wolford Mountain Dam | CO | Muddy Cr. | CRWCD (Note: Colorado River Water Conservation District) | Irrigation; Municipal | 1996 | Wolford Mountain Reservoir | 66,000 acre.ft (81,400 dam^{3}) | N/A | N/A | |
| Total | | | | | | | 9,821,250 acre.ft (12,114,080 dam^{3}) | 482.575 | 1,188,274 | |

== Lower Basin ==
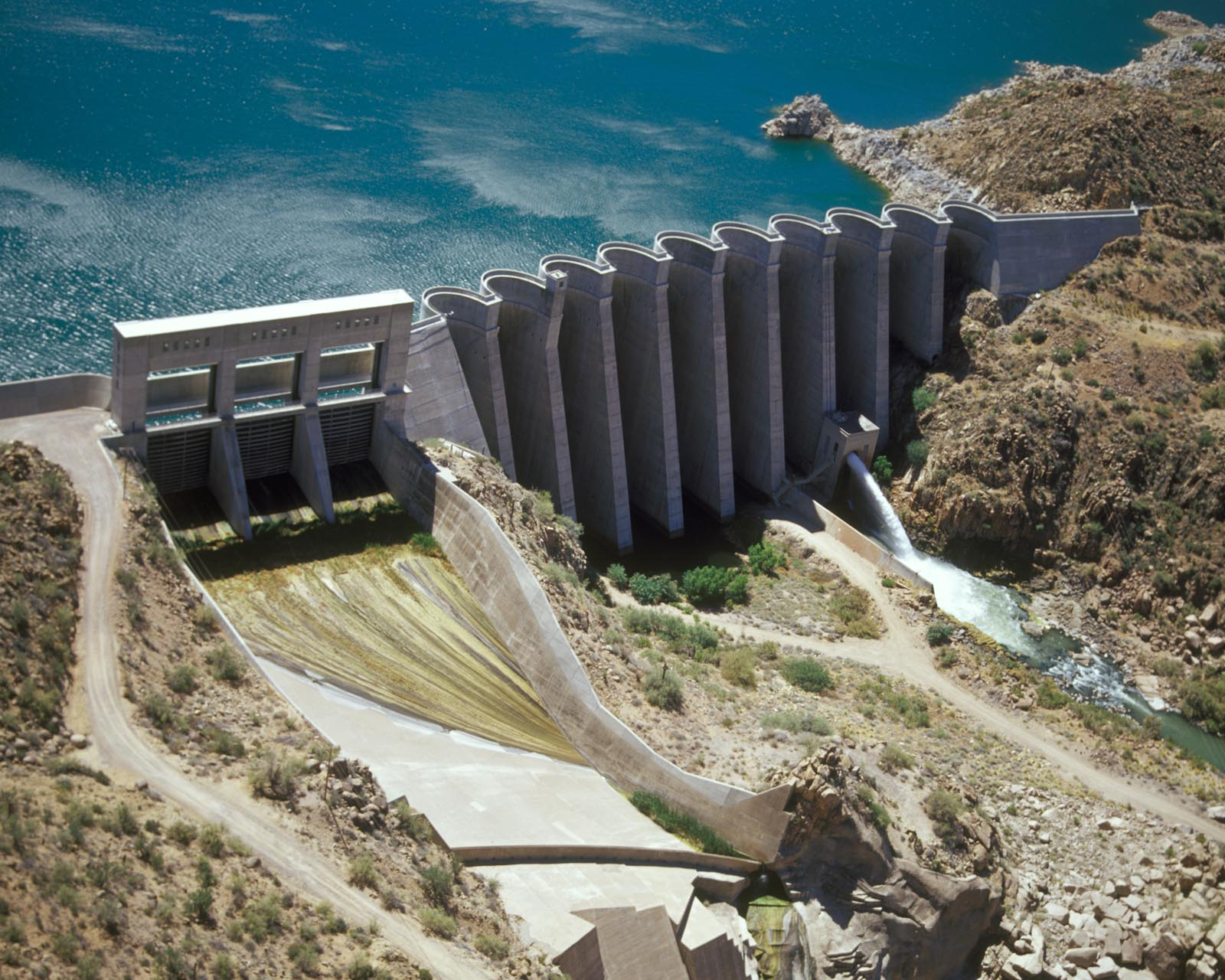
Bartlett Dam (AZ)

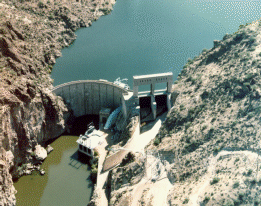
Mormon Flat Dam (AZ)

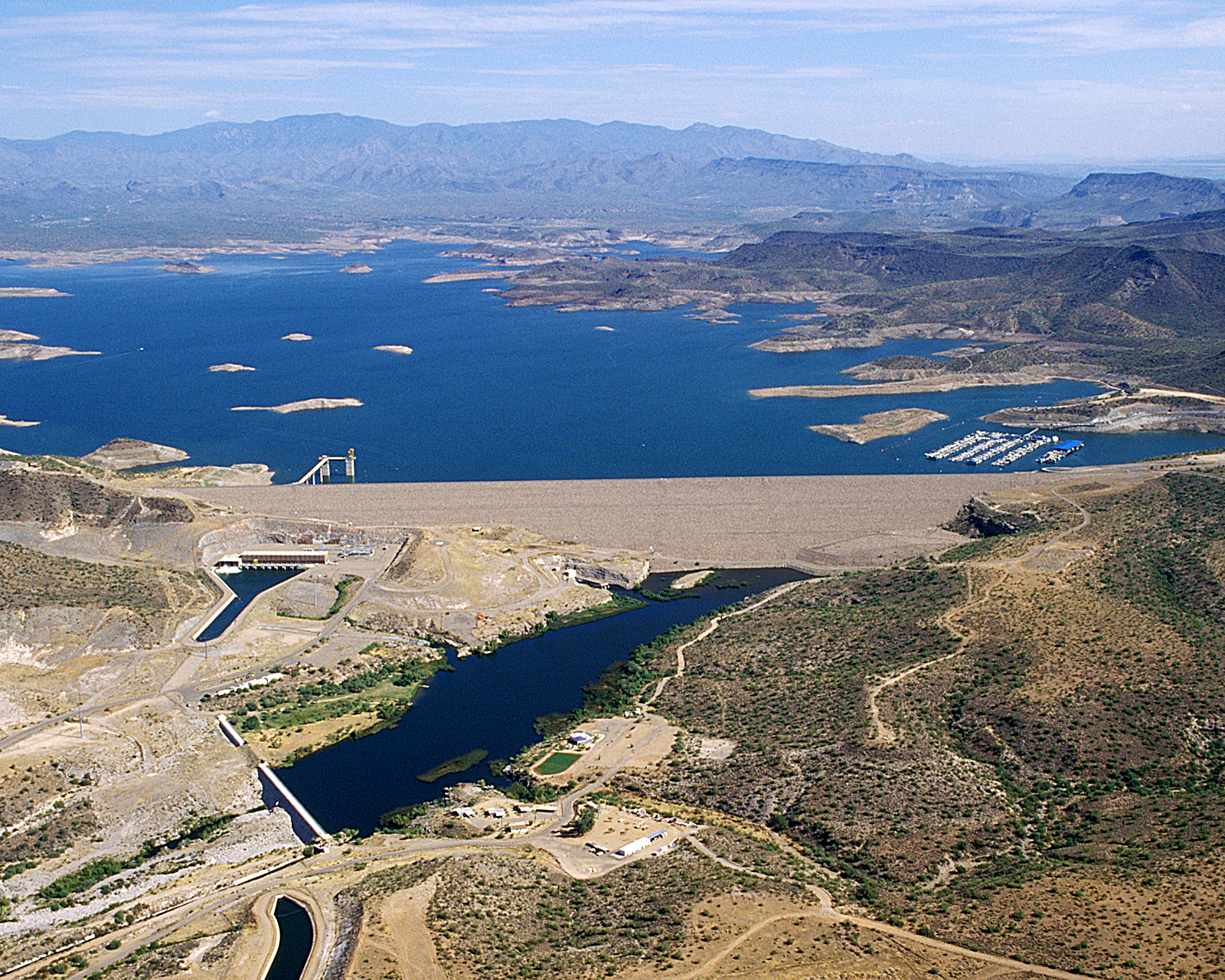
New Waddell Dam (AZ)

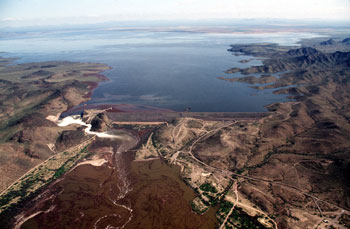
Painted Rock Dam (AZ)

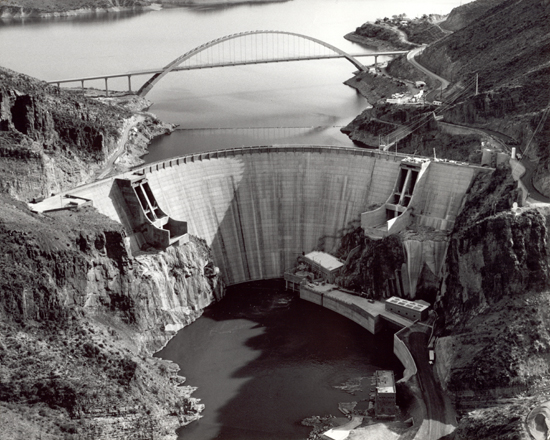
Theodore Roosevelt Dam (AZ)

| Name | State | Stream | Owner | Purpose | Year completed | Reservoir | Reservoir capacity | Capacity (MW) | Annual generation (MWh) | Refs |
|---|---|---|---|---|---|---|---|---|---|---|
| Alamo Dam | AZ | Bill Williams | USACE | Flood control | 1968 | Alamo Lake | 1,043,000 acre.ft (1,286,500 dam^{3}) | N/A | N/A | |
| Bartlett Dam | AZ | Verde | USBR | Flood control Irrigation | 1939 | Bartlett Lake | 176,186 acre.ft (217,318 dam^{3}) | N/A | N/A | |
| Coolidge Dam | AZ | Gila | BIA | Flood control Irrigation | 1930 | San Carlos Lake | 910,000 acre.ft (1,122,400 dam^{3}) | N/A | N/A | |
| Horse Mesa Dam | AZ | Salt | USBR | Hydropower; Regulation | 1927 | Apache Lake | 245,138 acre.ft (302,367 dam^{3}) | 129 | 126,900 | (Note: Annual generation calculated from a hydraulic head of 255 ft (78 m) and an average Salt River flow of 962 cu ft/s (27.2 m^{3}/s).) |
| Horseshoe Dam | AZ | Verde | USBR | Flood control Regulation | 1946 | Horseshoe Lake | 131,500 acre.ft (162,200 dam^{3}) | N/A | N/A | |
| Mormon Flat Dam | AZ | Salt | USBR | Hydropower; Regulation | 1925 | Canyon Lake | 57,852 acre.ft (71,358 dam^{3}) | 60 | 65,400 | (Note: Annual generation calculated from a hydraulic head of 131.5 ft (40.1 m) and an average Salt River flow of 962 cu ft/s (27.2 m^{3}/s).) |
| New Waddell Dam | AZ | Agua Fria | USBR | Irrigation; Municipal | 1994 | Lake Pleasant | 1,108,600 acre.ft (1,367,409 dam^{3}) | 45 | ? | |
| Painted Rock Dam | AZ | Gila | USACE | Flood control | 1960 | Painted Rock Reservoir | 2,491,700 acre.ft (3,073,400 dam^{3}) | N/A | N/A | |
| Sand Hollow Dam | UT | Offstream | WCWCD (Note: Washington County Water Conservation District) | Irrigation; Municipal | 2002 | Sand Hollow Reservoir | 51,360 acre.ft (63,350 dam^{3}) | N/A | N/A | |
| Stewart Mountain Dam | AZ | Salt | USBR | Hydropower; Regulation | 1930 | Saguaro Lake | 69,765 acre.ft (86,052 dam^{3}) | 13 | 57,700 | (Note: Annual generation calculated from a hydraulic head of 116 ft (35 m) and an average Salt River flow of 962 cu ft/s (27.2 m^{3}/s).) |
| Theodore Roosevelt Dam | AZ | Salt | USBR | Flood control Hydropower; Irrigation; Municipal | 1911 | Theodore Roosevelt Lake | 2,910,200 acre.ft (3,589,600 dam^{3}) | 36 | 123,900 | (Note: Annual generation calculated from a hydraulic head of 249 ft (76 m) and an average Salt River flow of 962 cu ft/s (27.2 m^{3}/s).) |
| Total | | | | | | | 9,195,301 acre.ft (11,342,000 dam^{3}) | 283 | 373,900 | |
