= Boulder Reservoir =

Boulder County, Colorado water storage and recreation reservoir

- Boulder City Reservoir
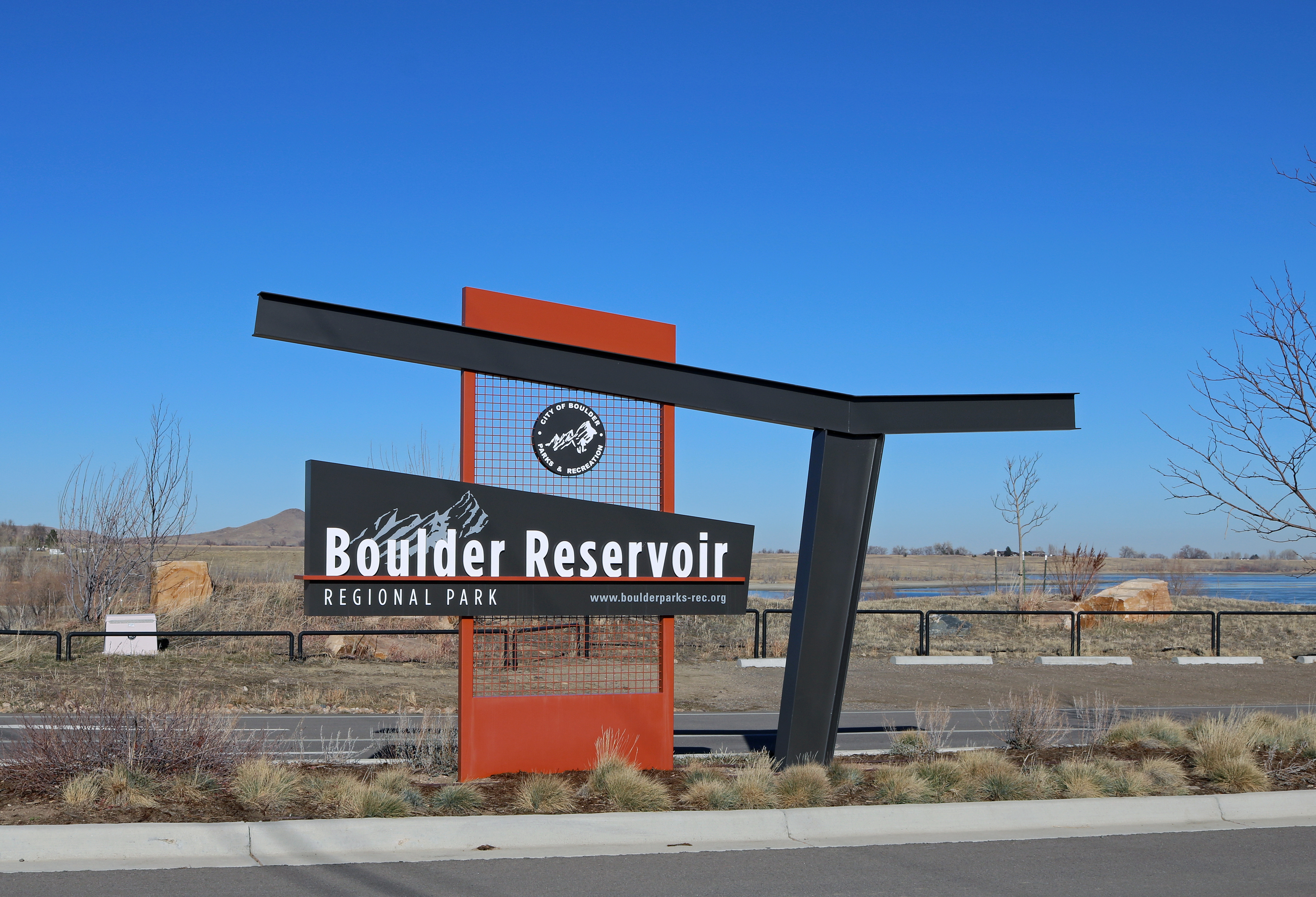
- The entrance sign.

- Location within Colorado Location within the United States
- Location: Boulder, Colorado
- Coordinates: 40°04′42″N 105°13′19″W
- Managing agency: Northern Colorado Water Conservancy District
- Built: May 1, 1954
- First flooded: February 11, 1955
- Water volume: 13,270 acre⋅ft (16.37×10^{6} m^{3})
- Surface elevation: 1,578 m (5,177 ft)

Boulder Reservoir is located in the northern part of Boulder, Colorado. It stores water for the Northern Colorado Water Conservancy District — also called Northern Water — and for the City of Boulder. The reservoir is the centerpiece of the Boulder Reservoir Regional Park, which is managed by the City of Boulder's Department of Parks and Recreation.

The reservoir receives most of its water from Colorado's Western Slope through the Alva B. Adams Tunnel and the Boulder Feeder Canal, both part of the Colorado-Big Thompson Project. Some of the stored water is used as part of Boulder's municipal water supply and some is used for agricultural purposes in Boulder and Weld counties.

== Boulder Reservoir Regional Park ==
The reservoir's surface area is 700 acres. According to Boulder's Parks and Recreation Department, the chief recreation activities at the park are "boating, swimming, sun bathing, water skiing, fishing, picnics, walking, running, cycling and wildlife viewing."

The reservoir has a robust Aquatics nuisance species mitigation program. All watercraft including stand up paddleboards, kayaks canoes belly boats and motorboats require a valid annual City of Boulder boat permit to use the facility. The facility prohibits dogs May 15 - Labor day and charges admission fees April - October.

The reservoir is popular among anglers, especially those fishing for walleye, smallmouth bass, and catfish. In recent years, the State of Colorado has stocked the reservoir with black crappie, saugeye, and rainbow trout. Ice fishing is also possible when the lake is frozen.

The reservoir was completed in 1955.

== See also ==
- List of reservoirs in Colorado
