= Shadow Mountain Dam =

Dam in Colorado, US

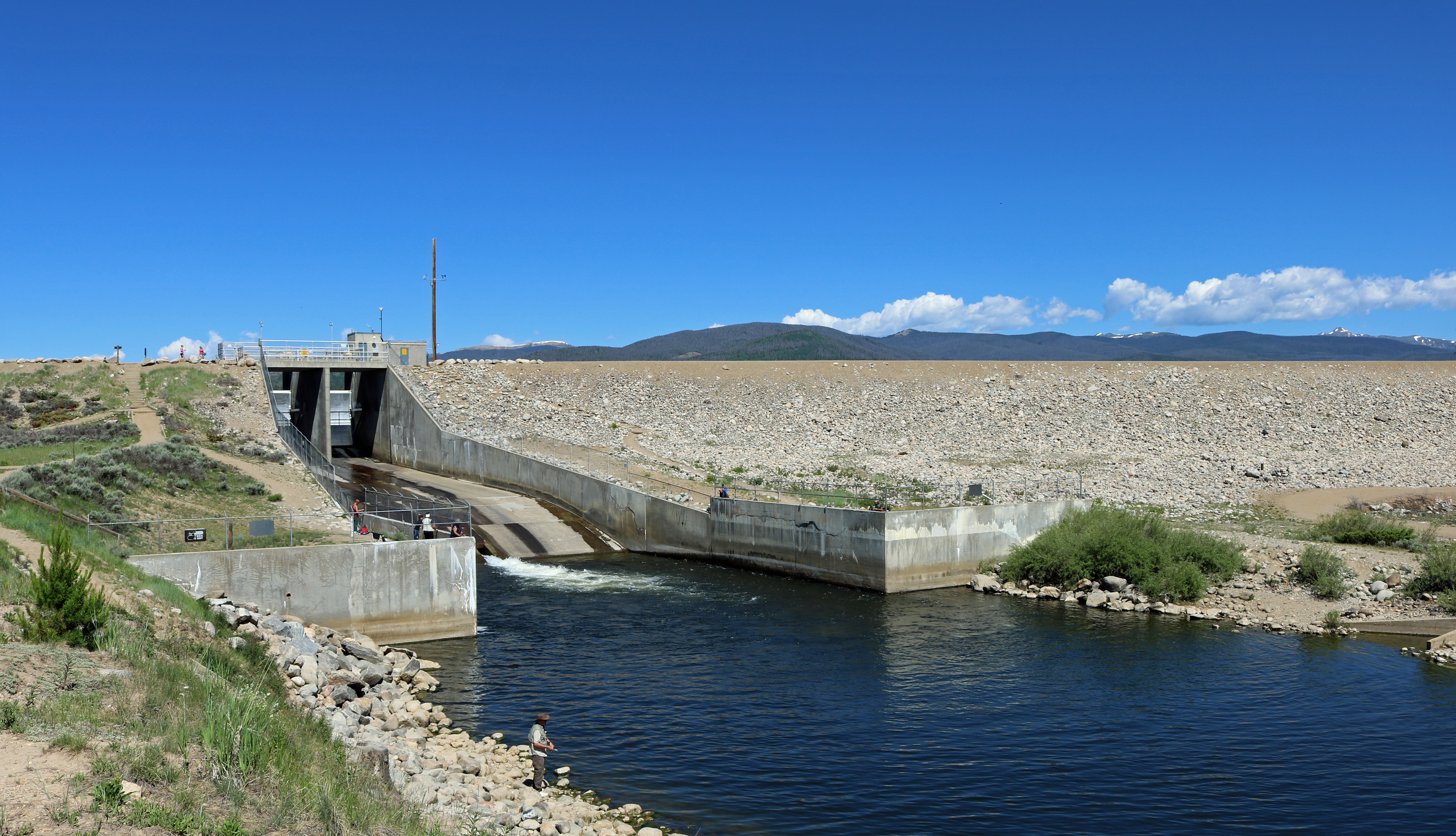
- The dam in 2016.

- Location within Colorado
- Location: Grand County, near Granby, Colorado, USA
- Coordinates: 40°12′25″N 105°50′27″W
- Construction began: 1944; 82 years ago
- Opening date: 1946; 80 years ago
- Operator: U.S. Bureau of Reclamation

Dam and spillways
- Type of dam: Zoned earth-fill
- Impounds: Colorado River
- Height: 63 ft (19 m)
- Length: 3,077 ft (938 m)
- Spillway capacity: 10,000 cu ft/s (280 m^{3}/s)

Reservoir
- Creates: Shadow Mountain Lake
- Total capacity: 18,400 acre-feet (0.0227 km^{3})
- Catchment area: 187 sq mi (480 km^{2})

Power Station
- Hydraulic head: 37 ft (11 m)
- Website https://www.usbr.gov/projects/index.php?id=235

Shadow Mountain Dam is a zoned earth-fill dam on the Colorado River in Grand County, Colorado. Constructed between 1944 and 1946, the Shadow Mountain Dam creates the Shadow Mountain Lake, with a structural height of 63 feet (19 m) and a drainage area of 187 square miles (480 km^{2}). Shadow Mountain Lake is a holding reservoir for water pumped up from Lake Granby just to the south through the Granby Pumping Plant and Canal. Shadow Mountain Lake is connected by a short channel to the natural Grand Lake. The west portal of the Alva B. Adams Tunnel is located on Grand Lake. The Adams Tunnel diverts west slope water to the east slope of the Rocky Mountains for use in agriculture and to serve the populated areas of Colorado, including Denver.
