= Grand Lake Yacht Club =

Coordinates: 40.250095°N 105.817055°W

- Short name: GLYC
- Founded: 1902
- Location: Grand County, Colorado
- Website: www.grandlakeyachtclub.com

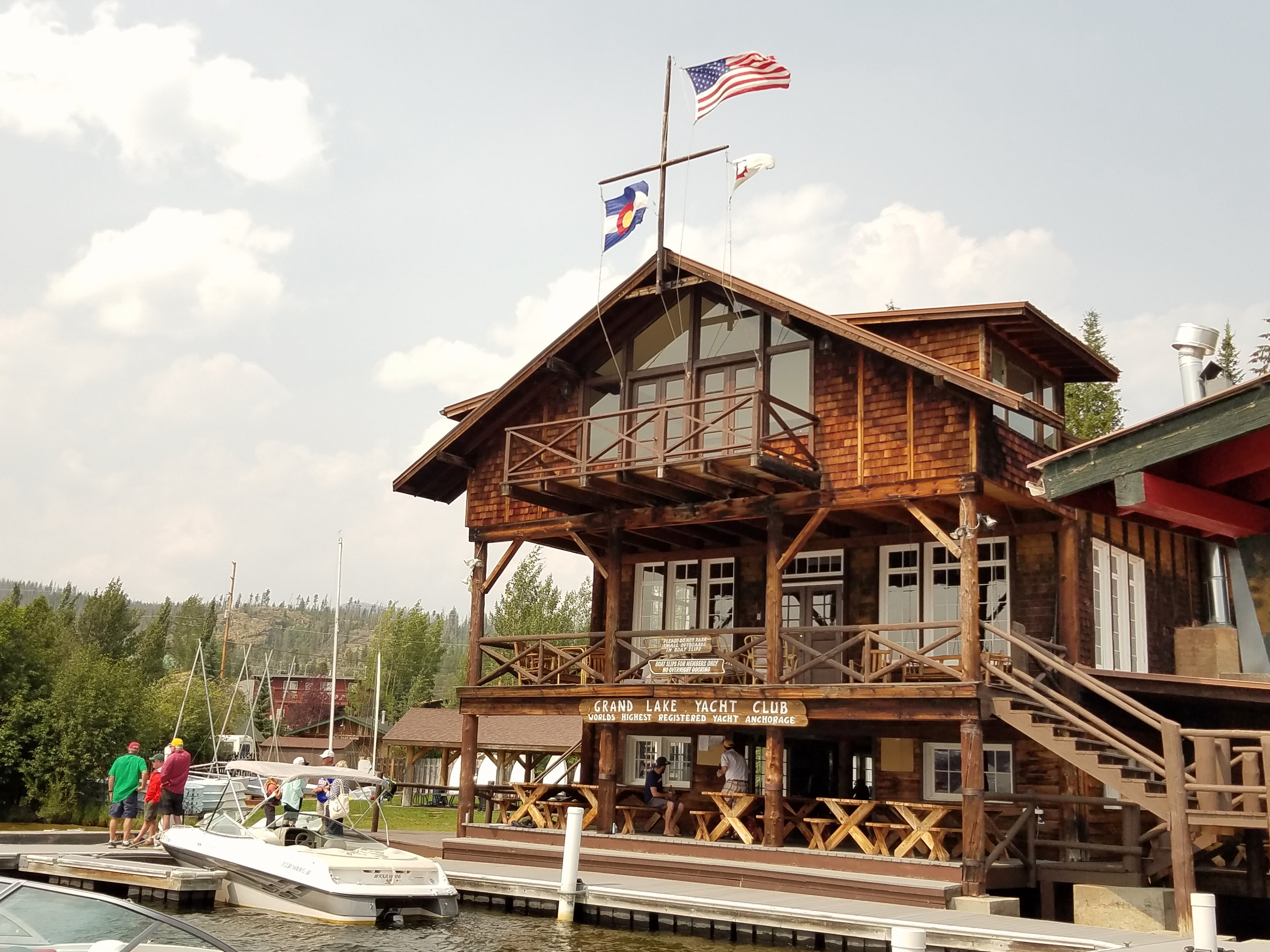
Marina entrance of the Grand Lake Yacht Club

Grand Lake Yacht Club or GLYC has been claimed to be the world's highest registered yacht club. Located at 8,269 feet (2,520 m) in elevation, on Grand Lake, it serves the town of Grand Lake, Colorado as a private club. Beginning in 1902 by entrepreneurs from Denver, it soon grew to its current location on Grand Lake's northern shore.

The clubhouse is three floors serving the needs of the sailing school, sailing meetings and a place to eat. GLYC hosts an annual Regatta Week where E Scows, M-20, M-16, M-17 and Laser sailboats race for a plethora of cups. In Regatta Week, the members also compete in several other competitions including wakeboarding, water skiing, and swimming races. On the last day of Regatta Week, the members go to the Commodore's Ball where they celebrate the good year at Grand Lake.

Most of the members have houses on the lake with boathouses and several types of boats. Because of the Lodgepole Pine epidemic, Grand Lake's shores have become more and more barren due to the removal of the dead trees. GLYC is a great place to learn how to sail and to become acquainted with Grand Lake's elite.

Denver architect Aaron Gove, who had a house in the area, was recruited to design a clubhouse, and did so for no fee.

The Lake Granby Yacht Club, at 8,280 feet (2,520 m) on nearby Lake Granby (reservoir created in 1950), claims to be higher.
