= Alva B. Adams Tunnel =

Colorado Western Slope water transfer tunnel to Front Range

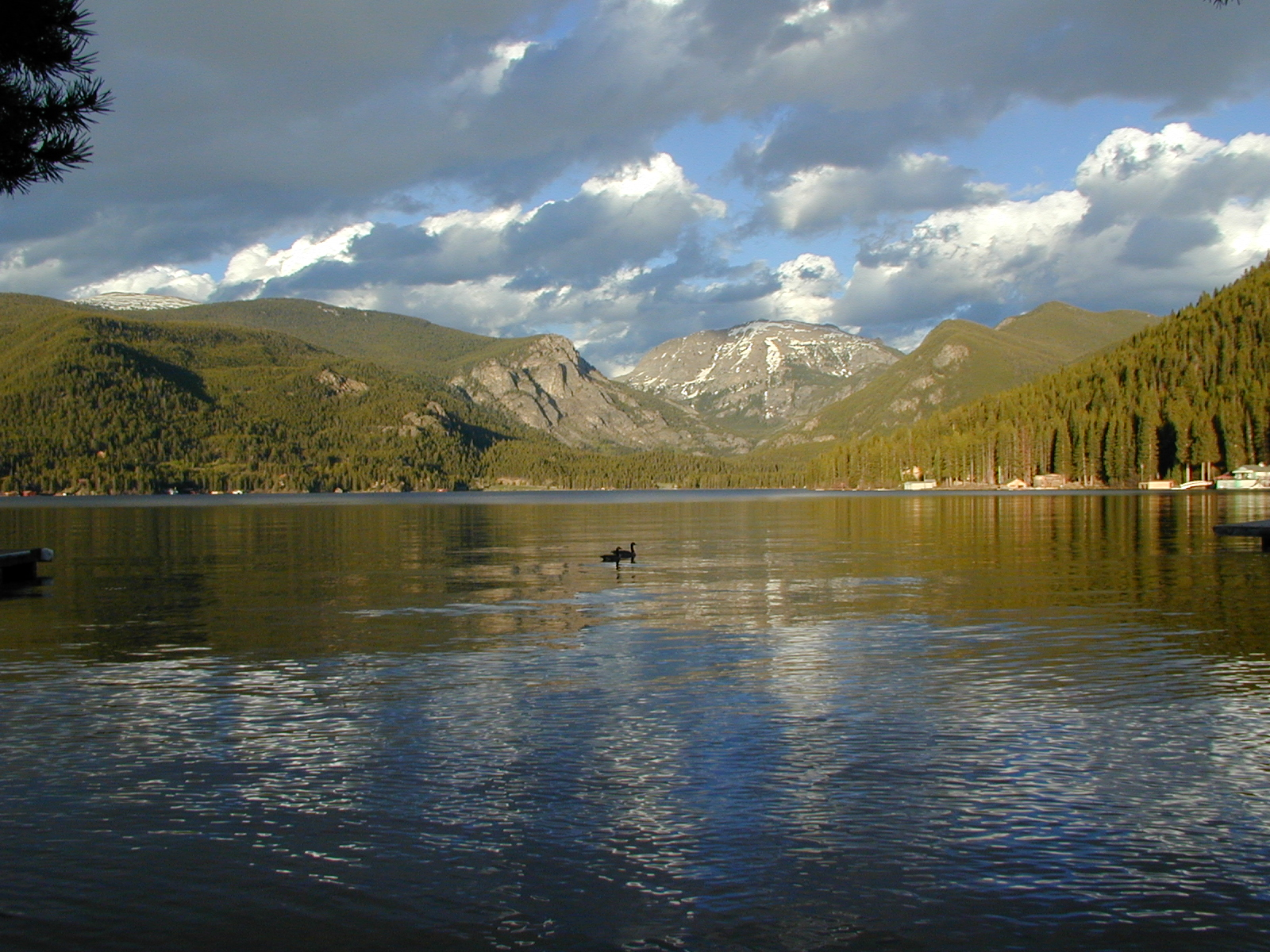
- Grand Lake west end Alva B. Adams Tunnel

Overview
- Location: Under Rocky Mountain National Park Colorado
- Coordinates: Grand Lake: 40.247302°N 105.810013°W; Mary's Lake exit: 40.346381°N 105.535269°W
- Status: Active
- System: Colorado- Big Thompson Project
- Start: Grand Lake (Colorado)
- End: Mary's Lake Colorado

Operation
- Opened: 1947
- Owner: Bureau of Reclamation
- Character: water tunnel

Technical
- Length: 13.1 miles (21.1 km) long
- Tunnel clearance: 9.75 feet (2.97 m) diameter

The Alva B. Adams Tunnel is the principal component of the largest transmountain water project in Colorado, the Colorado-Big Thompson Project (C-BT). The tunnel transfers water from the western slope of the Colorado River drainage to the eastern Front Range of Colorado. It is 13.1 miles (21.1 km) long, with a concrete lined diameter of 9.75 feet (2.97 m). The tunnel drops 109 feet (33 m) in elevation along its length and runs in a straight line under the Continental Divide from west to east, passing under Otis Peak in Rocky Mountain National Park. At its deepest point, the tunnel is about 3,800 feet (1,200 m) below the surface of the mountain peaks. Construction began on 15 June 1940, but was suspended as a result of World War II priorities, from the end of 1942 to August 1943. The tunnel was holed through on 31 March 1944, an event that was broadcast throughout the United States by NBC Radio. The tunnel was posthumously named for its chief advocate, US Senator Alva B. Adams.

West of the Continental Divide, the input of the tunnel is water pumped from Windy Gap Reservoir, Willow Creek Reservoir and other North Fork of the Colorado River drainages to Lake Granby. From Lake Granby, the water is pumped into Shadow Mountain reservoir and then flows by gravity to Grand Lake, Colorado's largest natural body of water, from where it pours through the tunnel. Lake Granby is the second largest reservoir in the state of Colorado, with a nominal capacity of 470,000 acre-feet (0.58 km^{3}). Once the water reaches the Front Range on the eastern side of the Rocky Mountains, it is used to generate electricity as it falls almost half a mile (0.8 km) through five power plants on its way down the Front Range. To get the power from the Front Range power plants back to the pumps on the western slope, a 5-inch (13 cm) diameter watertight nitrogen-filled conduit carrying a 69,000 volt electric power transmission line is mounted on the roof of the tunnel. This power is used to run the pumps on the western side of the tunnel, while surplus power is sold. West slope water is stored on the Front Range in Mary's Lake, Lake Estes, Carter Lake (all reservoirs), Flatiron Reservoir, Horsetooth Reservoir and Boulder Reservoir for power generation or release after the peak snow melt months of May to July.

The tunnel is capable of carrying a water flowrate of 550 cubic feet per second (16 m^{3}/s). An average annual total of 213,000 acre-feet (0.263 km^{3}) of water is transported through the tunnel each year. The tunnel can transport as much as 1,100 acre-feet (1,400,000 m^{3}) in one day. The water transferred through the tunnel is considered part of Colorado's Colorado River water allocation of 3,880,000 acre-feet (4.79 km^{3}) per year as agreed to in the Colorado River Compact.

Entrance (West Portal, Underwater) 40.241200°N 105.802450°W
Exit (East Portal) 40.326817°N 105.581991°W
