= Gove & Walsh =

Architectural firm based in Denver, Colorado

Gove & Walsh was an architectural firm based in Denver, Colorado which operated from 1896 to 1918. Aaron M. Gove (July 12, 1867 – February 29, 1924) and Thomas F. Walsh were partners. A number of its works are listed on the National Register of Historic Places.

== Works ==
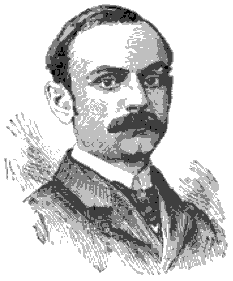
Aaron M. Gove

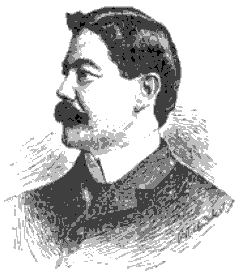
Thomas F. Walsh

Works (with attribution to either principal or to the firm) include:

- J.S. Brown Mercantile Building, 1634 18th St., Denver, (Gove & Walsh), NRHP-listed
- Cathedral of the Immaculate Conception, NE corner of Colfax Ave. and Logan St., Denver, (Gove & Walsh), NRHP-listed
- Littleton Creamery-Beatrice Foods Cold Storage Warehouse, 1801 Wynkoop St., Denver, (Gove & Walsh), NRHP-listed
- Peters Paper Company Warehouse, 1625–1631 Wazee St., Denver, (Aaron Gove and Thomas Walsh), NRHP-listed
- Sugar Building, 1530 16th St., (Gove & Walsh), NRHP-listed
- 17 buildings of the Agnes Phipps Memorial Sanatorium, a tuberculosis hospital built on land of Lowry Field, which later became the Lowry Air Force Base. The buildings were renovated in 1937 to become an air force technical school as part of one of the largest Works Progress Administration projects in Colorado.
- At the military school site the Agnes Phipps Memorial Sanatorium was established as a tuberculosis hospital in 1904 at 520 Rampart Way.
- For no fee, but a membership, Gove designed the clubhouse of the Grand Lake Yacht Club in Grand Lake, Colorado, which is believed to be the highest-in-elevation yacht club in the world.
