= Granby Dam =

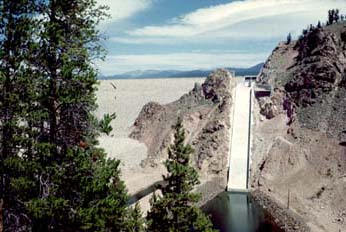

- Location within Colorado
- Location: Grand County, near Granby, Colorado, USA
- Coordinates: 40°08′53″N 105°52′03″W
- Construction began: 1941
- Opening date: 1950
- Owner: United States Bureau of Reclamation
- Operators: United States Bureau of Reclamation and Northern Water

Dam and spillways
- Type of dam: Earthfill
- Impounds: Colorado River
- Height: 298 ft (91 m)
- Length: Dam 861 ft (262 m), dikes 12,722 ft (3,878 m)
- Dam volume: Dam 2,974,000 cu yd (2,274,000 m^{3}), dikes 1,739,000 cu yd (1,330,000 m^{3})
- Spillway capacity: 11,500 cu ft/s (330 m^{3}/s)

Reservoir
- Creates: Lake Granby
- Total capacity: 539,800 acre-feet (0.6658 km^{3})
- Catchment area: 311 sq mi (810 km^{2})

Power Station
- Hydraulic head: 223 ft (68 m)
- Website https://www.usbr.gov/projects/index.php?id=291

Granby Dam (National ID # CO01656) is an earthfill dam that dams the Colorado River 5.5 miles (8.9 km) northeast of Granby, Colorado in Grand County, Colorado. This 298-foot-tall (91 m) dam was constructed between 1941 and 1950 and has a drainage area of 311 square miles (810 km^{2}). The Granby Dam's reservoir is known as Lake Granby, the largest reservoir component of the Colorado-Big Thompson Project. Lake Granby stores Colorado River water that is diverted under the Continental Divide for agriculture and municipal use within north-eastern Colorado including the cities of Boulder, Fort Collins, Loveland, and Greeley. In addition to the waters of the Colorado, water from Willow Creek just below the dam is pumped up 175 feet (53 m) to Lake Granby. Water from Lake Granby is pumped 125 feet (38 m) higher by the Granby Pumping Plant to the Granby Pump Canal, which extents 1.8 miles (2.9 km) to Shadow Mountain Lake, from which water is diverted through the Alva B. Adams Tunnel to the East Slope.

This damsite does not generate any power directly; power is generated at other locations in the Colorado-Big Thompson Project.

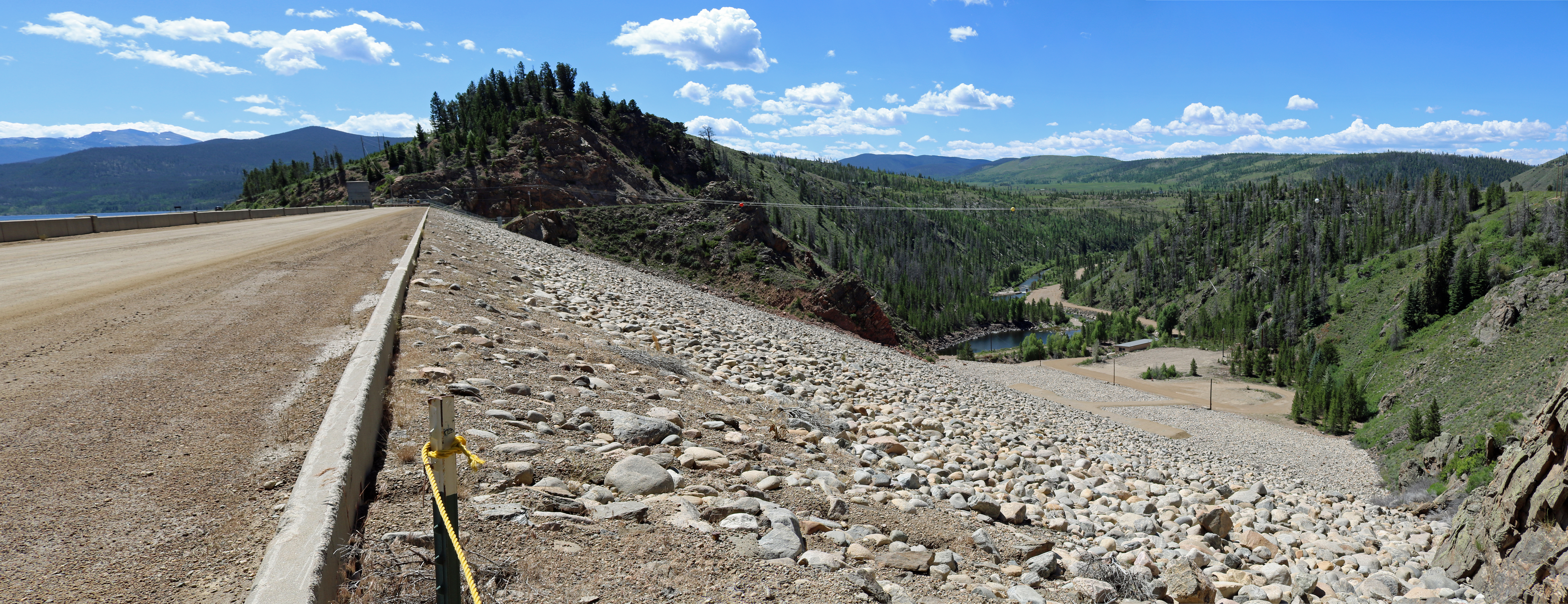
A view from the road that goes over the top of the dam.
