= Peters Paper Company Warehouse =

- U.S. National Register of Historic Places
- Colorado State Register of Historic Properties
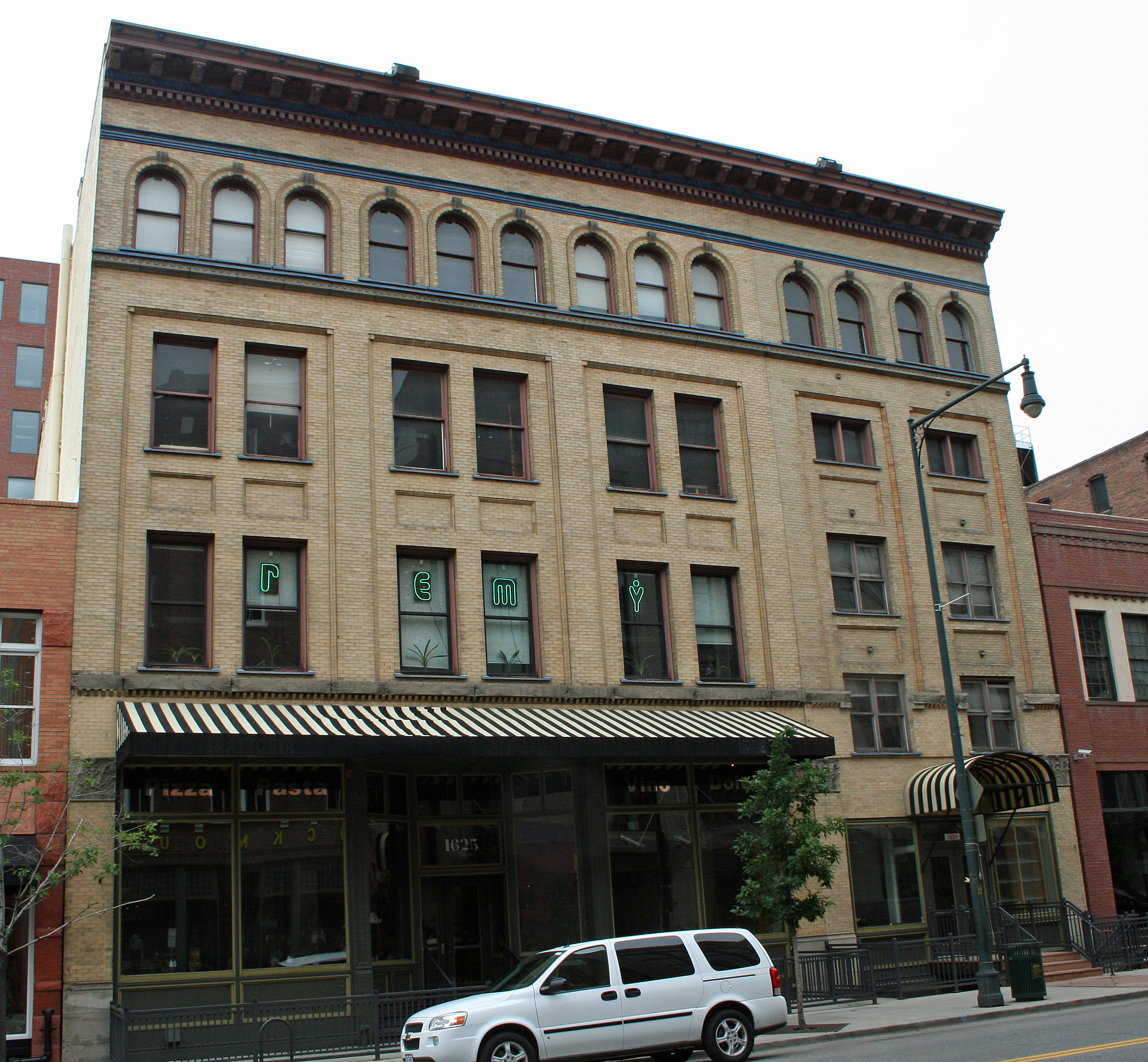
- The front elevation in 2009.

- Location within Colorado Location within the United States
- Location: 1625--1631 Wazee St., Denver, Colorado
- Coordinates: 39°45′6″N 104°59′56″W
- Area: less than one acre
- Built: 1899
- Architect: Gove, Aaron; Walsh, Thomas
- Architectural style: Chicago, Commercial Style
- NRHP reference No.: 88000757
- CSRHP No.: 5DV.2853
- Added to NRHP: June 16, 1988

The Peters Paper Company Warehouse, in Denver, Colorado, has been listed on the National Register of Historic Places since 1988. It was built in 1899, expanded in 1915, and served as a paper company warehouse until 1942.

It is a four- and five-story building with a post and beam structural system and with facing of beige brick. It has a pressed metal cornice and a flat roof. The original part, built in 1899, is four stories, and fills two lots. A 1915 addition on a third lot on the north side has five stories but is the same height, and is tied in by the cornice and by windows having the same design. The construction of both parts was designed and/or supervised by architects Gove and Walsh.
