= Northern Colorado Water Conservancy District =

Northern Colorado water utility

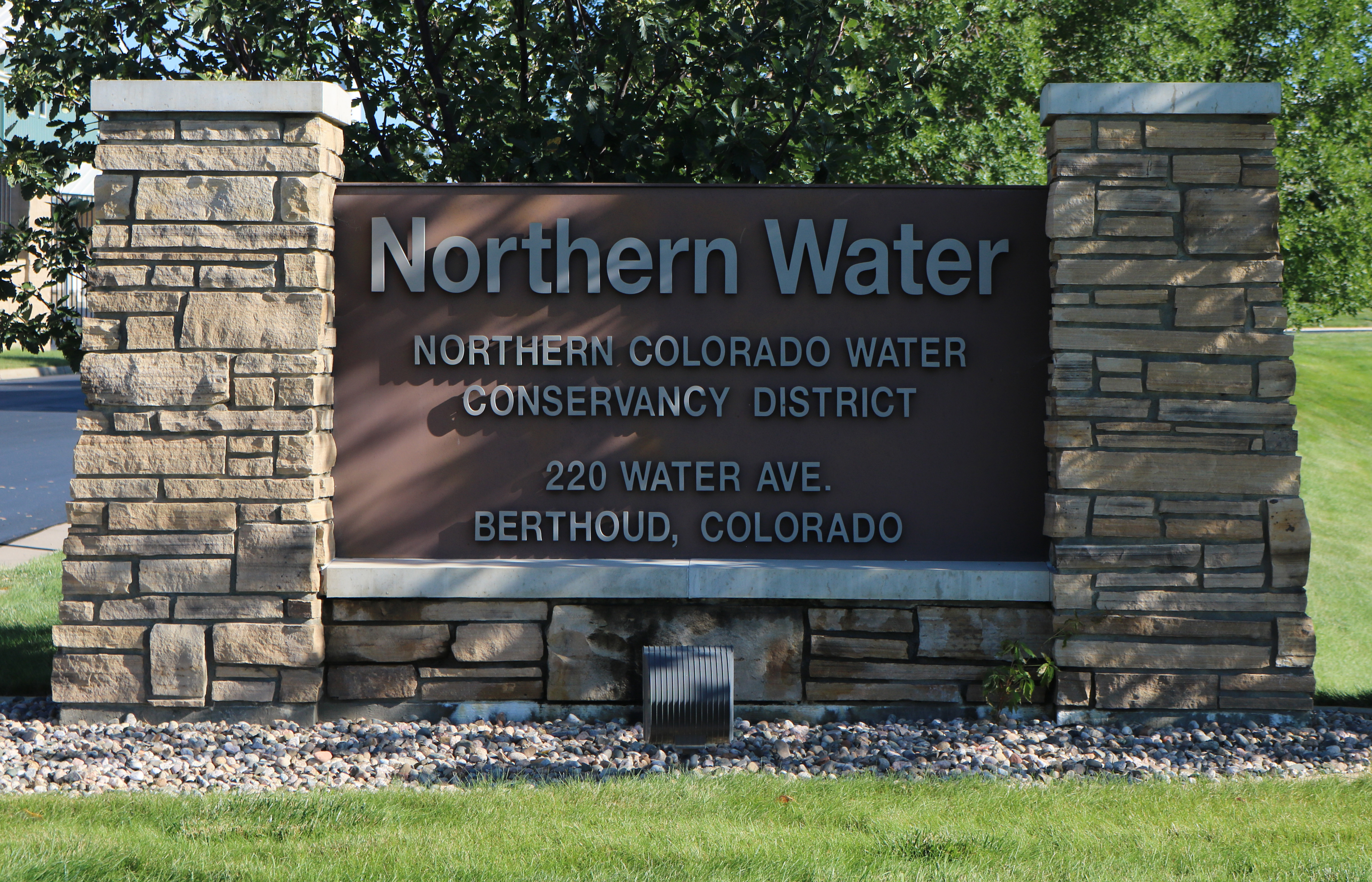
- Headquarters in Berthoud.

Water utility overview
- Formed: 1937
- Jurisdiction: Government of Colorado
- Headquarters: 220 Water Avenue, Berthoud, Colorado 80513; 40°19′19″N 105°4′32″W
- Employees: 170
- Annual budget: $204,849,800 USD (2023)
- Water utility executive: Bradley D. Wind, General Manager
- Child Water utility: Municipal Subdistrict

The Northern Colorado Water Conservancy District — more commonly referred to as Northern Water — is a water utility for eight counties in northeastern Colorado. Northern Water works with the Colorado-Big Thompson Project to transfer water from the Colorado Western Slope over the Continental Divide for agricultural, industrial, and municipal water supply in northeastern Colorado. The District's offices are in Berthoud, Colorado.

== Water supply infrastructure ==
Northern Water manages numerous water infrastructure projects, including reservoirs, pipelines and tunnels, dams, hydroelectric plants, and feeder canals. For example, the Alva B. Adams Tunnel brings water from the Upper Colorado River basin across the mountains to the South Platte River watershed in northern Colorado. Also, Horsetooth Reservoir, west of Fort Collins is among the more well-known reservoirs Northern Water manages.

== Northern Integrated Supply Project ==
The Northern Integrated Supply Project is a project managed by Northern Water which proposes to build two new reservoirs in Northern Colorado. The proposed Glade Reservoir will take and store water from the Cache la Poudre River, and the proposed Galeton Reservoir will pull water from the South Platte River. However, the project faces organized opposition.

== Chimney Hollow Reservoir Project ==
The Chimney Hollow Reservoir Project involves the construction of a new reservoir to store water collected from the Windy Gap Reservoir in Grand County, Colorado. The reservoir, the major component of the Windy Gap Firming Project, a subdivision of Northern Water, will help store water otherwise lost in wet years due to the insufficient capacity of the Windy Gap Reservoir and other reservoirs on Colorado's Western Slope. The reservoir will store water from existing water rights. Construction on the reservoir's two dams (one on the north end and one on the south end) began in 2021, and water will begin flowing into it in 2025. Located just west of Carter Lake in southern Larmier County, the new reservoir will hold 90,000 acre-feet (110,000,000 cubic meters) of water, which will be used for municipal water supply for nine municipalities and three water districts on Colorado's Front Range. The $690 million project is the first major dam to be built in Colorado in twenty years. The larger of the two dams will be over 350 feet (110 meters) high. The reservoir's surface area will be 740 acres (300 hectares).

== Municipal Subdistrict ==
The Municipal Subdistrict, a subordinate organization of Northern Water, was formed on July 6, 1970. The subdistrict was set up to take advantage of some unallocated Colorado River water that could also be piped over the divide for the benefit of Northern Waters customers. The Windy Gap Project, as it came to be called, provided for the construction of a diversion dam near Granby in Grand County. Now the Windy Gap Reservoir is able to divert about 48,000 acre feet of water each year to users within Northern Water's service area.

== Board of Directors ==
The Northern Colorado Water Conservancy District directors represent eight counties in northeastern, Colorado.

Boulder: Todd Williams - Term ends: September 28, 2025

Washington and Morgan: John R. Rusch - Term Ends: September 28, 2025

Larimer: Bill Emslie - Term Ends: September 28, 2025

Broomfield: Dick Wolfe - Term Ends: September 28, 2025

Weld: Dave Nettles - Term Ends: September 28, 2026

Boulder: Sue Ellen Harrison - Term Ends: September 28, 2026

Logan: Gene Manuello - Term Ends: September 28, 2026

Larimer: Dave Stewart - Term Ends: September 28, 2027

Weld: Dale Trowbridge - Term Ends: September 28, 2027

Sedgwick: Rob McClary - Term Ends: September 28, 2027

Larimer: Jennifer Gimbel - Term Ends: September 28, 2028

Weld: Don Magnuson - Term Ends: September 28, 2028

Boulder: Dennis Yanchunas - Term Ends: September 28, 2028

== See also ==
- Colorado-Big Thompson Project
- Alva B. Adams Tunnel
- Horsetooth Reservoir
- Windy Gap Reservoir
- Water in Colorado
