= Colorado–Big Thompson Project =

Federal water diversion project

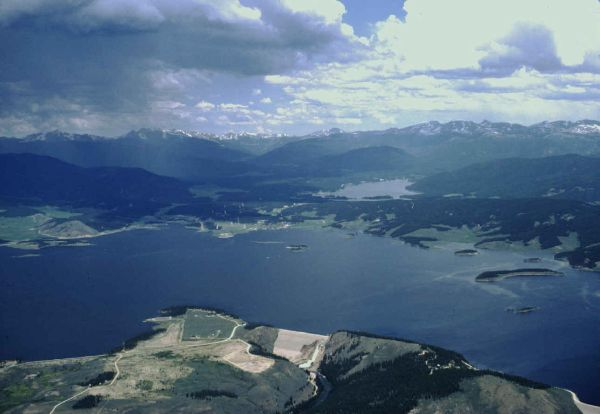
View of Lake Granby (front) and Shadow Mountain Lake, the primary West Slope reservoirs

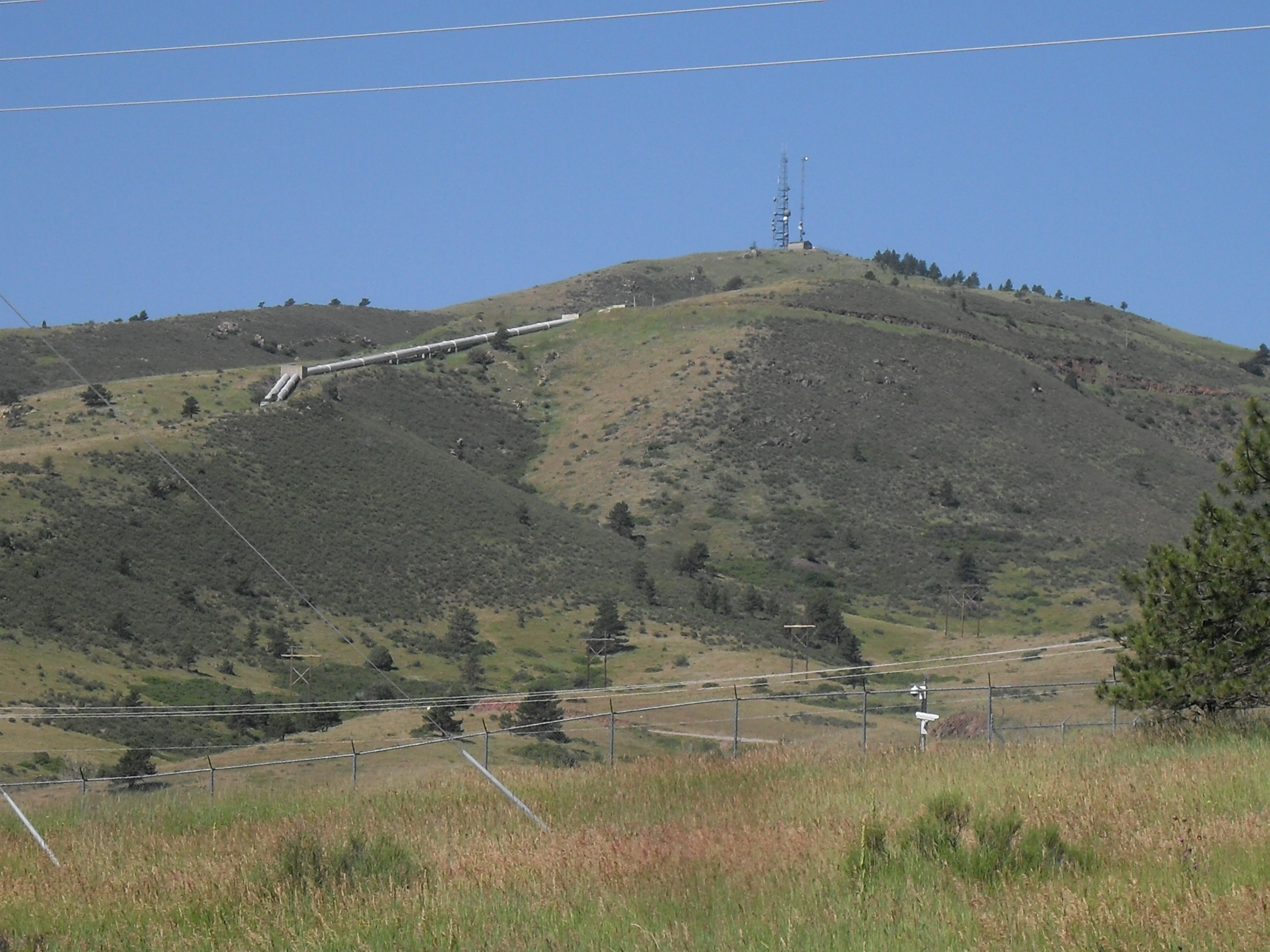
Waterpipes near Flatiron Reservoir in Larimer County

The Colorado–Big Thompson Project (abbreviated C-BT) is a federal water diversion project in Colorado designed to collect West Slope mountain water from the headwaters of the Colorado River and divert it to Colorado's Front Range and plains. In Colorado, approximately 80% of the state's precipitation falls on the West Slope, in the Rocky Mountains, while around 80% of the state's growing population lives along the eastern slope, between the cities of Fort Collins and Pueblo.

Eleven reservoirs, about 18 dams and dikes, the Alva B. Adams Tunnel under the Continental Divide, as well as six power plants, make up the project. The C-BT is owned and primarily managed by the U.S. Bureau of Reclamation's Eastern Colorado Area Office under its Great Plains Region.

== History ==
The project was built, is owned, and is primarily operated by the federal Bureau of Reclamation under the Department of the Interior. By the late 1890s, farmers in northeastern Colorado realized water rights in the area had become over-appropriated. In order to survive the agricultural season, additional water supplies would be needed. Prior to the Dust Bowl era, agriculture in this section of the state had relied upon sources such as Boulder Creek, St. Vrain Creek, Little Thompson River, Big Thompson River and the Cache La Poudre River, all of which are a part of the South Platte River basin and flow into the South Platte River before the South Platte reaches Greeley, Colorado. In search of a solution, farmers and their representatives approached the Bureau of Reclamation. In the late 1930s a solution was found: divert the water via a 13.2-mile-long (21.2 km) tunnel under the Continental Divide and Rocky Mountain National Park. (Tunnel West Portal 40°14′28.16″N 105°48′07.36″W, Tunnel East Portal 40°19′39.85″N 105°34′46.34″W)

The proposed water diversion was extensive and the project could not have been constructed without compensation to the West Slope for the water sent east. As a result, the first feature built on the C-BT was Green Mountain Dam and Reservoir, a West Slope facility designed to provide for future water demands in the state's Upper Colorado River Basin. The project was authorized by President Franklin Delano Roosevelt in 1937. Construction began on Green Mountain in the northern part of Summit County in 1938. Construction on the project continued through most of the next 20 years.

== Benefits ==
While the project was originally built for agricultural purposes, it serves multiple demands including municipal and industrial supply, hydro-power generation, recreation, and fish and wildlife. In recent years, however, water supply demands have shifted making municipal and industrial supply the main water beneficiary, rather than irrigation.

Today, the "C-BT" serves over 33 cities and towns in northeastern Colorado, including Fort Collins, Greeley, Loveland, Estes Park, Boulder, and Sterling, encompassed by seven counties, providing a secondary source of water for around 1 million people and an irrigated area of 640,000 acres (2,500 km^{2}). Although water rights allow for up to 310,000 acre-feet (380,000,000 m^{3}) of water a year to be diverted, annual diversions average around 220,000 acre-feet (270,000,000 m^{3}), instead. A drop of over 2000 vertical feet from the Rockies down to the plains allows for power generation. Seven power plants on the project produce an average supply of 759 million kilowatt hours of electricity a year. Like the water supply, generated electricity is supplemental. Electricity produced on the C-BT is a source of "peaking power" and is marketed by the Department of Energy via its Western Area Power Administration.

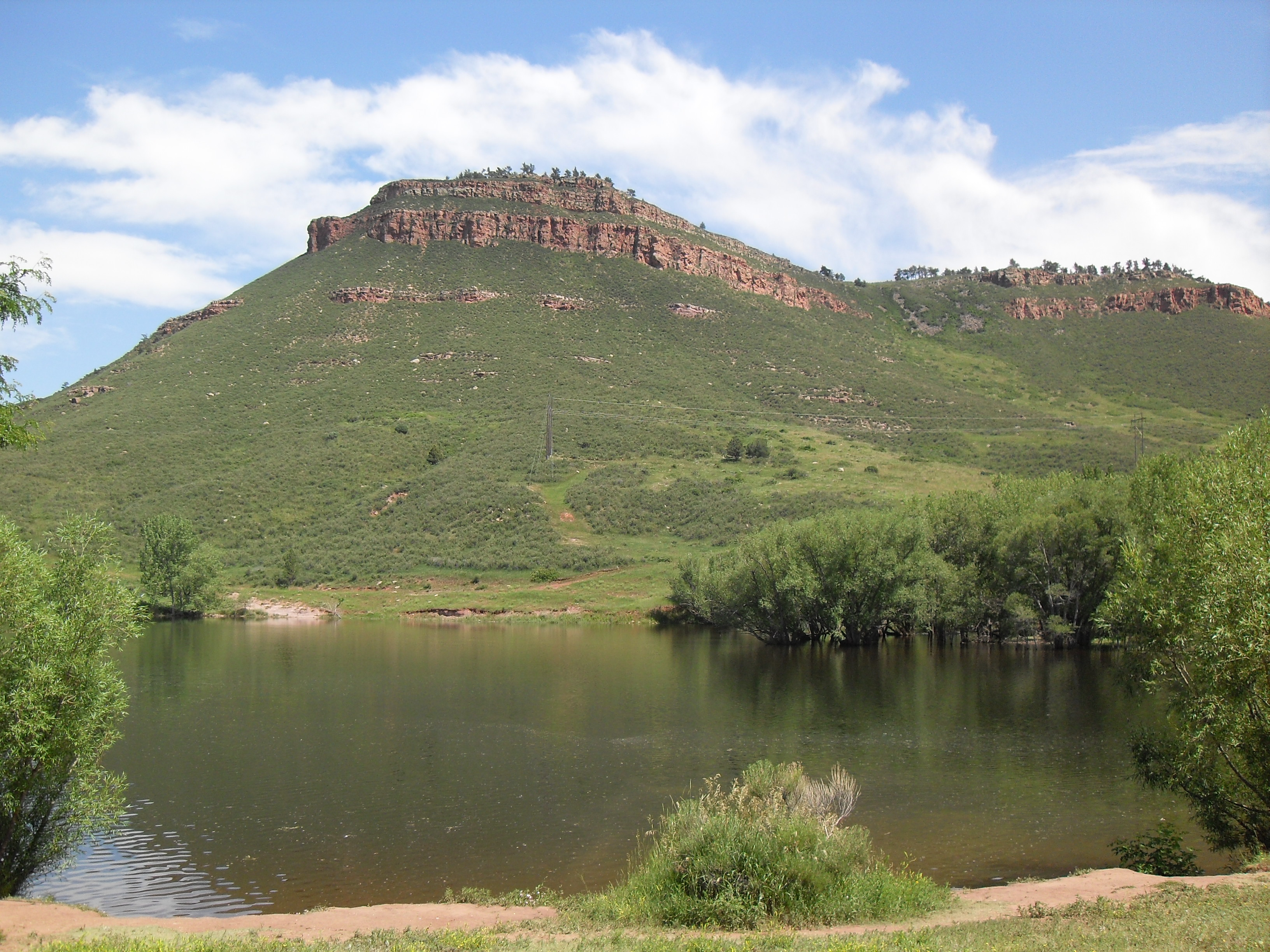
Flatiron reservoir near Carter Lake in Larimer County

== Project features ==
=== West-slope collection system ===
An extensive series of reservoirs, pumps and conduits on the west side of the Rockies serve to collect water from the headwaters of the Colorado River, as well as two tributaries, Cottonwood Creek and the Fraser River. Lake Granby, located in eastern Grand County, is the primary C-BT storage facility, with a capacity of 539,800 acre-feet (0.6658 km^{3}). The reservoir is held by the 298-foot (91 m) high Granby Dam and 12,722 feet (3,878 m) of auxiliary dikes.

Willow Creek Reservoir is built on Willow Creek, which is located west of Lake Granby, and provides a source from which water is diverted and pumped to Granby. Windy Gap Reservoir is a small diversion facility located directly below the confluence of the Colorado and Fraser rivers, about 5 miles (8.0 km) downstream of Granby. Water from the Fraser River, as well as other inflows to the Colorado below Granby Dam, is diverted here and pumped eastwards to Lake Granby. The Windy Gap project is not owned by the Bureau of Reclamation, but by the Municipal Subdistrict, a consortium of 14 Front Range cities, water providers and an electric utility. However, Windy Gap water uses the storage and distribution facilities of the Bureau of Reclamation's C-BT.

From Lake Granby the water is lifted 125 feet (38 m) up to Shadow Mountain Lake, which is located on the Colorado River west of the natural Grand Lake. The two bodies of water are connected by a short channel which allows water to flow freely to the intake of the Alva B. Adams Tunnel on Grand Lake's eastern shore. The water then flows 13.2 miles (21.2 km) under the Continental Divide through the Adams Tunnel, which can carry up to 550 cubic feet per second (16 m^{3}/s) to the eastern slope.

=== East-slope hydroelectric system ===
Once the water emerges from the Adams Tunnel just southwest of Estes Park, the system is almost entirely gravity powered, dropping some 2,800 feet (850 m) as it descends to the foothills of the Rocky Mountains west of Loveland. The tunnel outlet is located at East Portal Reservoir, a small regulating pool on the Wind River. From here it is transported via an inverted siphon across the Aspen Creek valley and drops 205 feet (62 m) to Mary’s Lake, where it drives the 8.1 megawatt (MW) Mary’s Lake Powerplant. Mary’s Lake is a small natural lake enlarged to form a second regulatory reservoir. The water then drops 515 feet (157 m) to the 45-MW Estes Powerplant at Lake Estes, which is formed by Olympus Dam on the Big Thompson River at Estes Park. With its small storage capacity, Lake Estes provides limited regulation of both C-BT water and the natural flows of the Big Thompson River, including diversion of some Big Thompson River water for non-consumptive use in hydroelectric power generation.

From Lake Estes the water travels east via the Olympus and Pole Hill Tunnels to the 38.2 MW Pole Hill Powerplant, where it drops 825 feet (251 m), and flows via the shorter Rattlesnake Tunnel to Pinewood Lake. The water then enters the Bald Mountain Tunnel, heading east to a final drop of 1,055 feet (322 m) at 94.5 MW Flatiron Powerplant. From the tailrace of the powerplant the water enters Flatiron Reservoir from which the water is distributed to the eastern slope, including returning native hydropower water to the river at the mouth of the Big Thompson Canyon.

=== Foothill distribution facilities ===
Once the water reaches Flatiron Reservoir, it splits into two branches which distribute water to about 50 miles (80 km) of the Front Range Corridor, from Fort Collins to near Denver. The northern branch consists of the Horsetooth Feeder Canal and tunnels which feeds water by gravity to Horsetooth Reservoir. The reservoir is formed by four dams in the hills west of Fort Collins and has a total capacity of 151,750 acre-feet (0.18718 km^{3}). The northern end of the reservoir outlets into the Charles Hansen Supply Canal, which mainly supplies agriculture in the Cache la Poudre River valley. There is a smaller outlet at Soldier Canyon which provides water to the Fort Collins area.

Water flowing into the southern branch must be pumped into Carter Lake Reservoir, located west of Berthoud. The reservoir can hold up to 112,230 acre-feet (0.13843 km^{3}) of water. During times of peak power demand, water can be released back from Carter into Flatiron via a pump-generating unit. Water flows south from Carter Lake into the St. Vrain Supply Canal, which provides water to the Little Thompson River and Saint Vrain Creek. From the end of the St. Vrain Canal the Boulder Creek Supply Canal extends southward to Boulder Creek, and the South Platte Supply Canal extends northeast from there to the South Platte River.

== See also ==
- The Grand Ditch, an 1890s diversion project
- List of largest reservoirs of Colorado
