= Carter Lake Dam =

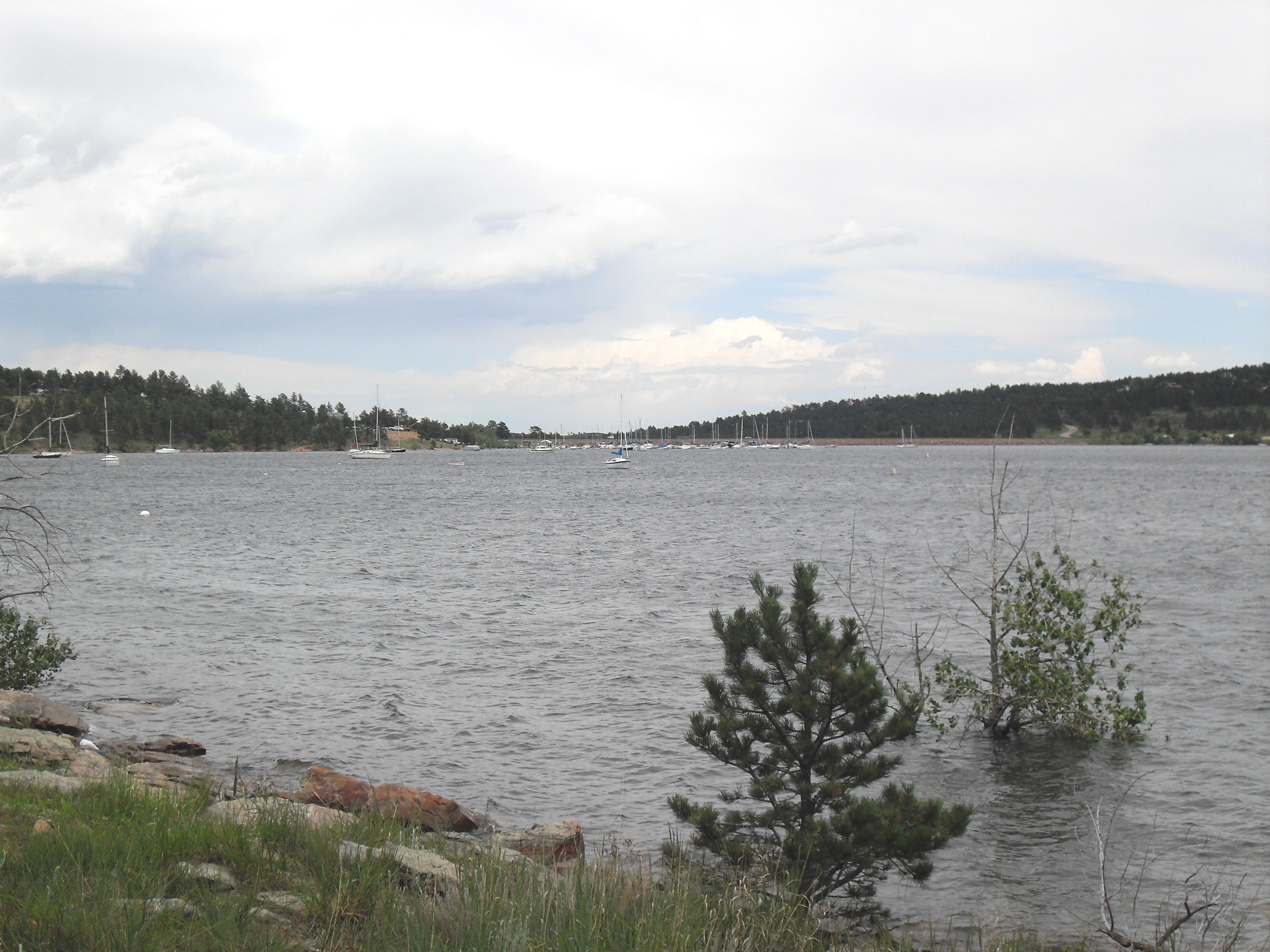
- Carter Lake

- Location within Colorado Location within the United States
- Location: Larimer County, Colorado, U.S.
- Coordinates: 40°19′32″N 105°12′44″W
- Purpose: flood control, irrigation
- Status: Operational
- Opening date: 1950 (76 years ago)
- Owner: U.S. Bureau of Reclamation
- Operator: Northern Colorado Water Conservancy District

Dam and spillways
- Type of dam: Earthen
- Height: 214 ft (65 m)
- Length: 1,235 ft (376 m)

Reservoir
- Creates: Carter Lake
- Total capacity: 112,230 acre⋅ft (0.13843 km^{3})
- Surface area: 900 acres (3.6 km^{2})
- Normal elevation: 1,756 m (5,761 ft)

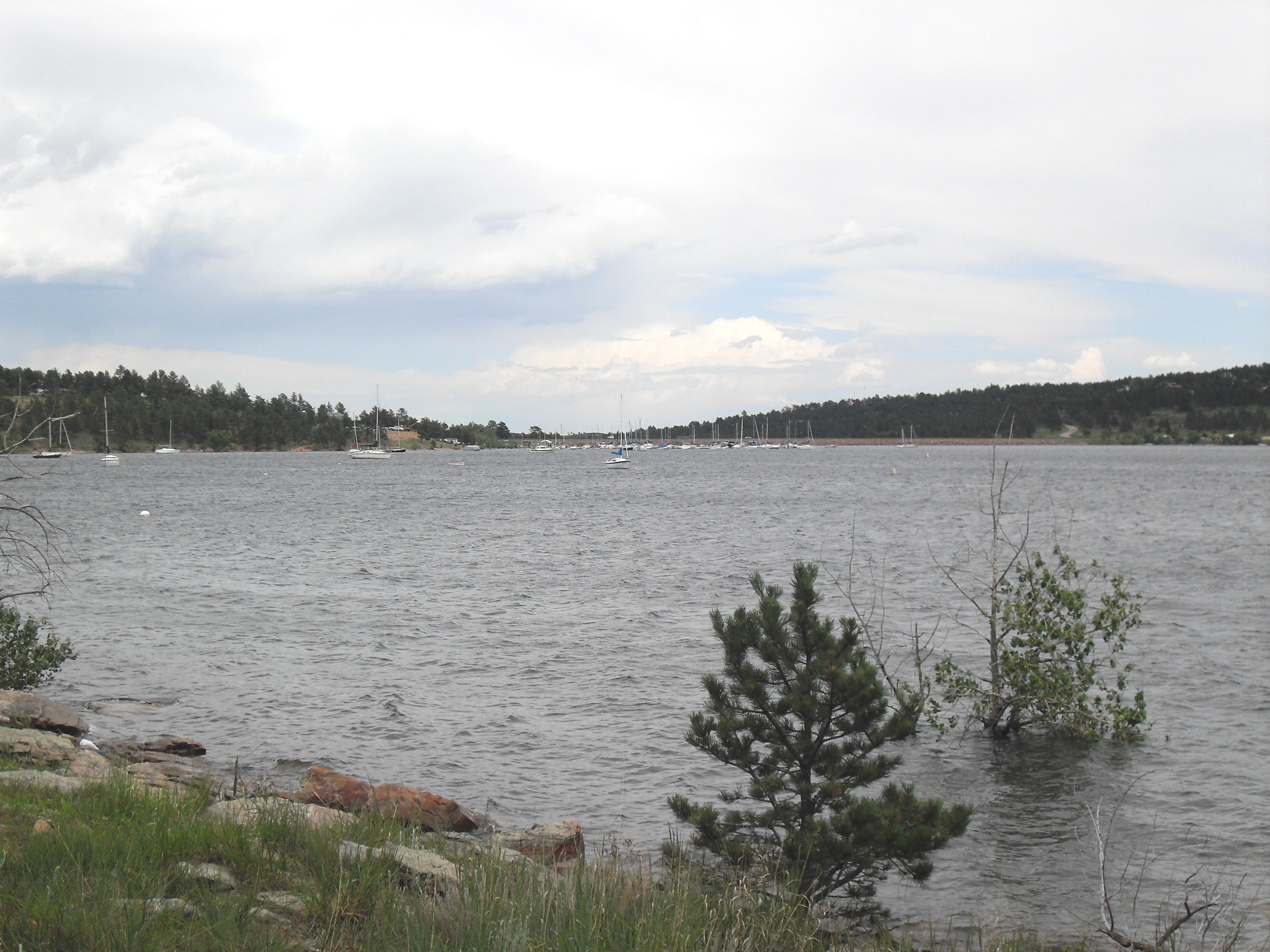
Carter Lake

Carter Lake Dam (National ID # CO01650) is a dam in Larimer County, Colorado.

The earthen dam was completed in 1950 by the United States Bureau of Reclamation, with a height of 214 feet (65 m), and a length of 1,235 feet (376 m) at its crest. It contains offstream storage as part of the Bureau of Reclamation's Colorado-Big Thompson Project for flood control and irrigation. The dam is owned by the Bureau of Reclamation and operated by the Northern Colorado Water Conservancy District.

The reservoir it creates, Carter Lake Reservoir, has a water surface of 1,100 acres (450 ha), about eight miles of shoreline, more than 900 acres (360 ha) of surrounding public land, and a capacity of 112,230 acre-feet (138,430,000 m^{3}). Recreation includes fishing (for rainbow trout, kokanee, brown trout, splake, walleye, yellow perch, bluegill, salmon, largemouth bass, etc.), hunting, boating, camping and hiking.

== Recreation ==
Carter Lake Reservoir has many activities, such as swimming , paddle boarding and boating, as well as fishing and waterskiing. Cliff diving is not allowed.

== See also ==
- List of dams and reservoirs in Colorado
- List of largest reservoirs of Colorado
