= Shadow Mountain Lake =

Reservoir in Colorado, United States

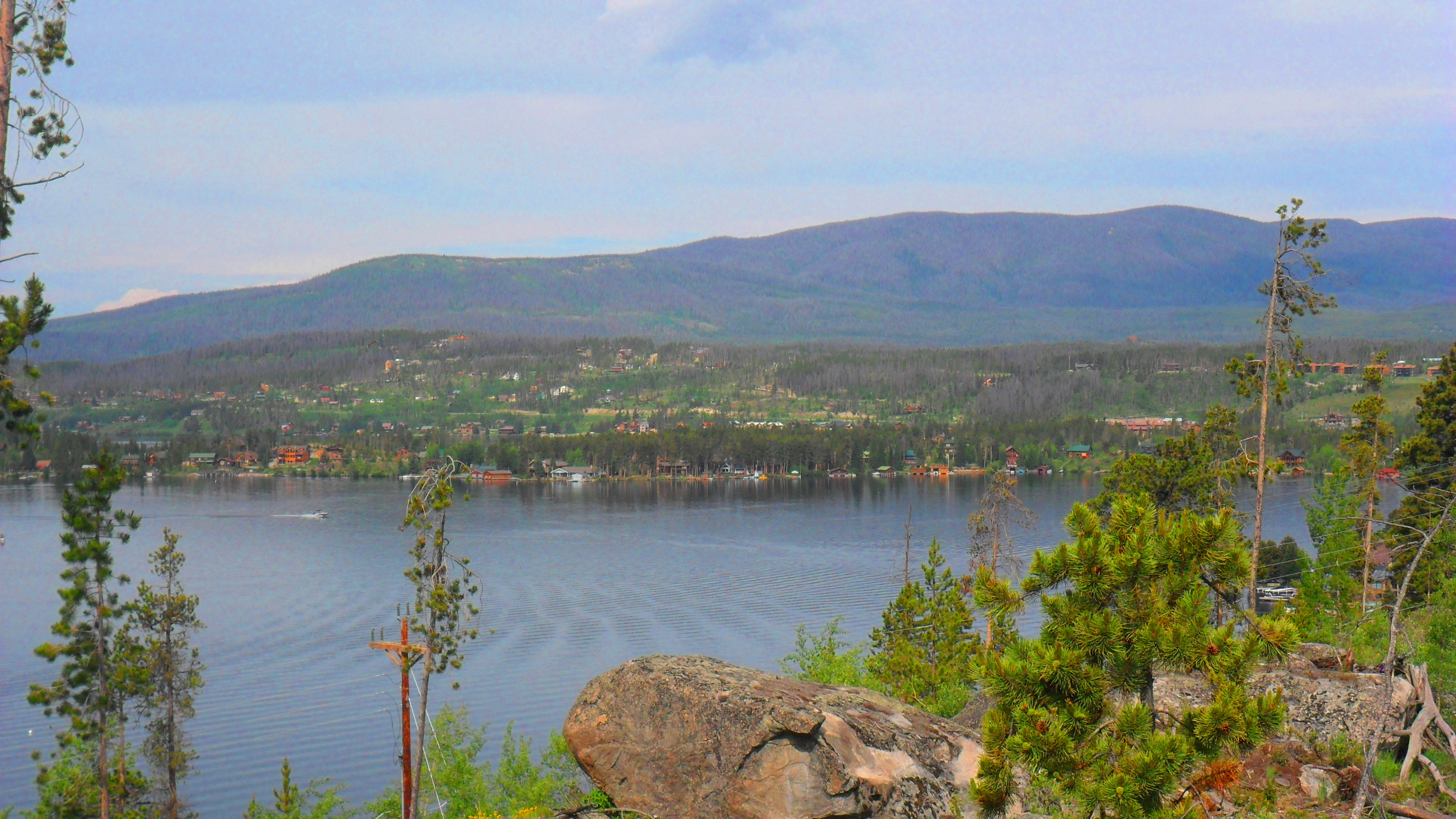
- Shadow Mountain Lake looking West

- Location within Colorado Location within the United States
- Location: Grand County, Colorado, United States
- Coordinates: 40°13′40″N 105°50′35″W
- Basin countries: United States
- Surface area: 1,346 acres (545 ha)
- Water volume: 16,848 acre-feet (20.782×10^{6} m^{3})
- Surface elevation: 2,550 m (8,366 ft)
- Settlements: Grand Lake

Shadow Mountain Lake is a reservoir in Grand County, Colorado, near the headwaters of the Colorado River. Shadow Mountain Lake is created by Shadow Mountain Dam. The lake forms a continuous body of water with Grand Lake, the largest natural lake in Colorado; they are separated by gates.

Shadow Mountain Lake is part of Arapaho National Recreation Area.

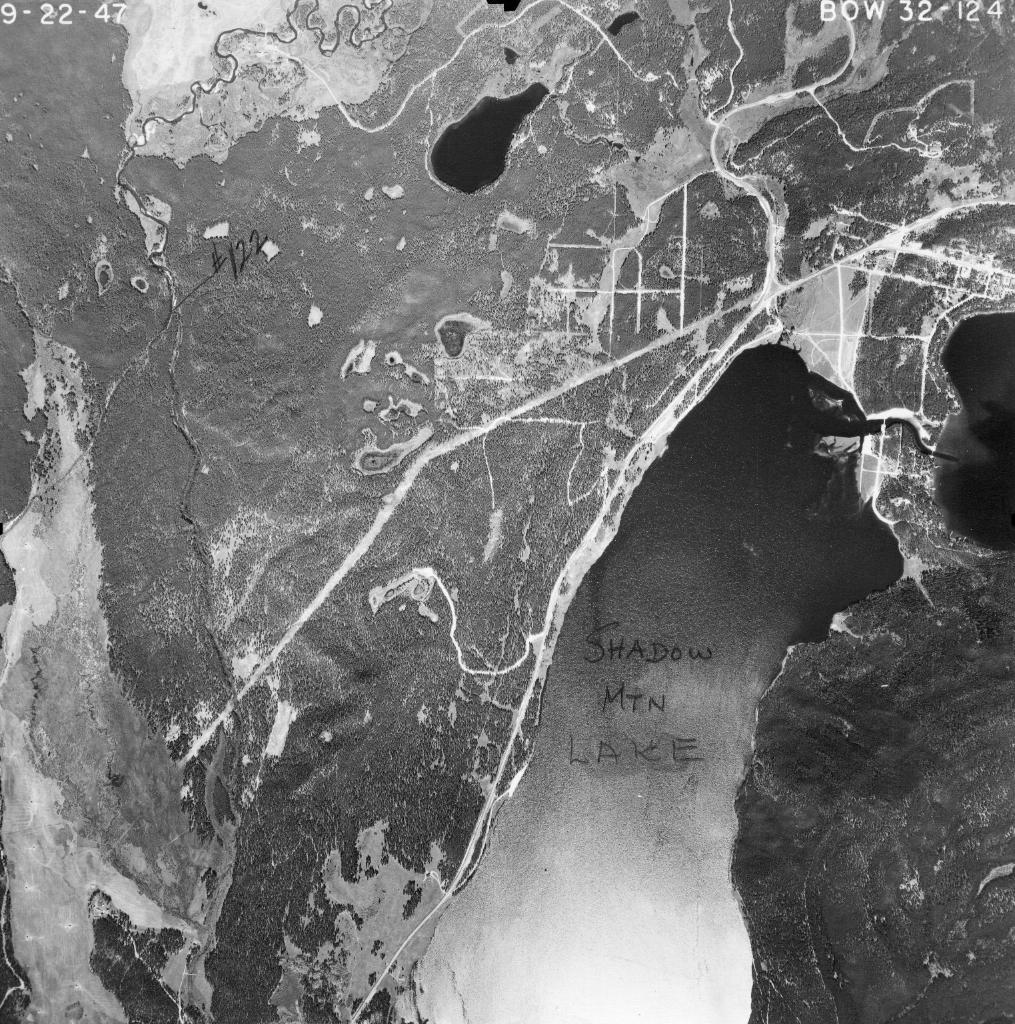
Shadow Mountain Lake as photographed by the United States Forest Service in 1947, with Grand Lake in the upper-right corner.

The creation of Shadow Mountain Lake was authorized by the Colorado-Big Thompson bill, passed in 1937, which also created the Colorado-Big Thompson Project. Water from the Grand Lake-Shadow Mountain Lake body is diverted through the Alva B. Adams tunnel, at the eastern edge of Grand Lake, into the Big Thompson River on the east side of the Continental Divide. Storage began in 1947.
