= Windy Gap Reservoir =

Reservoir in Grand County, Colorado, United States

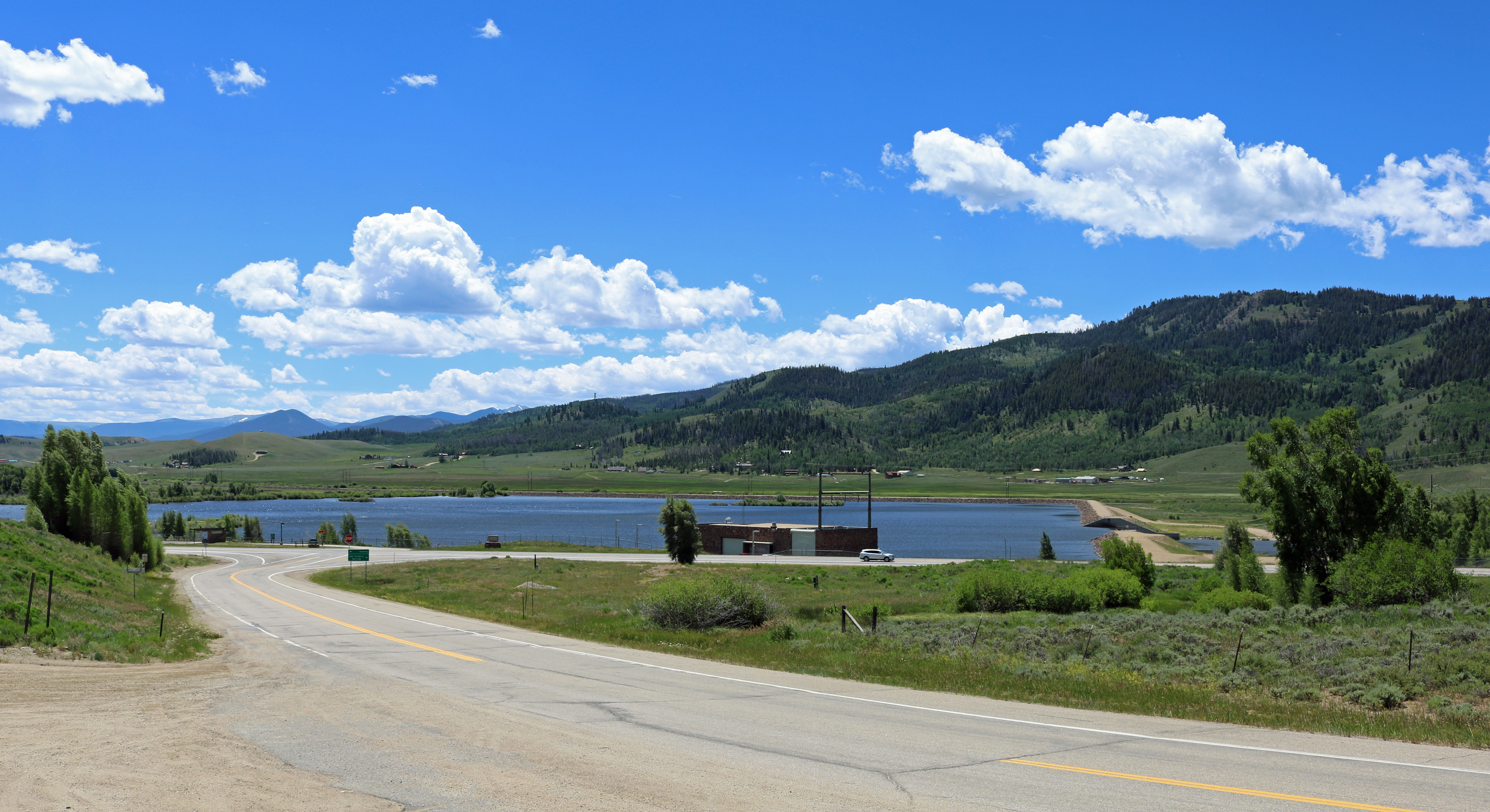
- The reservoir and dam in 2016.

- Location within Colorado Location within the United States
- Location: Grand County, Colorado
- Coordinates: 40°06′18″N 105°58′53″W
- Primary inflows: Colorado River
- Primary outflows: Colorado River
- Basin countries: United States
- Managing agency: Northern Colorado Water Conservancy District
- Water volume: 445 acre⋅ft (549,000 m^{3})

Windy Gap Reservoir, located near the town of Granby in Grand County, Colorado, is owned and operated by the Northern Colorado Water Conservancy District. The reservoir's inflow and outflow are from and to the Colorado River. The confluence of the Fraser River and the Colorado River is about a mile upstream from the reservoir.

A diversion dam creates the reservoir. A nearby pumping station sends water from the reservoir to Lake Granby, six miles away, where it is then pumped over the mountains to the Front Range.

The project is able to divert about 48,000 acre-feet of water per year, chiefly during the snowmelt season from April to July.

== Wildlife viewing ==
The Windy Gap Watchable Wildlife Area lies on the north side of the reservoir and provides parking and picnic tables.

== See also ==
- List of reservoirs in Colorado
