= Lake Granby =

Body of water in Colorado, United States

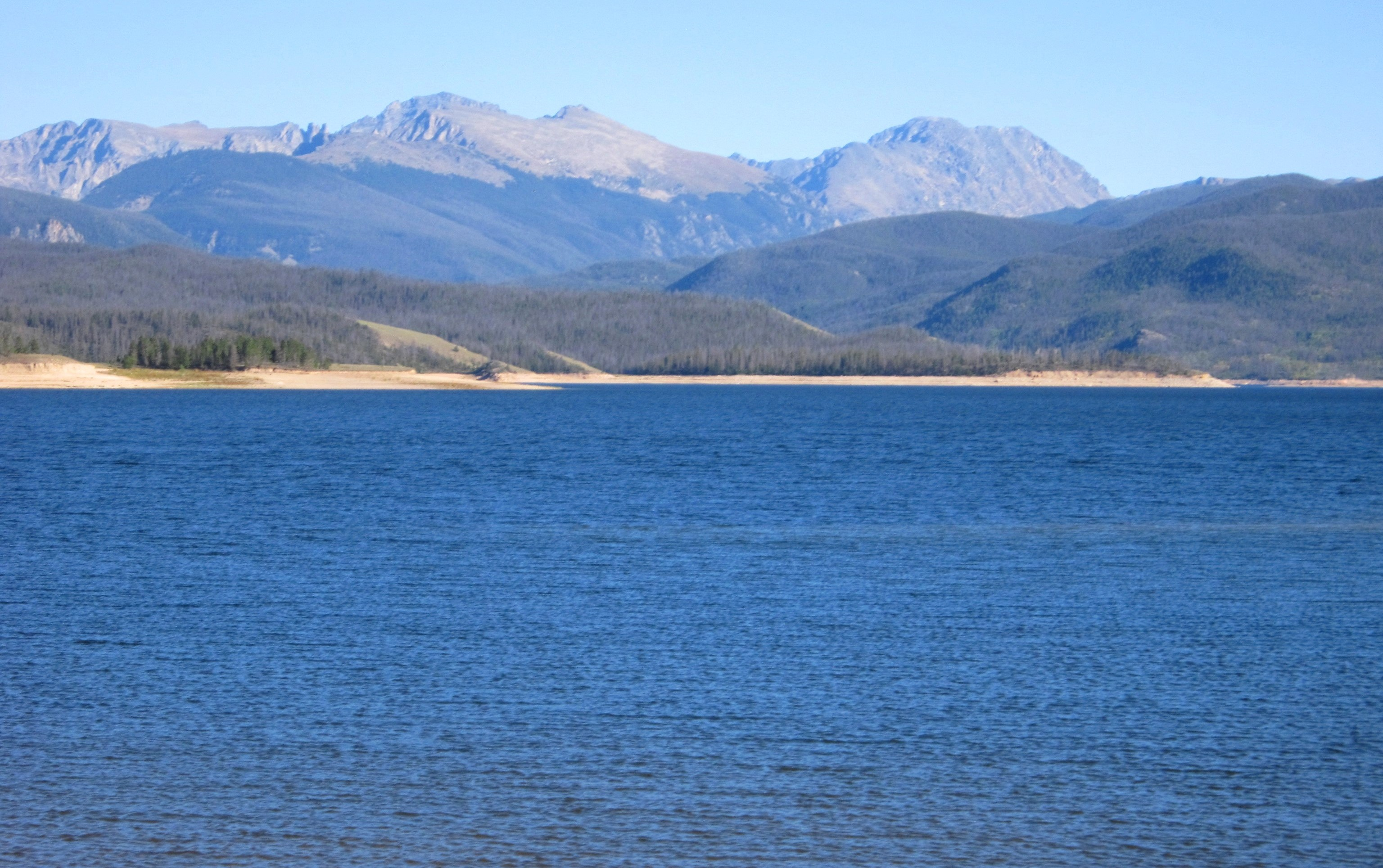
- Lake Granby looking east

- Location within Colorado Location within the United States
- Location: Grand County, Colorado
- Coordinates: 40°08′53″N 105°51′57″W
- Primary inflows: Colorado River
- Primary outflows: Colorado River
- Basin countries: United States
- Max. depth: 221 ft (67 m)
- Shore length^{1}: 40 mi (64 km)
- Surface elevation: 8,284 ft (2,525 m)
- Settlements: Grand Lake
- ^{1} Shore length is not a well-defined measure.

Lake Granby is the third largest body of water in Colorado.

It was created by the erection of Granby Dam, completed in 1950, as part of the Bureau of Reclamation's Colorado-Big Thompson Project. Water from Lake Granby is pumped via the Farr Pump plant though a pipeline that empties into a canal connected to Shadow Mountain Reservoir. The Bureau of Reclamation owns Farr Pump plant while Northern Water operates it. On its own, Lake Granby contains approximately 40 miles (64 km) of shoreline. The lake is popular with anglers and is continually stocked with rainbow trout and kokanee salmon.

The Lake is also home to the Lake Granby Yacht Club. At 8,280 feet (2,520 m), LGYC is one of the highest-elevation yacht clubs in the world, slightly beaten by Grand Lake Yacht Club at 8,369 feet (2,551 m) on nearby Grand Lake.

== Climate ==
Grand Lake 6 SSW is a weather station on the north shore of Lake Granby at an elevation of 8288 feet (2526 m). Lake Granby has a subalpine climate (Köppen Dfc) bordering on a humid continental climate (Köppen Dfb).

Climate data for Grand Lake 6 SSW, Colorado, 1991–2020 normals, 1948-2020 extremes: 8288ft (2526m)
Month	Jan	Feb	Mar	Apr	May	Jun	Jul	Aug	Sep	Oct	Nov	Dec	Year
Record high °F (°C)	49 (9)	53 (12)	62 (17)	73 (23)	86 (30)	88 (31)	89 (32)	88 (31)	83 (28)	74 (23)	65 (18)	58 (14)	89 (32)
Mean maximum °F (°C)	40.5 (4.7)	43.8 (6.6)	53.3 (11.8)	63.2 (17.3)	73.6 (23.1)	80.6 (27.0)	83.1 (28.4)	81.6 (27.6)	77.8 (25.4)	69.2 (20.7)	54.6 (12.6)	44.2 (6.8)	83.7 (28.7)
Mean daily maximum °F (°C)	25.8 (−3.4)	30.5 (−0.8)	39.8 (4.3)	48.3 (9.1)	59.4 (15.2)	70.1 (21.2)	74.8 (23.8)	72.7 (22.6)	66.9 (19.4)	54.7 (12.6)	39.5 (4.2)	28.0 (−2.2)	50.9 (10.5)
Daily mean °F (°C)	14.1 (−9.9)	17.5 (−8.1)	26.6 (−3.0)	35.7 (2.1)	45.4 (7.4)	54.1 (12.3)	59.4 (15.2)	57.8 (14.3)	51.3 (10.7)	40.9 (4.9)	28.7 (−1.8)	17.9 (−7.8)	37.4 (3.0)
Mean daily minimum °F (°C)	2.5 (−16.4)	4.5 (−15.3)	13.3 (−10.4)	23.1 (−4.9)	31.4 (−0.3)	38.1 (3.4)	44.1 (6.7)	42.8 (6.0)	35.8 (2.1)	27.1 (−2.7)	17.8 (−7.9)	7.8 (−13.4)	24.0 (−4.4)
Mean minimum °F (°C)	−23.1 (−30.6)	−21.8 (−29.9)	−12.3 (−24.6)	4.1 (−15.5)	18.1 (−7.7)	28.1 (−2.2)	35.0 (1.7)	33.0 (0.6)	23.8 (−4.6)	10.7 (−11.8)	−2.5 (−19.2)	−14.9 (−26.1)	−26.5 (−32.5)
Record low °F (°C)	−46 (−43)	−42 (−41)	−30 (−34)	−17 (−27)	−1 (−18)	21 (−6)	27 (−3)	25 (−4)	14 (−10)	−8 (−22)	−22 (−30)	−35 (−37)	−46 (−43)
Average precipitation inches (mm)	0.87 (22)	0.84 (21)	0.69 (18)	1.20 (30)	1.62 (41)	1.18 (30)	1.62 (41)	1.68 (43)	1.46 (37)	1.05 (27)	0.72 (18)	0.82 (21)	13.75 (349)
Source 1: NOAA
Source 2: XMACIS (records & monthly max/mins)

== See also ==
- List of largest reservoirs of Colorado
