= Stones Peak =

Mountain in the state of Colorado

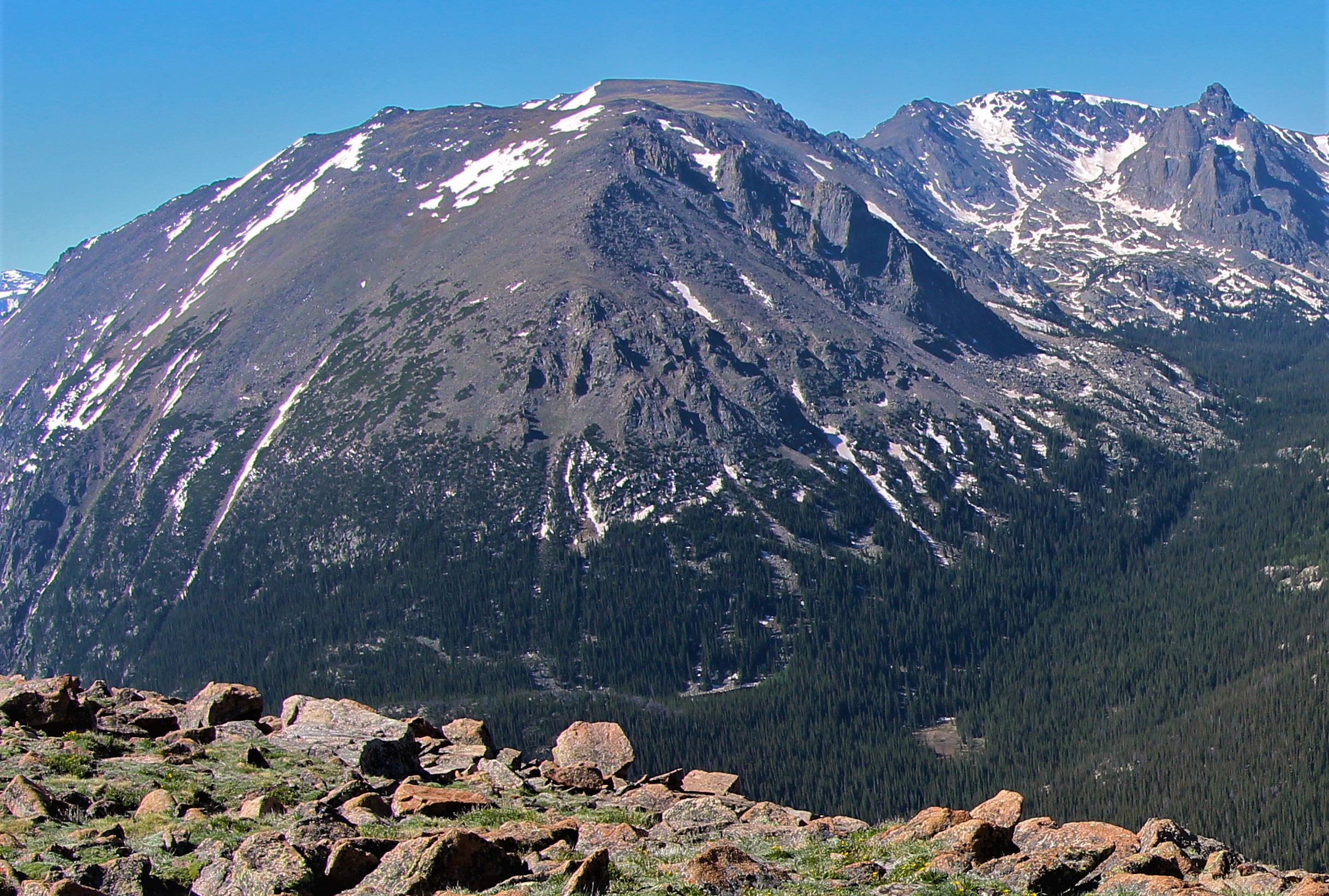
- North aspect, centered

Highest point
- Elevation: 12,922 ft (3,939 m)
- Prominence: 885 ft (270 m)
- Parent peak: Mount Julian (12,933 ft)
- Isolation: 2.27 mi (3.65 km)
- Coordinates: 40°21′16″N 105°43′14″W

Naming
- Etymology: George Hapgood Stone

Geography
- Location within Colorado Location within the United States
- Country: United States
- State: Colorado
- County: Larimer
- Protected area: Rocky Mountain National Park
- Parent range: Rocky Mountains; Front Range
- Topo map: USGS McHenrys Peak

Geology
- Rock age: Paleoproterozoic
- Rock type(s): Biotite schist and gneiss

Climbing
- Easiest route: class 2 Southwest Ridge

Stones Peak is a 12,922-foot-elevation (3,939-meter) mountain summit located in Larimer County, Colorado. It is situated in Rocky Mountain National Park, one mile east of the Continental Divide and 11.5 miles (18.5 km) west of the community of Estes Park. Stones Peak is part of the Front Range which is a subrange of the Rocky Mountains. Precipitation runoff from the mountain drains into tributaries of the Big Thompson River. Topographic relief is significant as the summit rises over 3,900 feet (1,200 meters) above the Big Thompson River in Forest Canyon in two miles. The peak is a prominent landmark viewed from Forest Canyon Overlook along the Trail Ridge Road.

== History ==
The peak's namesake is glacial geologist George Hapgood Stone (1841–1917), a professor at Colorado College (1881–1888) who visited this area in 1886. The mountain's toponym was officially adopted in 1932 by the United States Board on Geographic Names.

The first documented ascent of the peak (then spelled as "Stone's Peak") was made by Frederick H. Chapin and William L. Hallett as published in Chapin's 1889 book, Mountaineering in Colorado: The Peaks about Estes Park.

== Climate ==
According to the Köppen climate classification system, Stones Peak is located in an alpine subarctic climate zone with cold, snowy winters, and cool to warm summers. Due to its altitude, it receives precipitation all year, as snow in winter and as thunderstorms in summer, with a dry period in late spring. This climate supports the Sprague Glacier on the southwest aspect of Stones Peak.

== Gallery ==
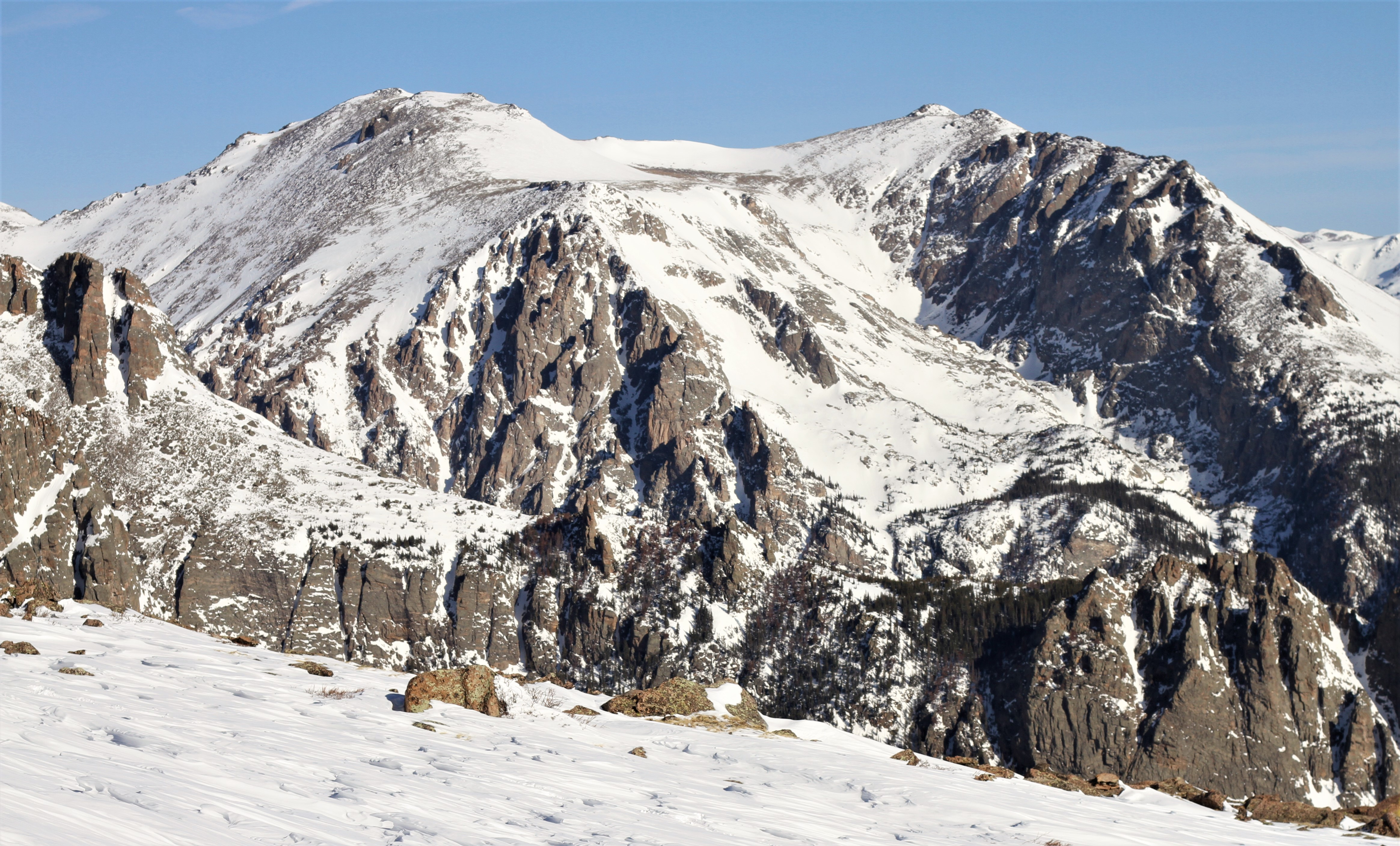
Southeast aspect

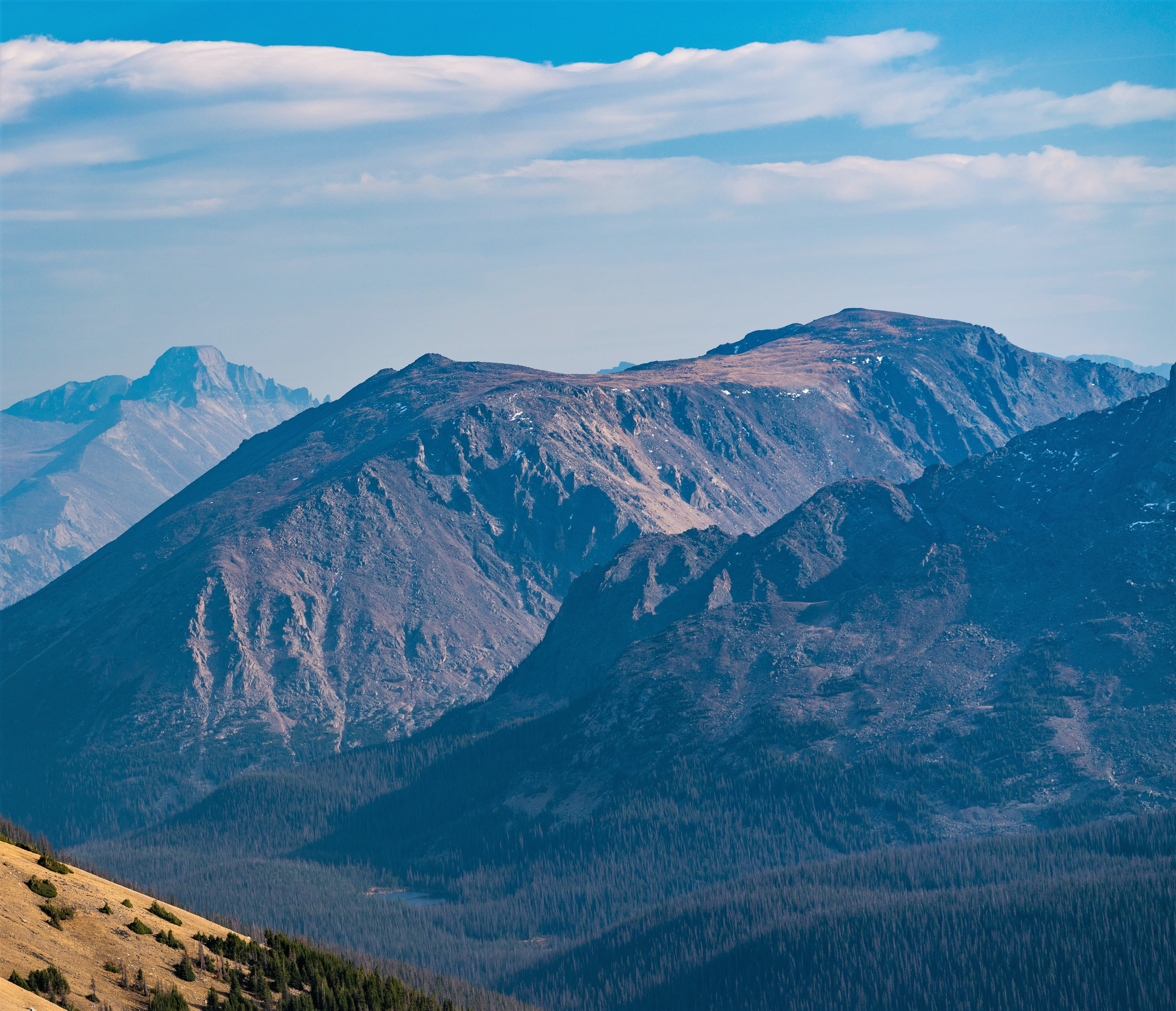
North aspect of Stones Peak, with Longs Peak (distant left)

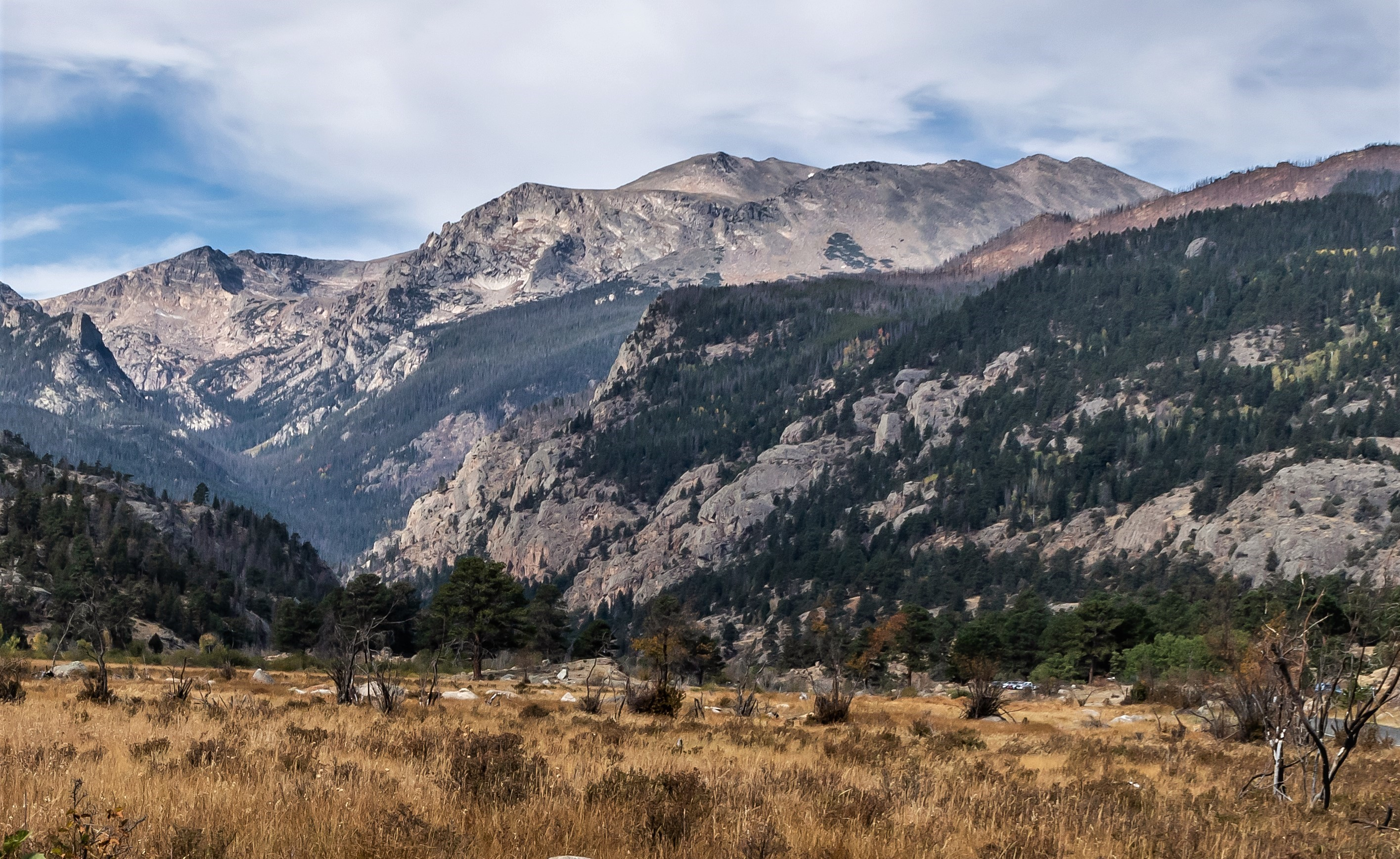
East aspect of Stones Peak, from Moraine Park

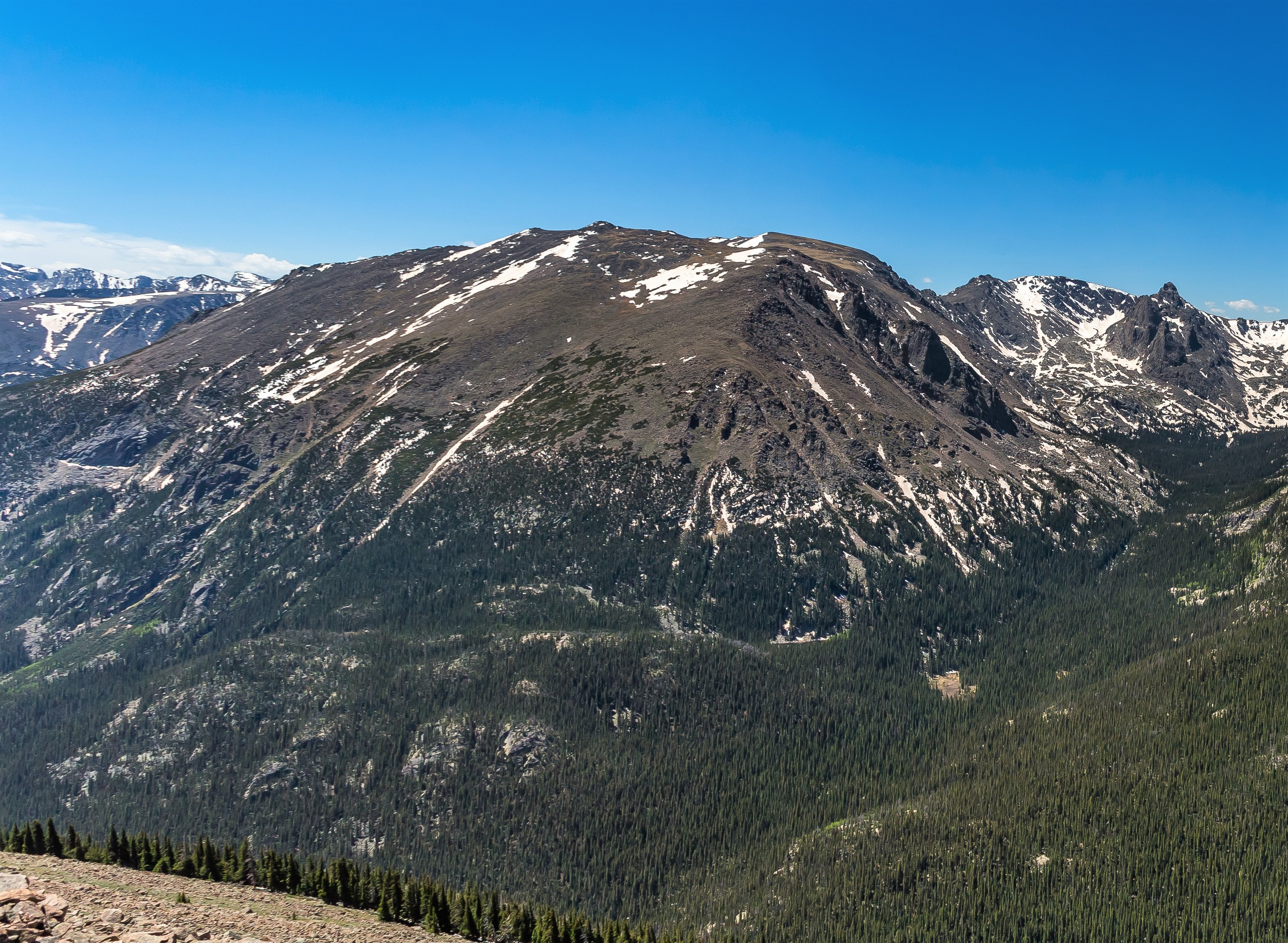
Stones Peak from Trail Ridge Road

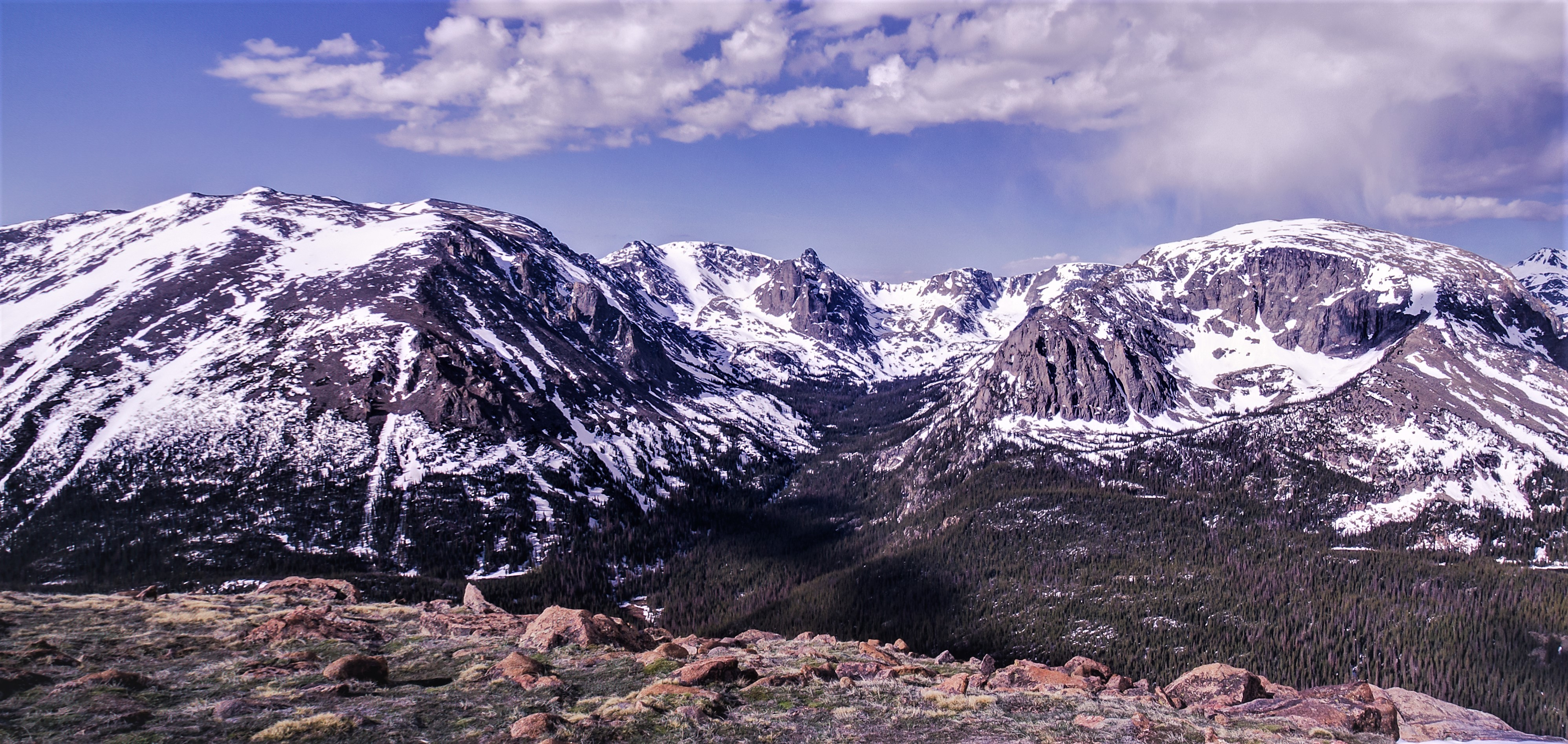
Stones Peak (left), Hayden Spire centered, and Terra Tomah Mountain (right) viewed from Trail Ridge Road

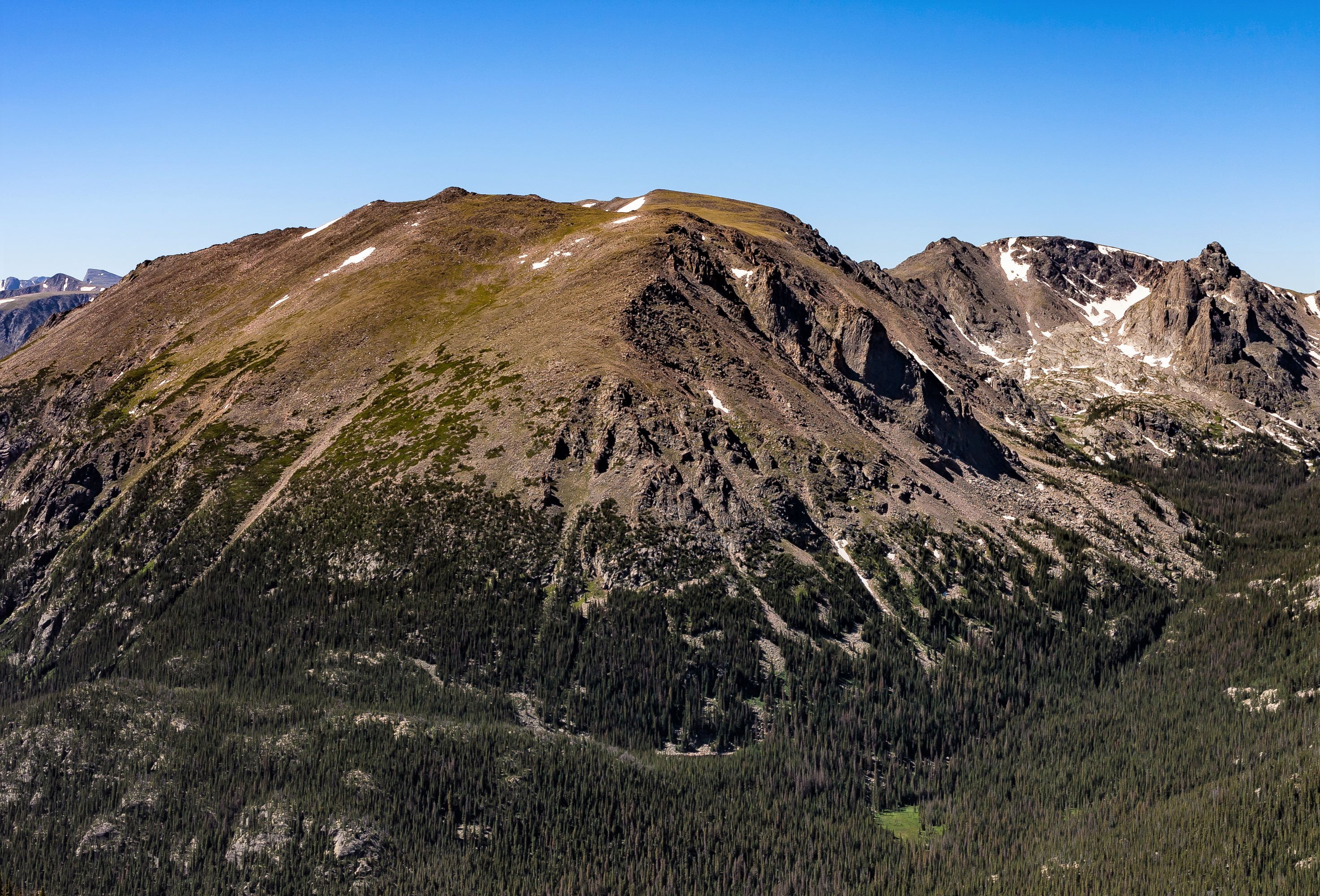
Stones Peak centered, with Sprague Mountain and Hayden Spire to right

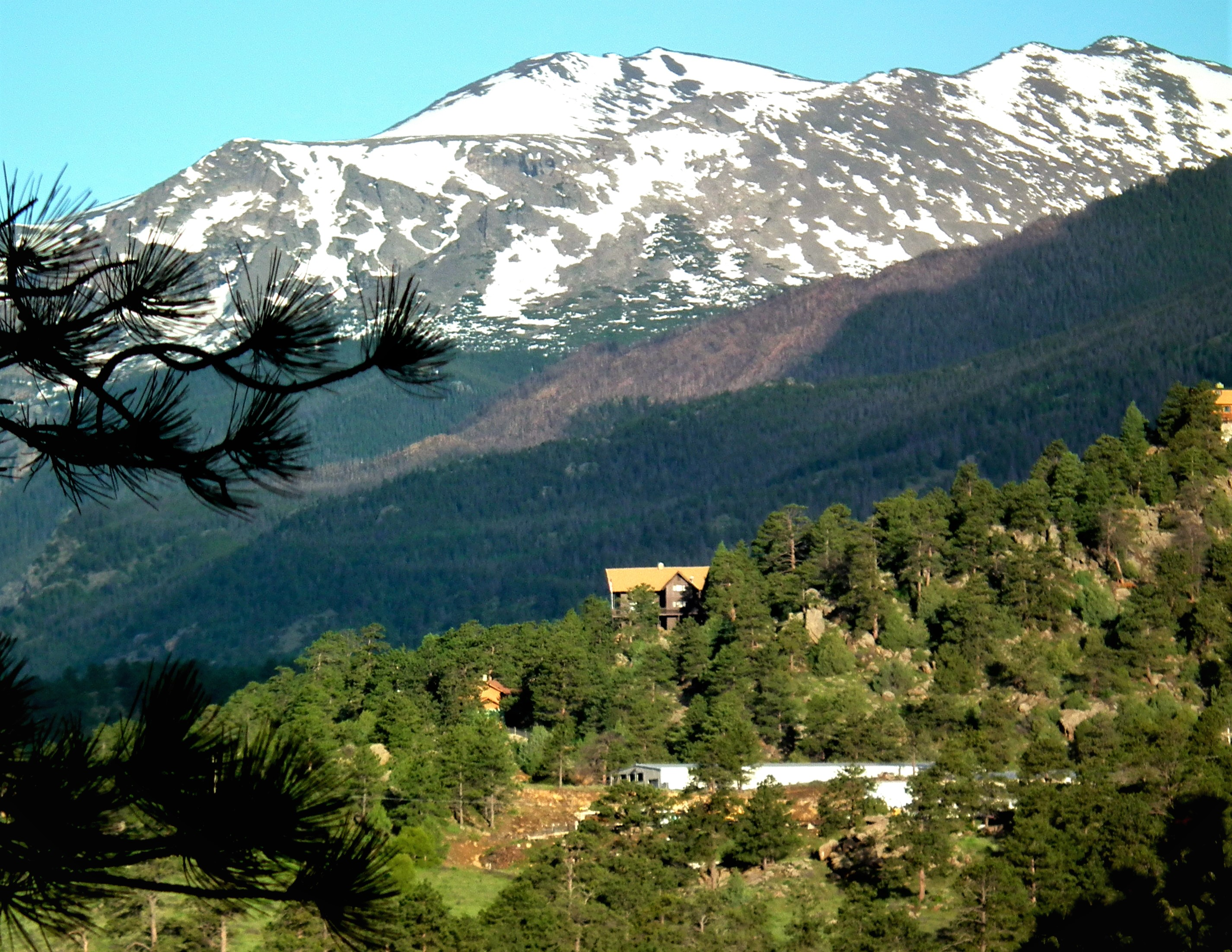
East aspect

== See also ==
- List of peaks in Rocky Mountain National Park
- Mountains of Larimer County, Colorado
