= Mount Julian =

Mount Julian may refer to:

== Places ==
- Mount Julian, Queensland, Australia
- Mount Julian, Ontario, Canada

== Mountains ==
- Mount Julian (Alberta), Canada
- Mount Julian (Colorado), United States
