= Hayden Spire =

Summit in Rocky Mountain National Park

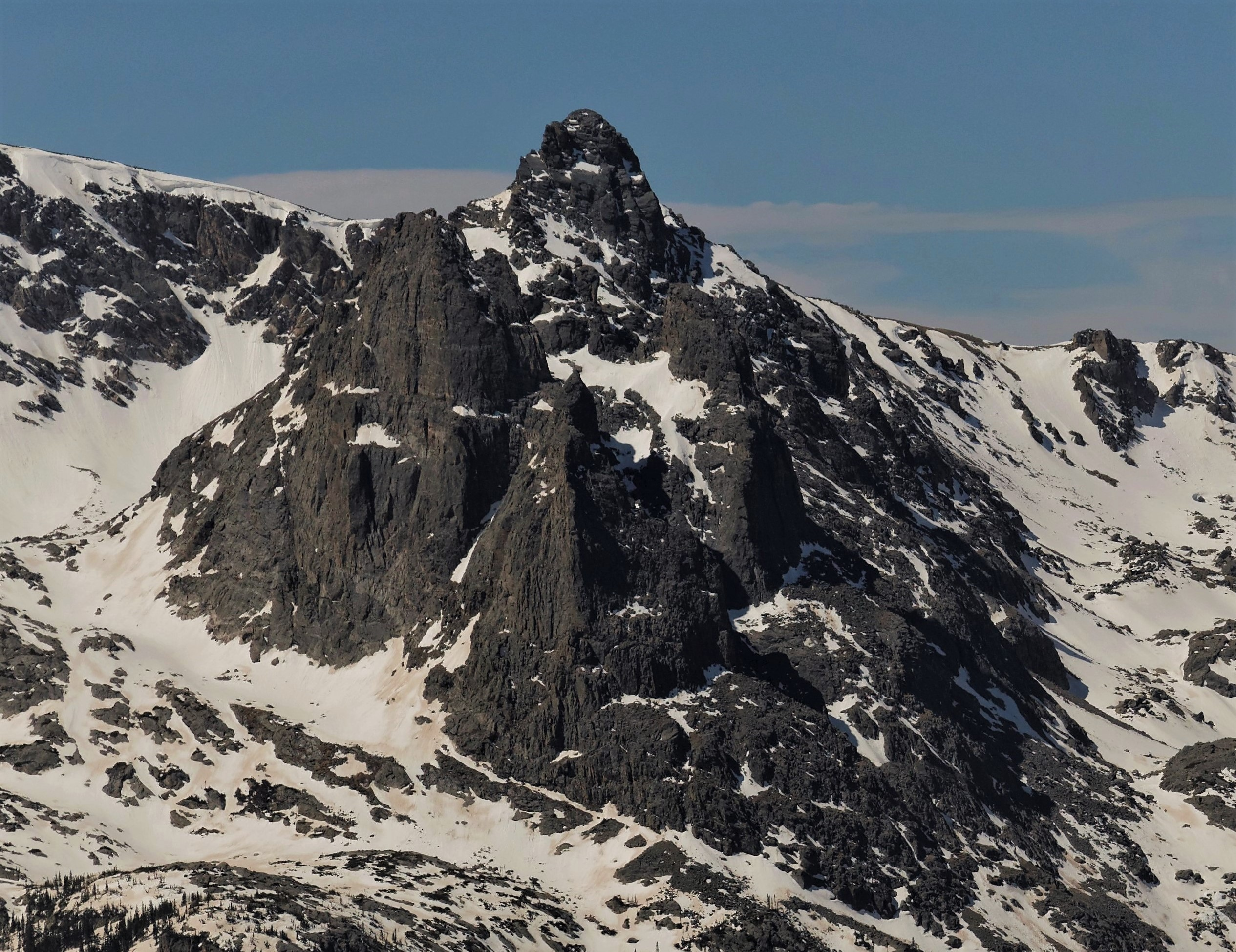
- Northeast aspect

Highest point
- Elevation: 12,480 ft (3,800 m)
- Prominence: 120 ft (37 m)
- Parent peak: Sprague Mountain (12,713 ft)
- Isolation: 0.44 mi (0.71 km)
- Coordinates: 40°21′07″N 105°44′27″W

Naming
- Etymology: Julian Hayden

Geography
- Location within Colorado Location within the United States
- Location: Rocky Mountain National Park; Larimer County, Colorado, US
- Parent range: Rocky Mountains; Front Range
- Topo map: USGS McHenrys Peak

Geology
- Rock type(s): gneiss, schist

Climbing
- Easiest route: class 5.2 climbing NE ridge

Hayden Spire is a 12,480+ foot elevation (3,800 meter) pillar located in Rocky Mountain National Park, in Larimer County, Colorado, United States. It is situated 12 miles west of the community of Estes Park in Hayden Gorge, along a short spur on the Continental Divide. Hayden Spire is part of the Front Range which is a subset of the Rocky Mountains. It is the highest tower in a cluster of spires which can be viewed from Forest Canyon Overlook along the Trail Ridge Road. Topographic relief is significant as the north aspect rises 2,100 feet (640 meters) above Hayden Gulch in one-half mile. Neighbors include Terra Tomah Mountain two miles to the north, and Mount Julian 1.8 mile to the northwest.

== Climate ==
According to the Köppen climate classification system, Hayden Spire is located in an alpine subarctic climate zone with cold, snowy winters, and cool to warm summers. Due to its altitude, it receives precipitation all year, as snow in winter, and as thunderstorms in summer, with a dry period in late spring. Precipitation runoff from the mountain drains northeast into the Big Thompson River via Hayden Creek.

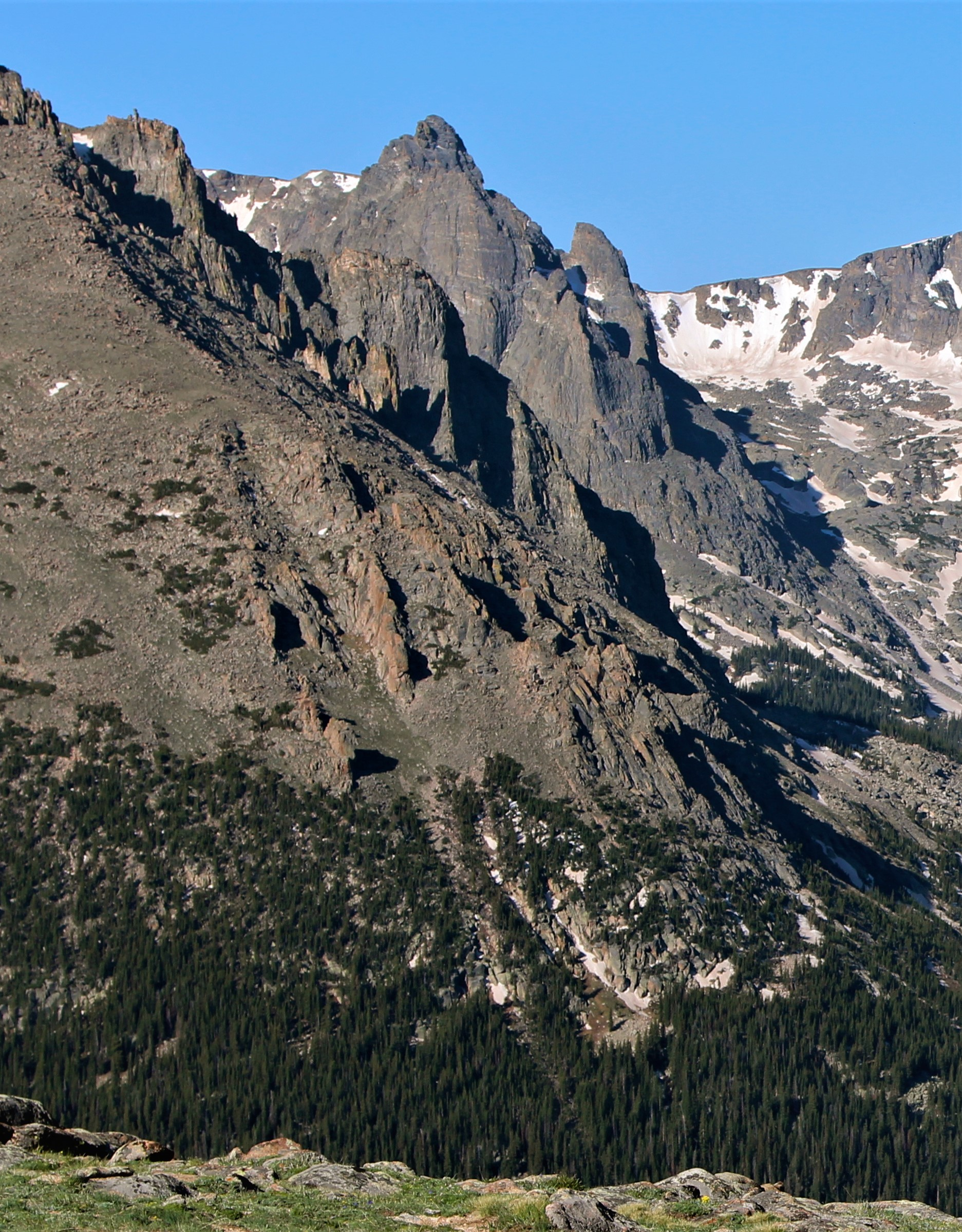
Hayden Spire

== Etymology ==
Hayden Spire was named in 1911 by Abner Erwin Sprague for Julian Hayden (1886–1964), a civil engineer who settled in Estes Park in 1906. He and his brother Albert fostered much of the development of Estes Park. The mountain's name has been officially adopted by the United States Board on Geographic Names. Nearby Mount Julian is also named after Julian Hayden. Hayden Creek honors both brothers.

== See also ==
- List of peaks in Rocky Mountain National Park
- Mountains of Larimer County, Colorado
