= Tuxedo Park =

Tuxedo Park may refer to:

- Tuxedo Park, Colorado of the Rocky Mountain National Park near Estes Park
- Tuxedo Park, Missouri, a community now merged with Webster Groves, Missouri
- Tuxedo Park, New York, listed on the National Register of Historic Places in Orange County, New York
- Tuxedo Park (Atlanta), listed on the National Register of Historic Places in Fulton County, Georgia
- Tuxedo Park, Calgary, Alberta, Canada
- A trim level of the Jeep CJ
- Tuxedo Park a book by Jennet Conant about Alfred Lee Loomis

== See also ==
- Tuxedo (disambiguation)
- Tuxedo Park School
