= Sprague Mountain =

Mountain in the state of Colorado

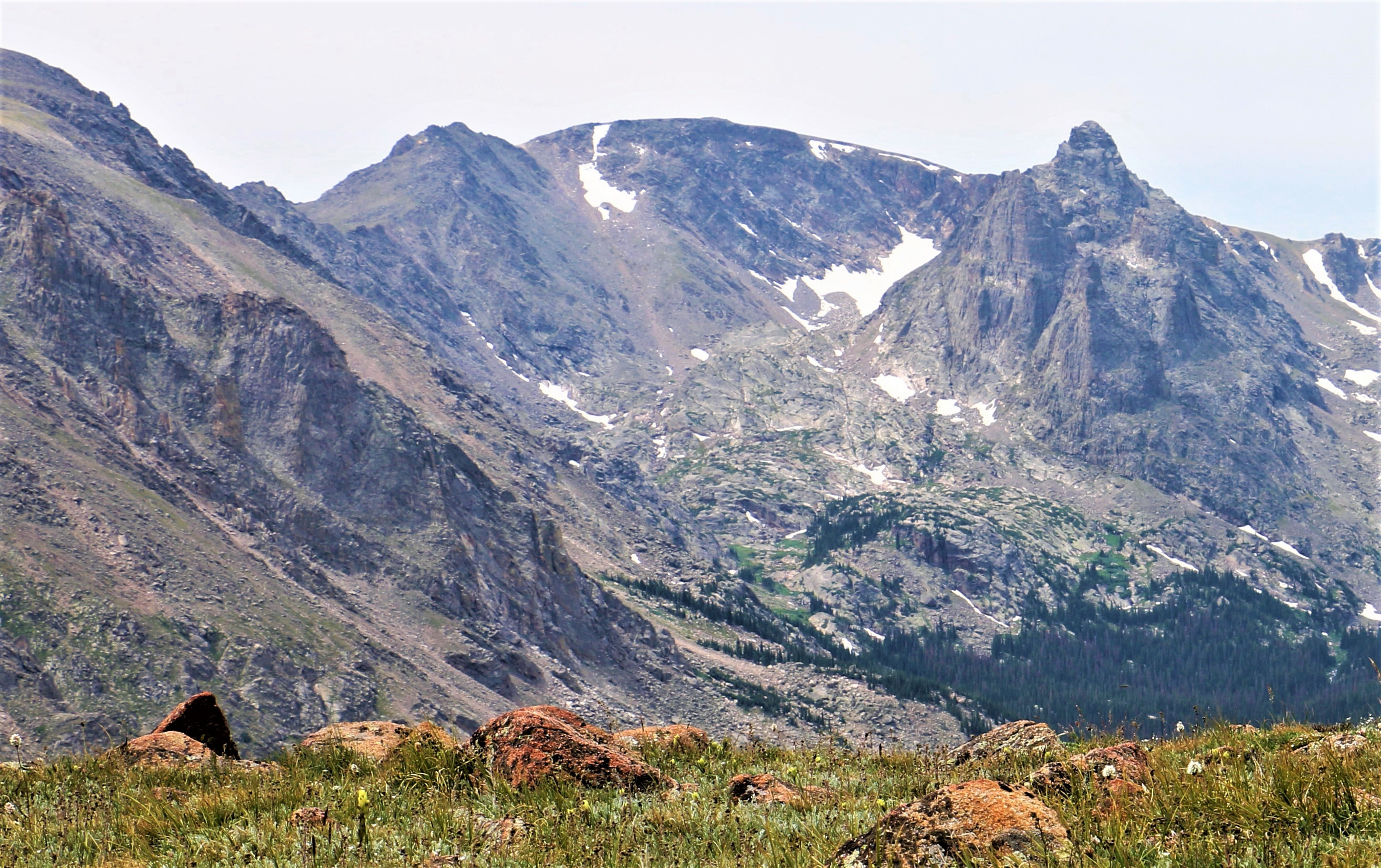
- North aspect, centered. (Hayden Spire to right)

Highest point
- Elevation: 12,713 ft (3,875 m)
- Prominence: 552 ft (168 m)
- Parent peak: Stones Peak (12,922 ft)
- Isolation: 1.04 mi (1.67 km)
- Coordinates: 40.3466°N 105.7364°W

Geography
- Location within Colorado Location within the United States
- Country: United States
- State: Colorado
- County: Grand County / Larimer County
- Protected area: Rocky Mountain National Park
- Parent range: Rocky Mountains; Front Range
- Topo map: USGS McHenrys Peak

Geology
- Rock age: Paleoproterozoic
- Rock type(s): Biotite schist and gneiss

Climbing
- Easiest route: class 2 Southeast ridge

Sprague Mountain is a 12,713-foot-elevation (3,875-meter) mountain summit on the boundary shared by Grand County and Larimer County, in Colorado, United States. It is set on the Continental Divide in the Front Range of the Rocky Mountains, and 12.5 miles (20.1 km) west of the community of Estes Park. Precipitation runoff from the mountain's east side drains into tributaries of the Big Thompson River and the west slope drains into headwaters of Tonahutu Creek which flows to Grand Lake. Topographic relief is significant as the summit rises over 1,900 feet (580 meters) above Tonahutu Creek in one mile. The peak is visible from Trail Ridge Road.

== Etymology ==
Abner Erwin Sprague (1850–1943) was one of the early settlers of Estes Park who homesteaded in the nearby Moraine Park area in 1874. Other landforms in the national park bearing his name include Sprague Lake, Sprague Glacier, and Sprague Pass. The mountain's toponym has been officially adopted by the United States Board on Geographic Names.

== Climate ==
According to the Köppen climate classification system, Sprague Mountain is located in an alpine subarctic climate zone with cold, snowy winters, and cool to warm summers. Due to its altitude, it receives precipitation all year, as snow in winter and as thunderstorms in summer, with a dry period in late spring. This climate supports the Sprague Glacier on the south aspect of the mountain.

== See also ==
- List of peaks in Rocky Mountain National Park
- Mountains of Larimer County, Colorado
- Mountains of Grand County, Colorado
