= Tux (disambiguation) =

A tux is a type of formal dress.

Tux or TUX may also refer to:

== Arts and entertainment ==
- Tux, a minor character from Super Mario 64
- Tux the Penguin, an animated character from Out of Jimmy's Head

== Computing ==
- Tux (mascot), the Linux mascot
- TUX web server, an in-kernel Web server for Linux

== Places ==
- Tux, Tyrol, Austria
- Tumbler Ridge Airport, Canada (by IATA code)

== Other uses ==
- MW Tux, a chain of clothing stores
- Tux Cattle, an Austrian cattle breed

== See also ==
- Tuck (disambiguation)
- Tuxedo (disambiguation)
