= Sprague Lake =

Sprague Lake may refer to:

- Sprague Lake (Colorado), a lake in Rocky Mountain National Park, Colorado
- Sprague Lake (Michigan), a lake in Osceola County, Michigan
- Sprague Lake (Minnesota), a lake in Rice County, Minnesota
- Sprague Lake (North Dakota), a lake in Sargent County, North Dakota
- Sprague Lake (Oregon), a lake in Marion County, Oregon
- Sprague Lake (Washington), a lake on the border of Adams and Lincoln counties
- Sprague Lake (Whatcom County, Washington), a lake in Whatcom County, Washington
