= Abner E. Sprague =

- Born: March 28, 1850; Dundee, Illinois
- Died: December 27, 1943 (aged 93); Denver, Colorado
- Occupations: Surveyor, civil engineer, explorer, innkeeper, author, and rancher
- Spouse: Mary Alberta Morrison (m. 1888)

Abner E. Sprague (March 28, 1850 – December 27, 1943), born in Illinois, was a pioneer of Larimer County, Colorado, arriving in the Colorado Territory at the age of 14. He grew up in the Big Thompson Valley and settled in Estes Park and Loveland. He was an explorer, surveyor, mountaineer, civil engineer, innkeeper, rancher, and author.

Most of his adult life was spent operating Sprague Hotel and Sprague Lodge outside of Estes Park. He built roads, brought in water and electricity for Sprague Lodge, and acted as a mountain guide for his visitors. Sprague Hotel, on Sprague's ranch, was called a dude ranch.

His works include Reminiscence of a Pioneer and My Pioneer Life: The Memoirs of Abner E. Sprague. He also contributed to Enos Mills' The story of Estes Park and a guidebook.

Sprague Lake, Sprague Mountain, and Sprague Pass in Rocky Mountain National Park were named after Sprague. Enos Mills named Sprague Glacier.

== Early life ==
Abner E. Sprague, the son of Thomas and Mary Sprague, was born in Dundee, Illinois, on March 28, 1850. He had a brother Fred and sister Arab. Ten years after his birth, his father came to the Colorado Territory. Abner followed with an ox team in July 1864 and lived and was educated in the Big Thompson Valley in Larimer County, Colorado, near the border with Weld County. The family homesteaded in the Big Thompson canyon near Loveland, where they intended to farm the land, but frequent floods hampered their success. His father served in the legislature for the territory.

In 1868, Spraque traveled on horseback for ten days with two friends in the Estes Park and Rocky Mountain National Park area. They visited Rattlesnake Park (now Pinewood Lake), Quillan Gulch, Little Elk Park, Muggins Gulch, and Park Hill. They spent a night in the cabin of Dave Likins, who settled near Quillan Gulch and the Little Thompson River drainage. In 1872, he returned to the area that would become Estes Park with a group of men and women who traveled on horseback and three wagons. They passed by Griff Evans' cabin and camped at the foot of Prospect Mountain. In July 1874, Sprague and Alson Chapman rode horseback on a two-week trek of rain and high winds up to Wind River and to the foot of Longs Peak, which he climbed for the first time.

== Career ==
=== Businessman ===
In 1875, Sprague homesteaded and built a cabin in Willow Park, now Moraine Park near Estes Park, and operated a sawmill and ranch. He and his friend Clarence Chubbuck, who homesteaded at the same time as Sprague, were among the first settlers in the area. Before they could build their cabins, the men went to Loveland for spring roundup and Chubbuck was shot and killed. Sprague took over Chubbuck's homesteading claim. Sprague's parents and siblings moved to Moraine Park with him.

The Earl of Dunraven of Ireland bought thousands of acres of land, streams, and springs around present-day Estes Park. (Note: By 1880, Dunhaven owned 15,000 acres of land, streams, and springs.) Among his aspirations, Dunraven wanted to use the land as a cattle ranch and private hunting grounds. As settlers moved into the area, they built fences to keep Dunraven's workers from driving livestock onto their land. Dunraven's men tore down the fences and drove cattle over the settlers' land. Theodore Whyte, the Earl's manager and agent, tried to force Sprague to leave by driving Dunhaven's cattle across Sprague's land. Sprague and his shepherd dogs foiled Whyte's attempts twice and talked to the man in person, which ended the conflict. After forming a group of like-minded settlers to oppose Dunraven, the assembly challenged the Irishman's ownership of the land.

Sprague and Horace W. Ferguson built the Sprague–Ferguson Sawmill camp to cut Spruce and Douglas Fir shingles at Bierstadt Lake in the Mill Creek Basin beginning in the winter of 1876. To get to the camp, they built a "rough wagon road" to the camp from Hollowell Park. (Note: The road to the sawmill degraded over time. It appeared on the 1915 USGS map, but it did not appear on the Clatworthy map of 1921.)

Beginning in 1876, the Spragues entertained tourists. Sprague served food to travelers and later built additional cabins as lodging for tourists on his dude ranch. Sprague made most of his income from tourists, so he built a large lodge there, called Sprague Hotel, and, by 1887, trails over the mountain. Sprague and his brother Fred operated a stagecoach that delivered people and freight from the Loveland to Moraine Park, near Estes Park. The stagecoach operated through a dusty, rock-filled, and narrow canyon that was subject to flooding.

Sprague and his brother Fred were guides. In 1879, Sprague guided William L. Hallett and his bride on a 30-day journey from Estes Park to Grand Lake.

In 1902, Sprague and his wife Mary Alberta partnered with J.D. Stead and his wife, providing lodging for up to 100 people. Two years later, the Steads bought the ranch, lodge, and cabins.

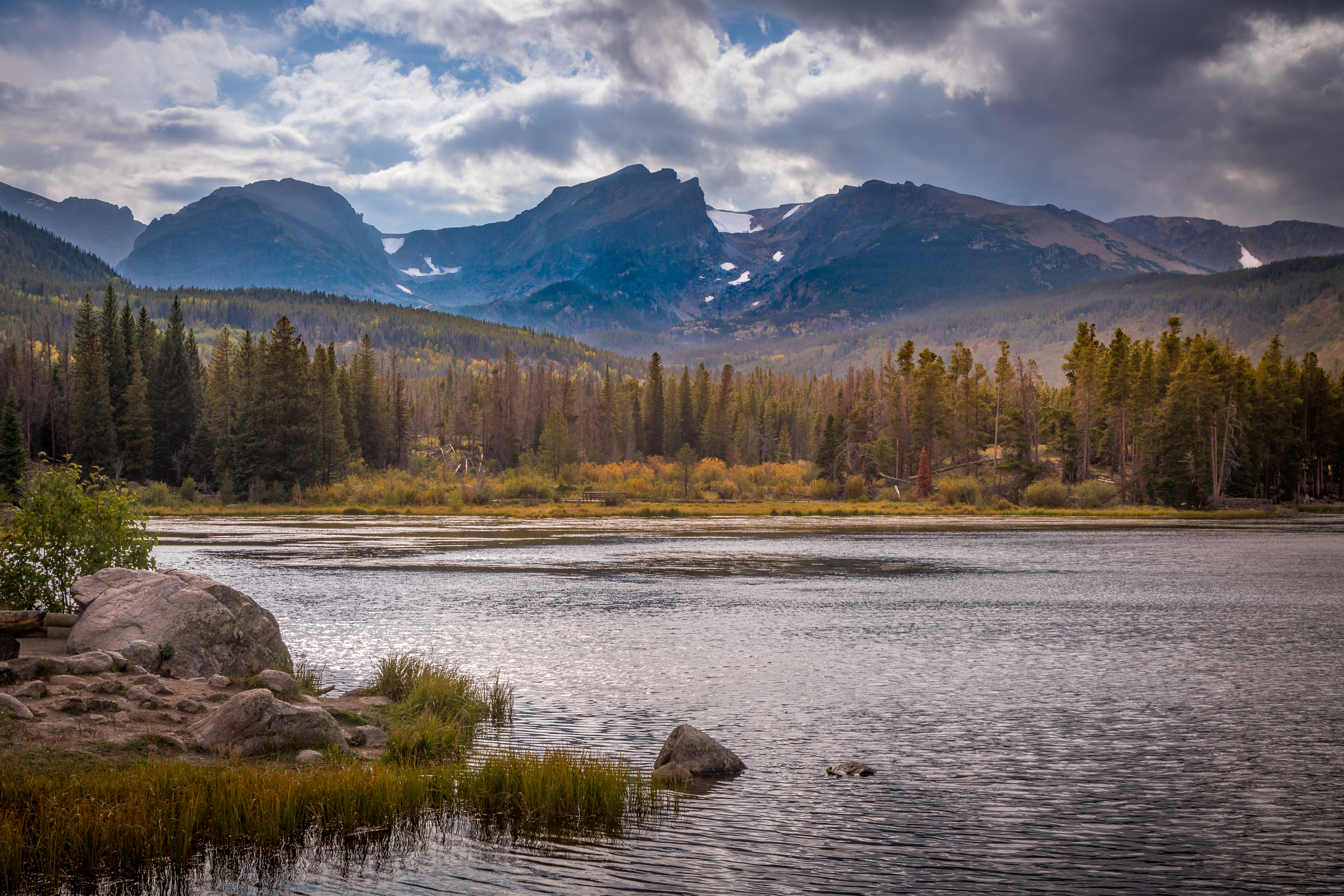
Early evening at Sprague Lake, in Rocky Mountain National Park, Colorado.

In 1908, he and his wife built a summer cabin in Glacier Basin (now in Rocky Mountain National Park) and two years later built a road to Glacier Basin from Tuxedo Park, which is now part of Bear Lake Road. In 1910 or 1914, Sprague built Sprague Lake, Cabin Lake (no longer in existence), and Sprague Lodge. He stocked the lakes with trout. He constructed pipes that brought in water from Boulder Brook and electricity from a hydroelectric plant west of the lodge from Glacier Creek. Sprague and Enos Mills printed tourist maps of the Estes Park area.

Sprague added cabins to the property. His nephew and adopted child, Edgar Stopher, operated Sprague Lodge from 1939 to 1962. (Note: Watrous said that Sprague operated Sprague Lodge until his death.) The site is now part of the Rocky Mountain National Park. On the 50th anniversary of his first ascent up Longs Peak, Sprague climbed it once again.

=== Surveyor and civil engineer ===
Sprague was a surveyor in Nebraska for the Missouri Pacific Railroad in the 1880s. At some point, he trained to be a civil engineer. After he completed his work in Nebraska, Sprague worked in Colorado for the Union Pacific Railroad as an assistant civil engineer.

Sprague and his wife moved to Loveland in 1904. He worked as a surveyor, civil engineer, and rancher in Loveland. He surveyed for the town of Estes Park in 1905. In Larimer County, Colorado, he served as the county surveyor for three terms. He was instrumental in the growth of the city of Estes Park and the Rocky Mountain National Park.

=== Author ===
Sprague wrote:

- Sprague, A. E. (May 1935). "Pioneering on the Big Thompson and in Estes Park". Colorado Magazine. Vol. 12.
- Sprague, Abner E.; Ashley, Patricia D. (1997) [1937]. Reminiscence of a pioneer. OCLC 38172075.
- Mills, Enos A.; Angell, George H. (cartographer); Sprague, Abner E. (contrib.) (1905). The story of Estes Park and a guidebook, with a folded map. Denver, Colorado: Outdoor Life Publishing Company. OCLC 3225737.
- Sprague, Abner Erwin; Stopher, Edgar (1999). My Pioneer Life: The Memoirs of Abner E. Sprague. Rocky Mountain Nature Association. ISBN 978-0-930487-72-0.

Manuscripts of “My First Visit to Estes Park” and "Transportation" are held in the Stephen H. Hart Library and Research Center, History Colorado in Manuscript Collection 597.

== Personal life ==
Sprague met Mary Alberta Morrison when he worked in Nebraska for the Missouri Pacific Railroad as a surveyor in the 1880s. On December 20, 1888, Sprague married Morrison at Hickman, Nebraska. After their marriage, the couple lived in the Moraine Park area near Estes Park that he homesteaded. They did not have any children, but they took in Mary's sister's children, Alberta and Edgar Stopher.

Sprague was a member of the Society of Colorado Pioneers and the Rotary International. He collected insects, and Sprague donated his collection a few weeks before he died to the Colorado Museum of Natural History. (Note: The Colorado Museum of Natural History could refer to the former name of the Denver Museum of Nature and Science or the University of Colorado Museum of Natural History in Boulder, Colorado.)

In 1939, Sprague was the first person to pay an entrance fee to the Rocky Mountain National Park. In their later years, Sprague and his wife built a house in Estes Park. Intending to spend the winter in Denver, at the Brown Palace Hotel, Sprague became ill. Two days later, he died on December 27, 1943, at Denver's Presbyterian Hospital.

== Legacy ==
Places in Rocky Mountain National Park named for Sprague,

- Sprague Lake was named for Sprague
- Sprague Mountain
- Sprague Pass

Enos Mills named Sprague Glacier of Rocky Mountain National Park.

== Bibliography ==
- Burke, Marril Lee (2007). A bumpy ride : a history of stagecoaching in Colorado. Lake City, CO : Western Reflections. ISBN 978-1-932738-30-8.
- Butler, William B. (2008). Rocky Mountain National Park historic places. Estes Park, Colorado: Estes Park Museum Friends and Foundation Press. ISBN 978-1-60725-754-7.
- Carothers, June E. (1951). Estes Park, past and present. Denver: University of Denver Press.
