= Terra Tomah Mountain =

Summit in Colorado, United States

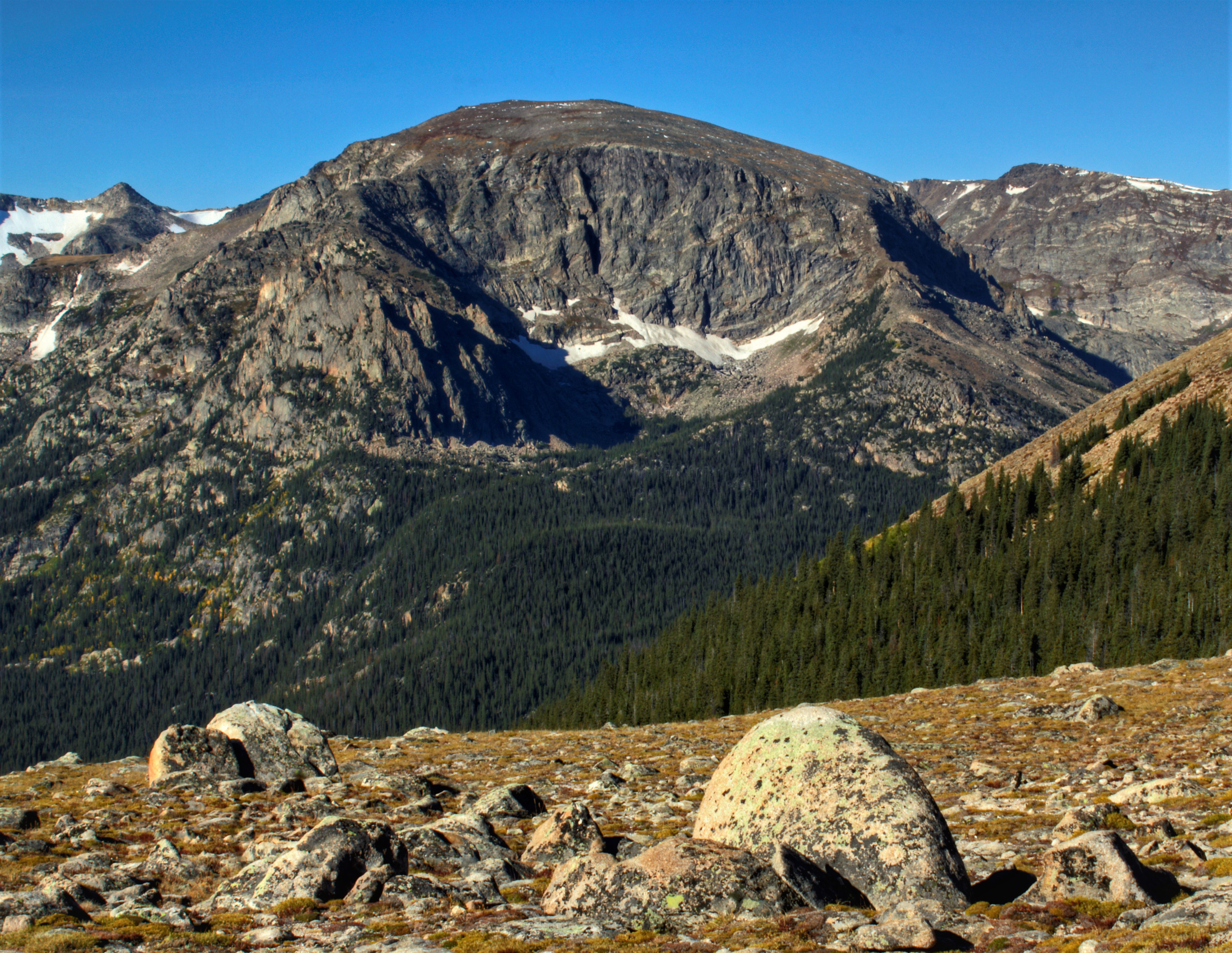
- Northeast aspect

Highest point
- Elevation: 12,718 ft (3,876 m)
- Prominence: 238 ft (73 m)
- Parent peak: Mount Julian (12,933 ft)
- Isolation: 0.61 mi (0.98 km)
- Coordinates: 40°22′35″N 105°44′54″W

Geography
- Location within Colorado Location within the United States
- Location: Rocky Mountain National Park; Larimer County, Colorado, US
- Parent range: Rocky Mountains; Front Range
- Topo map: USGS Trail Ridge

Geology
- Rock type: granite

Climbing
- Easiest route: class 3 Southwest ridge

Terra Tomah Mountain is a 12,718-foot-elevation (3,876-meter) mountain summit located in Rocky Mountain National Park, in Larimer County, of Colorado, United States. It is situated 13 miles west of the community of Estes Park, and 1.5 mile east of the Continental Divide. Terra Tomah Mountain is part of the Front Range which is a subset of the Rocky Mountains. Topographic relief is significant as the northeast aspect rises 3,300 feet (1,000 meters) above Forest Canyon in 1.5 mile. It is a prominent landmark viewed from Forest Canyon Overlook along the Trail Ridge Road.

== Etymology ==
In 1914 George Barnard was hiking here with the Colorado Mountain Club. Inspired by a lake, he chanted a Cahuilla ghost dance song with the lyrics "terra toma", which was popular among students at Pomona College where he attended. The president of the club, James Grafton Rogers, submitted the name for the lake to the federal government for consideration. However, the government erred by applying this name to the mountain instead. In 1923 the club listed it as "Terra Tomah Peak" in their publication, The Mountain Peaks of Colorado. The mountain's current name was officially adopted by the United States Board on Geographic Names in 1932. David Prescott Barrows, who worked with the Cahuilla and taught the song to the college students, was unable to obtain the meaning of the words. The lake was later named Doughnut Lake, and it lies below the west base of the mountain.

== Climate ==
According to the Köppen climate classification system, Terra Tomah Mountain is located in an alpine subarctic climate zone with cold, snowy winters, and cool to warm summers. Due to its altitude, it receives precipitation all year, as snow in winter, and as thunderstorms in summer, with a dry period in late spring. Precipitation runoff from the mountain drains northeast into the Big Thompson River.

== Gallery ==
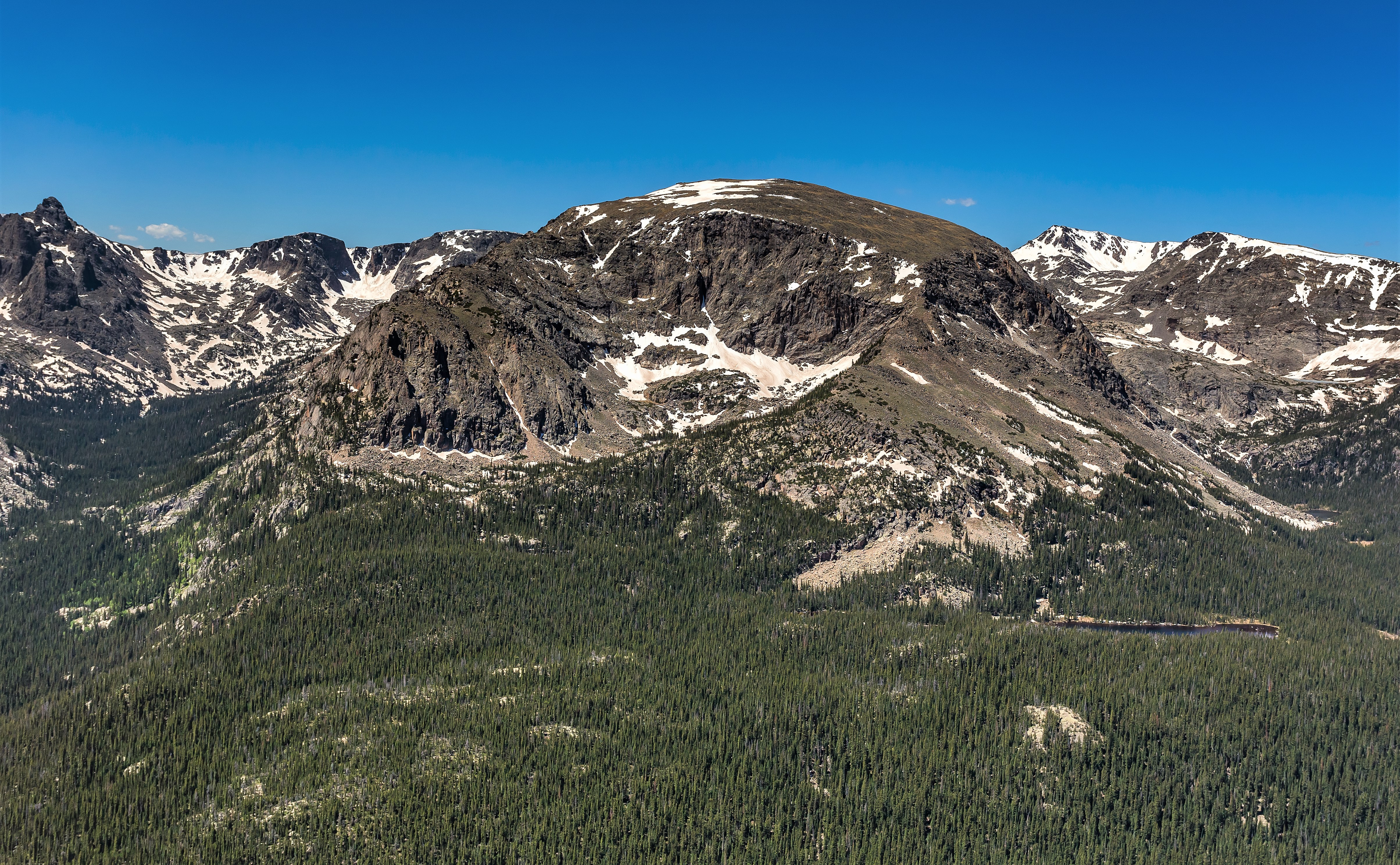
Northeast aspect, from Trail Ridge Road

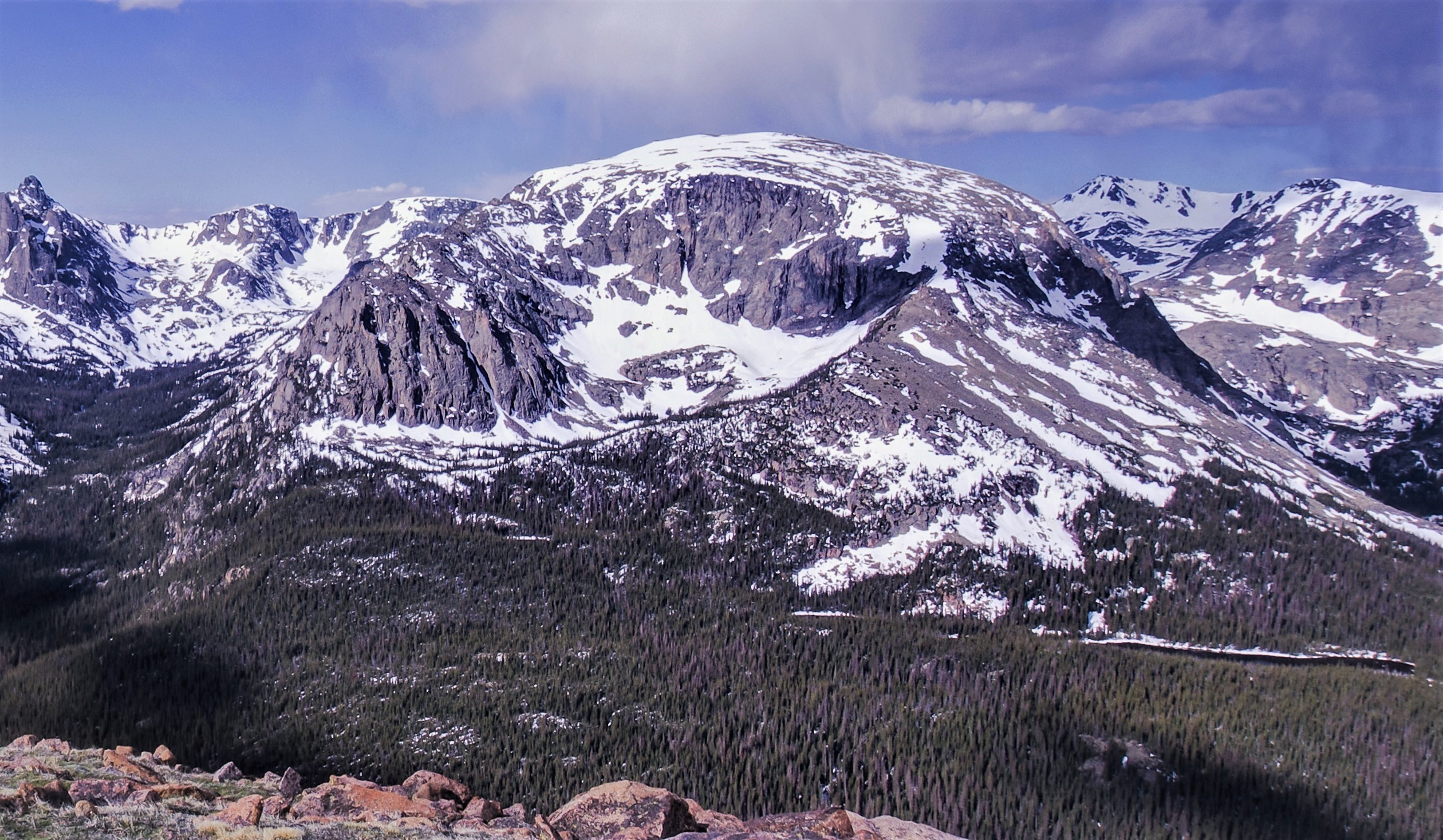

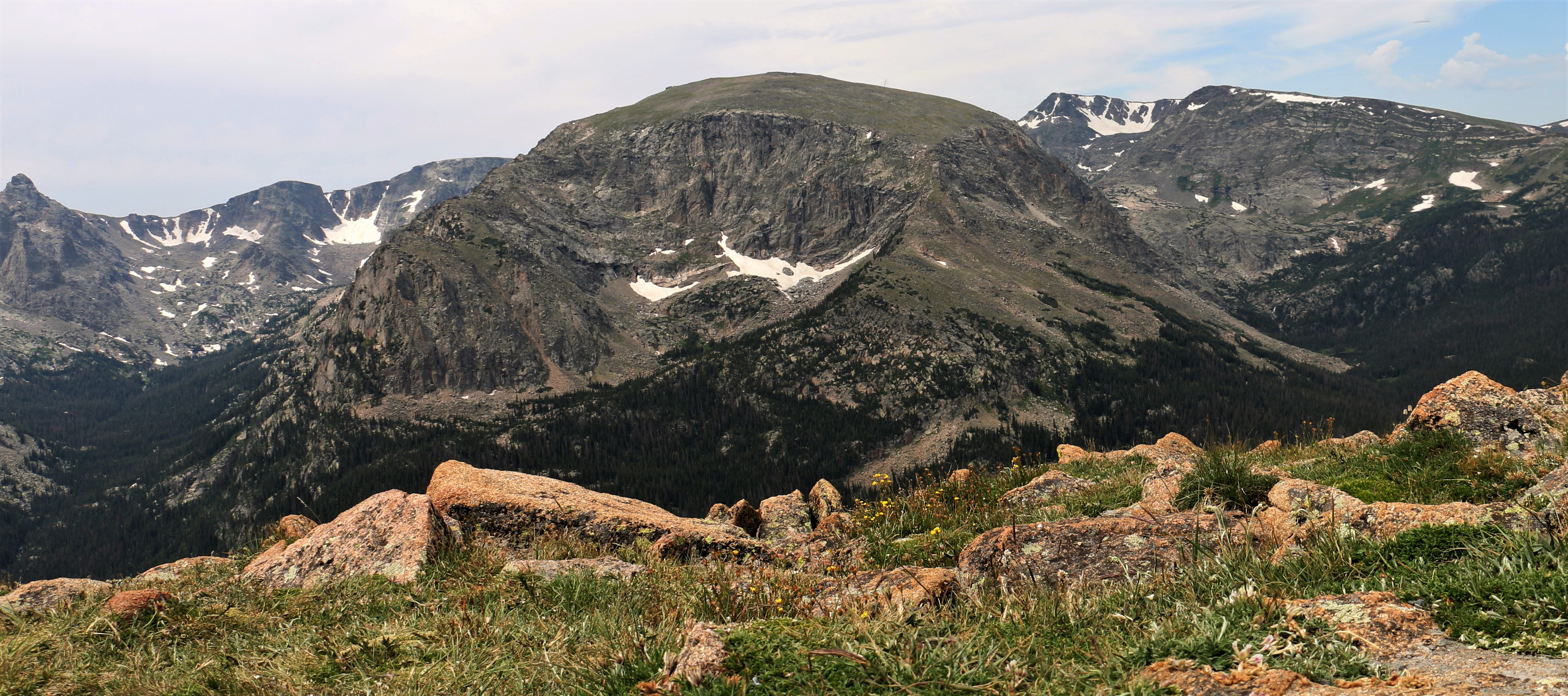

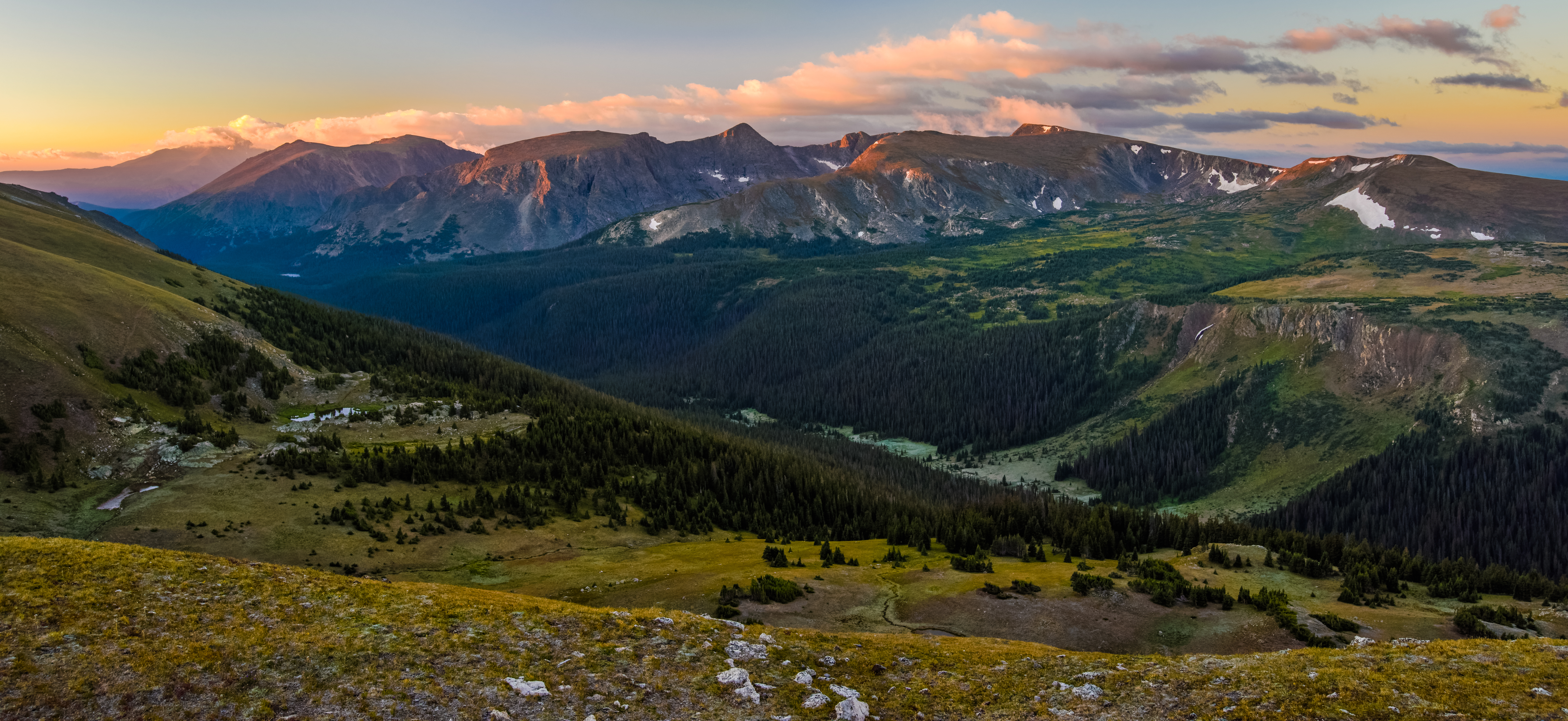
The view of Forest Canyon from Trail Ridge Road at sunrise. Mount Julian centered in the distance with Terra Tomah Mountain left of center. Camera pointed south.

== See also ==
- List of peaks in Rocky Mountain National Park
- Mountains of Larimer County, Colorado
