= Tuxedo (disambiguation) =

A tuxedo is a type of semi-formal jacket for men, usually black or white, properly worn with an evening shirt and a bow tie.

Tuxedo may also refer to:

== Places ==
Canada

- Tuxedo, Winnipeg, Manitoba, a city neighbourhood
  - Tuxedo (electoral district), a provincial electoral district in Manitoba
- Tuxedo Park, Calgary, Alberta, a city neighbourhood

United States

- Tuxedo, Maryland, an unincorporated community
- Tuxedo, North Carolina
- Tuxedo, New York, a town
  - Tuxedo (Metro-North station)
- Tuxedo Park, New York, a town
  - Tuxedo Club, a social club located in the town

== Others ==
- Tuxedo, a funk duo consisting of singer Mayer Hawthorne and producer Jake One which has been active since 2015
- Tuxedo (software), a middleware platform to manage distributed transaction processing
- Tuxedo Computers, a German manufacturer of Linux-compatible computers
- The Tuxedo, a Jackie Chan movie
- Tuxedo (vaudeville), an 1891 vaudeville show
- Tuxedo (bug), a genus of true bugs in the family Miridae
- Tuxedo cat, a coat pattern in bicolor cats
- Tuxedo, a dog coat pattern
- Tuxedo (cocktail)
- Tuxedo mousse cake
- Tuxedos (EP), an EP by Cold War Kids
- "Tuxedo" (Lead song), 2020

== See also ==
- Tuxedo Park (disambiguation)
- "Tuxedo Junction", well-known swing era song
- Tuxedo Mask, a fictional character from the Sailor Moon franchise
- Tux, the fictional mascot of Linux.
