= Mount Julian (Alberta) =

Mountain in Jasper National Park, Alberta, Canada

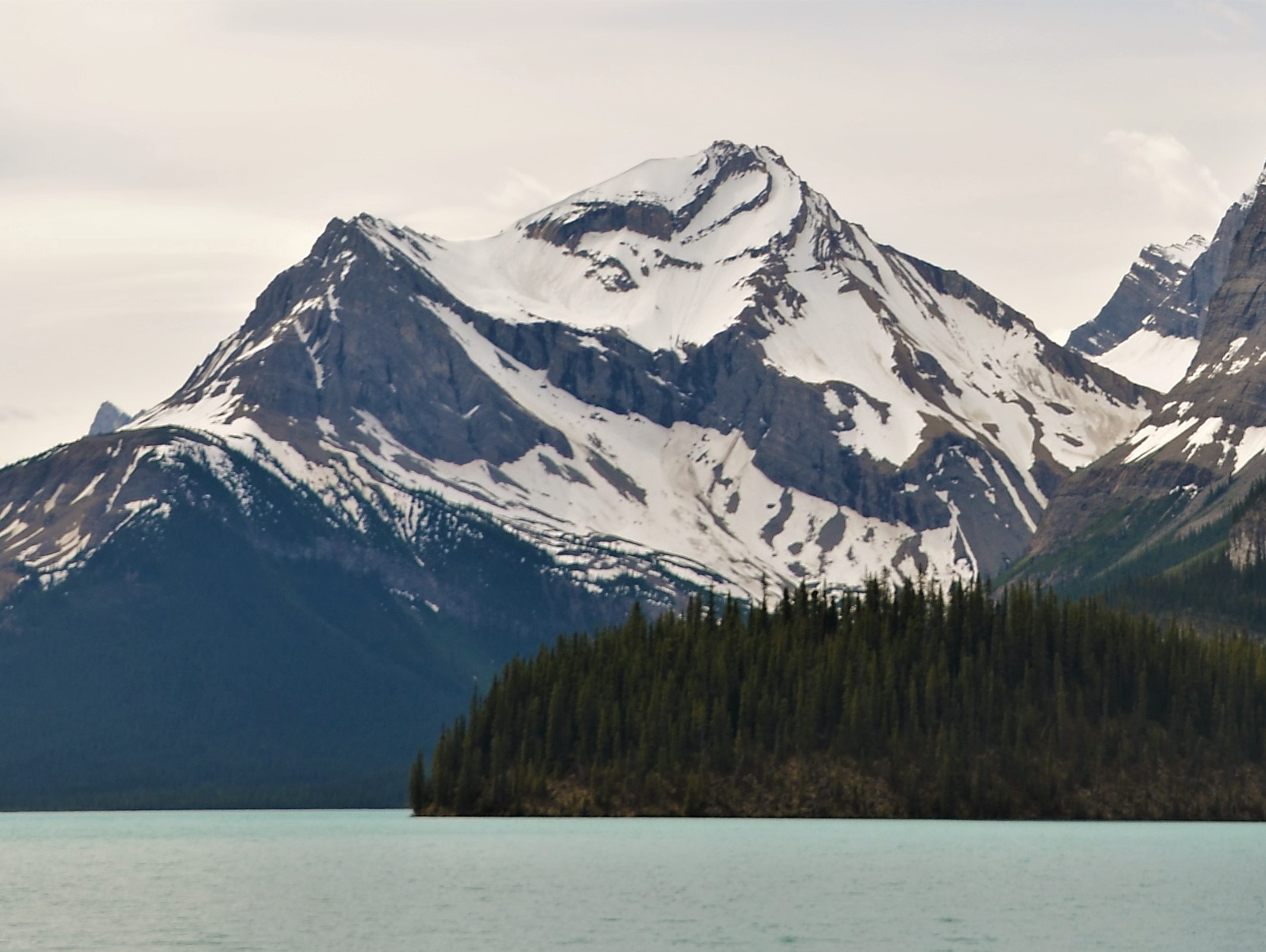
- North aspect

Highest point
- Elevation: 2,769 m (9,085 ft)
- Listing: Mountains of Alberta
- Coordinates: 52°34′20″N 117°26′30″W

Naming
- Etymology: Julian Amery

Geography
- Location within Alberta Location within Canada
- Interactive map of Mount Julian
- Country: Canada
- Province: Alberta
- Protected area: Jasper National Park
- Parent range: Queen Elizabeth Ranges
- Topo map: NTS 83C11 Southesk Lake

Climbing
- First ascent: 1930

Mount Julian is a peak located at the southern end of Maligne Lake in Jasper National Park, Alberta, Canada.

The mountain was named in 1928 by Leo Amery for his son Julian

The mountain was first climbed in 1930 by J.A. Corry, C.G. Crawford, E.M. Gillespie, J. McAuley, M. Percy, R. Rushworth, G. Shanger, and I. Vanderberg.

== Geology ==
Mount Julian is composed of sedimentary rock laid down during the Precambrian to Jurassic periods. Formed in shallow seas, this sedimentary rock was pushed east and over the top of younger rock during the Laramide orogeny.

== Climate ==
Based on the Köppen climate classification, Mount Julian is located in a subarctic climate zone with cold, snowy winters, and mild summers. Winter temperatures can drop below −20 °C with wind chill factors below −30 °C.

== Gallery ==
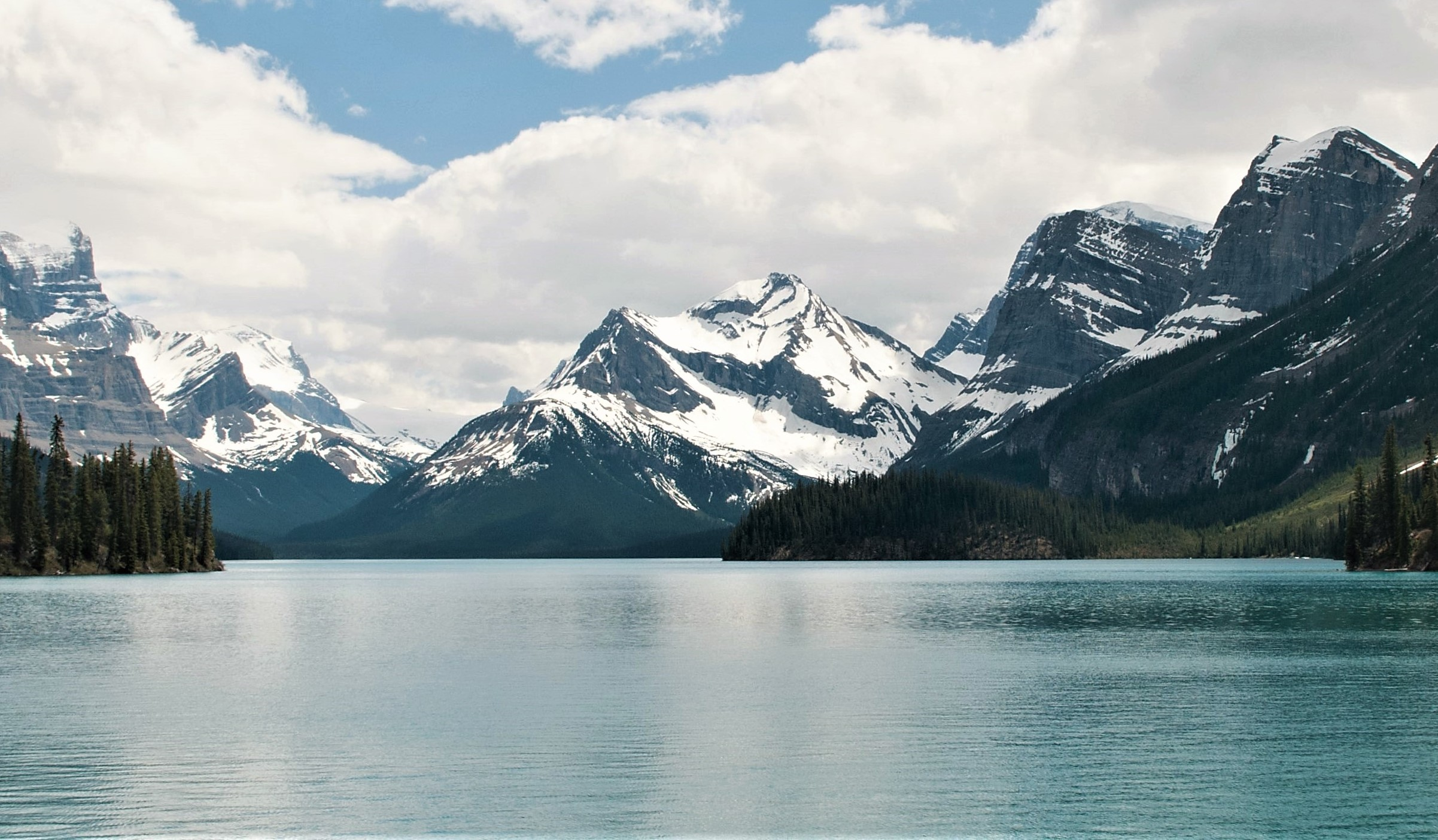
Mt. Julian, centered, from Maligne Lake

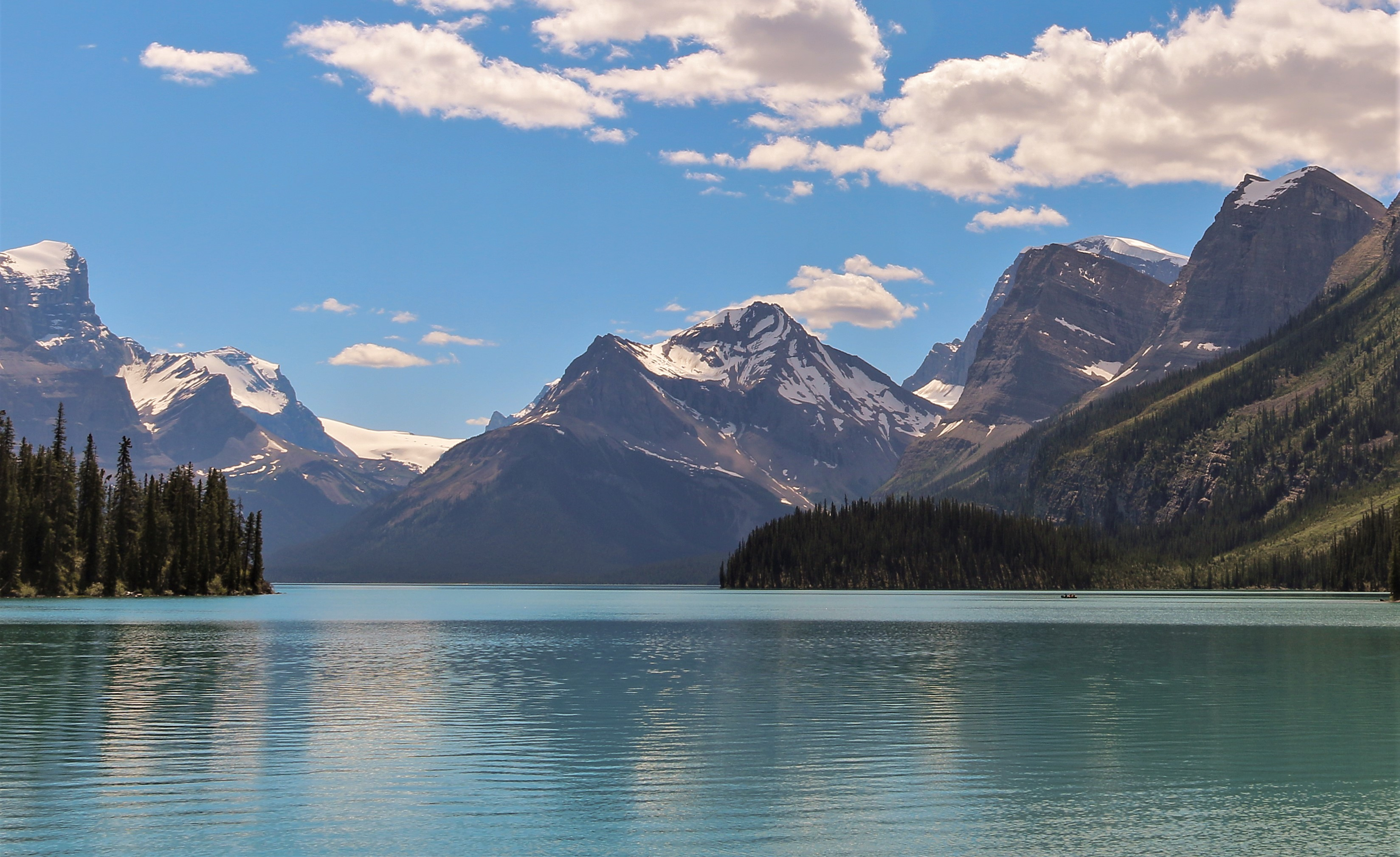
Mt. Julian, centered, from Maligne Lake

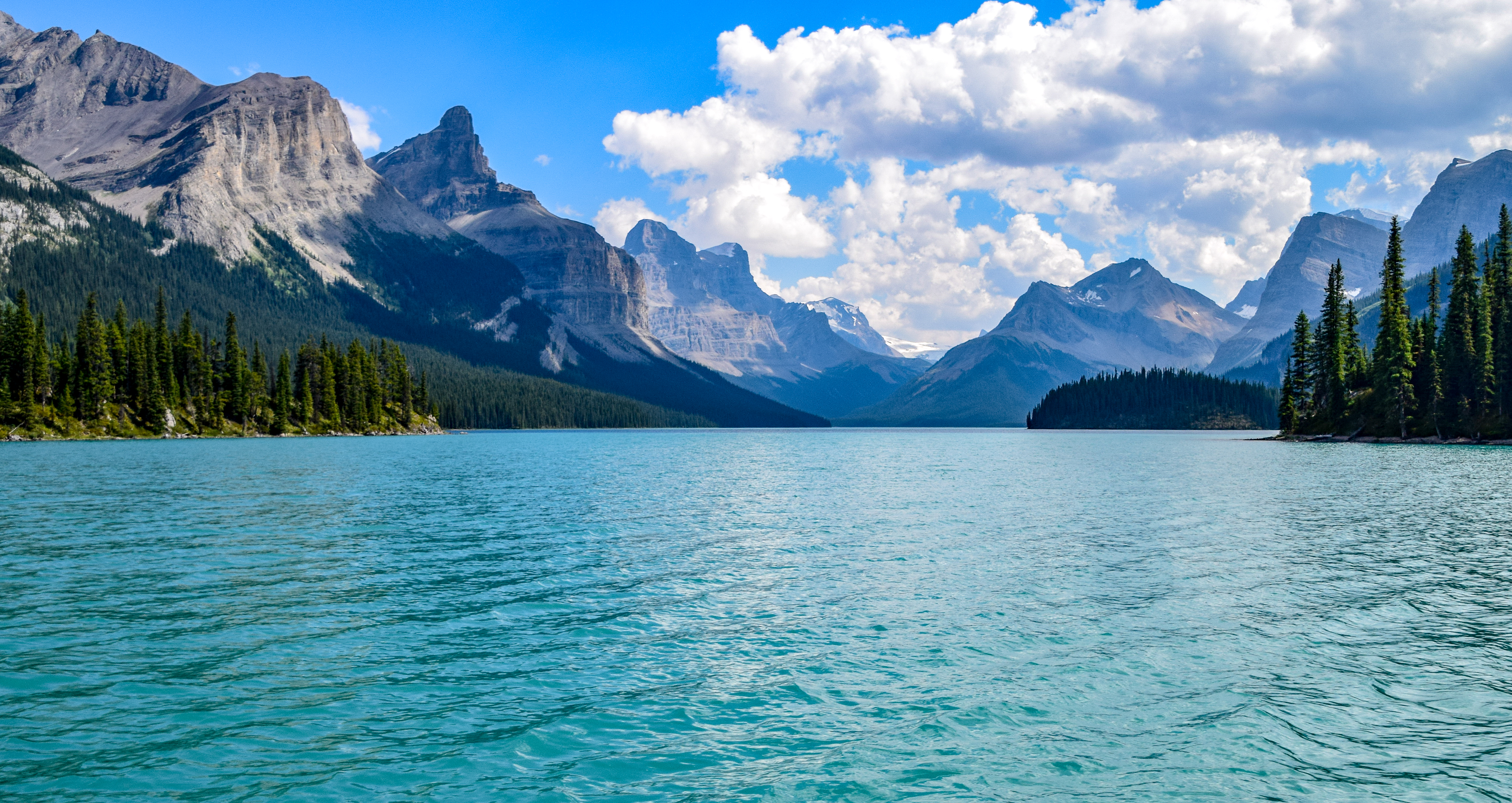
Mt. Julian to right of center

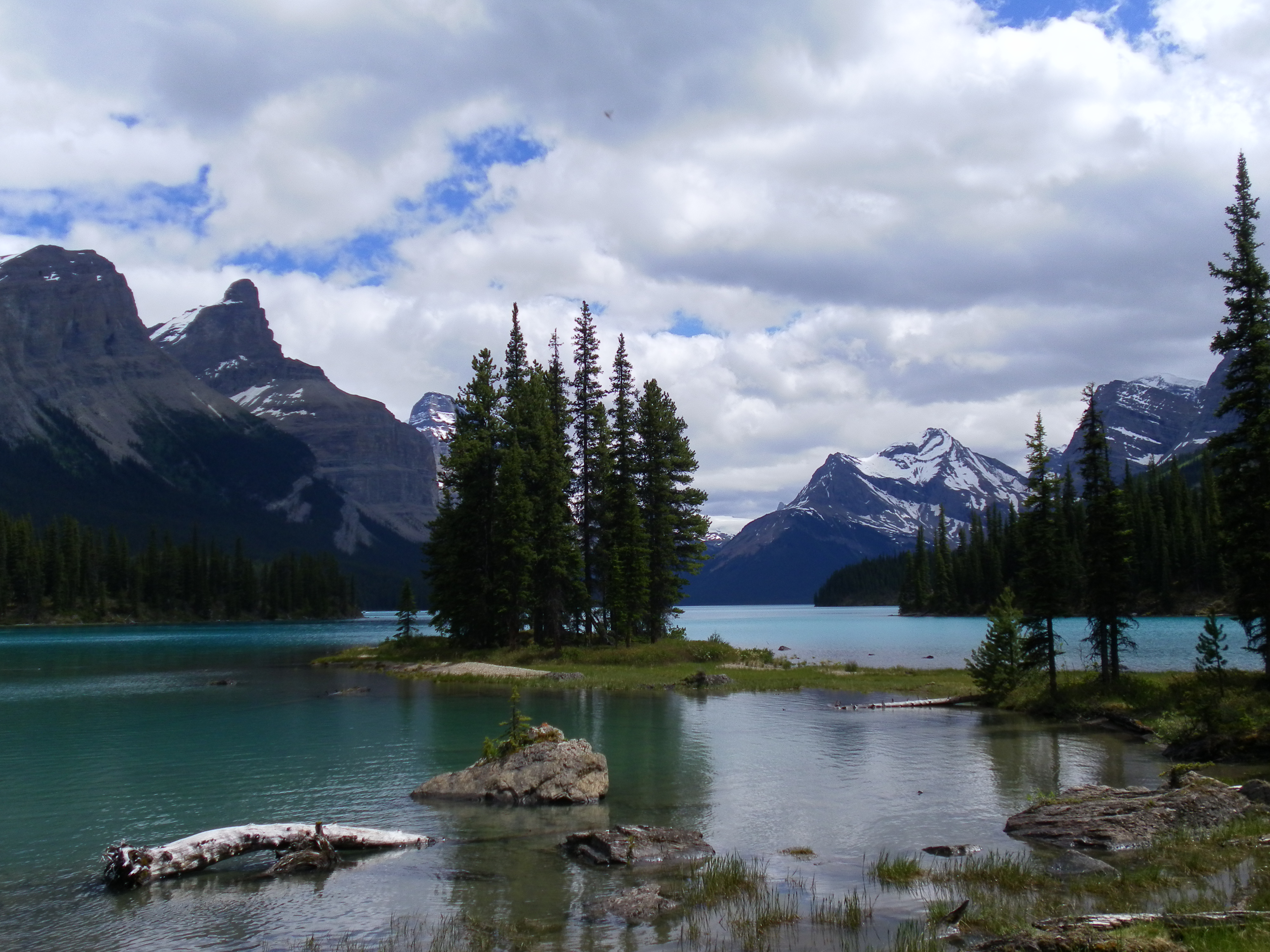
Mount Paul (left), Spirit Island centered, Mount Julian (right)

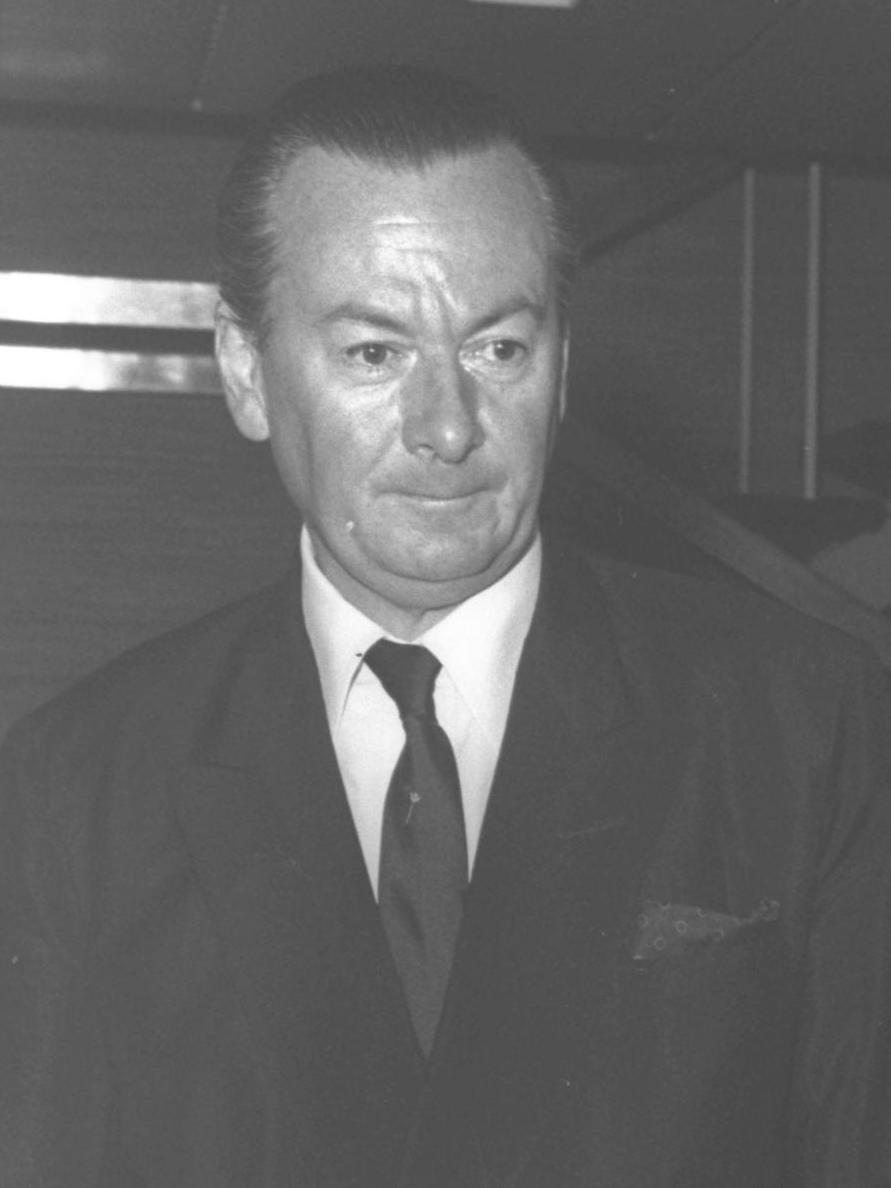
Julian Amery, the mountain's namesake

== See also ==
- Geography of Alberta
