= Sprague Glacier =

Glacier in Colorado, United States

- Location within Colorado
- Type: Mountain glacier
- Location: Larimer County, Colorado, United States
- Coordinates: 40°20′32″N 105°44′00″W
- Terminus: Talus/proglacial lake
- Status: Retreating

Sprague Glacier is a small cirque glacier in Rocky Mountain National Park in the U.S. state of Colorado. Sprague Glacier is on the east side of the Continental Divide and .25 mi (0.40 km) southeast of Sprague Mountain. Several small alpine lakes are near the foot of the glacier.

== See also ==
- List of glaciers in the United States
