= Sprague Lake (Colorado) =

Lake in Larimer County, Colorado, United States

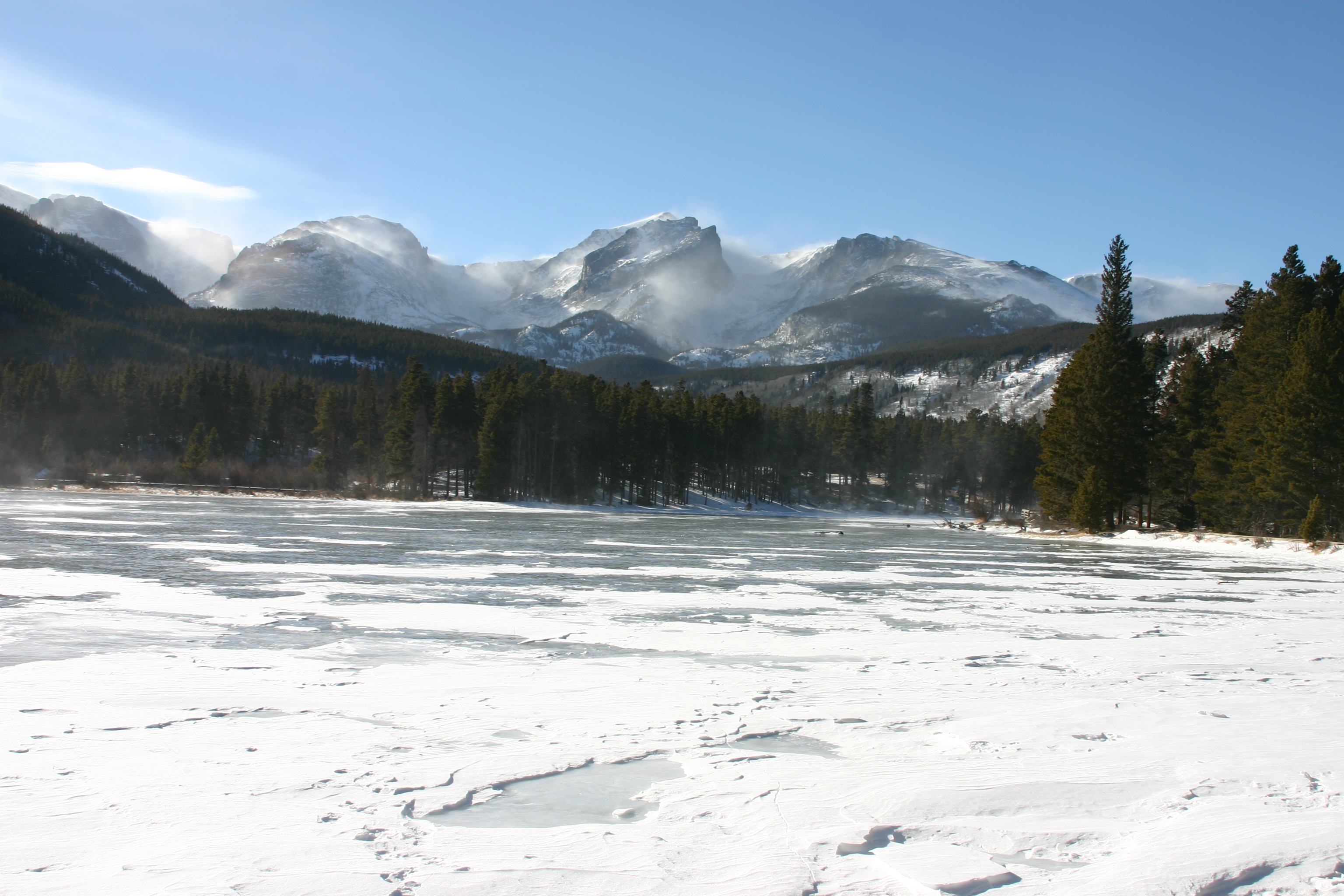
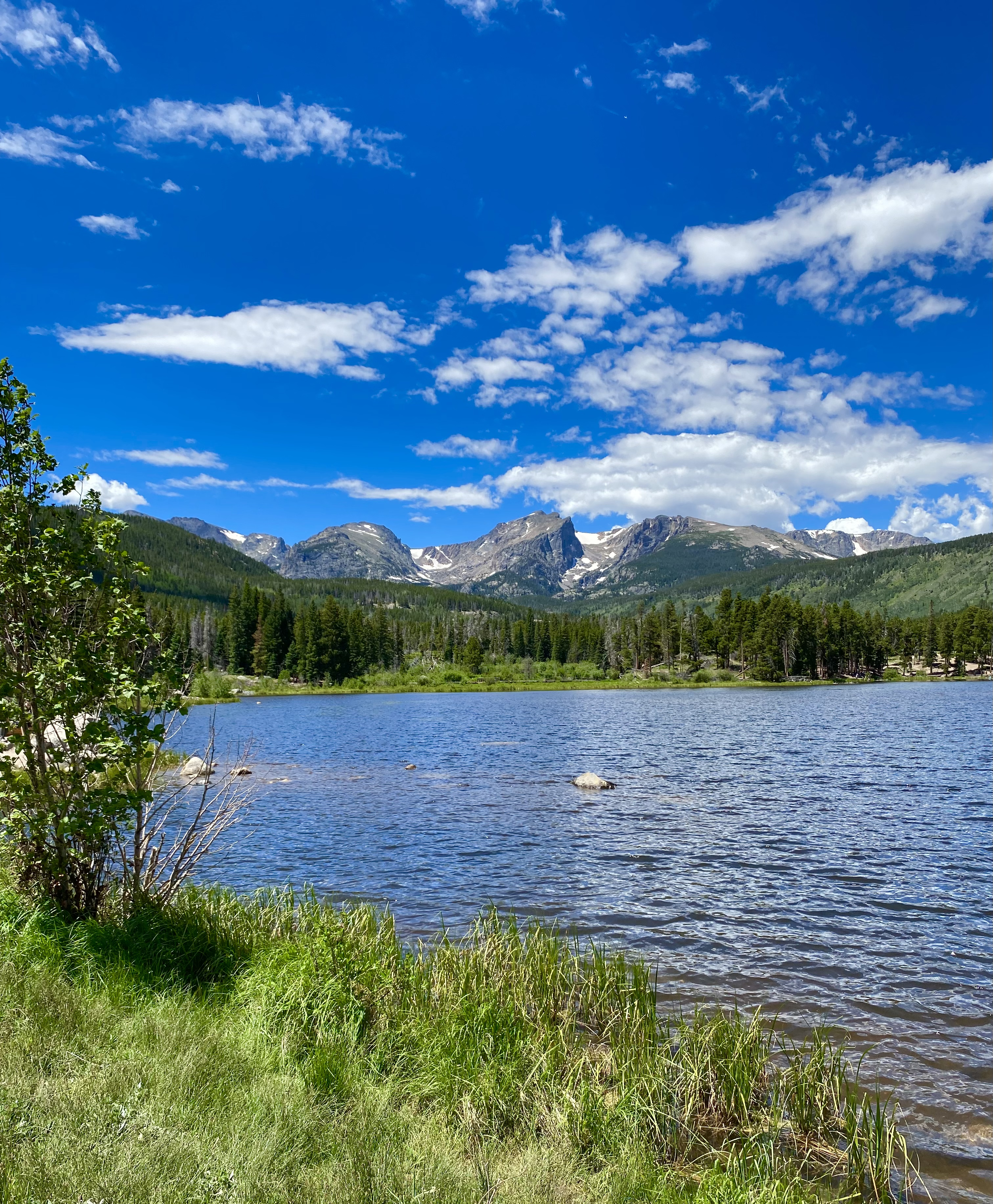
- Winter view (December 2008) Sprague lake summer view (July 2022)

- Location within Colorado Location within the United States
- Location: Colorado
- Coordinates: 40°19′12″N 105°36′17″W
- Basin countries: United States
- Surface elevation: 2,648 m (8,688 ft)

Sprague Lake is a scenic lake in Rocky Mountain National Park, located on the south side of Glacier Creek, about two miles south of the Hollowell turnoff. The half-mile walk around the lake is wheelchair accessible and features boardwalks and bridges with views of Flattop Mountain and Hallet Peak. The lake is popular for Brook trout fishing.

The area is named after Abner E. Sprague, who started a homestead there in 1874. Later, he opened a lodge for dude ranching, hunting, and fishing. To improve the fishing, he dammed the far end of the lake. The area became part of Rocky Mountain National Park in 1915 and continued to serve guests as the Sprague Hotel. In 1919, guests paid $6.00 per room with a private bath, and $1.00 for regular meals. The hotel, which no longer exists, stood near the present-day parking lot.

== See also ==
- Trail Ridge Road
