= Tuxedo Park, Colorado =

Flat in Larimer County, Colorado, United States

Tuxedo Park
- Interactive map of Tuxedo Park
- Location: Rocky Mountain National Park
- Nearest city: Estes Park, Colorado
- Coordinates: 40°20′43.94″N 105°34′47″W

Tuxedo Park is a flat in Rocky Mountain National Park and Larimer County, Colorado at 7,950 feet (2,420 m) in elevation.
