= Mount Julian (Colorado) =

Mountain in Colorado, United States

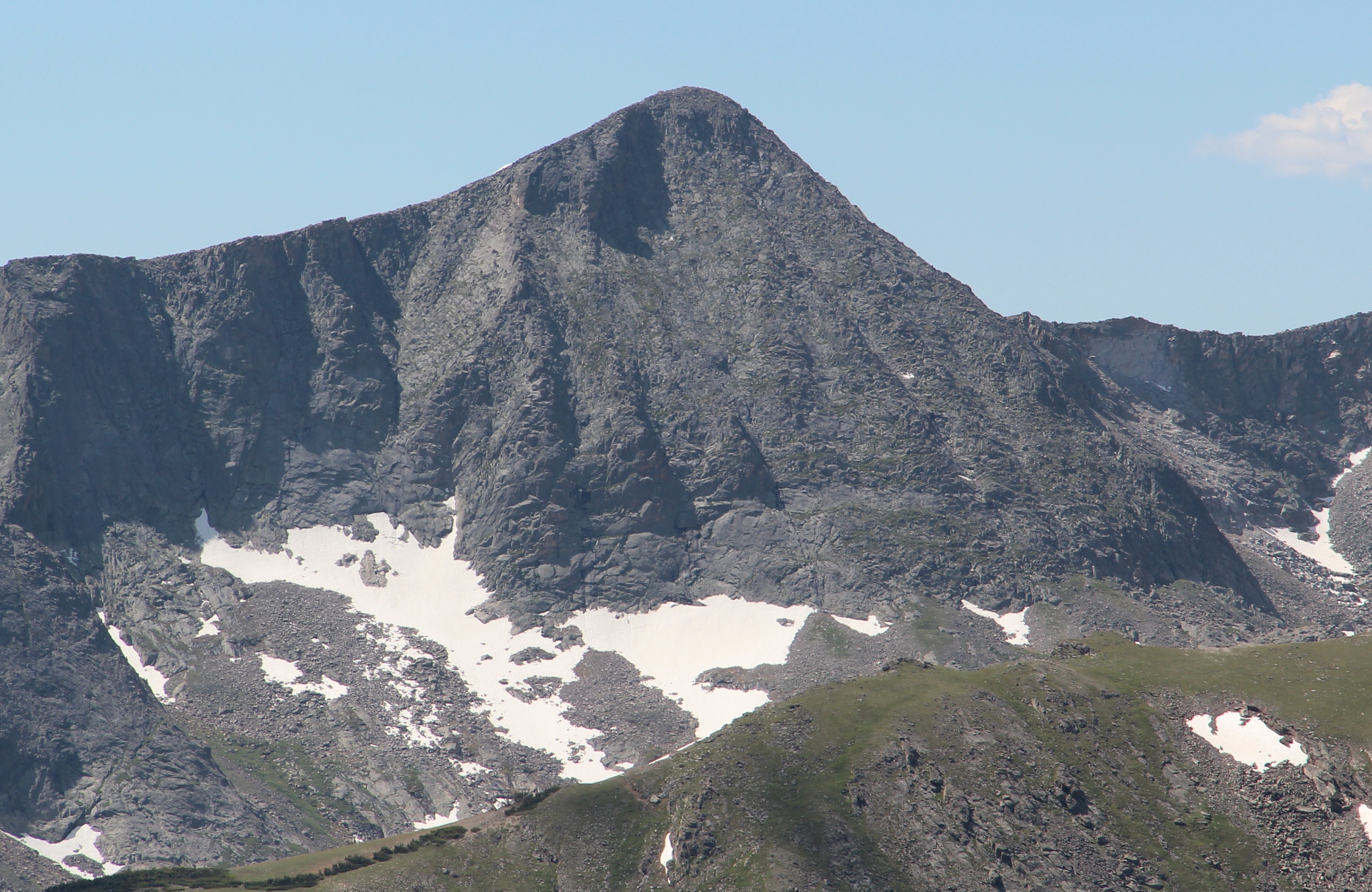
- Mount Julian viewed from Trail Ridge Road

Highest point
- Elevation: 12,933 ft (3,942 m)
- Prominence: 1,220 ft (372 m)
- Isolation: 6.19 mi (9.96 km)
- Coordinates: 40°22′16″N 105°45′27″W

Geography
- Location within Colorado
- Location: Rocky Mountain National Park, Larimer County, Colorado, U.S.
- Parent range: Front Range
- Topo map(s): USGS 7.5' topographic map Grand Lake, Colorado

Climbing
- Easiest route: Scramble

Mount Julian is a mountain summit in the northern Front Range of the Rocky Mountains of North America. The 12,933-foot (3,942 m) peak is located in the Rocky Mountain National Park Wilderness, 12.2 miles (19.7 km) west (bearing 268°) of the Town of Estes Park in Larimer County, Colorado, United States. The mountain was named in honor of Julian Hayden, a civil engineer who lived in Estes Park.

== See also ==
- List of Colorado mountain ranges
- List of Colorado mountain summits
  - List of Colorado fourteeners
  - List of Colorado 4000 meter prominent summits
  - List of the most prominent summits of Colorado
- List of Colorado county high points
