= List of mountain men =

This is a list of explorers, trappers, guides, and other frontiersmen known as "Mountain Men". Mountain men are most associated with trapping for beaver from 1807 to the 1840s in the Rocky Mountains of the United States. Most moved on to other endeavors, but a few of them followed or adopted the mountain man life style into the 20th century.

== List ==
| Name | DOB–DOD | Years active | Native Country | Comments |
|---|---|---|---|---|
| Albert, John | 1806–1899 | 1834–1847 | United States | |
| Ashley, William Henry | 1778–1838 | 1822–1828 | United States | |
| Baker, Jim | 1818–1898 | 1839–1873 | United States | |
| Barclay, Alex | 1810–1855 | 1838–1855 | | Barclay was a British-born frontiersman of the American West. After working in St. Louis as a bookkeeper and clerk, he worked at Bent's Old Fort. He then ventured westward where he was a trapper, hunter, and trader. |
| Beckwourth, Jim | 1798–1866 | 1824–1866 | United States | |
| Bent, Charles | 1799–1847 | 1828–1846 | United States | |
| Bent, William | 1809–1869 | 1826–1869 | United States | |
| Biggs, Thomas | 1812–1855 | 1835–1855 | United States | |
| Beaver, Black | 1806–1880 | | United States | |
| Bridger, Jim | 1804–1881 | 1822–1868 | United States | |
| Bissonet dit Bijou, Joseph | 1778–1836 | 1812–1836 | France | |
| Bissonette, Joseph | 1818–1894 | | | |
| Bonneville, Benjamin | 1796–1878 | 1832–1835 | France | Washington Irving wrote about him, making him famous in his lifetime. The Bonneville Salt Flats are named after him. |
| Brown, John | 1817–1889 | 1841–1849 | United States | Fur trapper, trader, rancher, and merchant in and around Pueblo, Colorado. |
| Brown, Kootenay | 1839–1916 | 1862–1910 | Ireland | |
| Richard Campbell | | 1824– | United States | Led first trapper party (from Taos) to sell beaver pelts in California, 1827 |
| Campbell, Robert | 1804–1879 | 1825–1835 | Ireland | |
| Carson, Kit | 1809–1868 | 1825–1868 | United States | Carson became a frontier legend in his own lifetime through news articles and dime novels. |
| Charbonneau, Jean | 1805–1866 | 1829–1866 | United States | An American Métis, son of Sacagawea and her French-Canadian husband, Toussaint Charbonneau. |
| Clyman, James | 1792–1880 | 1823–1848 | United States | |
| Coulter, John | 1774–1813 | 1803–1810 | United States | During the winter of 1807–1808, he explored the area that is now Yellowstone and the Tetons. He is widely considered to be the first mountain man. |
| Craig, Bill | 1807–1869 | | United States | |
| Culbertson, Alexander | 1809–1879 | 1829–1858, 1868–1878 | | |
| Drips, Andrew | 1789–1860 | | | |
| Drouillard, George | 1774–1810 | 1804–1810 | United States | |
| Ebbert, George | 1810–1890 | 1823–1836 | United States | |
| Estes, Joel | 1806–1875 | 1833–1875 | United States | Founder of Estes Park Colorado, a frontiersman, hunter, fur trader, explorer, gold prospector, and mountain man. |
| Ferris, Warren | 1810–1873 | | United States | |
| Finlay, Jocko | 1768–1828 | 1806–1828 | Canada | |
| Fallon, LeGros | d. 1848 | 1826–1848 | United States | Real name: William O. Fallon |
| Fitzpatrick, Thomas "Broken Hand" | 1799–1854 | | Ireland | |
| Fraeb, Henry | d. 1841 | 1829–1841 | | |
| Fontenelle, Lucien | 1800–1840 | 1819–1840 | | |
| Garcia, Andrew | 1853–1943 | | United States | |
| Glass, Hugh | 1780–1833 | 1800–1833 | | |
| Godin, Antoine | 1805–1836 | 1817–1836 | Canada | |
| Goodyear, Miles | 1817–1849 | 1836–1847 | United States | |
| Graham, Isaac | 1800–1863 | 1830–1840 | United States | |
| Greenwood, Caleb | 1763–1850 | 1810–1834 | United States | |
| Hamilton, Bill | 1822–1908 | | | |
| Harris, Moses | 1800–1849 | | United States | He is also known as Black Harris, and to a lesser extent Black Squire and Major Harris. |
| Helm, Boone | 1828–1864 | 1850–1864 | United States | |
| Henry, Andrew | 1775–1832 | 1809–1824 | United States | |
| Jackson, David | 1788–1837 | 1822–1832 | United States | |
| Janis, Antoine | 1822–1890 | 1836–1858 | | |
| Kinman, Seth | 1815–1888 | 1849–1864 | United States | American gold prospector of the California Gold Rush turn mountain man who hunted down a bear and made it into a chair for Abraham Lincoln in his present a presidential chair. |
| Kirker, James | 1793–1852 | 1822–1849 | Ireland | |
| Leonard, Zenas | 1809–1857 | 1831–1857 | United States | |
| Leroux, Antoine | 1803–1861 | 1822–1861 | United States | |
| Johnson, Liver-Eating | 1824–1900 | | United States | Real name: John Jeremiah Garrison Johnston |
| Lilly, Ben | 1856–1936 | | United States | |
| Lisa, Manuel | 1772–1820 | 1789–1820 | | |
| Lupton, Lancaster | 1807–1885 | 1835–1844 | United States | |
| Medina, Mariano | 1812–1878 | | United States | Born in Taos, New Mexico, Medina settled in the Big Thompson Valley in 1858, establishing Fort Namaqua and the Namaqua settlement, now within Loveland, Colorado. He operated a trading post, stage station, and toll bridge. |
| Meek, Joe | 1810–1875 | 1828–1850 | United States | |
| Meek, Stephen | 1805–1889 | 1827–1889 | United States | |
| Moore, Bear | 1850–1924 | Real name: James Moore | United States | |
| Newell, Doc | 1807–1869 | 1829–1869 | | |
| Nidever, George | 1802–1883 | 1830–1853 | United States | |
| Ogden, Pete | 1794–1854 | 1809–1847 | Canada | |
| Osborne Russell | 1814- 1884 | 1834-1843 | United States | Osborne Russell Russell, Osborne (1921). Journal of a Trapper: Nine Years in the Rocky Mountains (1834-1843). Boise, Idaho: Symes-York Company. p. 31. |
| Pattie, James Ohio | 1804–1851? | 1824–1830 | United States | |
| Perkins, “Moccasin Bill” | 1825–1904 | 1860–1904 | United States | William Henry Perkins (Not to be confused with Buffalo Bill. Not to be confused with Moccasin Bill, Cunning Serpent of Ojibwah") |
| Provost, Etienne | 1785–1850 | 1822–1830 | Canada | |
| Rose, Edward | 1780–1833 | 1807–1833 | United States | |
| Russell, Osborne | 1814–1892 | 1834–1845 | United States | |
| Paxton, George | 1821–1848 | | United Kingdom | |
| Purcell, James | | fl. 1802–? | United States | |
| Sage, Rufus | 1817–1893 | 1841–1844 | United States | |
| Smith, Jedediah | 1799–1831 | 1822–1831 | United States | |
| Smith, John Simpson | 1810–1871 | 1830–1871 | United States | Uncle John, Blackfoot Smith |
| Smith, Pegleg | 1801–1866 | | United States | |
| Straw, Nat | 1857–1941 | | | |
| Stevens, Montague | 1859–1953 | | United Kingdom | |
| St. Vrain, Ceran | 1802–1870 | | United States | |
| Sublette, Milton | 1801–1837 | 1823–1835 | United States | |
| Sublette, Bill | 1799–1845 | 1823–1832 | United States | |
| Tevanitagon, Pierre | ?–1828 | 1822–1828 | Canada | An Iroquois from Quebec |
| Tobin, Tom | 1823–1904 | 1837–1878 | United States | |
| Trask, Elbridge | 1815–1863 | 1835–1852 | United States | |
| Turner, John | 1807 | 1847 | United States | Turner survived three Native American massacres, one in 1827 on the Colorado River with the Jedediah Smith expedition, one in 1828 with Smith on the Umpquah River, and one in 1835 on the Rogue River. He later used his survival skills to lead the second round of the Donner Party rescue effort. |
| Vasquez, Lou | 1798–1868 | 1723–1858 | | |
| Walker, Joe | 1798–1876 | 1832–1863 | United States | |
| Weaver, Pauline | 1797–1867 | 1830–1867 | United States | His given name Powell was changed to the more-familiar to Spanish speakers Paulino, which in turn was changed to Pauline by English speakers |
| Weber, John | 1779–1859 | 1822–1840 | Germany | |
| Wetzel, Lewis | 1752–1808 | 1786–1791 | United States | |
| Williams, Old Bill | 1787–1849 | 1812–1849 | United States | |
| Wooten, Dick | 1816–1893 | | United States | |
| Wyeth, Nathaniel | 1802–1856 | 1832–1837 | United States | |
| Yount, Harry | 1839–1924 | 1866–1924 | United States | |
