= History of Rocky Mountain National Park =

History of Rocky Mountain National Park began when Paleo-Indians traveled along what is now Trail Ridge Road to hunt and forage for food. Ute and Arapaho people subsequently hunted and camped in the area. In 1820, the Long Expedition, led by Stephen H. Long for whom Longs Peak was named, approached the Rockies via the Platte River. Settlers began arriving in the mid-1800s, displacing the Native Americans who mostly left the area voluntarily by 1860, while others were removed to reservations by 1878.

Lulu City, Dutchtown, and Gaskill in the Never Summer Mountains were established in the 1870s when prospectors came in search of gold and silver. The boom ended by 1883 with miners deserting their claims. The railroad reached Lyons, Colorado in 1881 and the Big Thompson Canyon Road—a section of U.S. Route 34 from Loveland to Estes Park—was completed in 1904. The 1920s saw a boom in building lodges and roads in the park, culminating with the construction of Trail Ridge Road to Fall River Pass between 1929 and 1932, then to Grand Lake by 1938.

Prominent individuals in the effort to create a national park included Enos Mills from the Estes Park area, James Grafton Rogers from Denver, and J. Horace McFarland of Pennsylvania. The national park was established on January 26, 1915.

== Early history ==
=== Paleo-Indians ===
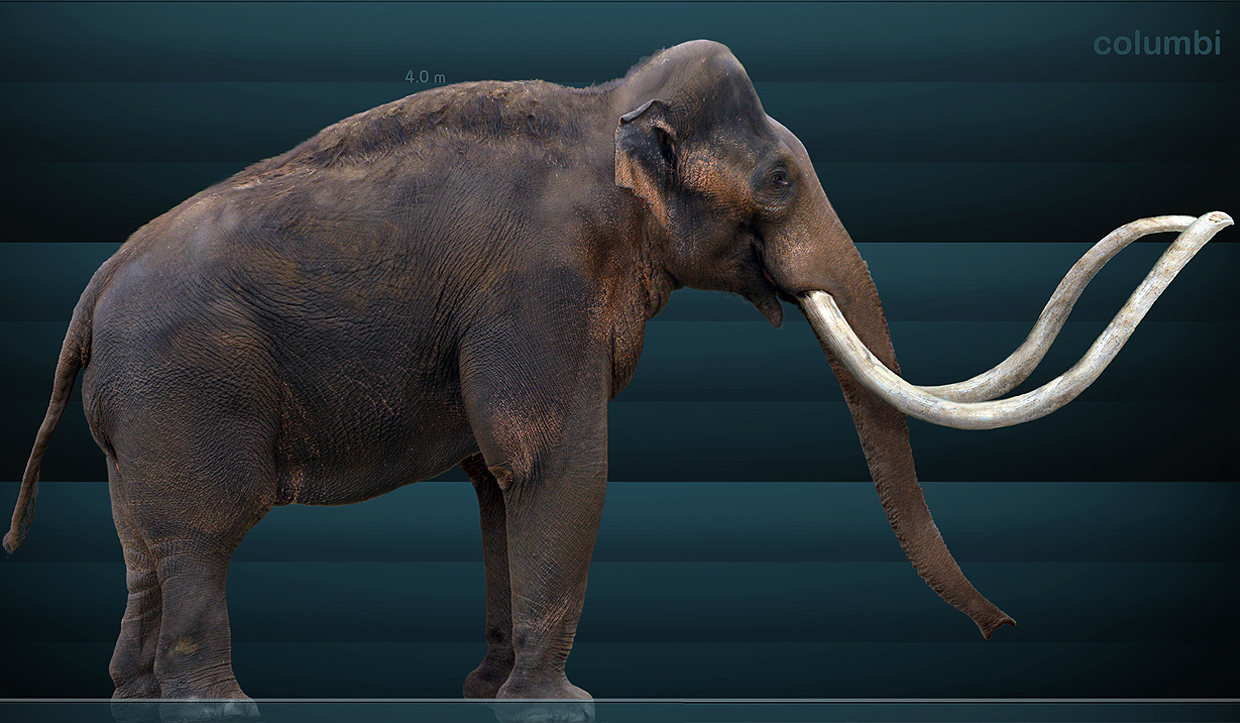
Restoration of a Columbian Mammoth

People have been visiting the area near Rocky Mountain National Park for at least 11,000 years, including the Lindenmeier and Dent sites where projectile points were found that were used to hunt Mammoth and Bison antiquus. Both Clovis and Folsom projectile points have been found in the park, some near Trail Ridge. This indicates that there were early hunters, or Paleo-Indians, of large and now extinct mammals, like mastodons and bison antiquus, that traveled through the park. Their shelters were animal hide tents, brush huts, or rock shelters. They traveled into the Rocky Mountain National Park area using a trail that is now Trail Ridge Road.

The Paleo-Indians began hunting smaller, modern bison and looked for many sources of food in nature when they adopted the lifestyle of the Archaic period about eight thousand years ago. Projectile points have been found at Fall River Pass, on Flattop Mountain, at Forest Canyon Pass, on a slope above Chapin Pass, near Oldman Mountain, and other places in the park. Archeologist Wilfred M. Husted said, "Evidence indicates intermittent occupation of the Park rather than continuous occupation. Travel back and forth across the Continental Divide was the primary reason why Indians entered the mountains. Small camps indicate seasonal hunting in the valleys and on the mountains."

Within the park there are archeological remains from about 3,850 to 3,400 B.C. of 42 low-walled stone structures or cairns, up to hundreds of feet in length, built for game drive systems. Remains of such structures were found on Mount Ida, Tombstone Ridge, and on Trail Ridge Road. These slight walls served as devices that permitted hunters to direct or herd game animals—like bison, sheep, deer, or elk— toward men waiting with weapons. Up to twenty-five people may have been needed to execute the game drive. Hunters may have killed the animals using darts, atlatl, spear throwers, or spears tipped with stone projectile points. A game drive sites was used in this timeframe in an alpine area south of the park (like Mount Albion complex). Since they were temporary camping sites, it was assumed that people still came to the area to hunt and did not live in the mountainous region during the winter.

Bows and arrows were used to hunt animals by 400 to 650 A.D., and pottery pieces have been found in the park that are dated to this period of time. The Paleo-Indians also continued to use game drives to hunt for meat until about 1000 AD. As hunter-gatherers, they also foraged for roots and berries for sustenance.

=== Native Americans ===
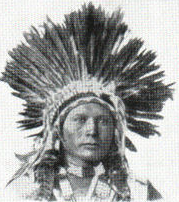
Ute man

Between 1000 and 1300 AD, Ute people moved into the Rocky Mountain and western slope areas of Colorado, perhaps from the Great Basin of Utah. The Ute, who were hunter-gatherers, traveled along Ute trail. Their belongings were carried by the Utes or were pulled by dogs with travois, until they had horses. The Utes camped in bands or small family groupings and stayed in the park area during the summer months and in Estes Park for the winter. Their diet included bison, elk, bighorn sheep, jackrabbit, antelope, deer, berries and roots. When food was scarce, they ate tree bark. In the early 1800s, the Arapaho pushed the Utes out of Estes Park.

In the early 1800s, the northern Arapaho entered into the Rocky Mountain regions of Colorado. At first, they sought lodgepole pines for their tepees from the Kawuneeche Valley. They then spent more time in the Estes Park and surrounding area. The Arapaho also pressed for access to the North Park, Middle Park, and South Park areas, which had been controlled by the Utes. There was a significant battle between the Arapaho and Ute at Grand Lake in which Ute women and children paddled a raft out to the middle of the lake for safety, but were drowned during a sudden storm.

An old Arapaho camp was located at Marys Lake. They had names for many of the sites within the park, often based upon an event or residing animals, which was published in Arapaho Names and Trails. The Arapaho left before 1860 when the area was settled by people of European descent. By 1878, the northern Arapaho were forced into a reservation at Wind River Indian Reservation.

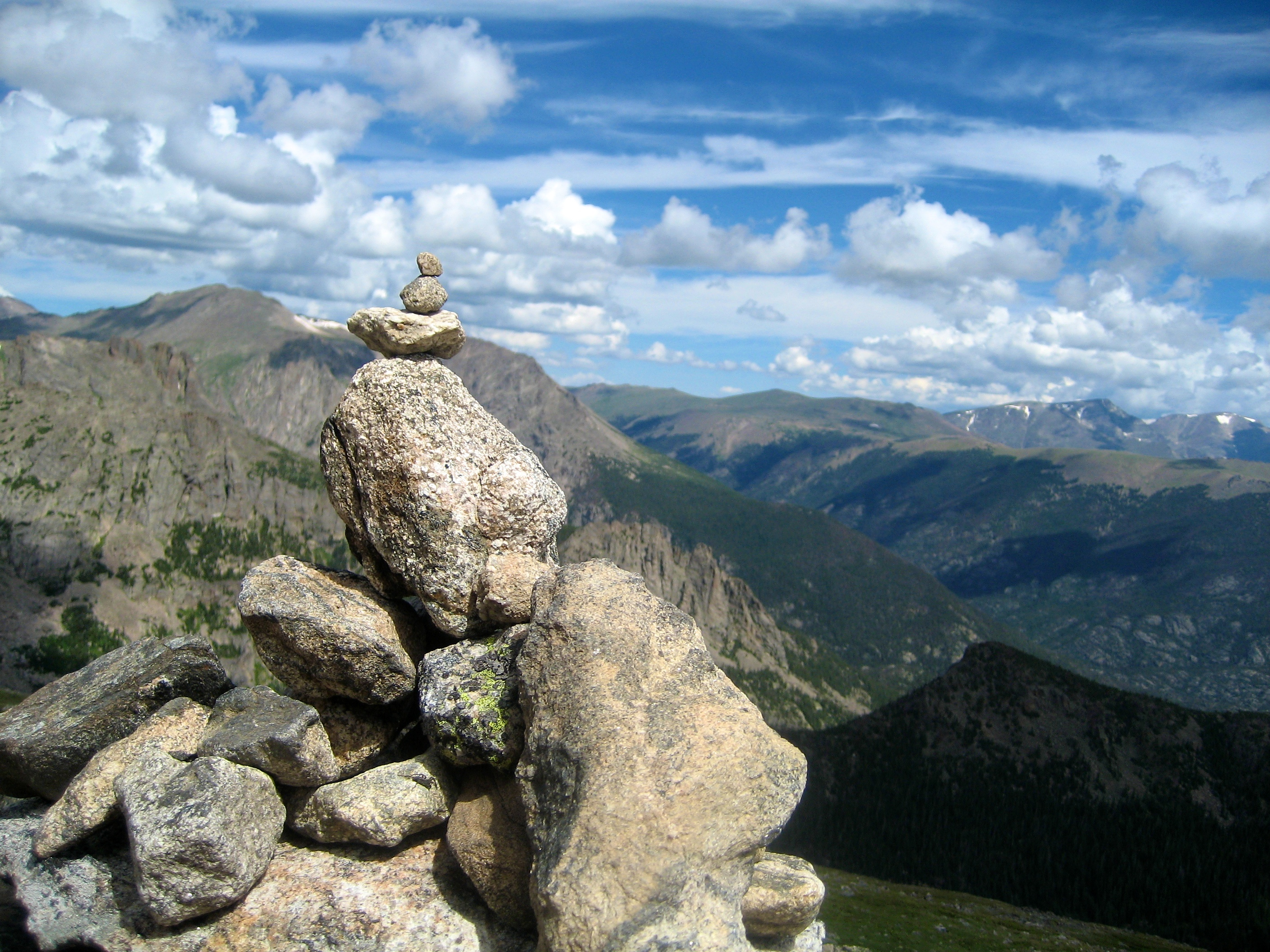
An example of a modern cairn at Flattop Mountain

There were three main trails used by the Ute and Arapaho people to travel between Middle Park and Estes Park. One was called Dog Trail, because the Arapaho had dogs pull travois over the snowy trail, is now called Fall River trail. Child's trail has a spot where children had to get off their horses due to the steep terrain; that trail is now Ute Trail and Trail Ridge Road. Big Trail, which went over Flattop Mountain to the Kawuneeche Valley, was used by fast-traveling warriors. Stone cairns were used by the Arapahos and the Utes to mark the forest trails.

There are hundreds of sites with evidence of Native American visits, including Tepee rings found along the Thompson River and other signs of summer camps. Stone and bone tools used for hunting, butchering, processing hides, and cooking have been found in the park. Additionally, Native Americans carried river boulders to the top of Oldman Mountain, the site of their ceremonial vision quests.

The Apache, Cheyenne, Sioux, and Shoshone periodically hunted or raided the area. Comanche people may have also hunted in the Rocky Mountains for hundreds of years.

== 19th-century explorers and settlers ==
Little has been recorded of Europeans who might have seen or visited the Rocky Mountain National Park area before the 19th century. French fur trappers visited in 1700s and gave Native Americans firearms in trades. A couple of French trappers called Longs Peak and Mount Meeker Les Deux Oreilles ("two ears") in 1799. Don Pedro de Villasur led a group of one hundred men from New Spain up the South Platte River into Nebraska and may have seen the Front Range of Colorado. The Spaniards were attacked by unfriendly Pawnees, who killed 88 of the men, and the Spanish lost interest in traveling so far north again.

American fur trappers came to Colorado in the early 19th century, but were seen as trespassers. James Pursley was trapping in the area, and he spotted gold in 1805. Joseph Bijeau—who was later a guide for the Long expedition—lived, hunted and trapped in the Rockies for six years. There were other trappers who worked along the Front Range. A. P. Chouteau and Julius De Munn traded with Native Americans for furs from 1811 to 1817, but were subject to having the furs they had acquired confiscated by Spanish patrols. Besides the threat of running into Spanish military patrols, the men were also subject to hostile Native American tribes.

=== Long Expedition ===
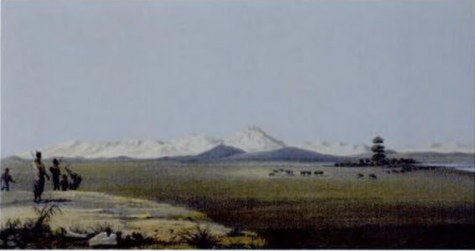
Samuel Seymour, Longs Peak, 1820. Seymour, a member of Long's expedition, made a painting the first known depiction of the peak.

Stephen Harriman Long of the U.S. Army Corps of Engineers, was engaged by President James Madison in 1819 to lead an expedition into the western frontier to document the topography, fauna, and flora encountered on the voyage to the headwaters of the Arkansas, Red River, and Platte Rivers. The expeditionary team (Note: Long, a topographical engineer, led a crew of 19, which included Titian Peale, a naturalist and artist; Samuel Seymour, a landscape painter; Thomas Say, a zoologist, and Edwin James, a physician, geologist, and botanist. They were led by three French guides, including Joseph Bijeau who had lived, hunted, and trapped furs in the Rockies for six years.) moved westward from the plains, following the South Fork of the Platte River towards the mountains and on the western horizon saw what Long identified the "highest peak" on June 30, 1820. (Note: The U S Corps of Topographical Engineers said that the group named the summit Longs Peak for their leader. McDonald states that Long identified the "highest peak". and it was not known as Longs Peak until 1825 when the name was used on maps.) By 1825, the name Longs Peak began appearing on maps.

=== Rufus B. Sage ===
Rufus B. Sage traveled to the mountains in September 1843 and is believed to be the first white man to enter Estes Park. For a month, he hunted the abundant wildlife. Sage described the area as a "concentration of beautiful lateral valleys, intersected by meandering watercourses, ridged by lofty ledges of precipitous rock, and hemmed in on the west by vast piles of mountains climbing beyond clouds." At the time of his visit, Ute and Arapaho lived in the area. Sage published the earliest known description in Rocky Mountain Life, or Startling Scenes and Perilous Adventures in the Far West During an Expedition of Three Years. He was one of the first people to write about the fur trapper's experiences in the vicinity.

After the Mexican–American War (1846–1848) and during the gold rush, more people began to travel westward to the Rockies.

=== Joel Estes ===
We stood on the mountain looking down at the headwaters of Little Thompson Creek, where the Park spread out before us. No words can describe our surprise, wonder and joy at beholding such an unexpected sight.

—Milton Estes said about their October 15, 1859 discovery.

In October 1859, while on a hunting expedition, Joel Estes and his son Milton discovered land where "no signs that white men had ever been there before us." In 1860, Joel Estes moved his family—which had included his wife Patsey, six children, five Black slaves, and a few friends—into two cabins that he built at the eastern edge of the park where Fish Creek, Lyons, and Loveland Roads converge. Estes brought his herd of cattle, that were raised in the green pastures of the park. He hunted deer and elk and sold their meat and hides in Denver. The Civil War broke out in 1861. During a trip that year to Missouri, where he was from, he freed his slaves. In 1865, Charles F. Estes, son of Milton and Mary Flemming Estes, was the first white child born in the park. The winters were too harsh for Estes and he left the area in 1866.

Griff Evans moved into the area and lived in the Estes cabin. Between 1868 and 1873, he added a gable and made improvements to the cabin. In 1926, the town of Estes Park erected a plaque in remembrance of the Estes family at the site of their cabin.

=== William Byers ===
William Byers, editor of the Rocky Mountain News, visited Estes in 1864 and climbed Mount Meeker when he was unable to find a route to the summit of Longs Peak. His newspaper articles about his visit led to the naming of Estes Valley. Byers, John Wesley Powell, and five other men made the first recorded ascent up Longs Peak in 1868. (Note: J.W. Goss, a St. Vrain Valley settler, and Robert J. Woodward, a Boulder rancher, said that they climbed Longs Peak on June 16, 1865, but there was no evidence or reporting of their climb at the time.)

=== Joseph Wescott ===
Joseph Wescott moved to Grand Lake in the late 1860s after visiting Hot Sulphur Springs in Middle Park in the hopes of curing his crippling rheumatism. He built a cabin and hunted and fished for food. In the winter of 1867, though, the deep snows made it difficult for him to get the food he needed. He boiled the leather from a chair and supposedly from a pair of shoes for sustenance. He was saved by a hunting party. Westcott was the first permanent resident of the area.

Prior to Wescott, Philip Crenshaw built a cabin in 1858 and trapped animals for fur. In 1868, tourists began arriving at Grand Lake.

=== Growth ===
Estes Park became a tourist town beginning in the 1870s. Byers and other adventurous writers came to the area and their published accounts of the area encouraged others to visit for its hunting, fishing, and scenery. Frederick H. Chapin explored the area and published the book, Mountaineering in Colorado: The Peaks about Estes Park in 1889. A peak in the Mummy Range is named for Chapin and his wife named Ypsilon Mountain.

People who moved to the area engaged in mining, ranching, and lodging. Some were also involved in the lumber industry. The Griffith Sawmill that operated near Bierstadt Lake and a sawmill was established near Hidden Valley.

=== Mining rush ===
Lulu City, Dutchtown, and Gaskill in the Never Summer Mountains were established in the 1870s when prospectors came to the area in search of gold and silver. Joe Shipler staked two silver claims on Shipler mountain in 1879 and built two cabins along the Colorado River and the Lulu City trail. The town of Lulu at one point had 40 houses and a hotel, but the low-yield ore was unprofitable. The boom had ended by December 1883 when miners deserted their claims. Dutchtown was abandoned by 1884.

=== Lord Dunraven ===
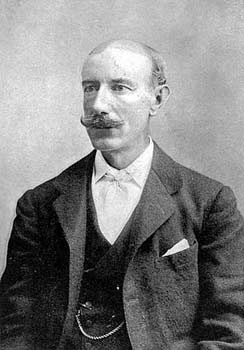
Lord Dunraven (1841–1926)

Windham Wyndham-Quin, 4th Earl of Dunraven and Mount-Earl, a famous sportsman, visited the area for the first time in 1872 (Note: A book by the National Park Service in 1919 states that Dunraven first came to the park in 1869, but the current article about him on the National Park Service website states that he came to the United States in 1869 for his honeymoon, but visited cities on the eastern seaboard, New York and Richmond.) to hunt elk. Two years later, he decided to purchase 8,000 acres along streams, which gave him access to a total of 15,000 acres, for a private game reserve or cattle ranch. He implemented a fraudulent scheme in which drifters made claims for 160 acres each under the Homestead Acts and acquired additional land through pre-emption rights. Dunraven then purchased the property from them for a nominal amount of money.

Dunraven's land grab outraged locals. Realizing that the private game reserve in Estes Park was not going to be a viable effort, Dunraven established a game park and hunting lodge in what is now Dunraven Glade, north of Estes Park. He established a cattle ranch in Estes Park called the "English Dairy", which had Swiss cattle that he brought into the area. In July 1877, Dunraven opened the Estes Park Hotel, with a good view of the mountains. Dunraven visited the area for the last time in the mid-1880s and abandoned much of his vast Estes Park claims. In 1885, he was made Undersecretary for the Colonies, which created increasing responsibilities to Queen Victoria. He also may have lost interest in Estes Park for a number of personal reasons. Dunraven sold most of his lands and interests in the area in 1908 to F.O. Stanley and B.D. Sanborn.

=== Albert Bierstadt ===
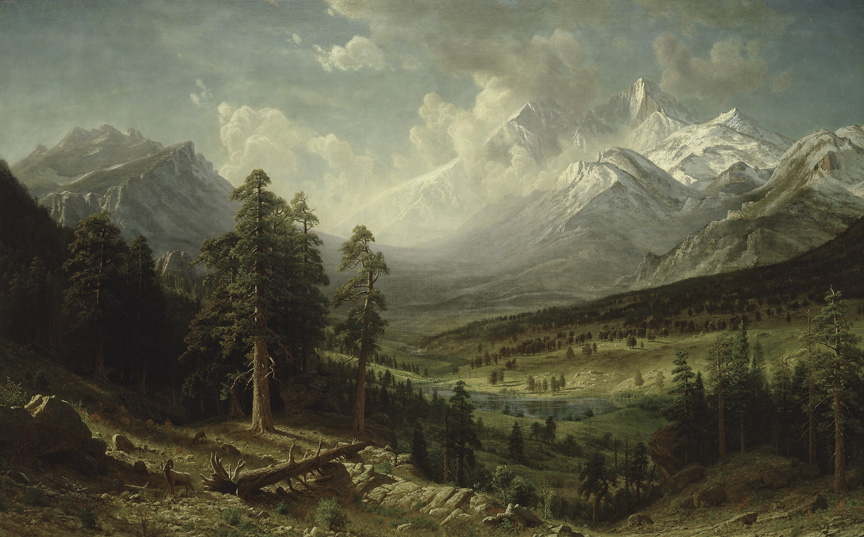
Albert Bierstadt, Estes Park and Longs Peak, 1876, Denver Art Museum was commissioned by the Earl of Dunraven

Albert Bierstadt, who may have been the first European to visit the summit of Mount Blue Sky, Bierstadt was commissioned in 1876 by the Earl of Dunraven to make an exceptionally large canvas painting of Longs Peak and Estes Park for $15,000, equivalent to $442,922 in 2024. He traveled throughout the area with Theodore Whyte, the earl's associate, and created sketches and paintings. The two men also looked for a suitable site, with a great view of Longs Peak, to construct an English hotel for the earl. Bierstadt took a particular interest in a lake, now called Bierstadt Lake. Harold Marion Dunning, an early historian, said "that Bierstadt's favorite place for mountain sketches and material for some of his famous paintings was on the shore of the lake that now bears his name". Bierstadt's painting of the lake is now in the Denver Art Museum's collection.

== Founding a national park ==
The Denver, Utah and Pacific Railroad reached Lyons, Colorado in 1881; and the Big Thompson Canyon Road was completed in 1904. Automobile stage lines offered transportation to Estes Park from Loveland in 1907 and from Lyons in 1909.

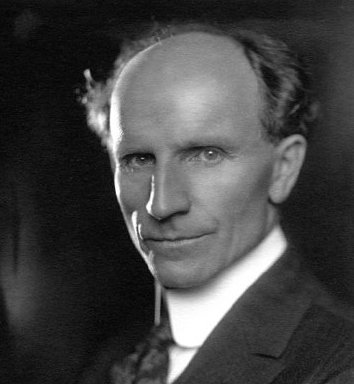
Enos A. Mills, circa 1915

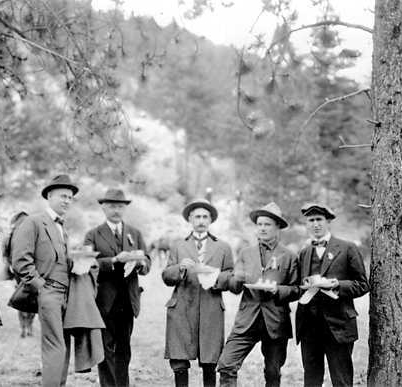
Dedication of Rocky Mountain National Park in 1916. (l to r): Stephen T. Mather, Robert Sterling Yard, Acting Superintendent Trowbridge, First Park Service Photographer Herford T. Cowling, and Horace M. Albright.

The movement to establish a national park in the Rocky Mountains in Colorado succeeded in 1915 because of the combined efforts of multiple groups of people over many years. Prominent individuals in the effort included Enos Mills from the Estes Park area, James Grafton Rogers from Denver, and J. Horace McFarland of Pennsylvania. Each of these men performed essential work for the cause.

=== Enos Mills ===
Enos Mills, then a 14-year-old boy, moved to Estes Park in 1884. He explored the mountains of the area and wrote many books and articles describing the region. A resort owner, naturalist, and promoter of the conservation of nature, Mills pitched the idea of an "Estes National Park" in 1909, quickly earning the support of his fellow local businessmen in the form of the Estes Park Protective and Improvement Association. He wrote essays predominantly for popular national magazines like The Saturday Evening Post, and these were published in book form during the more than five-year park campaign, promoting Colorado's Rocky Mountain region to the reading public: Wild Life on the Rockies (1909); The Spell of the Rockies (1911); In Beaver World (1913); and Rocky Mountain Wonderland (1915). Mills also toured the country speaking to audiences of the wonder and beauty of the Estes Park area, and gathered the support of influential friends as he went.

=== Arapaho place names ===
The Colorado Geographical Society (Note: The Colorado Mountain Club was believed to have arranged for the Arapaho elders to visit the park, per Kenneth Jessen in Arapaho Indians shared knowledge of Rocky Mountain National Park, while Perry said it was the Colorado Mountain Club) arranged for two Arapaho elders to return to the park in 1914 and share their names of places before the U.S. Geological Society printed maps of the park. Some of the places in the park that bear Native American names are Nokhu Crags ("rocks where the eagles nest"), Kawuneechee ("coyote") Valley, and Mount Neota ("mountain sheep's heart").

=== Bill signed ===
The bill passed Congress and was signed by President Woodrow Wilson on January 26, 1915. A formal dedication ceremony was held on September 4, 1915 in Horseshoe Park. The park has expanded over the years, with the largest parcel — the Never Summer Range — added in 1929.

== Developing a national park ==
The 1920s saw a boom in building lodges and roads in the park, culminating with the construction of Trail Ridge Road to Fall River Pass between 1929 and 1932, then to Grand Lake by 1938. The Civilian Conservation Corps handled several building projects during the Great Depression and remnants of their camps can be found in the park today.

Rocky Mountain National Park was a place for downhill skiing. Hidden Valley (Ski Estes Park) operated between 1955 and 1991 along U.S. 34, five miles (8.0 km) west of Estes Park. The area had been skied by locals long before it opened as a ski area.

== Agnes Vaille ==
Not all leave Longs Peak alive and safe. There is a stone gazebo at the Keyhole formation with a plaque memorializing Agnes Vaille, a well-known climber in the 1920s. In January 1925, Vaille fell 100 ft (30 m) while descending the North Face. Vaille survived the fall with minor injuries, but was unable to walk. Her climbing partner, professional mountaineering guide Walter Kiener, went for help; but when rescuers arrived, Vaille had died of fatigue and hypothermia. One of the rescuers, Herbert Sortland, froze to death after breaking his hip while trying to rescue her.

== 21st-century environmental events ==
On June 24, 2010, a wildfire burned over 1,500 acres (6.1 km^{2}) of the park in Larimer County near Estes Park. Estes Park Fire Department believed that lightning may have started the fire.

In September 2013, both the park and the town of Estes Park were heavily damaged by a significant 500-year rain event. The park was closed to visitors September 12–19, 2013, and all roads leading to the park entrance from the east were closed for several days to several weeks. At one point, the only way to leave the town of Estes Park was via Trail Ridge Road, the park's scenic byway leading to the town of Grand Lake on the western side of the Continental Divide. The most lasting impacts inside the park were in the Alluvial Fan area, where flood waters, rocks, and debris washed away parking areas, and much of Fall River Road. After repairs, the road reopened on July 2, 2015.
