= Braided river =

Network of river channels

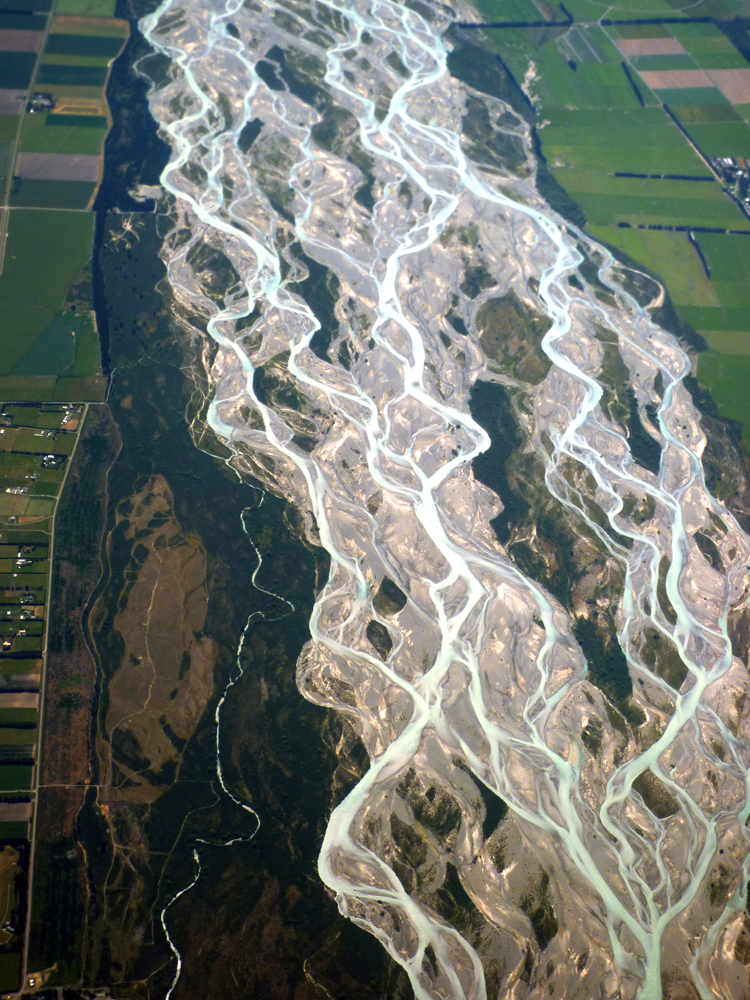
The Rakaia River in the South Island of New Zealand is braided over most of its course

A braided river (also called braided channel or braided stream) consists of a network of river channels separated by small, often temporary, islands called braid bars or, in British English usage, aits or eyots.

Braided streams tend to occur in rivers with high sediment loads or coarse grain sizes, and in rivers with steeper slopes than typical rivers with straight or meandering channel patterns. They are also associated with rivers with rapid and frequent variation in the amount of water they carry, i.e., with "flashy" rivers, and with rivers with weak banks.

Braided channels are found in a variety of environments all over the world, including gravelly mountain streams, sand bed rivers, on alluvial fans, on river deltas, and across depositional plains.

== Description ==
A braided river consists of a network of multiple shallow channels that diverge and rejoin around ephemeral braid bars. This gives the river a fancied resemblance to the interwoven strands of a braid. The braid bars, also known as channel bars, branch islands, or accreting islands, are usually unstable and may be completely covered at times of high water. The channels and braid bars are usually highly mobile, with the river layout often changing significantly during flood events. When the islets separating channels are stabilized by vegetation, so that they are more permanent features, they are sometimes called aits or eyots.

A braided river differs from a meandering river, which has a single sinuous channel. It is also distinct from an anastomosing river, which consist of multiple interweaving semi-permanent channels which are separated by floodplain rather than channel bars; these channels may themselves be braided.

== Formation ==
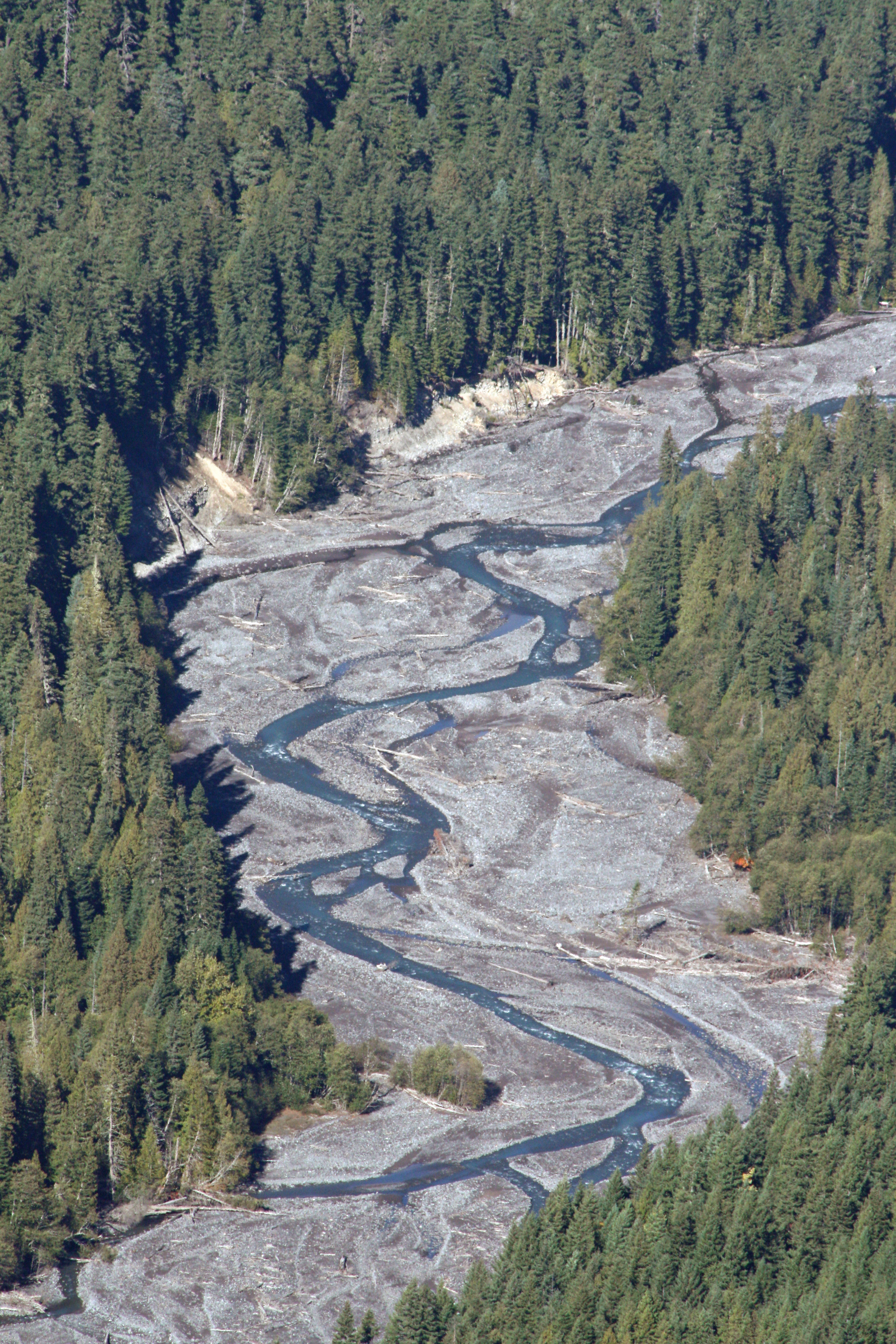
The White River in the U.S. state of Washington transports a large sediment load from the Emmons Glacier of Mount Rainier, a young, rapidly eroding volcano.

The physical processes that determine whether a river will be braided or meandering are not fully understood. However, there is wide agreement that a river becomes braided when it carries an abundant supply of sediments.

Experiments with flumes suggest that a river becomes braided when a threshold level of sediment load or slope is reached. On timescales long enough for the river to evolve, a sustained increase in sediment load will increase the bed slope of the river, so that a variation of slope is equivalent to a variation in sediment load, provided the amount of water carried by the river is unchanged. A threshold slope was experimentally determined to be 0.016 (ft/ft) for a 0.15 cu ft/s (0.0042 m^{3}/s) stream with poorly sorted coarse sand. Any slope over this threshold created a braided stream, while any slope under the threshold created a meandering stream or – for very low slopes – a straight channel. Also important to channel development is the proportion of suspended load sediment to bed load. An increase in suspended sediment allowed for the deposition of fine erosion-resistant material on the inside of a curve, which accentuated the curve and in some instances, caused a river to shift from a braided to a meandering profile.

These experimental results were expressed in formulas relating the critical slope for braiding to the discharge and grain size. The higher the discharge, the lower the critical slope, while larger grain size yields a higher critical slope. However, these give only an incomplete picture, and numerical simulations have become increasingly important for understanding braided rivers.

Aggradation (net deposition of sediments) favors braided rivers, but is not essential. For example, the Rakaia and Waitaki Rivers of New Zealand are not aggrading, due to retreating shorelines, but are nonetheless braided rivers. Variable discharge has also been identified as important in braided rivers, but this may be primarily due to the tendency for frequent floods to reduce bank vegetation and destabilize the banks, rather than because variable discharge is an essential part of braided river formation.

Numerical models suggest that bedload transport (movement of sediment particles by rolling or bouncing along the river bottom) is essential to formation of braided rivers, with net erosion of sediments at channel divergences and net deposition at convergences. Braiding is reliably reproduced in simulations whenever there is little lateral constraint on flow and there is significant bedload transport. Braiding is not observed in simulations of the extreme cases of pure scour (no deposition taking place), which produces a dendritic system, or of cohesive sediments with no bedload transport. Meanders fully develop only when the river banks are sufficiently stabilized to limit lateral flow. An increase in suspended sediment relative to bedload allows the deposition of fine erosion-resistant material on the inside of a curve, which accentuated the curve and in some instances, causes a river to shift from a braided to a meandering profile. A stream with cohesive banks that are resistant to erosion will form narrow, deep, meandering channels, whereas a stream with highly erodible banks will form wide, shallow channels, preventing the helical flow of the water necessary for meandering and resulting in the formation of braided channels.

== Occurrences ==
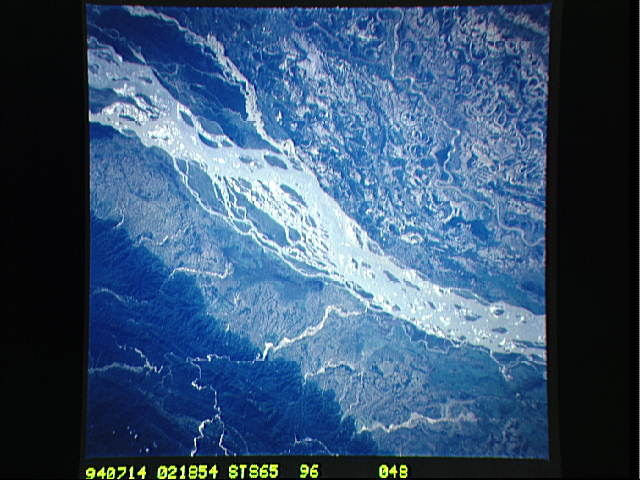
Brahmaputra River seen from the Space Shuttle

Braided rivers occur in many environments, but are most common in wide valleys associated with mountainous regions or their piedmonts or in areas of coarse-grained sediments and limited growth of vegetation near the river banks. They are also found on fluvial (stream-dominated) alluvial fans. Extensive braided river systems are found in Alaska, Canada, New Zealand's South Island, and the Himalayas, which all contain young, rapidly eroding mountains.

- The enormous Brahmaputra river in Northeastern India is a classic example of a braided river.
- A notable example of a large braided stream in the contiguous United States is the Platte River in central and western Nebraska. Platte-type braided rivers are characterized by abundant linguoid (tonguelike) bar and dune deposits.
- The Scott River of southern Alaska is the type for braided glacial outwash rivers characterized by longitudinal gravel bars and by sand lenses deposited in scours from times of high water.
- The Donjek River of the Yukon Basin is the type for braided rivers showing repeated cycles of deposition, with finer sediments towards the top of each cycle.
- The Bijou Creek of Colorado is the type for braided rivers characterized by laminated sand deposits emplaced during floods.
- A portion of the lower Yellow River takes a braided form.
- The Sewanee Conglomerate, a Pennsylvanian coarse sandstone and conglomerate unit present on the Cumberland Plateau near the University of the South, may have been deposited by an ancient braided and meandering river that once existed in the eastern United States. Others have interpreted the depositional environment for this unit as a tidal delta.

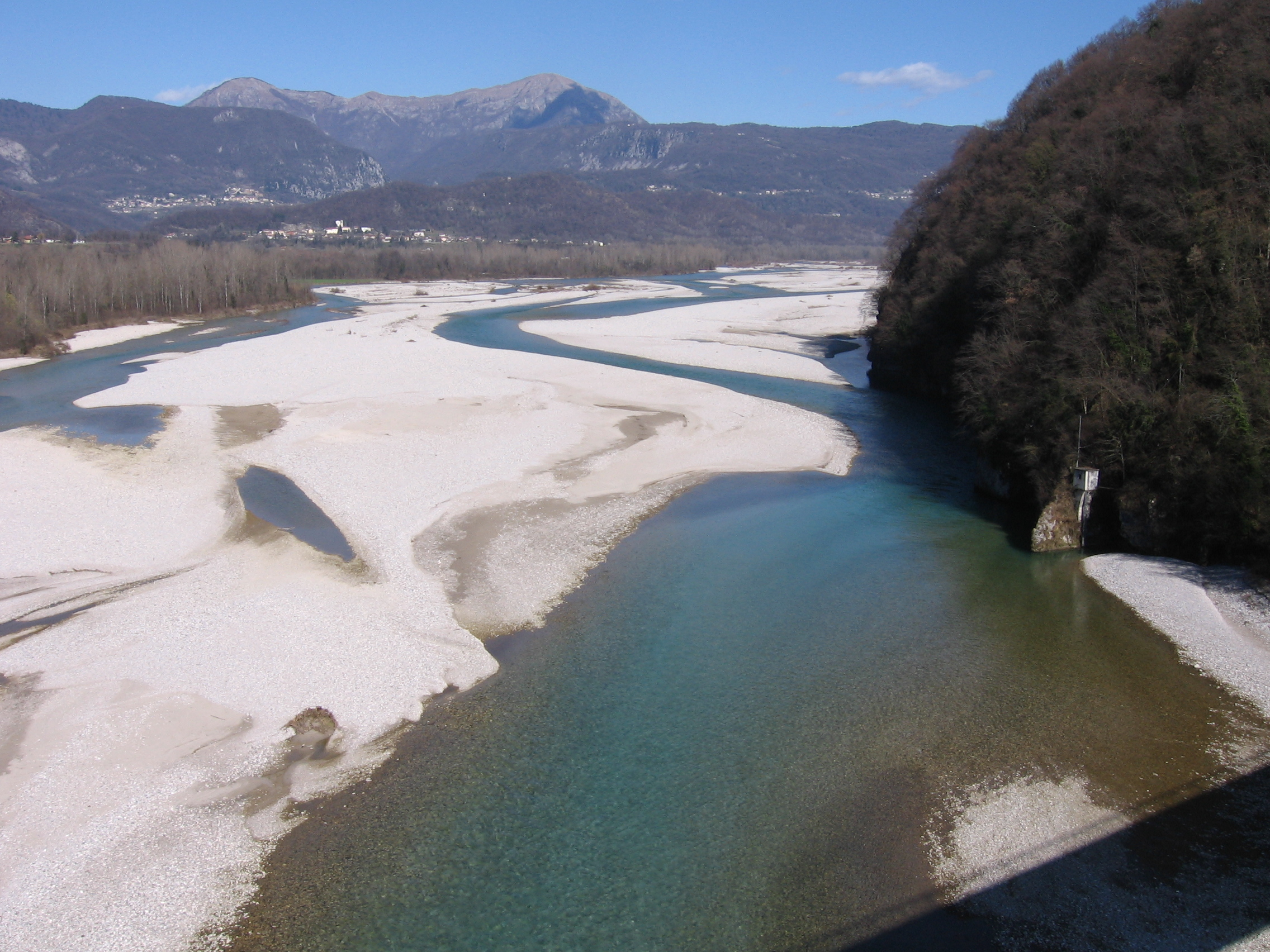
Tagliamento River seen from the Pinzano bridge

- The Tagliamento of Italy is an example of a gravel bed braided river.
- The Piave, also in Italy, is an example of a river that is transitioning from braided to meandering due to human interventions.
- The Waimakariri River of New Zealand is an example of a braided river with an extensive floodplain.
- The Hawkesbury Sandstone of Sydney is commonly interpreted as having been deposited by a large braided river system that existed during the Triassic period in Australia.
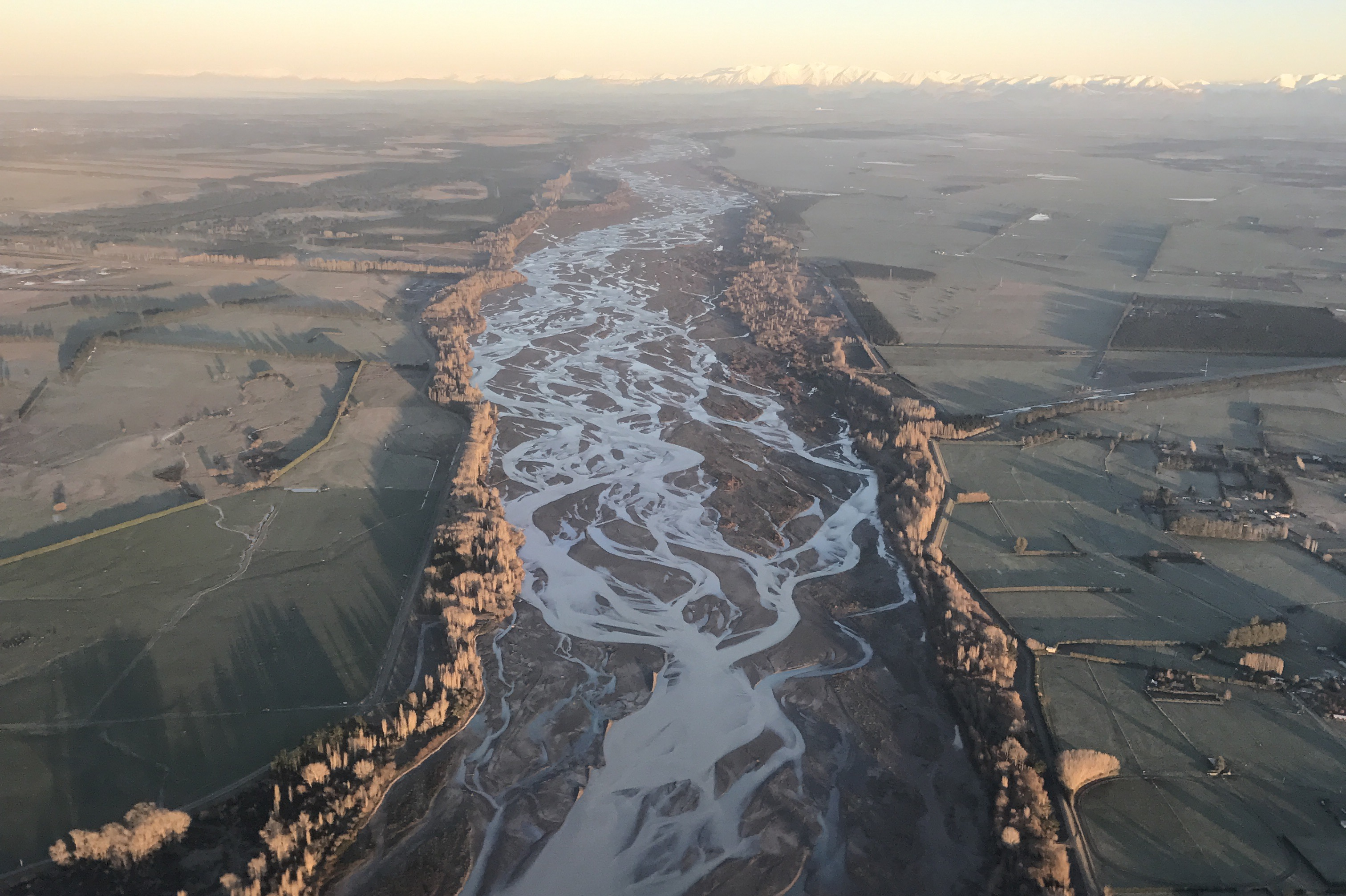
Waimakariri River with the Southern Alps in the background, Canterbury, New Zealand

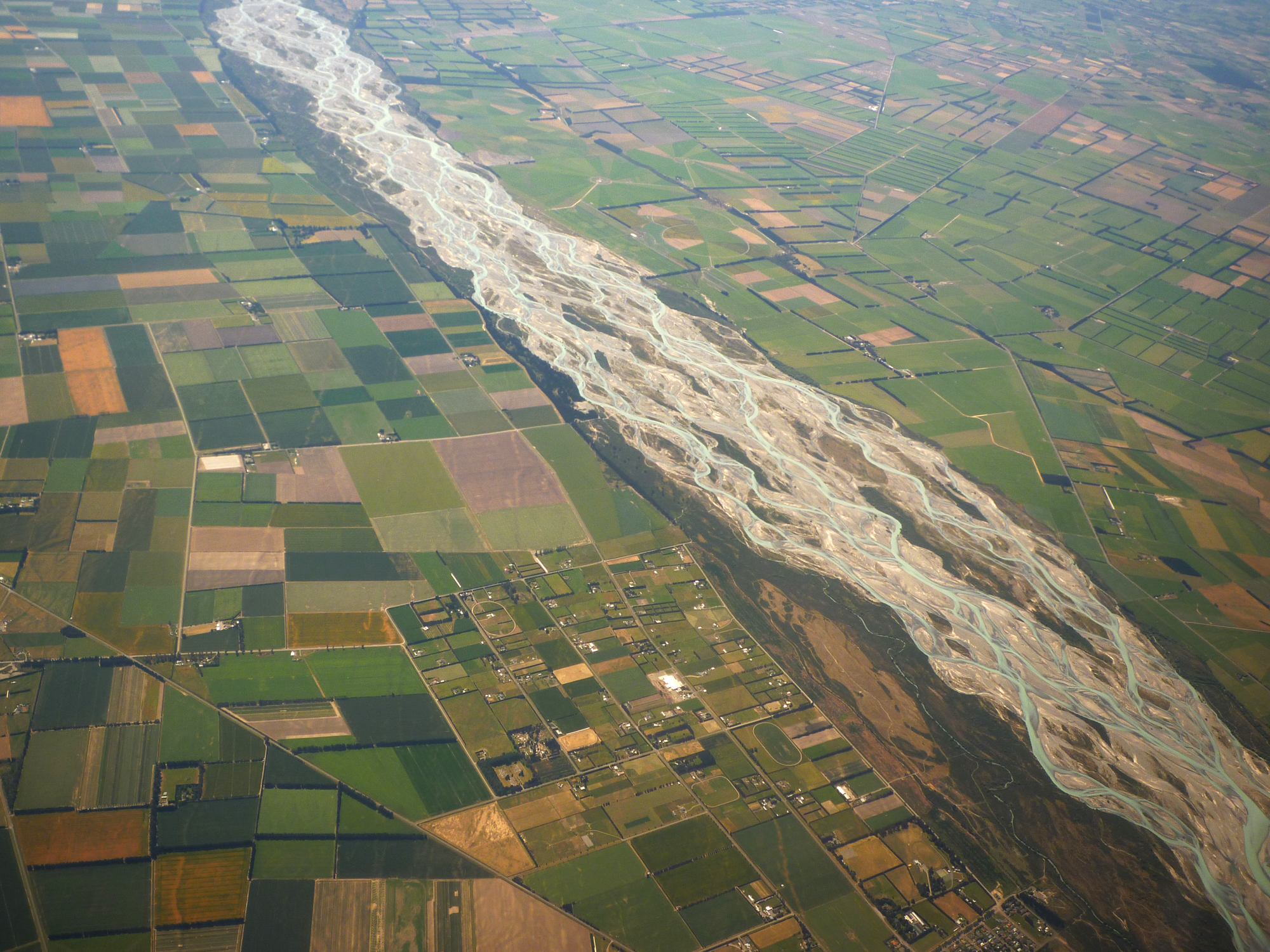
Rakaia River, South Island, New Zealand

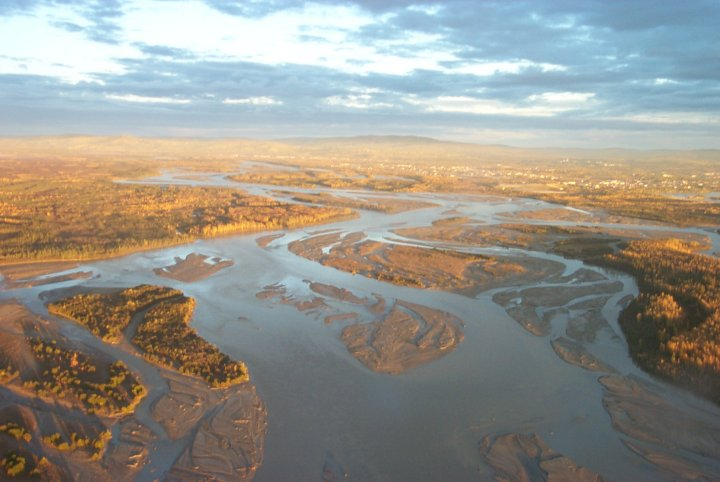
Tanana River, Fairbanks, Alaska, United States

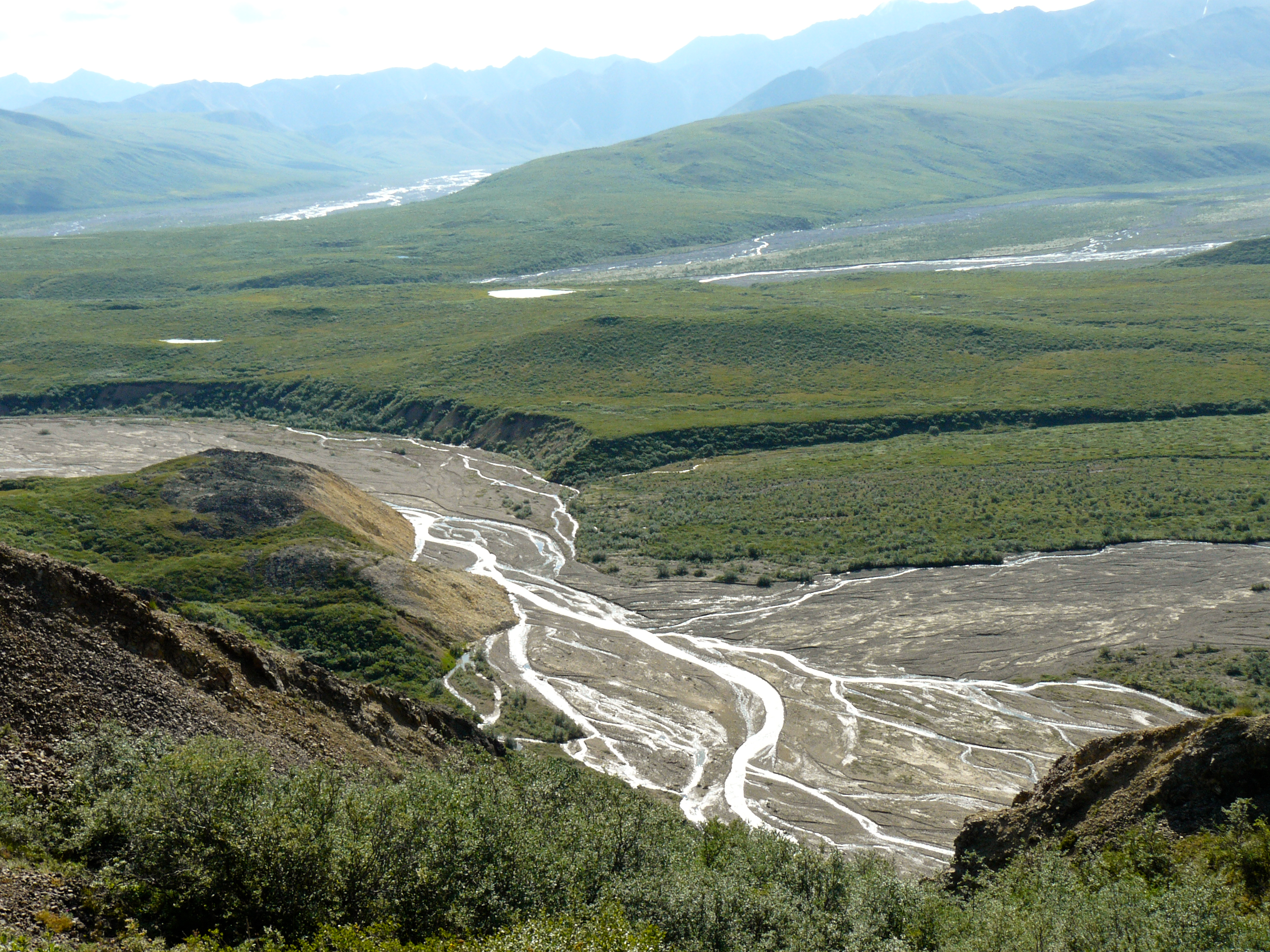
Toklat River, Denali National Park and Preserve, Alaska, United States

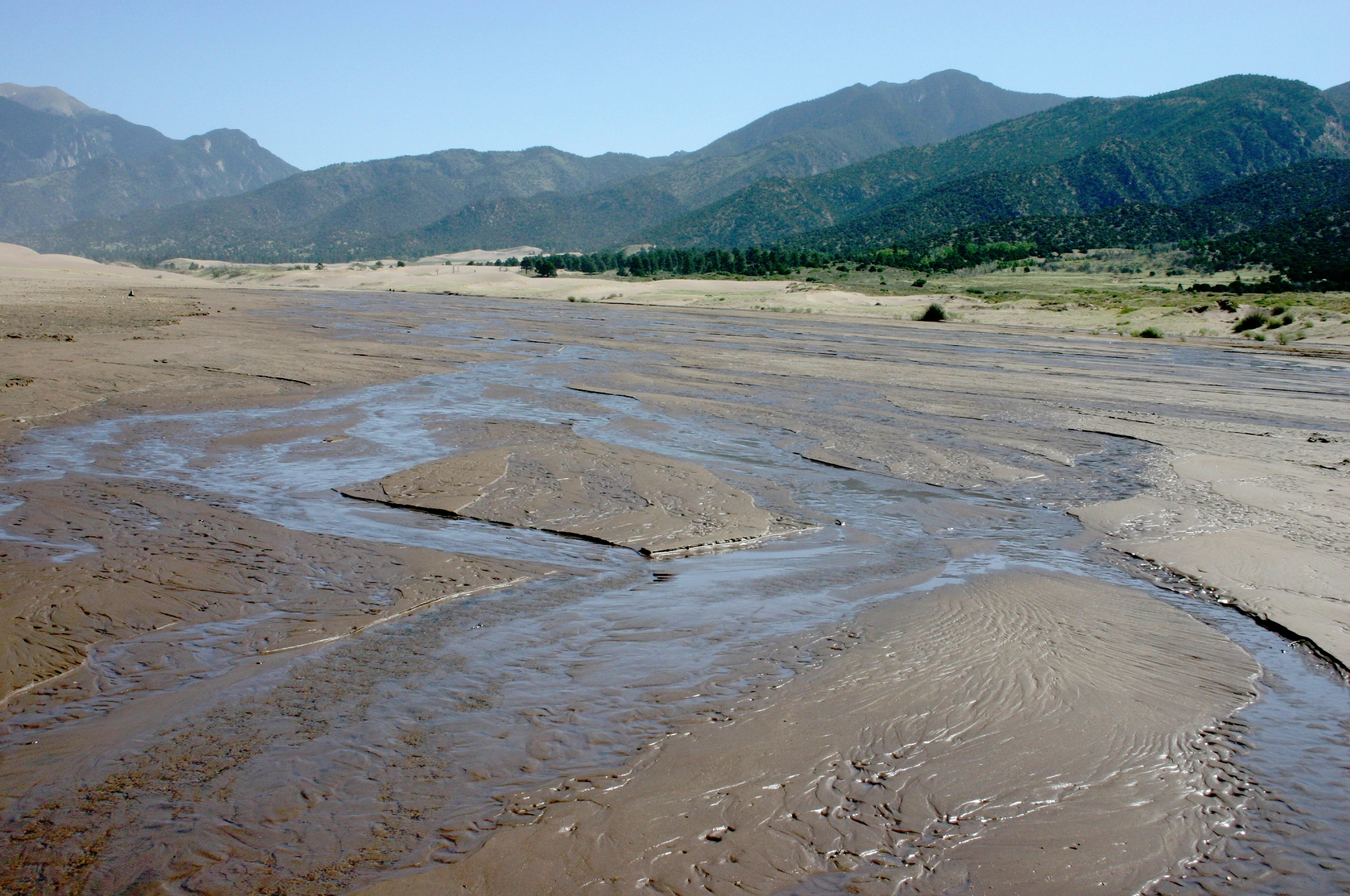
Medano Creek, Great Sand Dunes National Park and Preserve, Colorado, United States

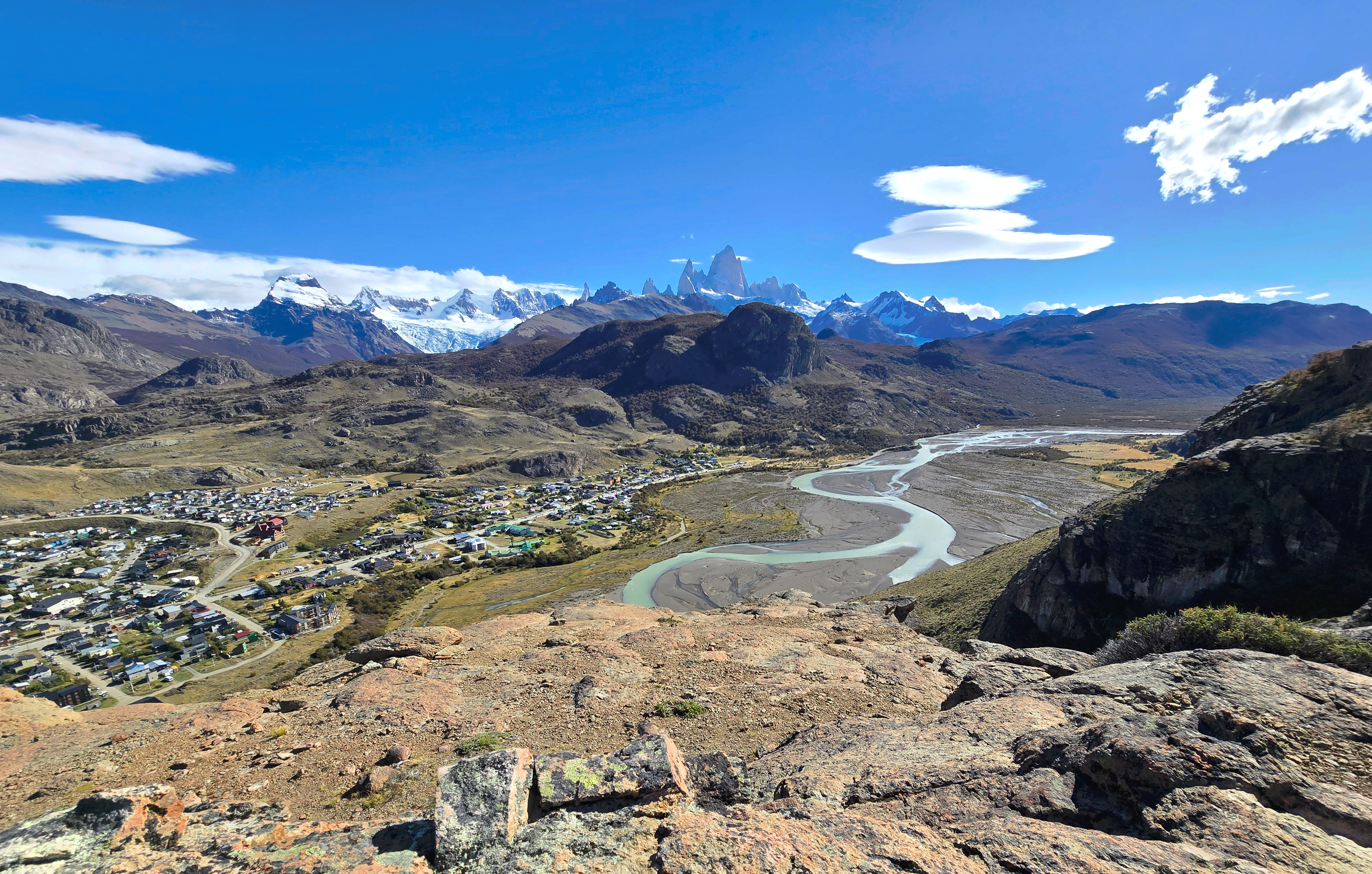
Las Vueltas River, El Chalten, Argentina

== See also ==
- Anabranch – Part of a river or stream that diverts from and rejoins the main channel
- Lagoon – Shallow body of water separated from a larger one by a narrow landform
- Shoal – Natural submerged sandbank that rises from a body of water to near the surface
