= Moccasin Bill Perkins =

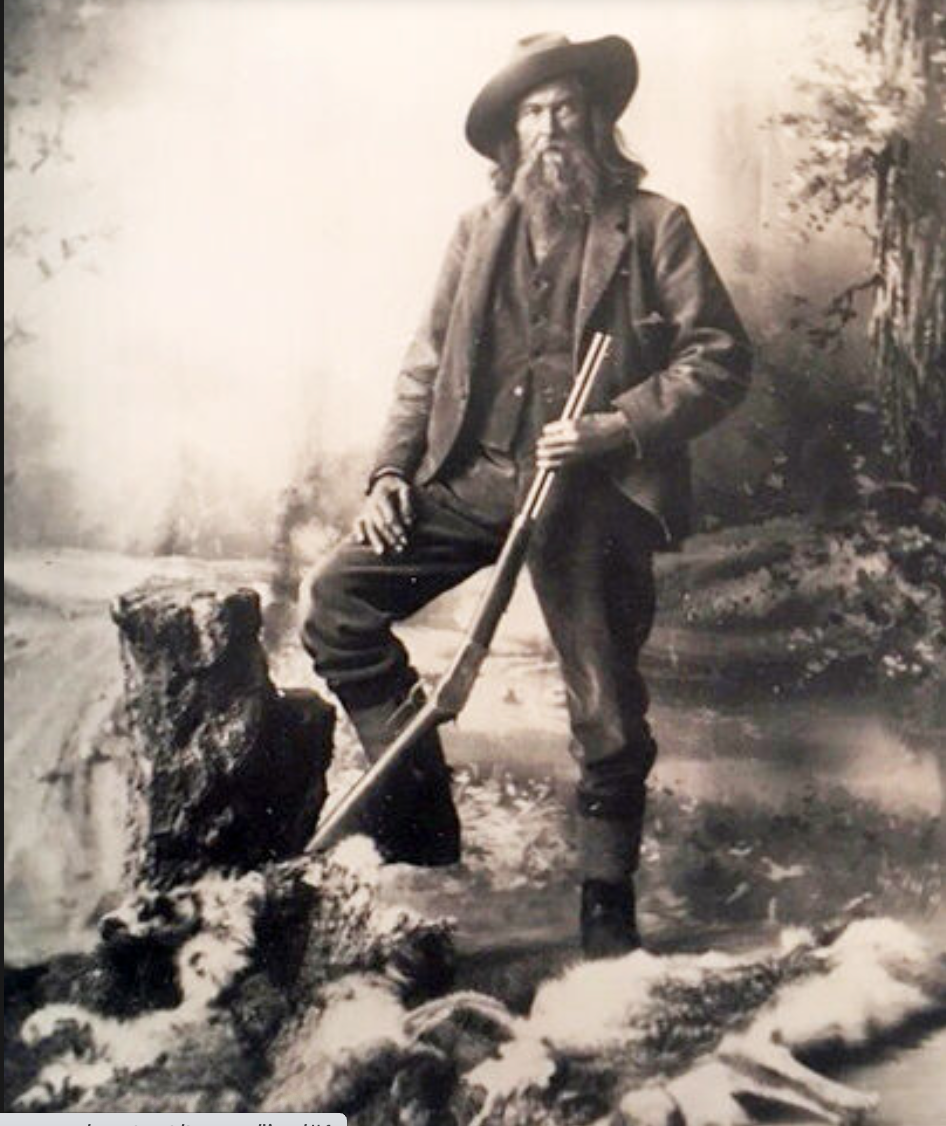
- Born: December 24, 1825 near Princeton in Gibson County, Indiana
- Died: November 13, 1904 (aged 78) near Crawford, Colorado
- Occupation(s): frontiersman, hunter, miner, farmer
- Spouse: Mary Ann Hart

William Henry Perkins, better known as "Moccasin Bill" Perkins (December 24, 1825 – November 13, 1904), was a frontiersman, scout, and hunter. Born in Indiana, he learned to trap and hunt as a child when the area was a wilderness. He continually moved west to Missouri, Kansas, central Colorado, and ultimately the Western Slope of Colorado. During the American Civil War, he was a government scout out of Fort Scott and was injured by Native American arrows. He tried his hand at farming in Kansas, but yearned for the frontier where he was a hunter, trapper, and miner. He was particularly known for his skill as a bear hunter. He was a friend of Buffalo Bill (William Frederick Cody).

== Early life ==
William Henry Perkins was born December 24, 1825 (Note: He died November 13, 1904, when he was 78 years, 10 months, and 20 days of age, which means he was born December 24, 1825.) (Note: According to census records, he was born about 1829.) near Princeton in Gibson County, Indiana. He began trapping animals in the forests around his house as a child. He developed his own traps and became known as the boy trapper in southwestern Indiana. When he was seven, he was allowed to carry a gun to protect himself against wild animals in the forests. One day he had captured a turkey and was walking through the forests at the confluence of the Wabash and White River when he found that he was followed by a large panther. He threw the turkey on the ground, which was quickly devoured by the cat, and Perkins quickly got into his boat and rowed across the water. The panther swam after him. He completed his 10 miles (16 km) trek back home during which the panther gave up chasing him. In the morning, he and a trapper set out with the trapper's dogs to find the panther. After catching sight of him, Perkins killed the panther, known as the "Terror of the Wabash", with one shot to the heart.

Throughout his childhood, the forests were thinned by settlers who built houses and established themselves on the land. At the age of nineteen, he left Indiana for western Missouri, which was wilderness at the time.

== Marriage and family ==
Perkins married Mary Ann Hart in Missouri about 1858. His wife, born about 1839 in Pennsylvania, was 19 at the time of their marriage. They lived with their first four daughters in Bourbon County, Kansas, in 1875. Perkins was a widower and a rancher in 1880, living in Texas Creek and Ula, Colorado. In 1885, he was living in Costilla, Colorado.

Their children were: Elenora (born about 1860), Rosa (born about 1864), Mary (born about 1866), Martha (born about 1873), Maggie (born about 1873), Willie (born about 1880) and Almeda (born about 1880). Willie and Almeda were twins. Mary and his daughter Martha were not on the 1880 census. Over the course of their marriage, they had six daughters and four sons.

He played the fiddle at local dances in Colorado.

== Frontiersman and miner ==
Perkins, a 200 pounds (91 kg) man who was 6 ft 7 1/4 in (201.3 cm) tall in his boots, settled in western Missouri. He built a cabin and was married. He and his wife had sons and daughters. Perkins hunted deer and trapped animals. He was also a farmer.

While living at Fort Scott in eastern Kansas, he built a house for his family and farmed. Working as a government scout, he went west into what is now Fremont County, Colorado, to watch the movements of Native Americans beginning in 1860. He was among the first Anglo-Americans to locate in the area. He was also a government scout during the American Civil War, working out of Fort Scott. During skirmishes with Plains Native Americans, Perkins sustained numerous wounds from arrows. He claimed that he was so large that he made an easy target.

In 1865, he mined at what is now Cripple Creek near Pikes Peak. He dug a lot of prospect holes there. In 1868, he went to Rosita, Colorado, where he mined and hunted. He and his companions mined above the timberline. When their provisions were low, the other men left Perkins to guard the claim and set out for supplies but did not return. After he ran out of food, Perkins set out during a bad snowstorm for the town of Rosita. He wore a pair of thin moccasins which became frozen to his feet. Unable to get the moccasins off without damaging his frost-bitten feet, he encased his feet in larger moccasins and waited until his feet healed. This is how he received the soubriquet of Moccasin Bill.

His family followed him to Rosita, and again to Leadville, Colorado. He was among the first to come to the mining camp and he built the second house in Leadville. In 1880, Perkins was living on his ranch 12 miles (19 km) northwest of Silver Cliff in the foothills of the Sangre de Cristo Mountains. He was said to have lived in the Hardscrabble area. His daughter Eleanor married John "Jack" Mullins on August 23, 1880. A few days after the marriage, Mullins was killed. There are two theories. One was that Billy Toil, who had earlier courted Eleanor, killed Mullins out of jealousy. Another was that there was a conspiracy involving Eleanor, her father, and others to get access to bullion that Mullins had saved.

He lived on the western slope of Colorado where he hunted big game. He often went on hunting trips by himself, sometimes with his daughter Ella, and his burro. He killed 149 or more bears (Note: In his obituary published by the Los Angeles Times, it stated that he killed 350 bears. The Canon City Recorder stated that he killed more than 300 bears. From a newspaper article in 1890, he killed 96 bears by that time.) and was hired by Big Muddy Cattle Company to kill bears and mountain lions that threatened the livelihood of its stock. He killed 40 bears over his five-year period of employment for the company. In 1902, he killed a bear that weighed more than 1,100 pounds (500 kg) near Montrose. The hide was exhibited in St. Louis as part of the Colorado collection at the time of his death in 1904.

He was known for his marksmanship on the western slope, as he proved at contests at the Delta, Mesa, and Montrose County Fairs. During his life, he hunted, fished, and trapped with Buffalo Bill.

== Later years and death ==
Perkins lived in later years near Crawford, Colorado, and he died November 13, 1904, at his ranch. (Note: He is also said to have died on November 20, 1904, in Paonia, Colorado (near Crawford).) His funeral was held at Fort Crawford, after which he was interred at the Garden of Memories Cemetery in Crawford.
