= Joseph Bijeau =

American fur trapper

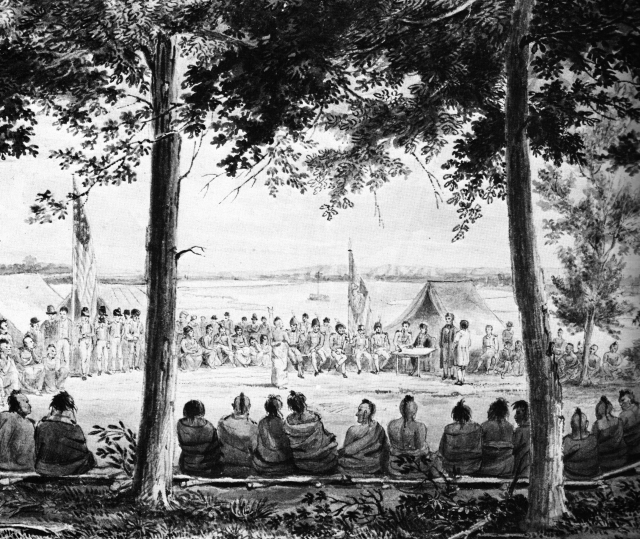
Pawnees in a parley with Major Stephen Long's expedition at Council Bluffs, Iowa, in 1819. From an original painting (watercolor) by Samuel Seymour (1775 – 1823).

Joseph Bijeau (1778–after 1837), also known as Joseph Bijeau dit Bissonet and Joseph Bissonet, (Note: Bijeau is also spelled Bijou. Bissonet is also spelled Bissonette, Bissonnet, or Bissonnette.) was among the earliest fur trappers of the Rocky Mountains. He was a guide for Stephen Harriman Long's expedition of the Great Plains in 1820. A fur trapper and hunter, he lived among the Pawnee people. He was able to communicate to a number of Native American tribes through his use of sign language as well as the Crow language, which was used among a number of western tribes. After Spain lost the Mexican territory (present-day New Mexico), trappers like Bijeau moved to Taos where they could trap, trade, and travel east without the hostilities that they experienced in the western United States.

== Early years ==
Joseph Bissonet was born on June 15, 1778, at St. Louis, New Spain. His parents were Louis Bissonette and Genevieve, the daughter of Charles Routier who immigrated from Fort de Chartres to St. Louis in 1765. Bissonette was in St. Louis by 1765. His father, an Illinois Creole, traded with the Little Osage people, and died in 1786. His father's surname was also spelled Bizouet and Visonet in St. Louis records. (Note: Louis Bissonet, born in 1774, was the son of Louis Bissonette and Genevieve Routier. Louis was Joseph's brother, both of whom worked with Manuel Lisa.) His mother married twice and he attained the surname of his stepfather, becoming Joseph Bijeau. He was of French Canadian heritage.

St. Louis, with an advantageous location at the confluence of the Missouri and Mississippi Rivers, was established as a fur trading post in 1764. The land had been the ancestral territory of a group of 12 to 13 Native American tribes, known as the Illini Confederacy.

A Joseph Bissonette could have had land in St. Louis, but he never claimed it, as was true for a couple of other men. His brother Louis Bissonet (1774–ca. 1836) was a trader along the upper Missouri River in the early 1800s, working for Auguste Chouteau. His brother also took the Bijeau / Bijou surname at times. The Bijou Hills of South Dakota are named for Louis, who in 1812 established a trading post in the area. His nephew, Joseph Bissonet (1818–1894), was a trader at Fort Laramie, Wyoming.

== Trapper and hunter ==
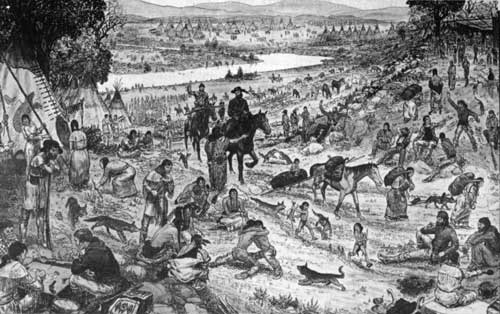
Rocky Mountain Rendezvous for fur trappers and hunters

He worked as a fur trapper beginning in 1806. By 1812, Bijeau worked in the fur trade with Manuel Lisa. (Note: In 1813, his brother Louis ran a trading post for Lisa. Located below Grand Detour, it served the Sioux.) He worked as a fur trapper for a fur trapping company based in St. Louis, Missouri beginning around 1814. The owners of the firm were Auguste Chouteau, Manuel Lisa, and Jules de Mun. He was a member of the Chouteau-de Mun expedition of fur traders into the southwest in 1815. He went into the wilderness of present-day Colorado to trap beaver and hunt buffalo. The fur pelts were traded in posts along the Front Range and then sent east.

He traveled into the interior of the Rocky Mountains, where the beaver were abundant. He was very knowledgeable about the trails into the Rocky Mountains, and as far north as Yellowstone and south to Santa Fe. His fellow frontiersmen included Jacques La Ramee (Laramie), Kit Carson, Alexander Sinclair, and Andrew Sublette.

Spanish troops arrested 21 trappers for encroaching on Spanish lands between 1815 and 1817. They were taken to Santa Fe, where he was imprisoned for 48 days. He returned then to St. Louis.

He knew the Crow and sign language, and was understood by a number of Native American tribes. Sign language was used among Native Americans due to the diversity of languages, thereby allowing a universal means of communication. The Crow language was known amongst many of the western tribes. He lived with the Pawnee in 1820.

== Stephen H. Long Expedition ==
Major Stephen Harriman Long's expedition was a federal government military and scientific reconnaissance of the Great Plains. It went along the Missouri River in Nebraska up to the Front Range of Colorado and east across Indian Territory (now Oklahoma). The expedition was split into two parties. Bijeau was a guide and interpreter for the group that was led by Captain John R. Bell down the Arkansas River and to the Rocky Mountains. The other party followed the Red River.

The group consisted of Captain Bell, Lieutenant Swift, Samuel Seymore, and five soldiers, as well as the guides—Bijeau, Deloux and Julien—with Bijeau considered the most valuable because he had been a hunter and resident in the region for a number of years. Initially, Deloux and Bijeau were reluctant to leave their families. They accepted the positions after Long threatened Bijeau and Deloux that Indian agents would be told of their reluctance to act as guides and that he would ask that Canadian fur trappers forbidden from trading with the Pawnee in the future.

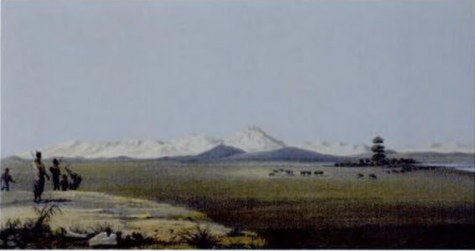
Samuel Seymour, Distant view of the Rocky Mountains, Long Expedition, 1820

Bijeau hunted, butchered, and cooked food for the expedition. He also provided other services for the care and safety of the men and animals, including veterinarian services. He was described as "faithful, active, industrious, and communicative". He shared stories of his adventures in the Rocky Mountain region. Due to the experience and prowess of their guides and Bell's diplomacy, the expedition did not have any negative experiences with the Native Americans that they met. Bijeau conveyed his knowledge of the Rocky Mountains: that some of the peaks were inaccessible and covered in snow year-round, that rivers and streams ran through the valleys, and that the valleys could be up to thirty miles in width.

They saw their first view of the Rocky Mountains on June 30, 1820, near what is now Bijou Creek of Fort Morgan. Long named the creek Bijeaus Creek for his guide.

We discovered a blue strip, close in with the horizon to the west —which was by some pronounced to be no more than a cloud — by others, to be the Rocky Mountains."

— Captain John Bell, journalist of the Long Expedition

They traveled south along the Front Range, along the South Platte River and up Pikes Peak, the Manitou Mineral Springs, then east again along the Arkansas River. Bijeau and Ledoux traveled with them part of the way east, and then returned to their home with the Pawnee on the Loup River in present-day Nebraska.

== Taos trapper ==
Spain lost control of present-day New Mexico in 1821. The area was attractive to trappers because they could easily and safely travel the Santa Fe Trail back east to the United States and there were no hostile Native Americans in the area. Now, the Spanish empire was no longer involved or concerned about frontiersmen trapping for fur. In the 1820s, Bijeau and other trappers moved to Taos of the First Mexican Empire. Bijeau moved there in 1824 and requested naturalization papers in 1830, as did Abraham Ledoux. Bijeau trapped with Ceran St. Vrain and Bernard Pratte in the winter of 1827–1828. He lived in Taos in 1836 and 1837, around the time his brother Louis died.

== See also ==
- List of mountain men

== Sources ==
- Benson, Maxine (1988). From Pittsburgh to the Rocky Mountains : Major Stephen Long's expedition, 1819-1820. Golden, Colorado: Fulcrum. ISBN 978-1-55591-022-8.
- Buchholtz, C. W. (1983). Rocky Mountain National Park : a history. Boulder, Colorado: Colorado Associated University Press. ISBN 978-0-87081-146-3.
- Evans, Howard Ensign (1997). The natural history of the Long Expedition to the Rocky Mountains (1819-1820). New York: Oxford University Press. ISBN 978-0-19-511185-9.
- Houck, Louis (1908). A history of Missouri from the earliest explorations and settlements until the admission of the state into the union. Chicago, R. R. Donnelley & sons company.
- Mayhall, Mildred P. (1971). The Kiowas. Norman, Oklahoma: University of Oklahoma Press.
- Weber, David J. (1971). The Taos trappers; the fur trade in the Far Southwest, 1540-1846. Norman, Oklahoma: University of Oklahoma Press. ISBN 978-0-8061-0944-2.
