= Bierstadt Lake =

Lake in Colorado, United States

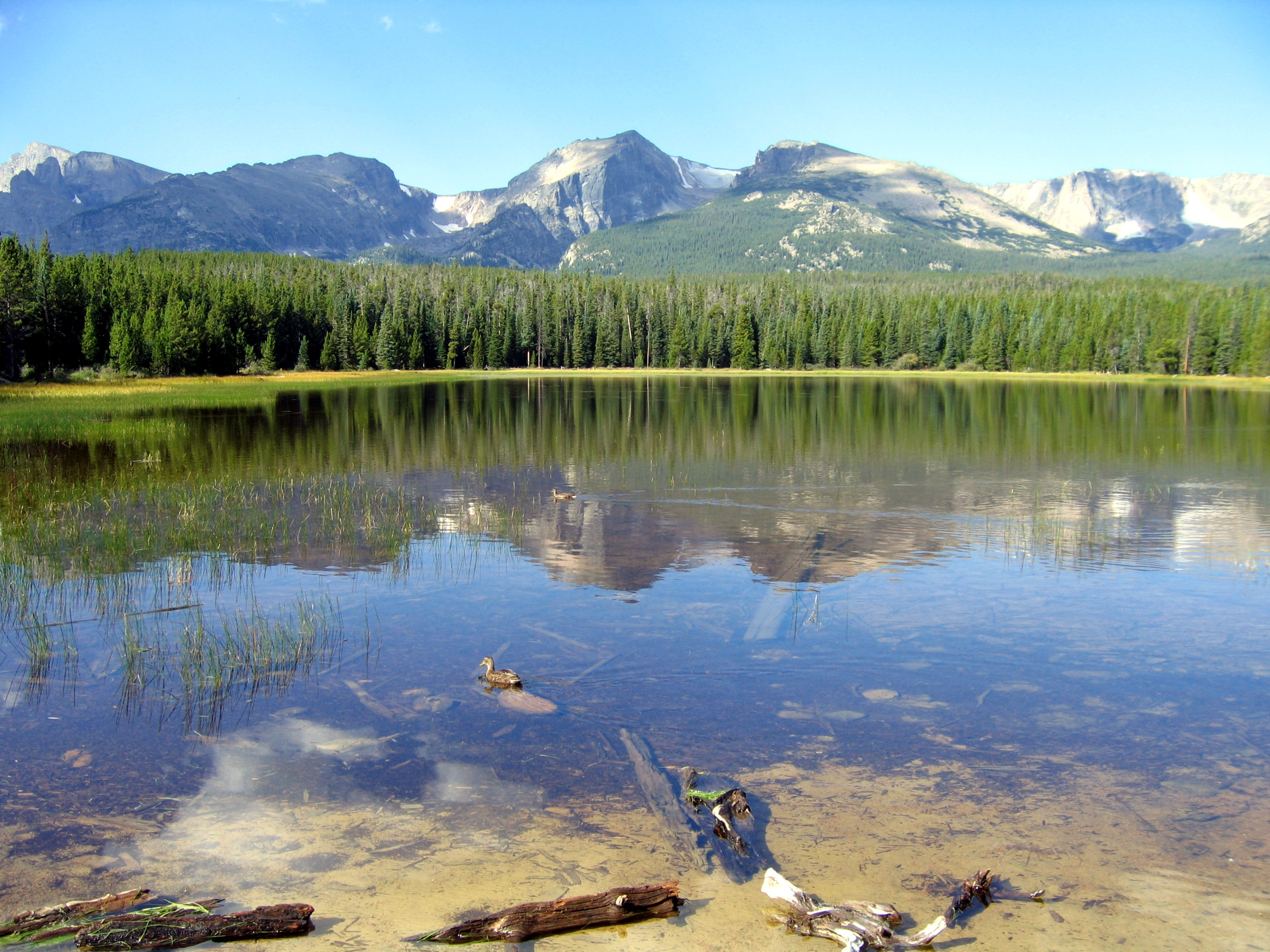

- Location within Colorado Location within the United States
- Location: Larimer County, Colorado
- Coordinates: 40.327°N 105.624°W
- Type: Glacial lake
- Etymology: Albert Bierstadt
- Part of: Mill Creek Basin
- Primary inflows: Upper Mill Creek
- Primary outflows: Mill Creek
- Managing agency: Rocky Mountain National Park
- Designation: 1932
- Surface elevation: 9,419 ft (2,871 m)
- Settlements: Estes Park, Colorado
- Website: RMNP Bierstadt Lake

Bierstadt Lake is located in Larimer County, Colorado and within the Rocky Mountain National Park. Near McHenrys Peak and Longs Peak, there are "spectacular views" of the Continental Divide at the lake. The Bierstadt Lake Trailhead is located about 6.5 miles (10.5 km) from the turn-off at U.S. Route 36 into the Rocky Mountain National Park. During the summer, shuttle buses provide transportation to the trailhead.

The lake sits atop a lateral moraine on the side and end of Bartholf Glacier and drains into Mill Creek. It is named for Albert Bierstadt, a noted landscape artist, whose 1870s paintings of Longs Peak and Bierstadt Lake are among the Denver Art Museum's collection.

== Geology and hydrology ==
Bierstadt Lake rests on a plateau on the Bierstadt Moraine, which is a "massive" moraine created by debris left from the receding Bartholf Glacier. The glacier, never more than 8 miles (13 km) long, "originated on the highest mountain in the park". Because it was a steep glacier, "its gouging action was vigorous". Glacial lobes at Glacier Gorge, Loch Vale, and Flattop Mountain joined and moved iced in Barthlolf Park. Debris trapped in the ice created the Bierstadt Moraine that lies between Glacier and Mill Creeks and is more than 1 mile (1.6 km) wide and is more than 900 feet (270 m) above the floor of Bartholf Park. The lake was formed when a dam was made from glacial debris deposits. Water from the lake drains into Mill Creek within the Mill Creek basin, which is a flat valley with a scenic meadow. Author Lisa Foster describes the long glacial ridge as "one of the most dramatic lateral moraines in the Rocky Mountain National Park". On the north side of the moraine is Hollowell Park and the Mill Creek Basin. The steep south side sits above Bear Creek Road.

== History ==
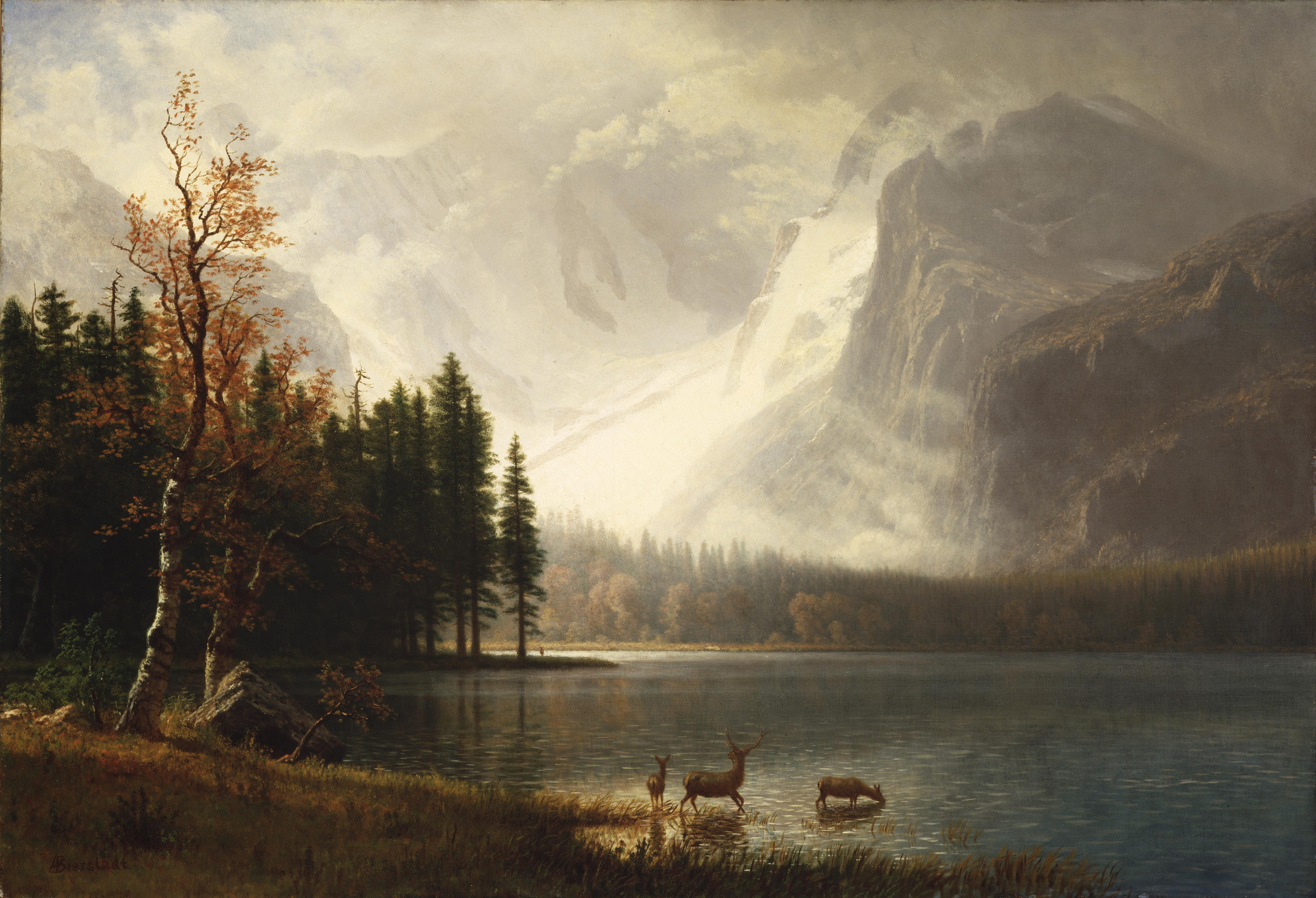
Albert Bierstadt, Whyte's Lake, c. 1877, Estes Park, Colorado. The lake may have been a man-made lake that was washed out in a flood the following year, or what is now known as Bierstadt Lake.

It was first called "Hanging Lake" by Native Americans due to its "perched condition" on the side of Bartholf Glacier. Bierstadt Lake was officially given its name in 1932, prior to that the name was on a reprinted U.S. Geological Survey map created in 1922. Like Mount Bierstadt, it was named to honor Albert Bierstadt, a landscape artist, who visited and painted the Rocky Mountains. He may have become the first European to visit the summit of Mount Blue Sky when he climbed it in 1863. Mount Blue Sky is 1.5 miles (2.4 km) from Mount Bierstadt. In 1876, Bierstadt was commissioned by Windham Wyndham-Quin, 4th Earl of Dunraven and Mount-Earl to make an exceptionally large canvas painting of Longs Peak and Estes Park for $15,000, equivalent to $453,516 in 2025. Bierstadt traveled throughout the area with Theodore Whyte, the earl's associate, and created sketches and paintings. The two men also looked for a suitable site, with a great view of Longs Peak, to construct an English hotel for the earl. Bierstadt took a particular interest in the lake, and Whyte is credited for naming the lake in honor of the artist. He "created one of his many spectacular images of the West" at the lake. Harold Marion Dunning, an early historian, chronicled "that Bierstadt's favorite place for mountain sketches and material for some of his famous paintings was on the shore of the lake that now bears his name".

Bierstadt created a painting of the lake that would bear his name. The work of art is now in the Denver Art Museum's collection. According to the Buffalo Bill Center of the West, Peter Hassrick thought that Bierstadt's 1877 painting, which has "Whyte's Lake" written on its back, may have been initially named for Whyte and later renamed for Bierstadt. There is also a claim that Whyte's Lake was a man-made lake that was washed out in a flood the year after the painting was made.

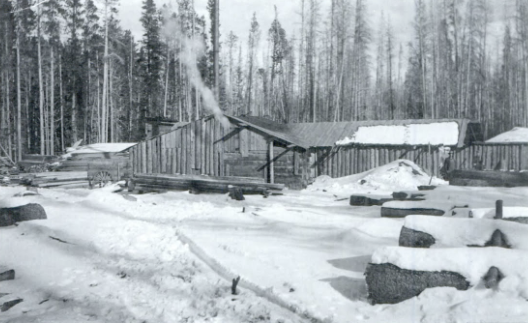
By 1907, the Griffith Sawmill near Bierstadt Lake supplied lumber for the farming and ranching settlements that were founded in the area.

The lake was situated on the abandoned Mill Creek Road and near the site of the Mill Creek Ranger Station.

By 1907, the Griffith Sawmill near Bierstadt Lake supplied lumber for nearby farming and ranching settlements. Sawmills often operated through the winter, conveying lumber with sleds, to meet the construction needs of the settlers and shopkeepers. Women moved into the area by 1910, after many buildings had been constructed. Lumber from the sawmill was used in the construction of The Stanley Hotel. In 1910, Griffith moved their sawmill to a spur of Highway 66 [now U.S. Route 34].

== Rocky Mountain National Park ==
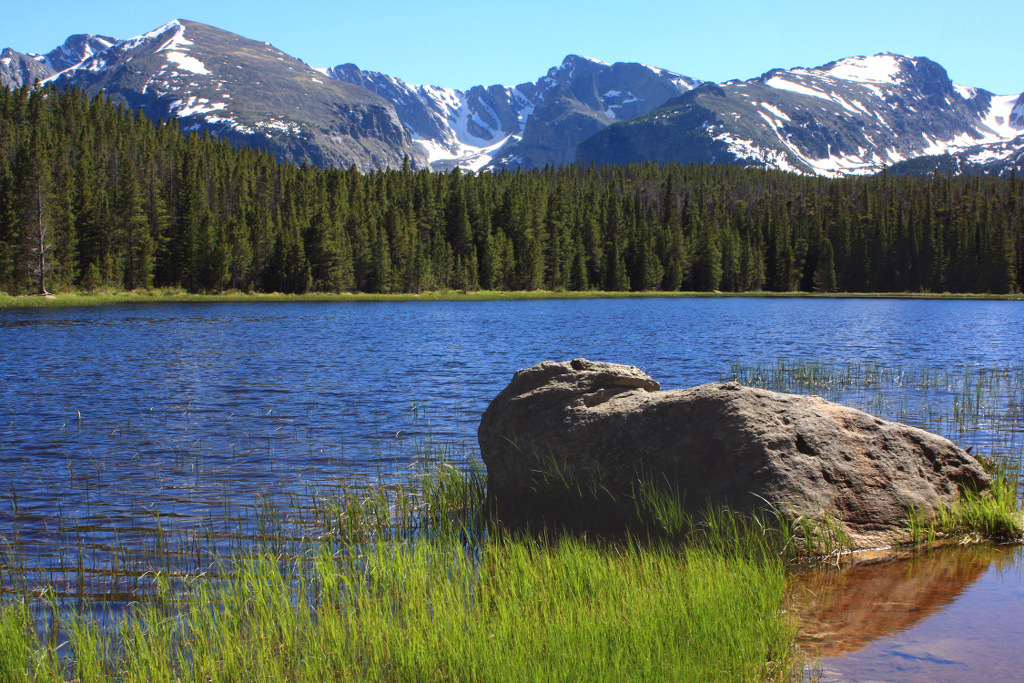
Mountains south of Bierstadt Lake

The lake is located off of Bear Lake Road in the "Heart of the Park," so named because of the great views and easy access. Trail Gazette states that "different scenic routes [trails] provide marvelous opportunities for photographic subjects such as scenery, flora and fauna, geographic and geological features." Flora in the area around the lake includes aspen and pine trees. A dense pine forest encircles Bierstadt Lake, and the lake "is ringed by sedges that give it a very serene appearance." Fauna in the area are waterfowl, Abert's squirrel, deer and elk.

There are two trails, according to the Rocky Mountain National Park, through dense forests that lead to Bierstadt Lake within the park. An easy, mostly downhill trail runs 1.6 miles (2.6 km) through pine and aspen forests. It begins at Bear Lake Trailhead and runs along Bear Lake. Another is an uphill 1.4-mile (2.3 km) trail with switchbacks that begins at the Bierstadt Lake Trailhead. About 1/10 mile (0.2 km) into the trail is a horse corral. Near the lake are Longs Peak, Flattop Mountain, Hallett Peak, and Tyndall Glacier. A 0.6-mile (0.97 km) trail encircles the subalpine lake, which has a sandy beach along the eastern portion of the lake.

The scenic Hollowell Park trail leads to the Bierstadt Lake area through dense sagebrush and meadows on the north side of Bierstadt Moraine and to the Mill Creek Basin. Fern Lake and Cub Lake trails are also in the vicinity. No picnicking or fishing is allowed.
