= Bijou Creek =

Physical characteristics
- Source
  - coordinates: 39°51′25″N 104°07′10″W
- Mouth
  - location: Confluence with South Platte
  - coordinates: 40°17′07″N 103°51′40″W
  - elevation: 4,291 ft (1,308 m)
- Basin size: 1,395 mi^{2} (3,610 km^{2})

Basin features
- Progression: South Platte—Platte— Missouri—Mississippi

Bijou Creek is a 45.5-mile-long (73.2 km) tributary of the South Platte River in Colorado. The creek flows northeast from elevated terrain in southeastern Adams County to a confluence with the South Platte near Fort Morgan. Bijou Creek is subject to flash floods from time to time.

Bijou Creek, originally named Bijeau Creek, was named for Joseph Bijeau, a guide on Stephen Harriman Long's expedition of the Great Plains in 1820.

The alluvium that irrigators in the lower Bijou Basin drew water from since 1935 when the first wells were dug is deposited in a shallow channel eroded in Pierre Shale which is flanked on its sides by the Fox Hills Formation. The ground water in the alluvium, for the most part, originates in the flow of Bijou Creek. The area where irrigation occurred, as of 1961, was about 84 square miles, or 53,750 acres. It was estimated, in a CSU study, that about 1 million acre-feet of ground water was present in the alluvium as of 1948. At a depletion rate of 70,000 acre-feet per year, the supply was forecast to eventually be exhausted by irrigators. 173 operating irrigation wells were serving some 15,500 acres of crop lands in 1956.

== See also ==
- List of rivers of Colorado
