= Rufus Sage =

American writer, journalist and mountain man

Rufus B. Sage
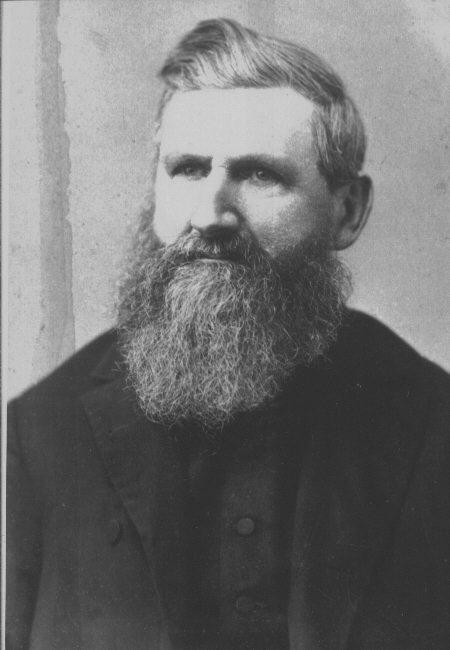
- Born: March 17, 1817; Cromwell, Connecticut
- Died: December 23, 1893 (aged 76); Cromwell, Connecticut
- Occupations: writer, journalist, mountain man
- Years active: 1836-1893
- Known for: Scenes in the Rocky Mountains

Rufus B. Sage (1817–1893) was an American writer, journalist and later mountain man. He is known as the author of Scenes in the Rocky Mountains published in 1846, depicting the life of fur trappers.

== Life ==
Rufus B. Sage was born on March 17, 1817, to the family of Deacon Rufus Sage, in Cromwell, Connecticut, beforehand known as Middletown. He was the youngest of seven children. His father died when Rufus was 9 which left him in trouble of self-educating and raising. However, due to his vigour and determination Sage was able to self-tutor himself and start working as a printer in the Middleton newspaper.

In fall of 1836 he moved to Washington County, Ohio, where he became teacher and junior intern at the Marietta Gazette. Thereupon in the spring of 1838, he embarked on an enterprise which took him southward with a cargo of ice. He made little money from this business venture. He decided from his observations in Louisiana and Mississippi that he disliked slavery.

After returning to the northern United States, he settled in Circleville, Ohio, out of which base he became well known as a writer, speaker and activist. He organised a debating club, which became very popular, and his press connections brought him in contact with the most prominent citizens of the country. In 1839 he moved to Columbus, Ohio, and began working at the Ohio State Bulletin.

In early 1840 Sage became a part of the political campaign of William Henry Harrison for president. At first he edited and published a weekly campaign paper, later on a daily one in support of Harrison and other Whig candidates.

After the political campaign he decided to venture west of the Mississippi River.

Sage organized a party to explore the American west. Despite the fact that his party was scarce, Sage ventured onwards and later joined a party of traders with Native Americans. This period was later described in his famous recollections entitled Scenes in the Rocky Mountains.

In July, 1844, he returned to Columbus and commenced a campaign to support Henry Clay in becoming U.S. president. He supported Clay due to his opposition to the annexation of Texas. In part this was because Sage felt the incorporation of a Texas allowing slavery would allow the contamination of African-American slavery longer.

Later on Sage became editor of the Chillicothe Gazette, and worked there until 1845, when he returned to visit his home town. In the quiet of his house he prepared his recollections for printing. But his future ideas of travel and adventure had to be changed – his elderly and invalid mother convinced Sage to marry and settle down. He did so and lived for the rest of his life in Cromwell.

Rufus B. Sage died on December 23, 1893.
