= Timber Gap (California) =

Mountain Pass in California

- Deer Pass
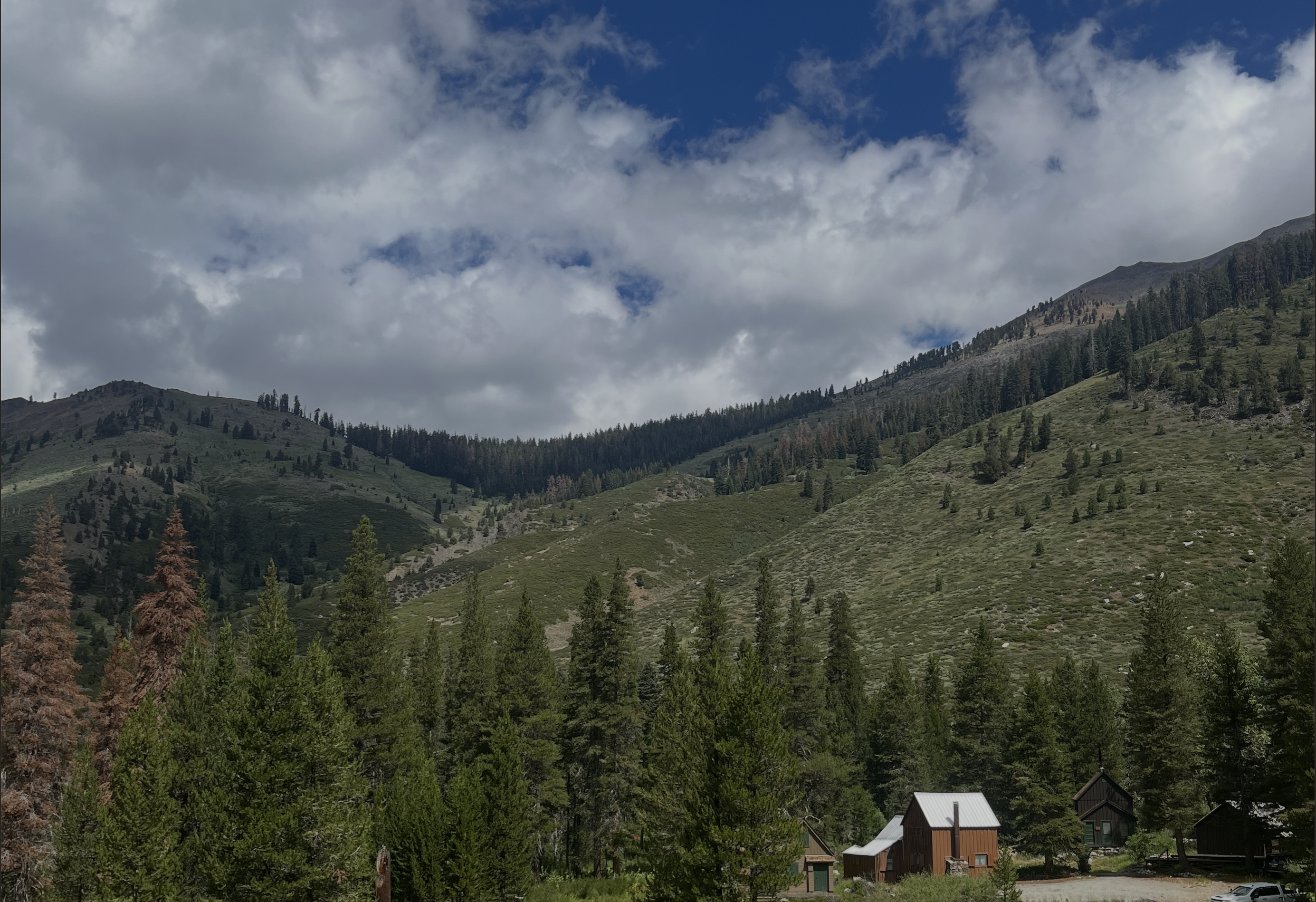
- Timber Gap as seen from Pogue Road in Mineral King. Historic Cabins can be seen in the foreground (September 2, 2023).

Highest point
- Elevation: 9,512 ft (2,899 m)
- Parent peak: Empire Mountain
- Coordinates: 36°28′5.79″N 118°35′57.34″W

Geography
- Country: United States
- State: California
- District: Tulare County
- Parent range: Sierra Nevada

Geology
- Orogeny: Nevadan Orogeny

Climbing
- Easiest route: Hike

Timber Gap is a 9,512 foot (2,899 m) mountain pass in the Mineral King valley in California's Sequoia National Park. It is one of the primary routes by which backpackers enter and exit the valley.

== Geography ==
Timber Gap lies at the northern end of the Mineral King valley, in the southern Sierra Nevada mountains, on the western slopes of Empire Mountain. It is situated on the divide between the East Fork Kaweah River and Cliff Creek and the Middle Fork Kaweah River.

The Timber Gap trail is a 2 mile hiking trail that ascends from the Sawtooth Pass parking lot to Timber Gap, and provides access to trails in the Kaweah Valley such as Redwood Meadow, Cliff Creek and Bearpaw High Sierra Camp.

A small spring-fed tributary to Cliff Creek, Timber Gap Creek, has its source on the northern side of Timber Gap.

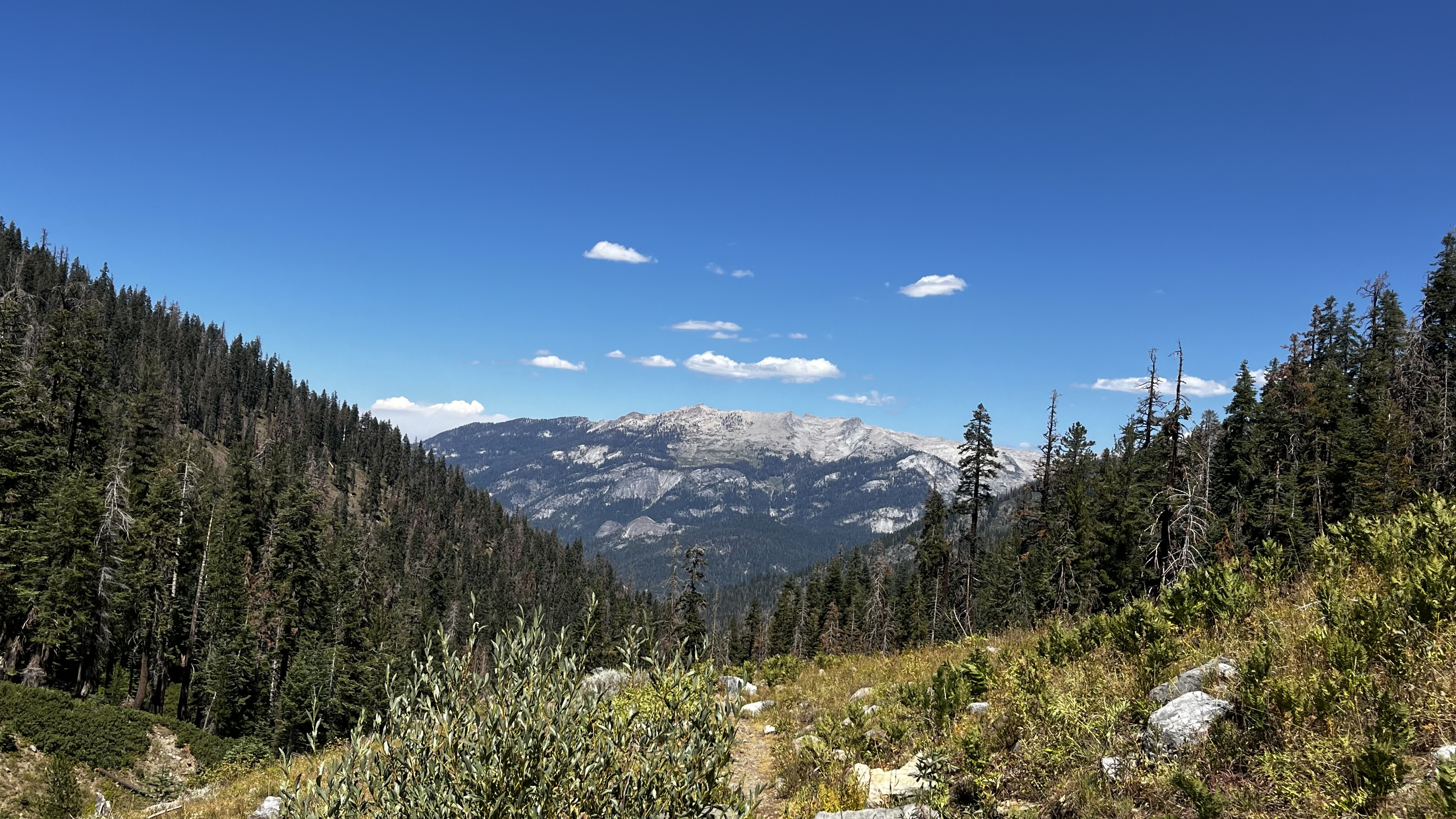
The view north into the canyon of the Middle Fork Kaweah River from Timber Gap. The high granite mountains separating Sequoia and Kings Canyon National Park are visible in the distance (September 1st, 2025).

== See also ==
- Farewell Gap
- Franklin Pass
