= White Chief Canyon =

Valley in California, United States

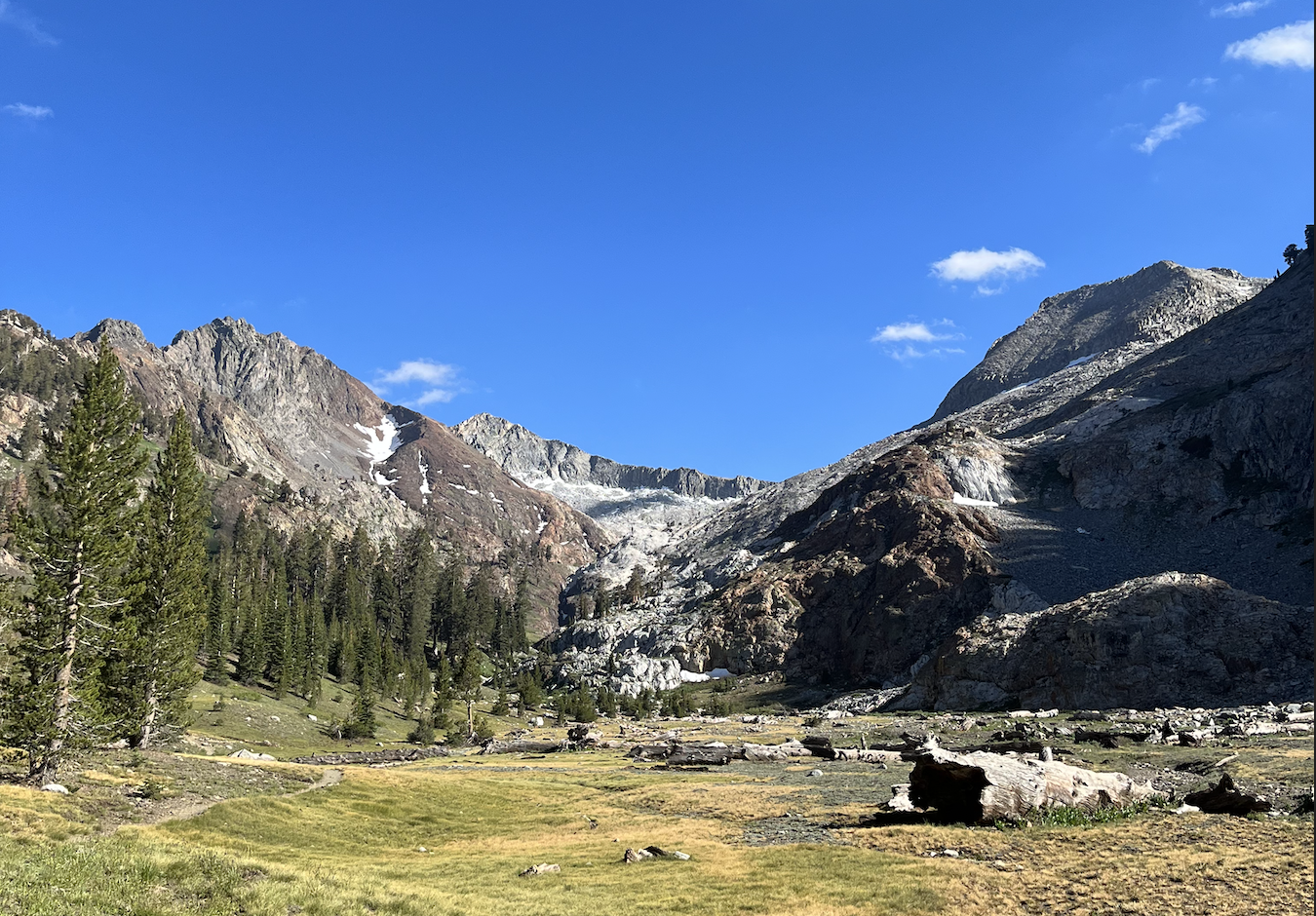
- Looking up the White Chief Canyon in the Mineral King Valley of Sequoia National Park (June 19th, 2022)
- Floor elevation: 9,636 ft (2,937 m)

Geography
- Coordinates: 36.405281°N 118.597682°W
- Interactive map of White Chief Canyon

White Chief Canyon is an alpine glacial valley in the Mineral King area of Sequoia National Park in the US state of California. The canyon was the site of intensive silver and lead mining operations from the 1870s to the early 1900s.

== Geography ==
White Chief Canyon lies in the upper reaches of the Mineral King Valley, along its southwestern rim. It is the most extensive of the three hanging valleys that make up the western edge of the Mineral King Area.

It is immediately west of Farewell Gap and Vandever Mountain, which lie on the southern border of Sequoia National Park with the Golden Trout Wilderness.

The upper portions of the White Chief Canyon bear visible scars from the mining industry; a number of vertical and horizontal mine shafts are still open, particularly around the mineral-bearing outcrops of marble, and blasted rock and tailings cover large areas.

The remnants of the cabin of the original claimant of the White Chief Lode, James Crabtree, can still be found in the meadows near the mouth of the canyon.

The 2.9 mile White Chief Trail ascends the west side of the Mineral King Valley from the end of Mineral King Road to the canyon and is popular with day hikers.

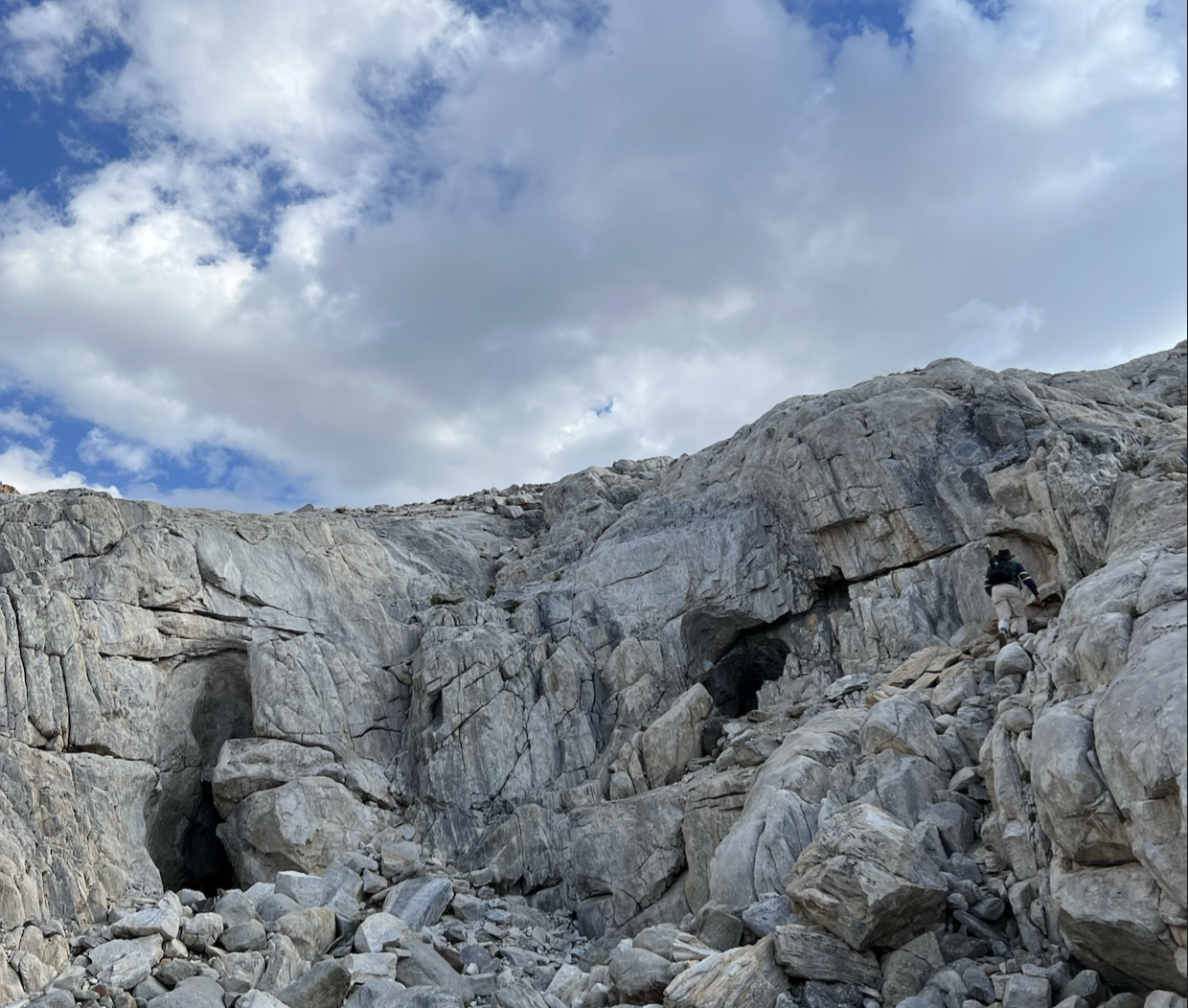
Two abandoned mineshafts cut into granite and marble in the upper White Chief Canyon. Mines such as these should be approached with caution (September 3rd, 2022)

The high headwaters of the East Fork Kaweah River drain the canyon. Due to the area's unique limestone and marble geology, the river goes underground and reemerges at the surface at multiple points throughout the valley. The river often has no surface flow in the lowest parts of the canyon.

== History ==
White Chief Canyon was among the first places in the Mineral King Area to be claimed by prospectors during the silver rushes of the 1870s. The name "White Chief" comes from a story told by early prospector James Crabtree, who claimed that he was guided to the mineral-bearing deposits in the canyon by a vision of a white Native American chief.

The galena ore sought by the miners turned out to be difficult to process into precious metals, and similarly to the Empire Mine on nearby Empire Mountain at the other end of the Mineral King valley, the remoteness and ruggedness of the location combined to make mining the lode unprofitable, even for large mining conglomerates like the New England Smelting and Tunnel company.

After the silver rushes of the 1870s subsided in the Mineral King area, mining continued in White Chief Canyon sporadically until the 1920s, when the area had yet to be included in Sequoia National Park.

== Ecology ==
Due to its high elevation, White Chief Canyon exhibits species typical of the upper montane and the alpine zones. The lower section of White Chief canyon is covered by an extensive alpine meadow bisected by the channel of the East Fork Kaweah river, with areas of montane forest composed mostly of Jeffrey Pine (Pinus jeffreyi) and White Fir (Abies concolor)

== See also ==
- Mineral King
- Farewell Gap
- Silver City, California
- Sequoia National Park
