= Empire Mountain =

Mountain in California

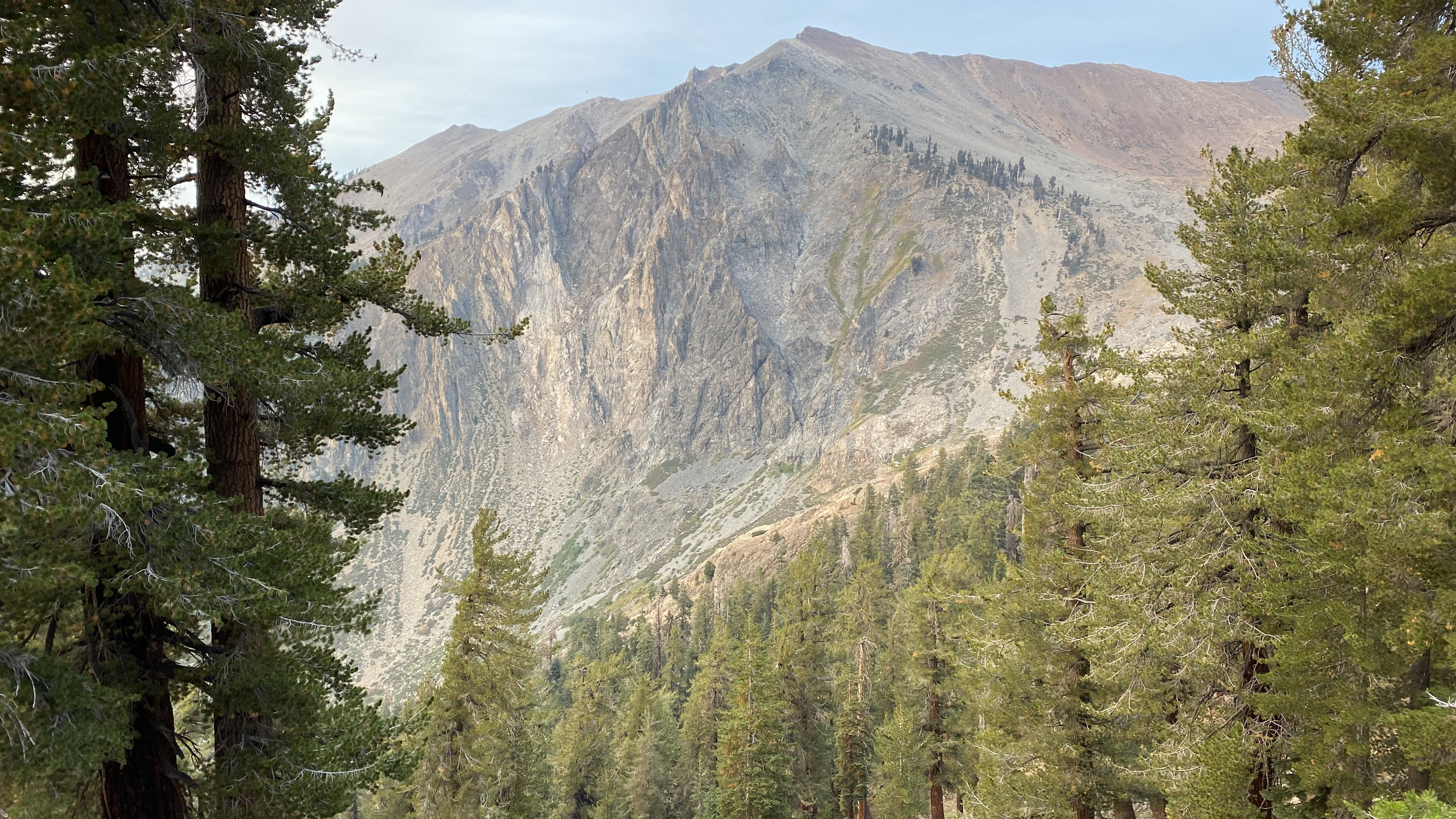
- Rugged cliffs on Empire Mountain tower over Groundhog meadow in the Mineral King area of Sequoia National Park (September 6th, 2020)

Highest point
- Elevation: 11,555 ft (3,522 m)

Geography
- Country: United States
- State: California
- Parent range: Sierra Nevada

Geology
- Orogeny: Nevadan
- Rock type: Metamorphic

Empire Mountain is an 11,555-foot (3,522 m) mountain in the Sierra Nevada in the US state of California. It is a prominent feature of the geography of the Mineral King valley in Sequoia National Park.

The mountain is known locally for being the site of a series of intense silver rushes in the 1870s.

== Geography ==
Empire Mountain is situated on the Great Western Divide in the southern Sierra Nevada mountain range in California. It comprises part of the eastern side of the Mineral King valley. It is located immediately north of Sawtooth Peak. The mountain is conspicuously visible from much of the lower Mineral King valley.

On the mountain's western flank lies Timber Gap, a very popular backpacking route into the Middle Fork Kaweah River valley and the core of Sequoia National Park.

Empire Mountain forms the northern wall of Monarch Creek canyon as it descends to its confluence with the East Fork Kaweah River near the Sawtooth pass trailhead.

== Geology ==
The rocks that comprise Empire mountain are mainly metamorphic rocks of the Paleozoic and Mesozoic era (541 - 145 mya), which predate the granites of the Sierra Nevada Batholith that dominate most of the mountain range; though a significant portion of the mountain is composed of granite. Rock types found on Empire mountain are mainly schist, quartz diorite, gabbro and tuff. The mountain has a distinct form and color from the white-grey granitic mountains of the Great Western Divide.

Much of the mineral-bearing rocks on Empire mountain and the surrounding area occur in areas of contact between the older Mesozoic rocks and the younger granites of the intruding Sierra Nevada Batholith.

Empire mountain, and much of the Mineral King area, represents a geologic setting in which the older metamorphic and sedimentary rocks of the Paleozoic were not fully eroded away by the intruding batholith as they were in much of the Sierra Nevada, and were instead uplifted and faulted to their present positions, leading to the wide range of rock types and colors seen in the valley today.

== Ecology ==
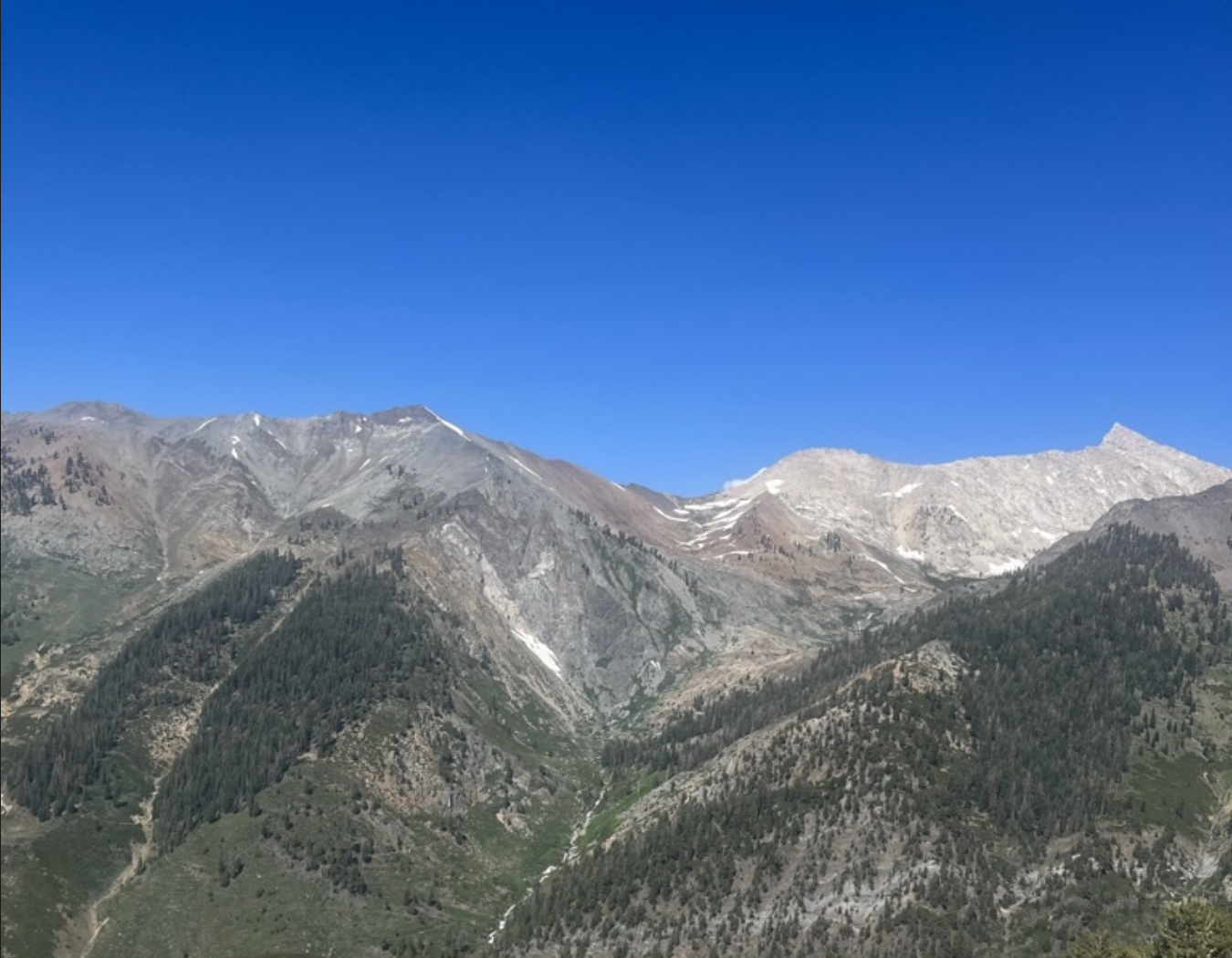
Empire Mountain (left) and Sawtooth (right). Monarch Creek can be seen cascading down the canyon walls between the two mountains. Note the lack of vegetation on the upper portions of both mountains (July 29th, 2023)

Empire Mountain is host to a number of different ecosystems. On its lower slopes, Sierra Nevada Montane forest predominates, with Jeffrey Pine (Pinus jeffreyi), White Fir (Abies concolor), Sugar Pine (Pinus lambertiana) and Incense Cedar (Calocedrus decurrens) being the dominant forest trees. This elevation on the mountain is also host to species of Manzanita (Arctostaphylos sp.) and Currant (Ribes sp.) in exposed areas. Mule deer, marmots and american black bear are commonly encountered at these elevations.

At 9,000 feet and above, forest cover begins to reduce, and species typical of the subalpine zone like Whitebark Pine (Pinus albicaulis) and the endemic Foxtail pine (Pinus balfouriana) represent the only large plants able to cope with the harsh conditions.

Above around 10,500 feet, trees and most other species of plants are absent due to the incredibly harsh winters and short growing seasons (typically only about 3 months), with lichens and tiny, low-growing plants like cushion plants and alpine grasses (Poa sp.) comprising the only flora at this elevation. The endangered pika is one of the keystone species of this zone.

== History ==
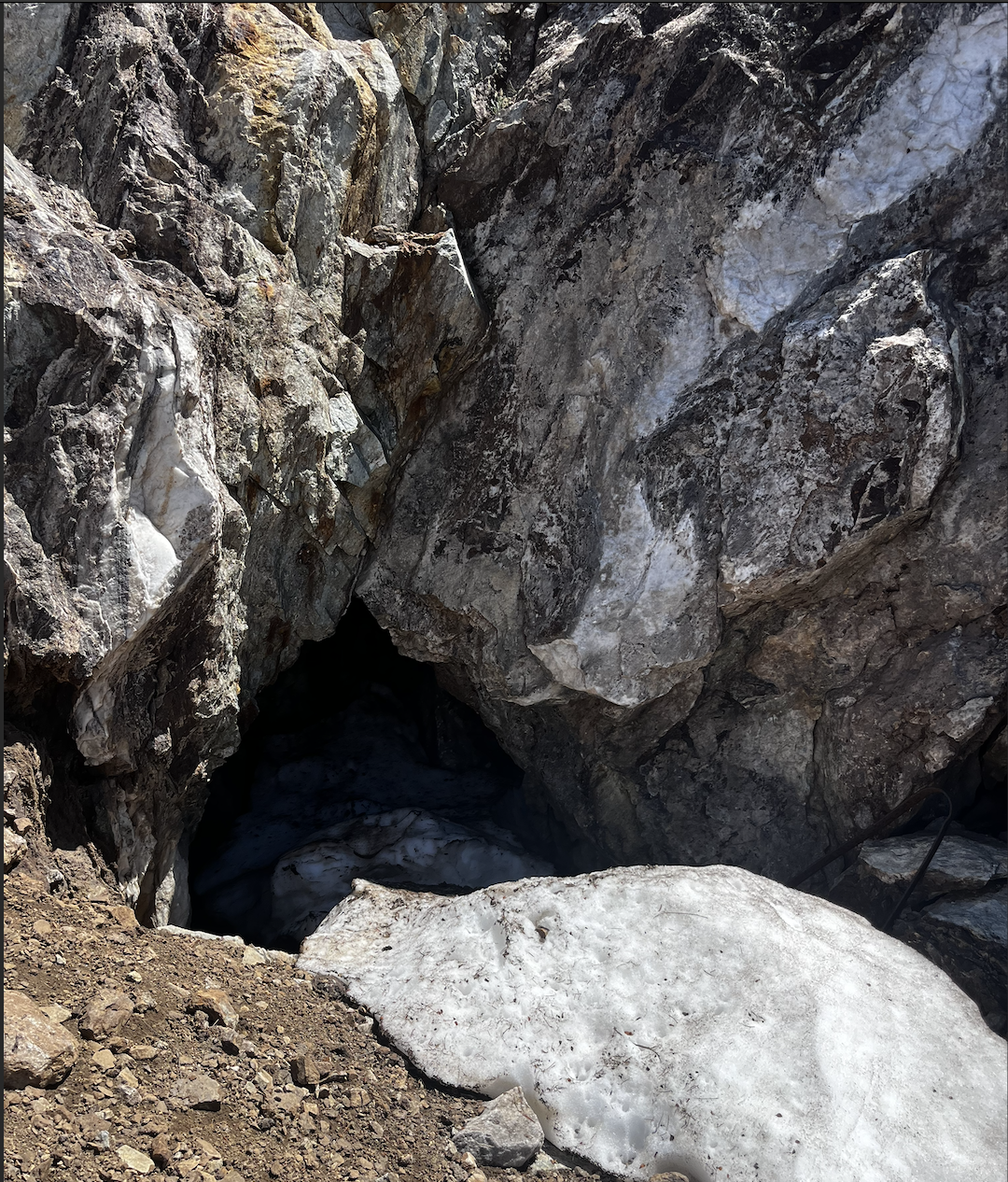
A vertical shaft of the Empire Mine high on Empire Mountain, the largest and most well-funded mining venture in the Mineral King area (June 10th, 2025)

The Mineral King valley was relatively unknown to Euro-American settlers by the middle of the 19th century, save for a small set of hunters and prospectors that were familiar with the region. The conspicuous geology of the area attracted prospectors beginning in the 1860s. In 1872, a group of prospectors led by James Crabtree of Porterville, California, discovered a promising silver vein in White Chief Canyon in upper Mineral King, starting a silver rush in the area that lasted until 1875. Empire Mountain and its surroundings were extensively prospected for precious metals and over 100 mining claims were established in the valley by the middle of the 1870s.

In 1878, the Empire Mine was purchased by Tom Fowler of Visalia, California, who sourced funding for the construction of a tramway, stamp mill and road to facilitate silver ore production. Despite considerable investment in mining on Empire Mountain, the ore extracted from the mines proved to be of a low grade. This fact, coupled with the remoteness and ruggedness of the area and the difficulty of maintaining infrastructure in such a place, as well as a destructive avalanche in 1880, contributed to the closure of the mines by the 1880s. The remnants of mining infrastructure, including the foundations for the tramway and cabins, can still be found on Empire Mountain today.

A number of abandoned mines, in various states of decay, exist on the upper portions of the mountain. These shafts are unsafe and unstable, and should not be entered. Many have been intentionally-collapsed.

== See also ==
- Mineral King
- Sequoia National Park
- Kaweah River
- Silver City, California
- Ecology of the Sierra Nevada
