= Monarch Creek =

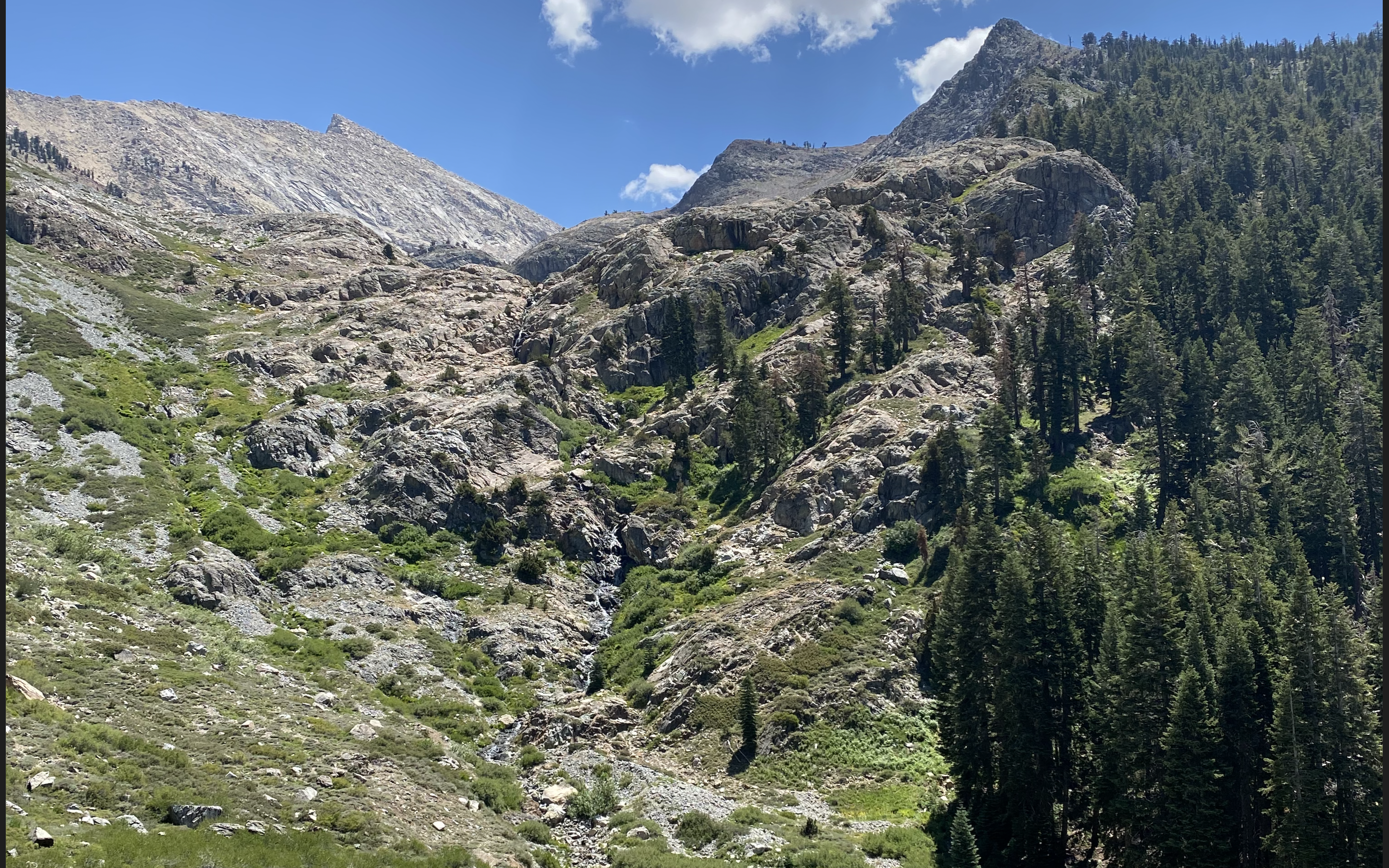
- Monarch Creek as seen in Groundhog Meadows, with Sawtooth Peak in the background

Location
- Country: United States
- State: California

Physical characteristics
- Source: Monarch Lakes
  - elevation: 10,648 ft (3,245 m)
- Mouth
  - coordinates: 36.4521637°N 118.5987045°W
  - elevation: 7,759 ft (2,365 m)
- Length: ~2.26 miles

Basin features
- Waterfalls: Black Wolf Falls

Monarch Creek is an approximately 2.26 mile long (3.63 km) creek in the Mineral King Valley of Sequoia National Park in the US state of California. It is a tributary of the East Fork Kaweah River.

== Course ==
Monarch Creek has its source in the high-elevation Monarch Lakes on Sawtooth Peak, at an elevation of 10,648 feet above sea level. It takes a steep descent of over 2,800 feet nearly due westward over a series of large cascades broken up by flat subalpine meadows. Its course is heavily defined by the glacial topography of the area.

Close to its outlet in the East Fork Kaweah River, Monarch Creek descends over Black Wolf Falls, a conspicous landmark in the Mineral King Valley and a popular location for visitors.

== Geography ==
Monarch Creek is located in the Mineral King Valley, near the southern boundary of Sequoia National Park in California. It is one of 7 perennial creeks originating in the alpine lakes that ring the valley.

The Sawtooth Pass trail follows the creek until the area of Groundhog meadow, where a new trail has been constructed that passes out of Monarch Creek canyon until approaching Monarch lakes.

Monarch Creek crosses under the final mile of Mineral King Road just above its mouth.

A number of cabins in the Mineral King Road Cultural Landscape are located on or near the creek as it joins with the East Fork Kaweah.

== Ecology ==
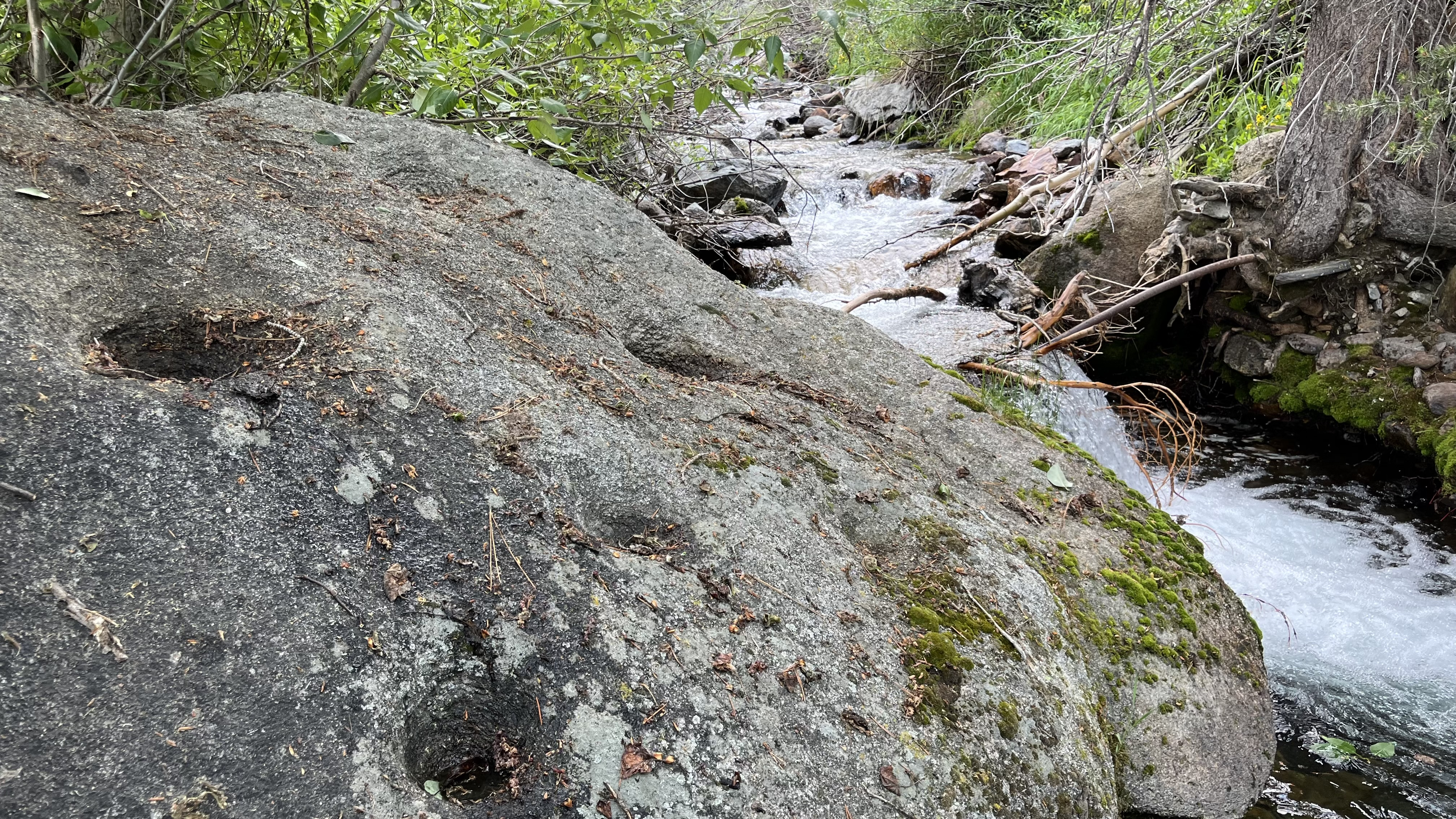
A boulder on the banks of Monarch Creek with bedrock mortars created by members of the Yokuts and Monache peoples for the purpose of processing seeds, acorns and other nuts. The native inhabitants were driven from the region during the California genocide of the 1860s (July 14th, 2024)

Monarch Creek's course takes it through a steep elevation gradient and by extension, a variety of habitats found in the Sierra Nevada. At its source 10,648 feet above sea level, Monarch Creek flows through desolate alpine terrain on the western flanks of Sawtooth Peak and Empire Mountain.

Upon reaching around 9,000 feet in elevation, Monarch Creek flows through Sierra Nevada upper montane forest, with denser undergrowth along the creek, notably species of willow (Salix sp.) and forests of Western Juniper (Juniperus occidentalis), Jeffrey pine (Pinus jeffreyi) and Red Fir (Abies magnifica) on higher ground.

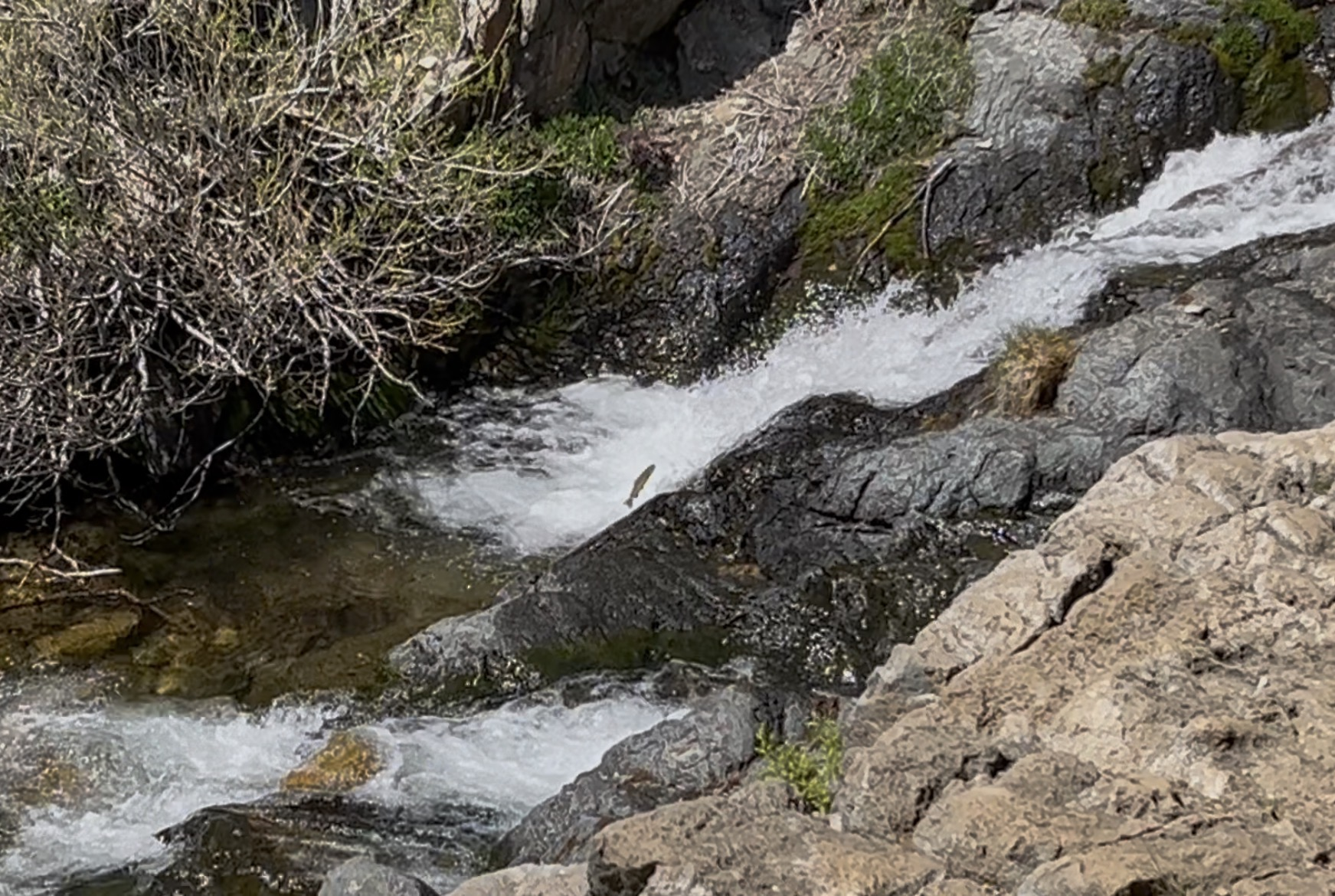
A rainbow trout from the East Fork Kaweah River ascending Monarch Creek during the spring spawn (May 25th, 2026)

Fauna is more common and diverse at this elevation and lower, with Dusky grouse, Mule deer and Golden-mantled ground squirrel being commonly encountered.

Throughout its entire course, Monarch Creek is host to a population of Brook trout.

Below Black Wolf Falls, near the creek's outlet, the species composition becomes dominated by the hybrid rainbow trout that populate the East Fork Kaweah River.

== See also ==
- Mineral King
- Sequoia National Park
- East Fork Kaweah River
- Kaweah River
- California genocide
