= Vandever Mountain =

Mountain in Tulare County, California, U.S.

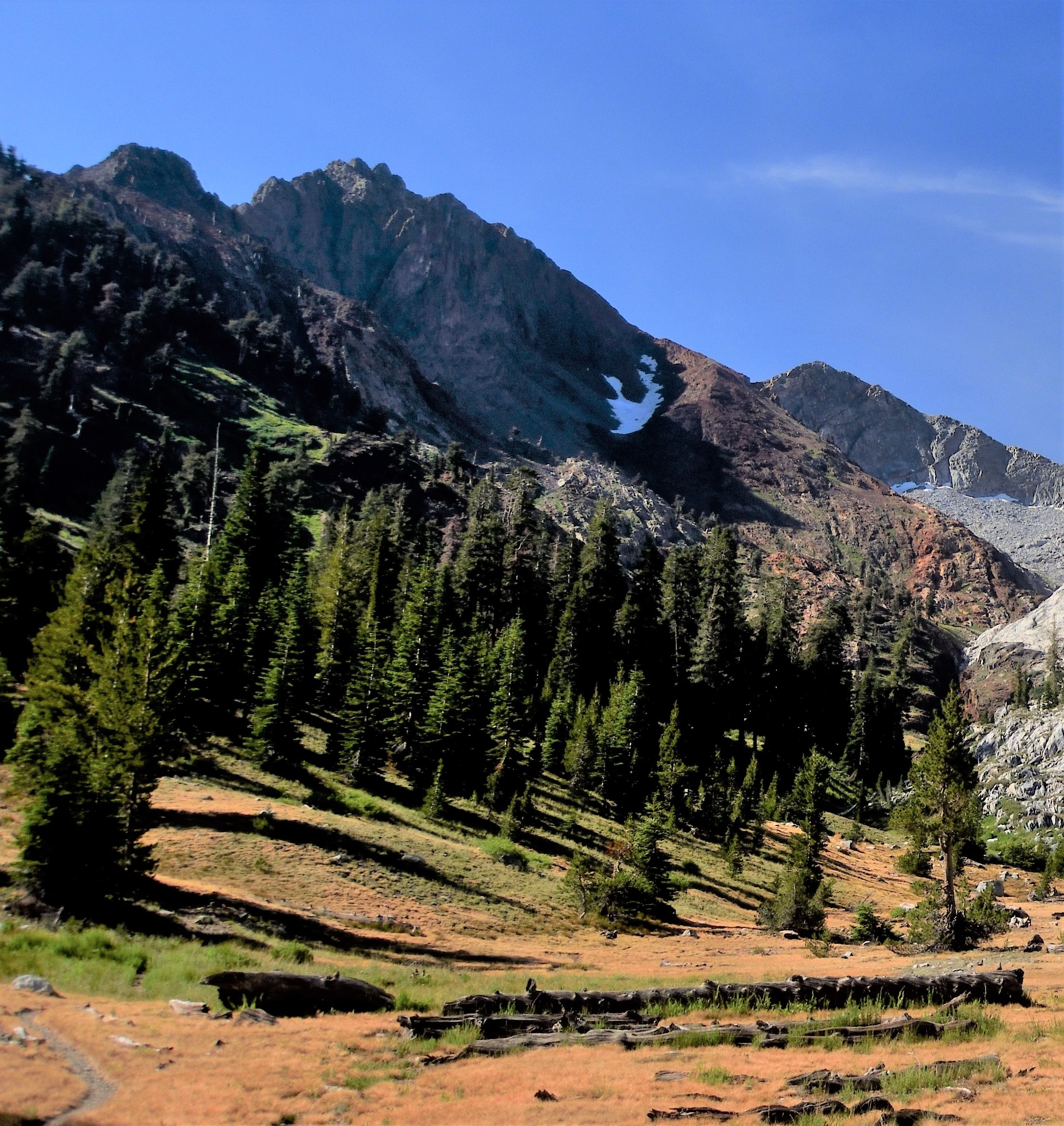
- NNW aspect, from White Chief Canyon

Highest point
- Elevation: 11,947 ft (3,641 m)
- Prominence: 1,361 ft (415 m)
- Parent peak: Florence Peak (12,437 ft)
- Isolation: 1.77 mi (2.85 km)
- Listing: Sierra Peaks Section
- Coordinates: 36°23′54″N 118°34′52″W

Naming
- Etymology: William Vandever

Geography
- Location within California Location within the United States
- Location: Sequoia National Park; Tulare County; California, U.S.
- Parent range: Sierra Nevada
- Topo map: USGS Mineral King

Climbing
- Easiest route: class 2

Vandever Mountain is an 11,947-foot-elevation (3,641-meter) mountain summit located in the Sierra Nevada mountain range, in Tulare County of northern California. It is situated on the shared boundary of Sequoia National Park with Sequoia National Forest, four miles south of Mineral King, and 1.78 miles (2.86 km) west of Florence Peak, the nearest higher neighbor. Vandever Mountain ranks as the 439th highest summit in California. Topographic relief is significant as the south aspect rises 2,000 feet (610 meters) above White Chief Canyon in one mile. The summit can be reached via class 2 hiking from Farewell Gap or White Chief Canyon.

== History ==
This mountain's name was officially adopted by the United States Board on Geographic Names to honor William Vandever (1817–1893), California congressman from 1887 to 1891 who introduced bills establishing Sequoia, Yosemite, and General Grant National Parks. The name was proposed in the Visalia Delta newspaper on September 4, 1890.

== Climate ==
According to the Köppen climate classification system, Vandever Mountain is located in an alpine climate zone. Most weather fronts originate in the Pacific Ocean, and travel east toward the Sierra Nevada mountains. As fronts approach, they are forced upward by the peaks, causing them to drop their moisture in the form of rain or snowfall onto the range (orographic lift). Precipitation runoff from the mountain drains north into tributaries of Kaweah River, and south into the Little Kern River.

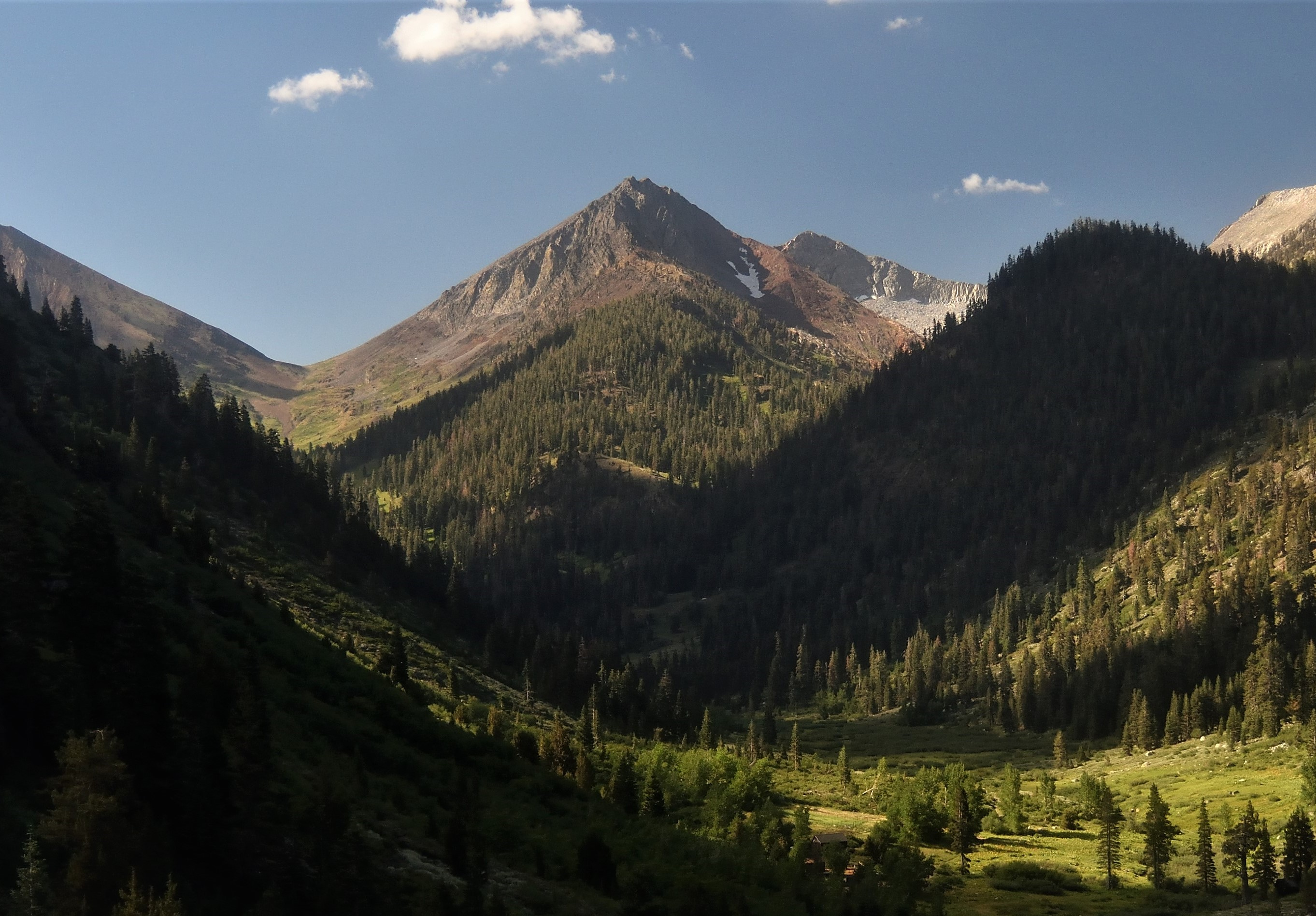
Vandever Mountain, north aspect

== See also ==
- List of mountain peaks of California
