= Redwood Meadow Grove (Sequoia National Park) =

Grove of Giant Sequoia in Sequoia National Park

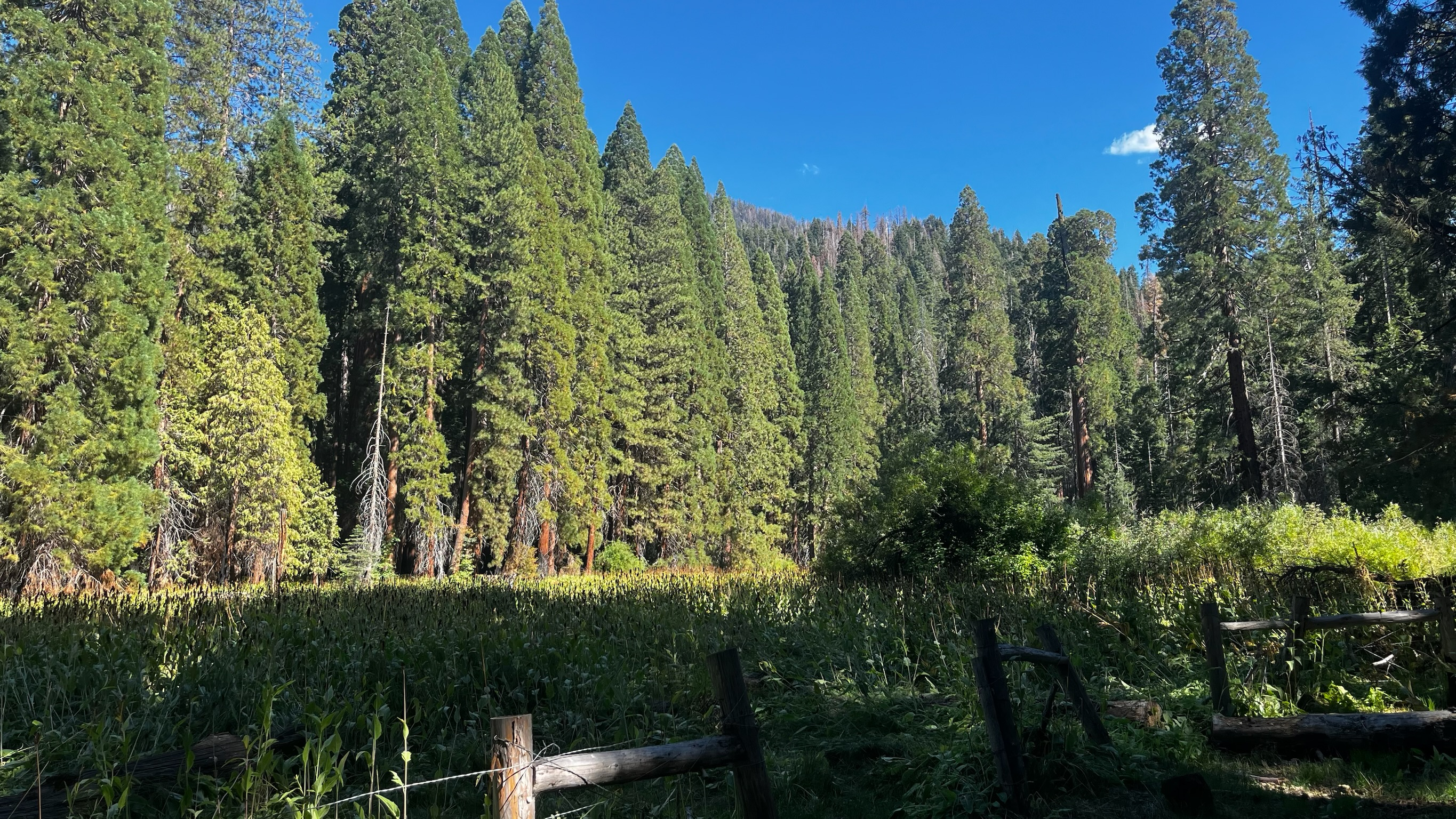
- Redwood Meadow, surrounded by a mix of California Incense Cedar and Giant Sequoias (September 1st, 2025)
- Interactive map of Redwood Meadow Grove

Geography
- Location: Tulare County, California, United States
- Coordinates: 36°32′N 118°38′W
- Elevation: 5,561 ft (1,695 m)

Administration
- Authority: National Park Service

Ecology
- Ecosystem: Sierra Nevada lower montane forest

The Redwood Meadow Grove is a complex of groves of Giant Sequoia (Sequoiadendron giganteum) located near the confluence of Cliff Creek and the Middle Fork Kaweah River in Sequoia National Park, in Tulare County, California. It is not to be confused with the Long Meadow Grove (also called Redwood Meadow Grove) in the adjacent Sequoia National Forest.

It is one of the most remote groves of Giant Sequoia accessible via a maintained trail.

== Geography ==
The area is home to a National Park Service ranger station and infrastructure for keeping horses. It is the intersection point of multiple trails which access Atwell Mill Campground, Silver City, Bearpaw Meadow High Sierra Camp and the Middle Fork Trail along the Kaweah River

It is located close to the Little Redwood Meadow Grove and the Granite Creek Grove of Giant Sequoias, which lie to the northeast.

== Ecology ==
The Redwood Meadow Grove is not a single, contiguous stand of Giant Sequoias like some higher elevation groves, but instead a complex of multiple smaller groups of trees scattered throughout a hillside and bench just above the confluence of Cliff Creek and the Middle Fork Kaweah River. At 5,561 feet (1,694 m) above sea level, the Redwood Meadow grove is somewhat low in elevation, and is thus found in a mixed forest of Black Oak (Quercus kelloggii), Canyon Live Oak (Quercus chrysolepis), California Incense Cedar (Calocedrus decurrens) and Ponderosa Pine (Pinus ponderosa), among other species.

Black-tailed deer, American black bear and a variety of other fauna inhabit the area, which lies in one of the most biodiverse elevation zones in the Sierra Nevada.

Sequoia Groves are generally found in areas with consistent moisture either from snowmelt or streams. Though there is not surface water in the meadow in most seasons, the Sequoias benefit from and rely on the abundance of groundwater in and around the meadow.

The 2023 Redwood Fire burned through the grove at a relatively low intensity, reducing fuels and increasing resilience to future drought and fire cycles.

== See also ==
- List of giant sequoia groves
- Giant Forest
- Redwood Mountain Grove
- Coast Redwood
- Mineral King
