= Farewell Gap =

Mountain pass in California

Coordinates: 36°23′57.79″N 118°34′17.33″W

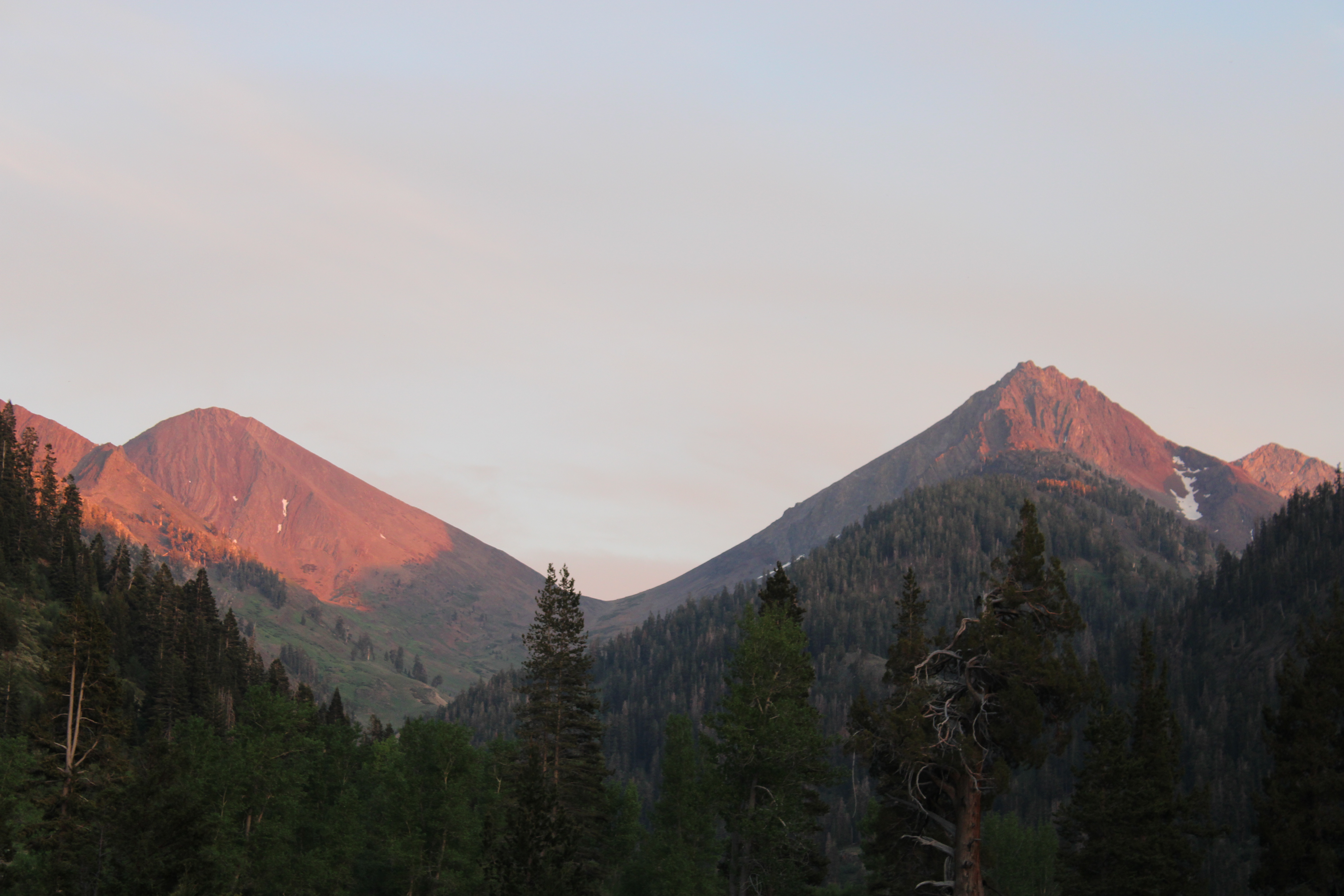
- A sunset on Farewell Gap. The gap is the low point between Vandever Mountain (right) and Little Florence Peak (left). (June 21st, 2021)
- Interactive map of Farewell Gap
- Elevation: 10,640 ft (3,240 m)

Third Approach
- Range: Sierra Nevada (California)

Farewell Gap is a high mountain pass at the head of the Mineral King valley in Sequoia National Park in the US state of California. The elevation of the gap is 10,640 feet (3,243 meters) above sea level.

== Geography ==
Farewell Gap lies along the southern boundary of Sequoia National Park in Tulare County in the state of California and the northern boundary of the Golden Trout Wilderness.

The East Fork Kaweah River has its true source on Farewell Gap, and flows northward into the Mineral King valley.

The Franklin Lakes - Farewell Gap trail provides access to the gap and is frequently used by backpackers trying to access the wilderness areas to the south, or the national park to the north.

== History ==
In 1864, a hunter named Harry O'Farrell employed by the company in charge of building the Hockett Trail from Visalia, California to Bishop, California, was guided northward across Farewell Gap into the Mineral King Valley by a member of the Paiute people, who had been venturing seasonally to the region for millennia to trade and rest. O'Farrell was the first Anglo-American to enter the valley, and he would later return to hunt and prospect.

During the 1960s, the Walt Disney Company attempted to develop the Mineral King Valley into what would have been a major ski resort, to be called Disney’s Mineral King Ski Resort, with Farewell Gap proposed as one of the centerpiece ski run corridors because of its long, skiable slope and excellent snow coverage. The entire valley is considered an exceptional locale for backcountry skiing.

In 1970, a Grumman E-1 Tracer flown by Lieutenant Robert E. Fox, belonging to the United States Navy out of Naval Air Station North Island in San Diego, California crashed on Farewell Gap, killing all four crewman onboard. The wreckage was cleaned up by the authorities but fragments of the aircraft were collected by hikers.

The gap was also the site of another plane crash in 1966, though there are fewer details.

== See also ==
- Sawtooth Peak
- Empire Mountain
- Mineral King
