= Anglo-Americans =

Demographic group in Anglo-America

Regions with significant populations
- United States: 271,528,353 (2019)
- Canada: 22,162,865 (2016)

Languages
- English

Religion
- Traditionally Protestant Christianity

Anglo-Americans are a demographic group in Anglo-America. It typically refers to the predominantly European-descent nations and ethnic groups in the Americas that speak English as a native language, making up the majority of people in the world who speak English as a first language.

== Usage ==
The term is ambiguous and used in several different ways. While it is primarily used to refer to people of English diaspora ancestry, it (along with terms like Anglo, Anglic, Anglophone, and Anglophonic) is also used to denote all people of British European ancestry.

=== In the American Southwest ===
In states such as Texas, New Mexico, Louisiana, and California; former colonies of Spain and France, Anglo-American settlers developed a cohesive identity centered around their Protestantism, English language, and British colonial heritage. Despite the overwhelming majority of Anglo settlers being American Protestants of colonial immigrant ancestry, there were also English, French-Canadian, Irish, German, Jewish, Melungeon and even Catholic settlers as well. Many Anglos married into the families of Spanish, French, and Mexican elites.

An early expression of Anglo-American nationalism occurred during the Texas Revolution, when revolutionaries created flags which included the British Union Jack, George Washington, and elements of the American flag.

== Culture ==
As the primary settlers of the 17th century American colonies were predominantly English and established the foundations of the country and formed the basis of its culture. The term implies a relationship between the United States and the United Kingdom (specifically England), or the two countries' shared language, English, and/or cultural heritage. In this context the term may refer to an English American, a person from the United States whose ancestry originates wholly or partly in England, a person from the United States who speaks English as their first language (see American English), a collective term referring to those countries that have similar legal systems based on common law, relations between the United Kingdom and United States, or Anglo-American Cataloguing Rules, a national cataloging code.

The term is also used, less frequently, to denote a connection between English people (or the English language) and the Western Hemisphere as a whole. In this context, the term can mean a person from the Americas whose ancestry originates from any English speaking country (see British diaspora) or a person from the Americas who has an English name and speaks English as their first language (see English-speaking world and Languages of the Americas), or a person from Anglo-America.

== Adjective ==
The adjective Anglo-American is used in the following ways:

- to denote the cultural sphere shared by the United Kingdom, the United States and English Canada. For example, "Anglo-American culture is different from French culture." Political leaders including Winston Churchill, Franklin D. Roosevelt and Ronald Reagan have used the term to discuss the "Special Relationship" between Britain and America.
- to describe relations between Britain and the United States. For example, "Anglo-American relations became more relaxed after the War of 1812."

== See also ==
- Anglosphere
- English-speaking world
- British Americans
- English Americans
- British Canadians
- English Canadians
- White Anglo-Saxon Protestants
