= Anglian =

Anglian may refer to:

- Anglian, meaning "of the Angles", a Germanic people who settled in Britain in the post-Roman period
- Anglian, a group of dialects of Old English
- Anglian automobile, an English tricar manufactured from 1905 to 1907
- Anglian Combination, an English football league in Norfolk and northern Suffolk
- Anglian Home Improvements, a British home improvement company
- Anglian Sovereign, a 2003 large sea-going tugboat
- Anglian stage, the name used in the British Isles for a middle Pleistocene glaciation
- Anglian Tower, an Early Medieval tower on the city walls of York, England
- Anglian Water, a water company that operates in the East of England
- East Anglia, an area in the East of England
- Royal Anglian Regiment, an infantry regiment of the British Army

== See also ==
- Anglicanism, a tradition within Christianity
- Anglic (disambiguation)
