= Florence Peak (California) =

Mountain in the American state of California

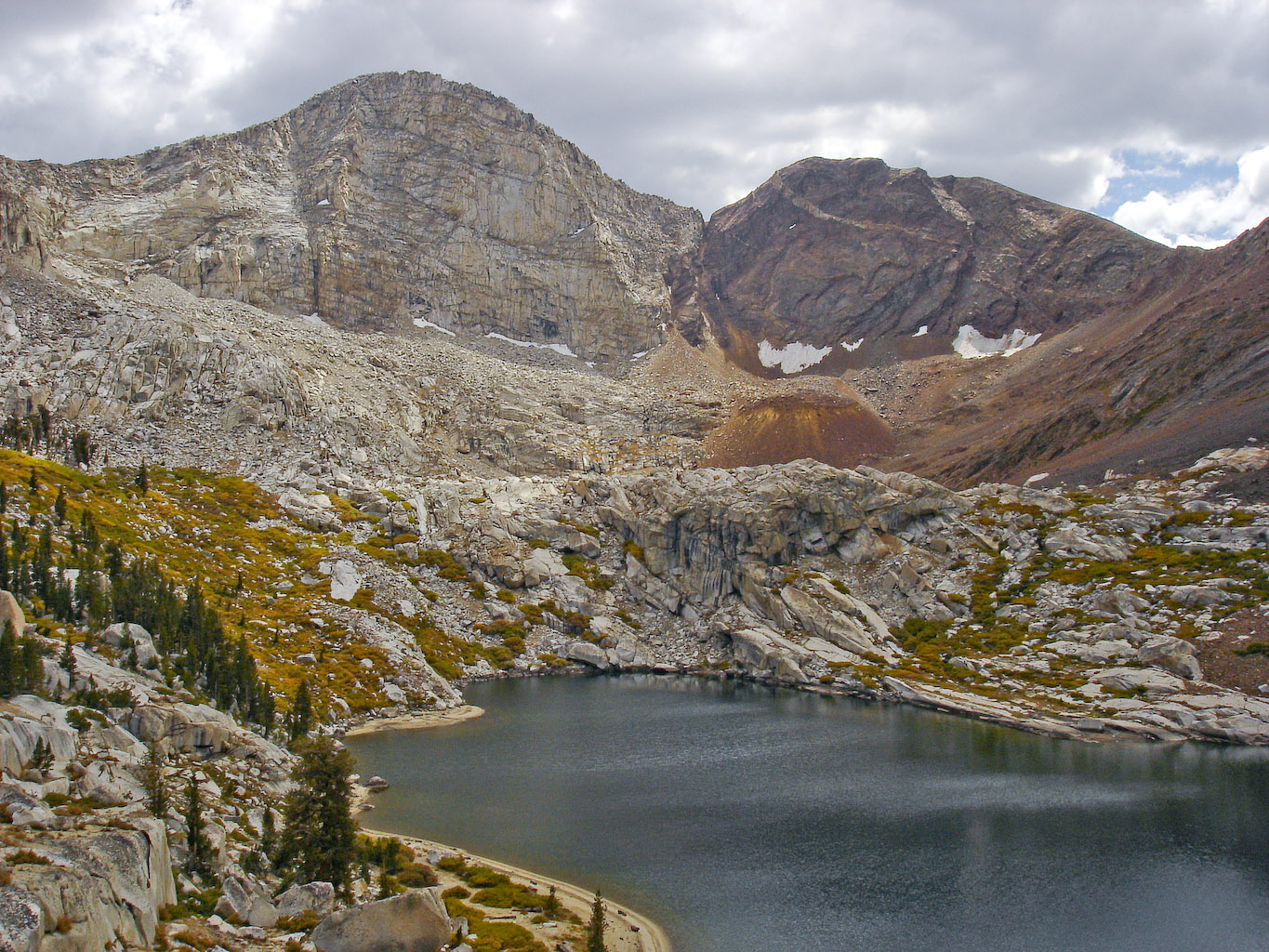
- Florence Peak and Franklin Lake

Highest point
- Elevation: 12,437 ft (3,791 m) NAVD 88
- Prominence: 1,033 ft (315 m)
- Listing: Sierra Peaks Section; Western States Climbers Emblem peak
- Coordinates: 36°24′22″N 118°33′03″W

Geography
- Location within California
- Location: Tulare County, California, U.S.
- Parent range: Sierra Nevada
- Topo map: USGS Mineral King

Climbing
- Easiest route: Simple scramble, class 2

Florence Peak is a mountain located on the Great Western Divide, a sub-range of the southern Sierra Nevada of California. It is located about 6 miles (9.7 km) southeast of the community of Silver City and 4.5 miles (7.2 km) from the roads end at Mineral King. It marks the southern boundary of Sequoia National Park. On the summit the Sequoia-Kings Canyon Wilderness, the John Krebs Wilderness and Golden Trout Wilderness meet.

== Geography ==
The peak rises to an elevation of 12,438 feet (3,791 m), making it one of the highest mountains south of Mount Whitney. The Franklin Lakes, a series of tarns, lie in a cirque on north side of the peak and these drain into the Kaweah River by way of Franklin Creek. The eastern slopes drain into the Kern River. The southwestern flank drains into the 10,000-foot (3,048 m) Bullfrog Lakes and thence into the Little Kern River.

The high elevation of the peak means that most of the precipitation it receives falls as snow.
