= Cabin Cove, California =

Unincorporated community in California, United States

Coordinates: 36°27′56″N 118°39′14″W

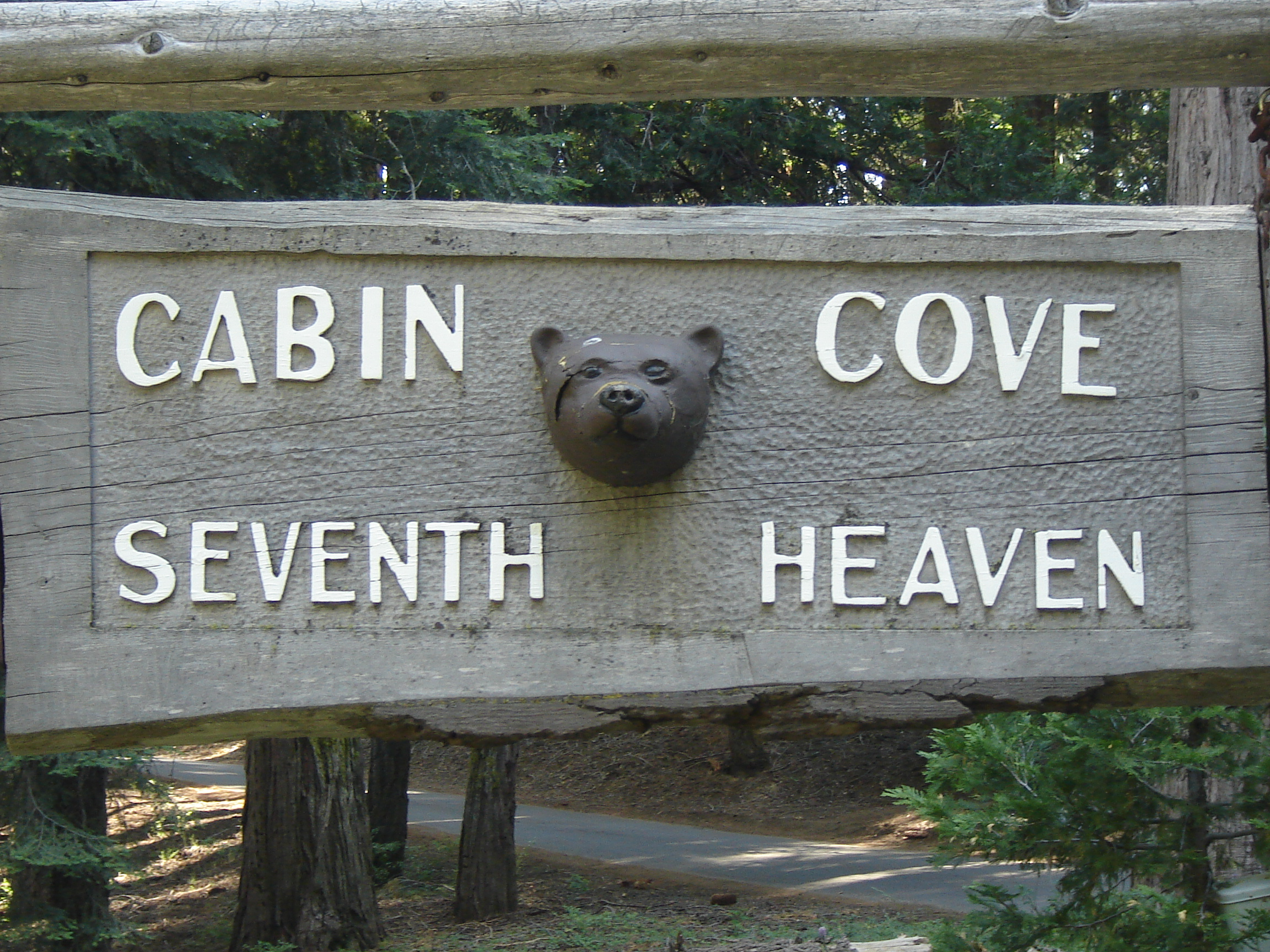
Entrance sign for Cabin Cove, on the Mineral King Road.

Cabin Cove, California is a small and historic community located in the Sierra Nevada and Sequoia National Forest, within Tulare County, California.

== Geography ==
Sequoia National Park surrounds the summer cabins in Cabin Cove. It is on the Mineral King Road, about 20 miles east of the town of Three Rivers, and about 5 miles west of Mineral King.

Cabin Cove is accessible via the Mineral King Road usually between the months of May and November, when the road is not obstructed by snow.
