= Cliff Creek =

Creek in Sierra Nevada mountains

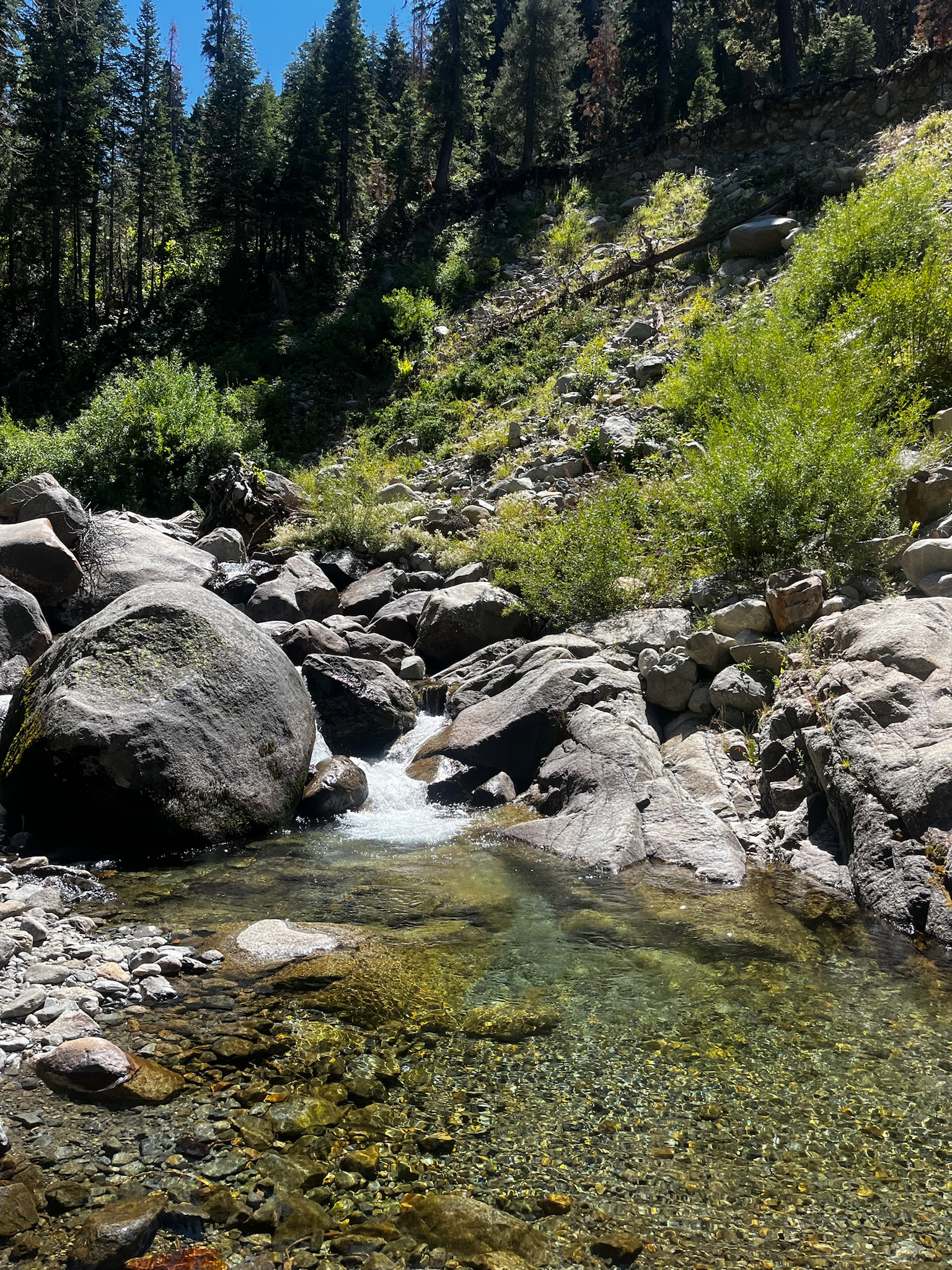
- A deep pool in Cliff Creek near its confluence with Timber Gap Creek. Cliff Creek has a large population of resident Rainbow Trout (September 1st, 2025)

Location
- Country: United States
- State: California
- County: Tulare County

Physical characteristics
- Source: Columbine Lake
  - location: Sequoia National Park
  - coordinates: 36°27′51″N 118°33′03″W
- Mouth
  - coordinates: 36°32′2″N 118°39′22″W
- Length: 8.5 m (28 ft)

Basin features
- Progression: Columbine Lake → Middle Fork Kaweah River → Kaweah River → Tulare Lake
- River system: Kaweah River
- Tributaries
  - left: Timber Gap Creek

Cliff Creek is an 8.5-mile (13.7 km) long creek in Tulare County, California in Sequoia National Park. It is a major tributary of the Middle Fork Kaweah River and has its source high in the Sierra Nevada mountain range.

== Course ==
It begins high in the Sierra Nevada mountain range at an elevation of 10,944 feet (3336 m) at Columbine lake on the eastern side of Sawtooth mountain. It descends to Cyclamen lake via a cataract and from there travels over another waterfall into nearby Spring lake. After exiting Spring lake, Cliff Creek begins its steep descent southwestward to its confluence with the Middle Fork Kaweah river, over 6,000 feet below. Pinto Lake, a small pond in a large meadow, feeds Cliff Creek in the upper part of its canyon.

Its course is defined by wet meadows, large waterfalls and subalpine conifer forests.

In most years, Cliff Creek is a swift and deep stream that can be treacherous to backpackers without proper precautions.

== Geography ==
Cliff Creek is entirely contained within Sequoia National Park. It is paralleled by backpacking trails between the Middle Fork canyon and the divide between the Kern and Kaweah rivers at Blackrock Pass, as well as the nearby Mineral King valley.

There are a number of backpacking campsites of various qualities along Cliff Creek.

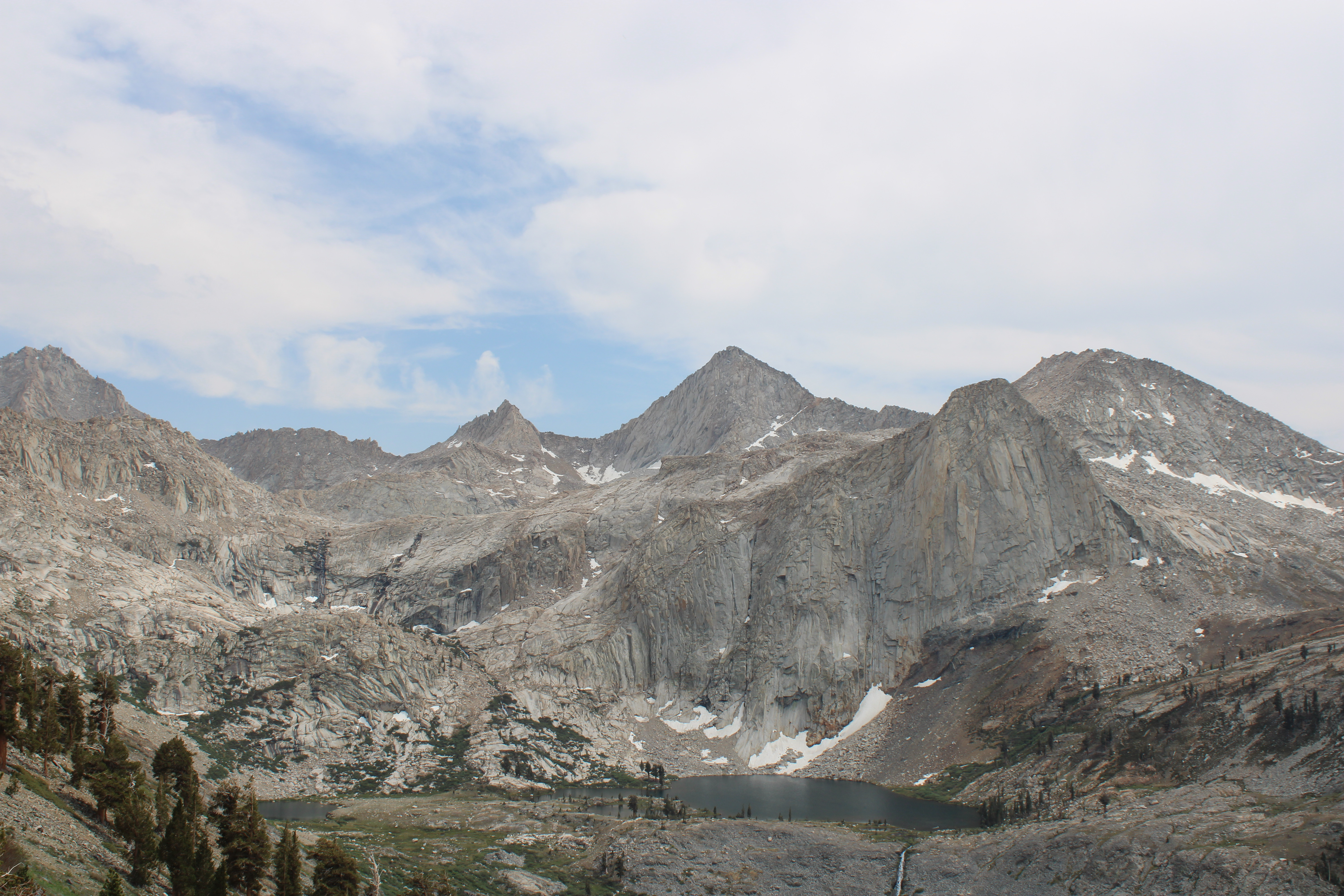
Spring Lake sits among jagged formations of Sierra Nevada granite with Sawtooth Peak rising in the background. Facing southwest (June 17th, 2021)

== Ecology ==
Cliff Creek flows through a number of different ecosystems on its 7,000-foot descent through the Sierra Nevada. Starting in a barren alpine lake, it descends through the subalpine and montane zones, eventually joining with the Kaweah river in a montane California woodlands biome, with Interior live oak, Canyon live oak and Jeffrey pine making up the dominant vegetation .

== See also ==
- Mineral King
- Kaweah River
- Sierra Nevada
- Ecology of the Sierra Nevada
- Kings Canyon National Park
