= Benchley, Texas =

Benchley
- Unincorporated community
- Location of Benchley in Texas Location within the United States
- Coordinates: 30°44′55″N 96°27′31″W
- Country: United States
- State: Texas
- County: Brazos
- Settled: 1829-1834
- Named for: Henry Benchley
- Elevation: 328 ft (100 m)

Population (2000)
  - Total: 100
- Postal code: 77807
- GNIS feature ID: 1351871

Benchley is a small unincorporated community in Brazos and Robertson counties, Texas, United States, with a population of approximately 100. The community is named after the first freight conductor of the Houston and Texas Central Railway, Henry Benchley. It was settled between 1829 and 1834 by Irish immigrants, originally named Stagger's Point.

== History ==
Many of Benchley's residents left because of the runaway scrape, which occurred between September 1835 and April 1836.

Around the 1840s, a band of criminals posed as preachers, and while one gave a sermon, the others attempted to make off with several horses. Residents went after them, and some of the thieves were killed. The residents were then able to get back their horses.

Throughout its history, the community has never had more than just a few businesses or public locations.

== Government services ==
Benchley lies within the boundaries of the Bryan ISD, and Brazos County Pct. 4 Fire Department in Brazos County, and Blackjack Volunteer Fire Department in Robertson County. Benchley is served by the Bryan post office with the Bryan, TX zip code 77807.
