= Stagger's Point, Texas =

Stagger's Point was an Irish-American colony founded in 1833 in Mexican Texas.

The first settlers were a part of a large group of Ulster Protestant immigrants who had settled initially in South Carolina in 1821 before the establishment of Stagger's Point.

Many Irish from the town fought in the Texas Revolution against the Mexican military.

The town is now known as Benchley, Texas.

== See also ==
- Robertson's Colony
- Scotch-Irish Americans
- American immigration to Mexico
