= Anglic =

Anglic may refer to:

- Something related to the Angles
- Old English language
- Other Anglic languages descended from Old English
- A simplified system of English spelling invented by Swedish philologist Robert Eugen Zachrisson in 1930

== See also ==
- Angelic (disambiguation)
- Anglian (disambiguation)
