= Anglian automobile =

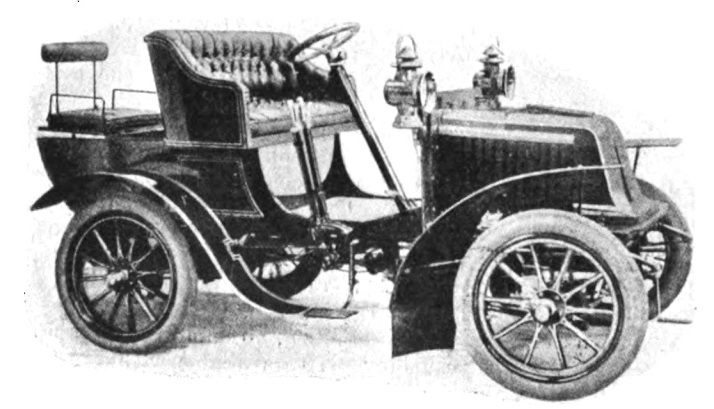
Anglian automobile

The Anglian was an English car manufactured in Beccles, Suffolk from 1905 to 1907. The automobiles featured either a 3½ hp single-cylinder De Dion engine or 5 hp "twin coupled" power units. It appears the company mainly made tricars, but a photo of a 1909 four-wheeled Anglian car, the first car to be used by East Suffolk Police, indicates they did not just make tricars.
