= Silver City, California =

Silver City
- Unincorporated
- Location in Tulare County and the state of California

- Position in California.
- Coordinates: 36°27′50″N 118°39′03″W
- Country: United States
- State: California
- County: Tulare

Area
  - Total: 0.117 sq mi (0.302 km^{2})
  - Land: 0.117 sq mi (0.302 km^{2})
  - Water: 0 sq mi (0 km^{2}) 0%
- Elevation: 6,732 ft (2,052 m)

Population (2020)
  - Total: 0
- Time zone: UTC-8 (Pacific (PST))
  - Summer (DST): UTC-7 (PDT)
- GNIS feature ID: 2585449

Silver City is a census-designated place (CDP) in the mountainous area of central Tulare County, California, United States. Silver City sits at an elevation of 6,732 feet (2,052 m). It lies 72 km east-northeast of Visalia, within the boundary of Sequoia National Park. The 2010 and 2020 United States censuses reported that Silver City was uninhabited.

Silver City is the name of an inholding in Sequoia National Park located at Mile 21 on the 25-mile road to Mineral King. It consists of 58 fee-simple lots, 39 of which have cabins on them, plus a commercial area consisting of a store, restaurant and several rental cabins called the Silver City Mountain Resort. It is classified as a transient non-community because it is occupied only during the spring, summer and fall but not during the winter.

== Geography ==
According to the United States Census Bureau, the CDP covers an area of 0.1 square mile (0.3 km^{2}), all land.

== History ==
Archaeological evidence indicates that the area surrounding Silver City has supported indigenous peoples for thousands of years. A Yokuts tribe called Wukchumni established permanent campsites along the Kaweah River in the lower elevations below Silver City. During the hot summers, these people moved to the higher elevations, thus becoming the first users of the Silver City area. They traded with the Monache and the Numic peoples who came over the Sierras from the eastern side in hunting and foraging movements.

The first settler of the modern historical era homesteaded Silver City in 1856; Hale Tharp. In 1858 Tharp’s brother-in-law, John Swanson, erected a dwelling there. For several subsequent years, valley ranchers used the alpine areas during the summer heat, allowing their cattle to graze there.

By 1873, sufficient metal ore had been identified in the nearby mountains to cause a minor gold rush. Although short-lived, it consolidated Mineral King and Silver City into viable summertime communities.

== Demographics ==
Historical population
Census	Pop.	Note	%±
2010	0		—
2020	0		—
U.S. Decennial Census; 1850–1870 1880-1890; 1900 1910 1920; 1930 1940 1950; 1960 1970 1980; 1990 2000 2010

Silver City first appeared as a census designated place in the 2010 U.S. census.

== Education ==
Silver City is served by the Three Rivers Union Elementary School District and the Woodlake Unified School District for grades 9-12.
