= Sawtooth Peak =

Mountain in Sequoia National Park

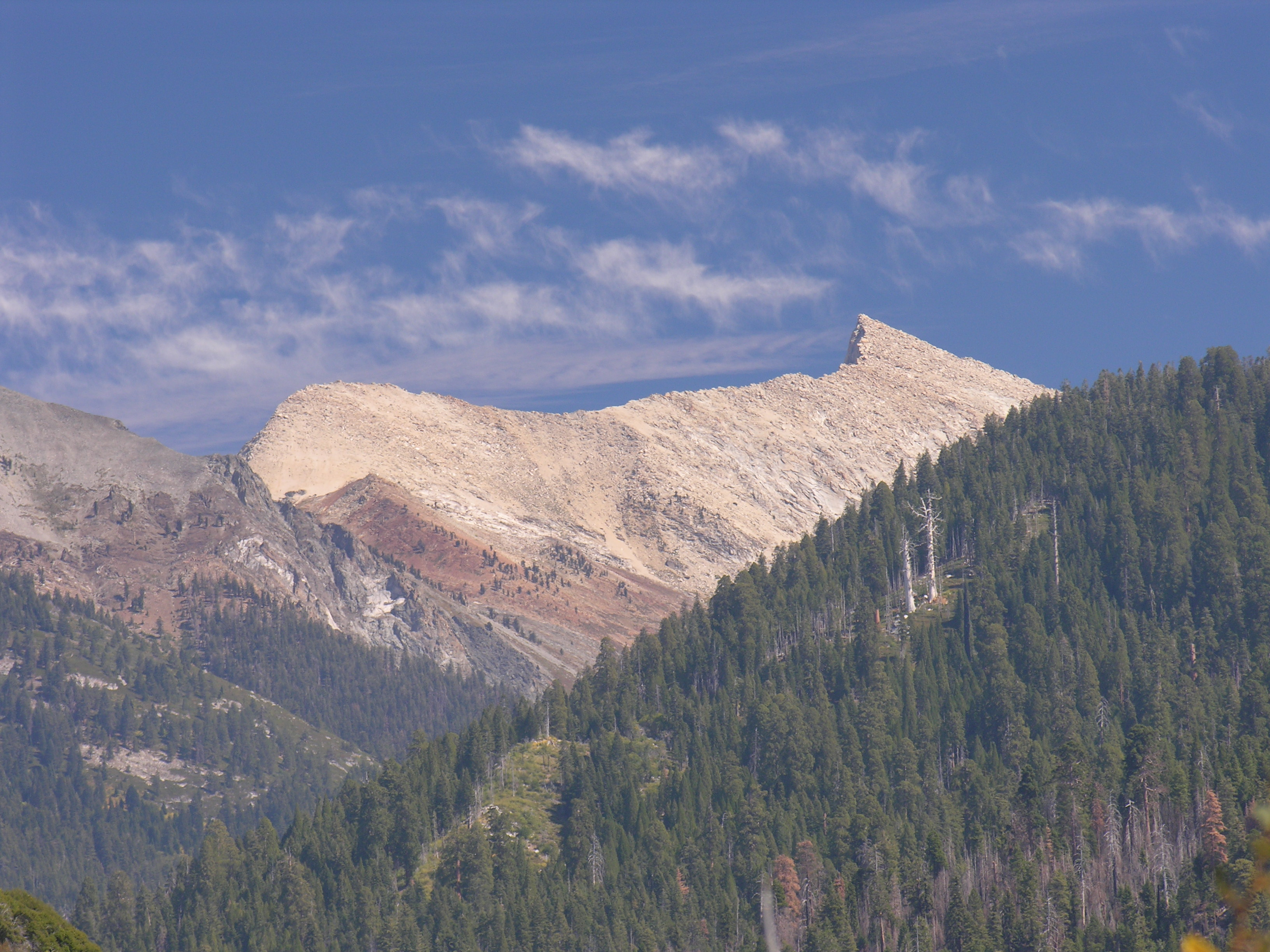
- Sawtooth Peak's west face over the Mineral King Valley, September 2005

Highest point
- Elevation: 12,348 ft (3,764 m) NAVD 88
- Prominence: 663 ft (202 m)
- Parent peak: Needham Mountain
- Listing: Sierra Peaks Section
- Coordinates: 36°27′19″N 118°33′18″W

Geography
- Location within California Location within the United States
- Location: Sequoia National Park; Tulare County, California, U.S.
- Topo map: USGS Mineral King

Geology
- Rock age: Cretaceous
- Mountain type: Fault block
- Rock type: Granodiorite

Climbing
- First ascent: 1871 Joseph Lovelace
- Easiest route: Scramble, class 2

Sawtooth Peak is a mountain rising to a height of 12,343 feet (3,762 m). It is a landmark of the Mineral King region of the Sierra Nevada, in Sequoia National Park. In the past, it was known as Miner's Peak. It contains a supply of gold and mercury.

== Hiking ==
The trailhead up to Sawtooth Peak starts in Mineral King, 23 miles (37 km) off of California State Route 198 on Mineral King Road. The trailhead is located at the end of Mineral King Road in a parking lot/staging area. The trail up to the peak is 11.5 miles (18.5 km) round trip and is rated difficult. The last half-mile of the trail is mainly loose gravel and steep switchbacks. The base of the trail is at 7,800 feet (2,400 m) elevation and climbs up to some 11,000 feet (3,400 m) at the top of Sawtooth Pass; the summit of the peak is at 12,343 feet (3,762 m). Hiking is recommended from May to October. Permits are required for overnight stays.

== Climbing ==
The easiest approach is from the valley to Sawtooth Pass, and then up the northwest slope of the peak. It was first climbed by Joseph Lovelace during a deer hunt in 1871.

Today, this approach follows an established trail to Sawtooth Pass, then continues on a cross-country route to the peak. The section of trail from Monarch Lakes to Sawtooth Pass is steep and marred by granite sand, and as such is prone to erosion. The trailhead, shared with the Timber Gap trail, is located in the Mineral King Valley, about 1/2 mile (0.80 km) uphill from the Ranger Station. It starts at 7,500 feet (2,300 m), is approximately 7 miles (10 km) round trip, and the route reaches a final elevation of 12,343 feet (3,762 m) at the peak.

== Climate ==
According to the Köppen climate classification system, Sawtooth Peak is located in an alpine climate zone. Most weather fronts originate in the Pacific Ocean, and travel east toward the Sierra Nevada mountains. As fronts approach, they are forced upward by the peaks (orographic lift), causing them to drop their moisture in the form of rain or snowfall onto the range.

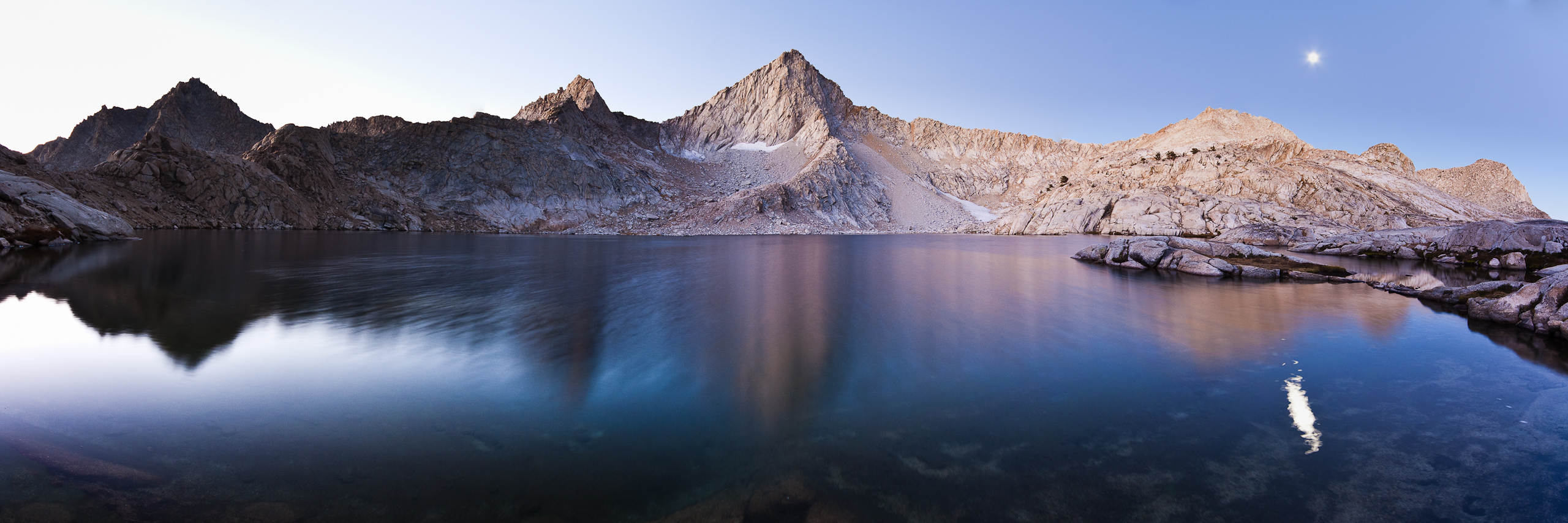
Sawtooth Peak and Columbine Lake
