= East Fork Kaweah River =

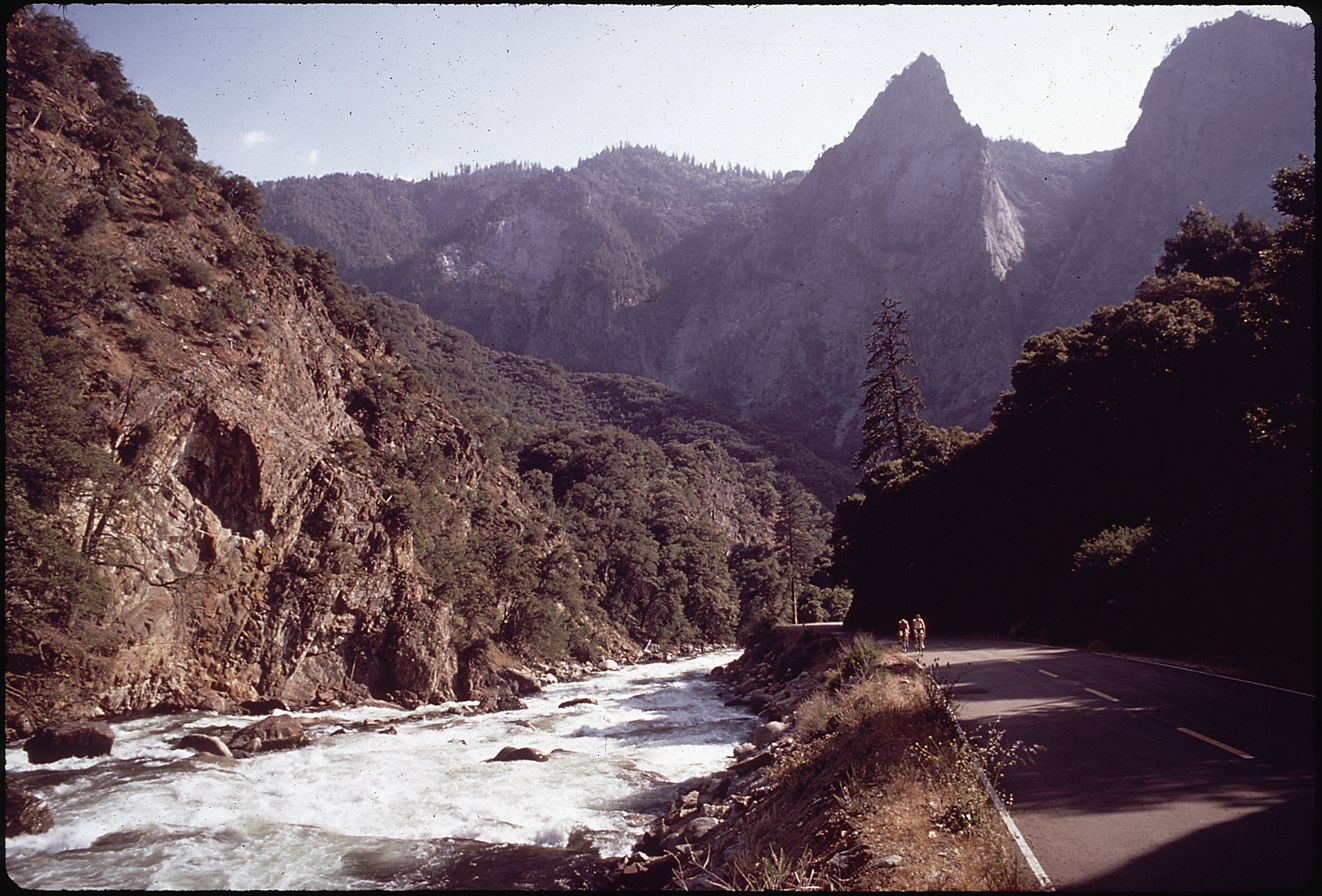
- East Fork Kaweah River and Mineral King Road

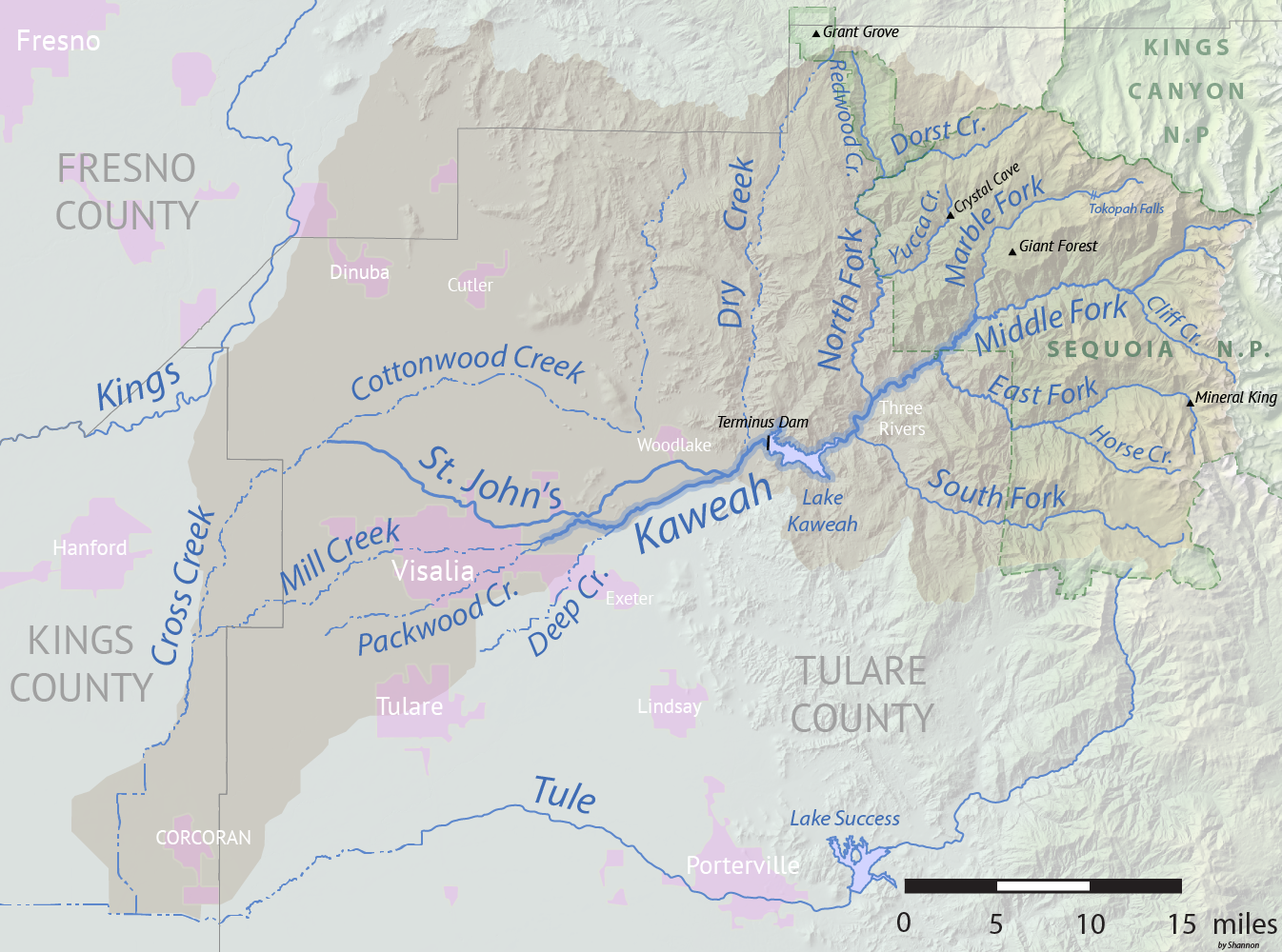
- Map of the Kaweah River drainage basin

Location
- Country: United States
- State: California

Physical characteristics
- Source: Mineral King
  - location: Sequoia National Park
  - coordinates: 36°24′05″N 118°35′28″W
  - elevation: 10,029 ft (3,057 m)
- Mouth: Kaweah River
  - location: Three Rivers
  - coordinates: 36°28′45″N 118°50′18″W
  - elevation: 1,283 ft (391 m)
- Length: 22.5 mi (36.2 km)
- Basin size: 95.3 sq mi (247 km^{2})

The East Fork Kaweah River is a 22.5-mile (36.2 km) tributary of the Kaweah River in Tulare County, California. The river begins below Farewell Gap at the head of the Mineral King Valley in Sequoia National Park.

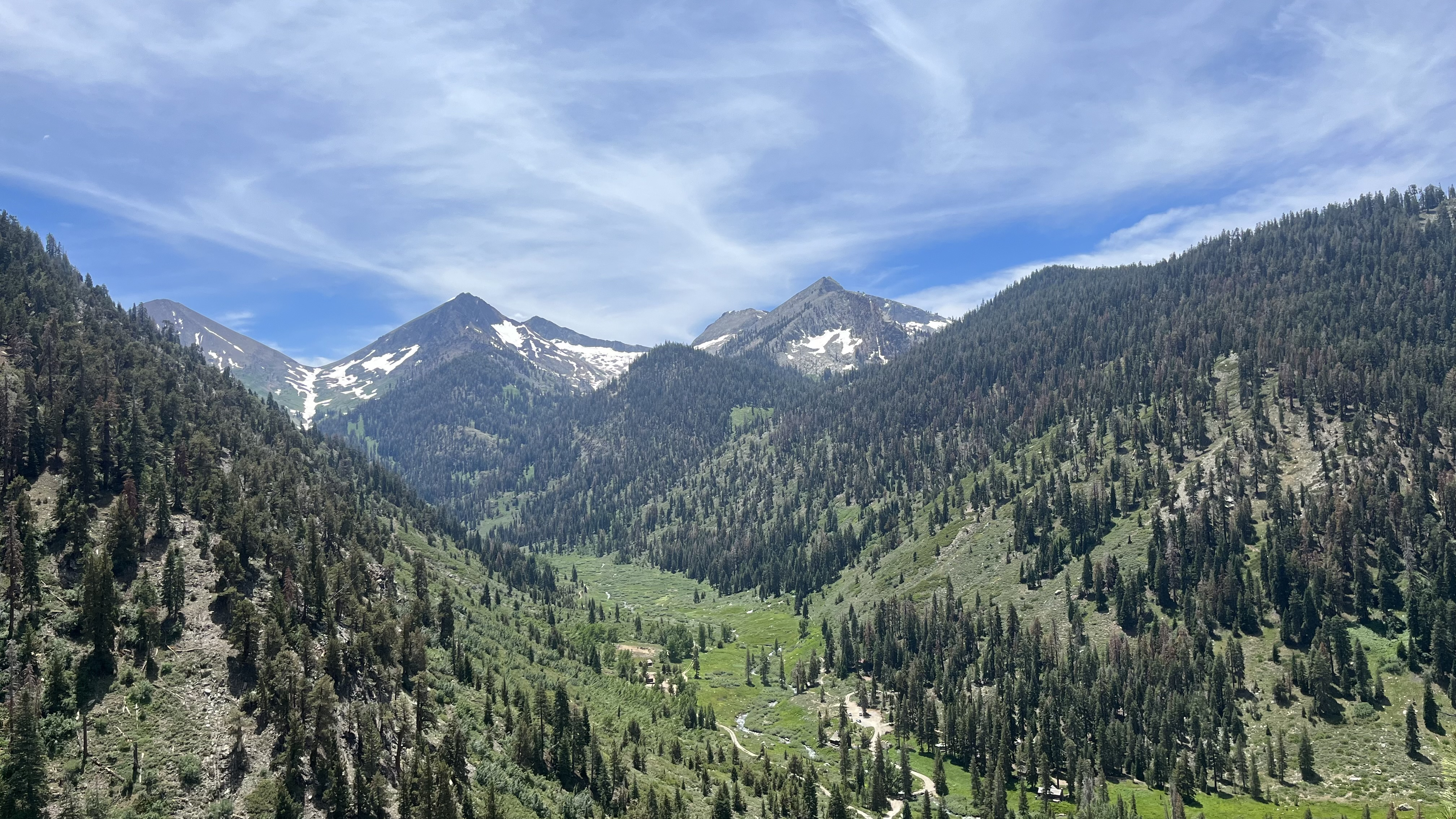
The East Fork of the Kaweah has its source at the prominent high elevation gap at the head of the Mineral King Valley, Farewell Gap. The upper East Fork Kaweah can be seen flowing through willow thickets and meadows in its course through the upper Mineral King Valley.

It flows north through mountain meadows then turns west through a steep canyon, where it forms a waterfall about 200 feet (61 m) high known alternately as "Mineral King Falls" or "Three-Falls-Below-The-Gate". It then receives its largest tributary, Horse Creek, from the left before leaving the national park and turning northwest. It joins the Kaweah River about 2 miles (3.2 km) upstream of Three Rivers.

The narrow, winding one-lane Mineral King Road runs along the East Fork canyon, providing the only vehicular access to Mineral King.

== See also ==
- List of rivers of California
