= Mineral King =

Subalpine valley in the U.S. state of California

Mineral King Valley
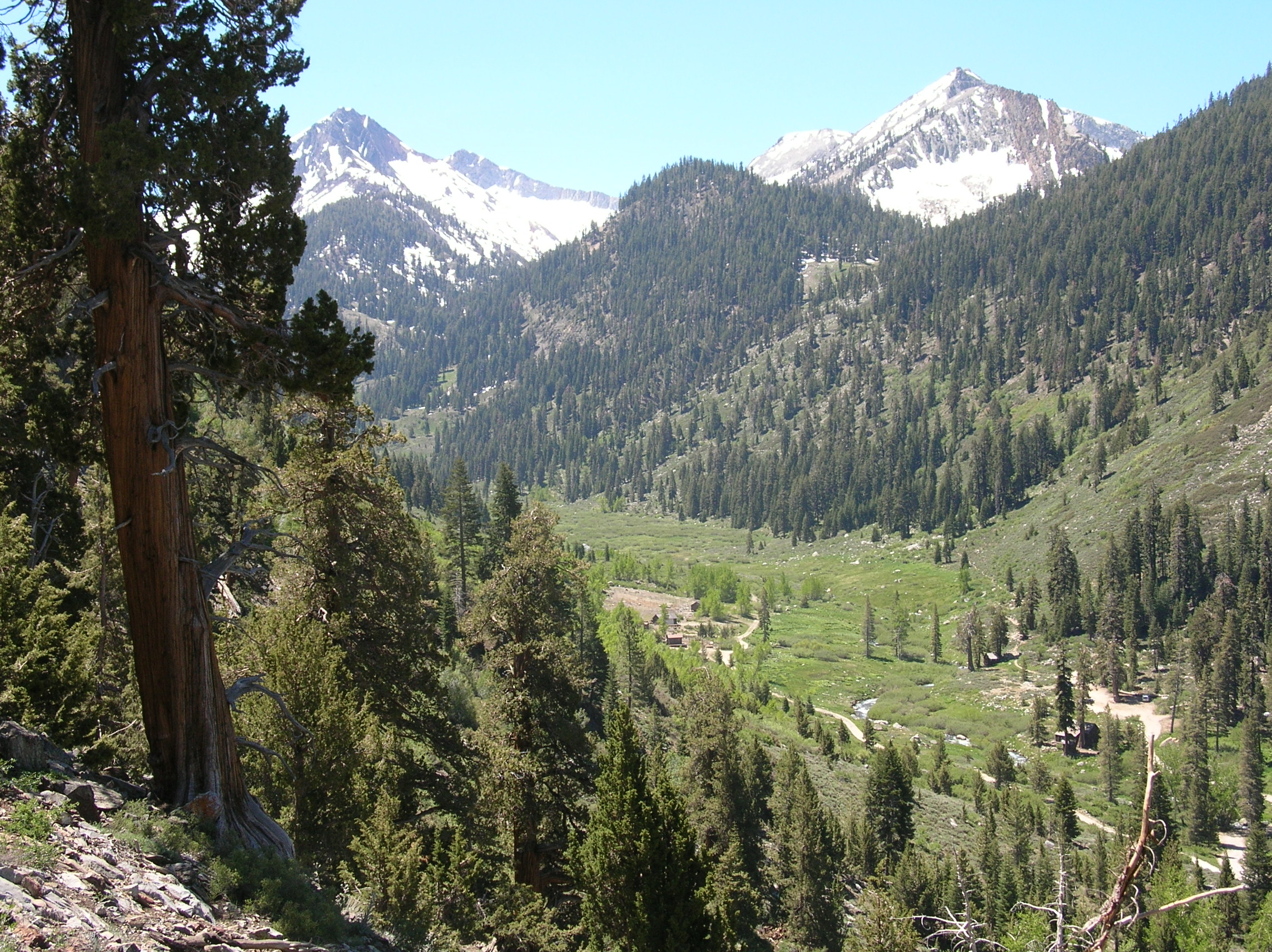
- Length: 7 miles (11 km)
- Width: 1 mile (2 km)

Geography
- Location: Sequoia National Park, Sierra Nevada, Tulare County, California, North of Porterville,
- Coordinates: 36.2703°N 118.3541°W
- Mineral King Road Cultural Landscape
- U.S. National Register of Historic Places
- U.S. Historic district
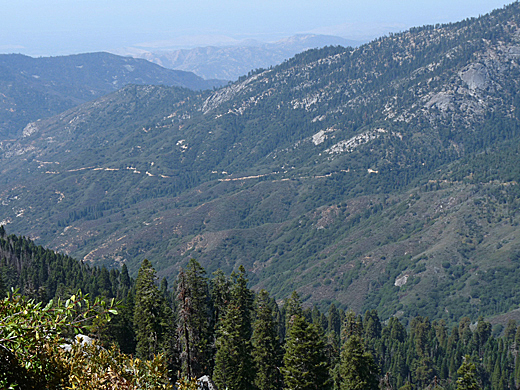

- Location within California Location within the United States
- Location: Mineral King Rd, Sequoia National Park
- Coordinates: 36°27′11″N 118°35′56″W
- Area: 408 acres (165.1 ha)
- Built: 1915
- Built by: U.S. Forest Service, National Park Service, Civilian Conservation Corps
- Architectural style: NPS rustic
- NRHP reference No.: 03001063
- Added to NRHP: October 24, 2003
- Interactive map of Mineral King Valley

Mineral King is a subalpine glacial valley located in the southern part of Sequoia National Park, in the U.S. state of California. The valley lies at the headwaters of the East Fork of the Kaweah River, which rises at the eastern part of the valley and flows northwest. Accessed by a long and narrow winding road, the valley is mostly popular with backpackers and hikers.

Historically, the valley was inhabited by the Yokuts tribe during the summer months. They would come up to escape the high heat of the Central Valley and to hunt and forage. They would also meet with bands coming over from the eastern side of the Sierra to trade. In the 1870s, silver was discovered on the slopes of a mountain overlooking Mineral King. Mineral King Road was built in 1873 and was gradually improved throughout the early 20th century.

On September 19, 1966, Walt Disney Productions announced plans to build a ski resort called "Disney's Mineral King Ski Resort" in the valley. The project was canceled after lengthy opposition by preservationists, including the Sierra Club. In 1978, the valley became part of Sequoia National Park.

The name Mineral King also refers to the historic mining camps and towns in and near the valley, including Silver City and Cabin Cove. The settlements as a whole are referred to as the Mineral King Road Cultural Landscape, which was added to the National Register of Historic Places in 2003.

== Geography ==
Mineral King is a 7.5-mile-long (12.1 km), 1-mile-wide (1.6 km) glacial valley in the southern Sierra Nevada. The valley floor lies at an elevation of 7,400 feet (2,300 m), while the granite peaks rising above the head of the valley reach heights of 11,000 feet (3,400 m) or more. Mineral King is located about 20 miles (32 km) southeast of Three Rivers, which is near the confluence of the East Fork Kaweah River and Middle Fork Kaweah River.

The valley floor is an expanse of open meadows with a narrow strip of riparian vegetation, including short trees and bushes, along the East Fork Kaweah River. As the flat meadows give way to rocky slopes, there are many congregations of conifers that climb the slopes to the tree line. Above the tree line, there are sheer or almost sheer granite walls that slope up to form Sawtooth Peak, Empire Mountain, Mineral Peak, Hengst Peak, and others. There are two prominent mountain passes leading out of Mineral King: Timber Gap, which leads into the Middle Fork Kaweah River drainage, and Farewell Gap at the valley head, which leads into the Kern River drainage. The first half of the valley runs from south to north and the second half runs from east to west.

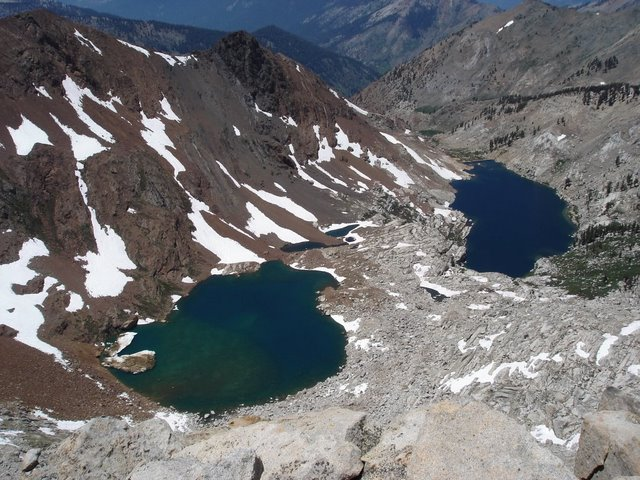
The Franklin Lakes lie at the headwaters of Mineral King and feed Franklin Falls.

Fed by snowmelt, springs, and abundant lakes in granite bowls at the upstream end of the valley, creeks plunge down the steep valley walls as long and twisting waterfalls. These include Tufa Falls, Crystal Creek Falls, and Franklin Falls, in upstream order. This section of the valley is dotted with tributary gorges that fan out from the main canyon. Lakes in this section of the valley include the Mosquito Lakes, Eagle Lake, the Franklin Lakes, and the Crystal Lakes. From the end of the valley, the East Fork Kaweah River drops over Mineral King Falls and East Fork Falls, before continuing down a steep and narrow gorge, following Mineral King Road.

Mineral King is one of the oldest communities in the High Sierra, with many families owning cabins for six or seven generations. Many of the communities date from the 1870s silver boom and have been inhabited since.

== History ==
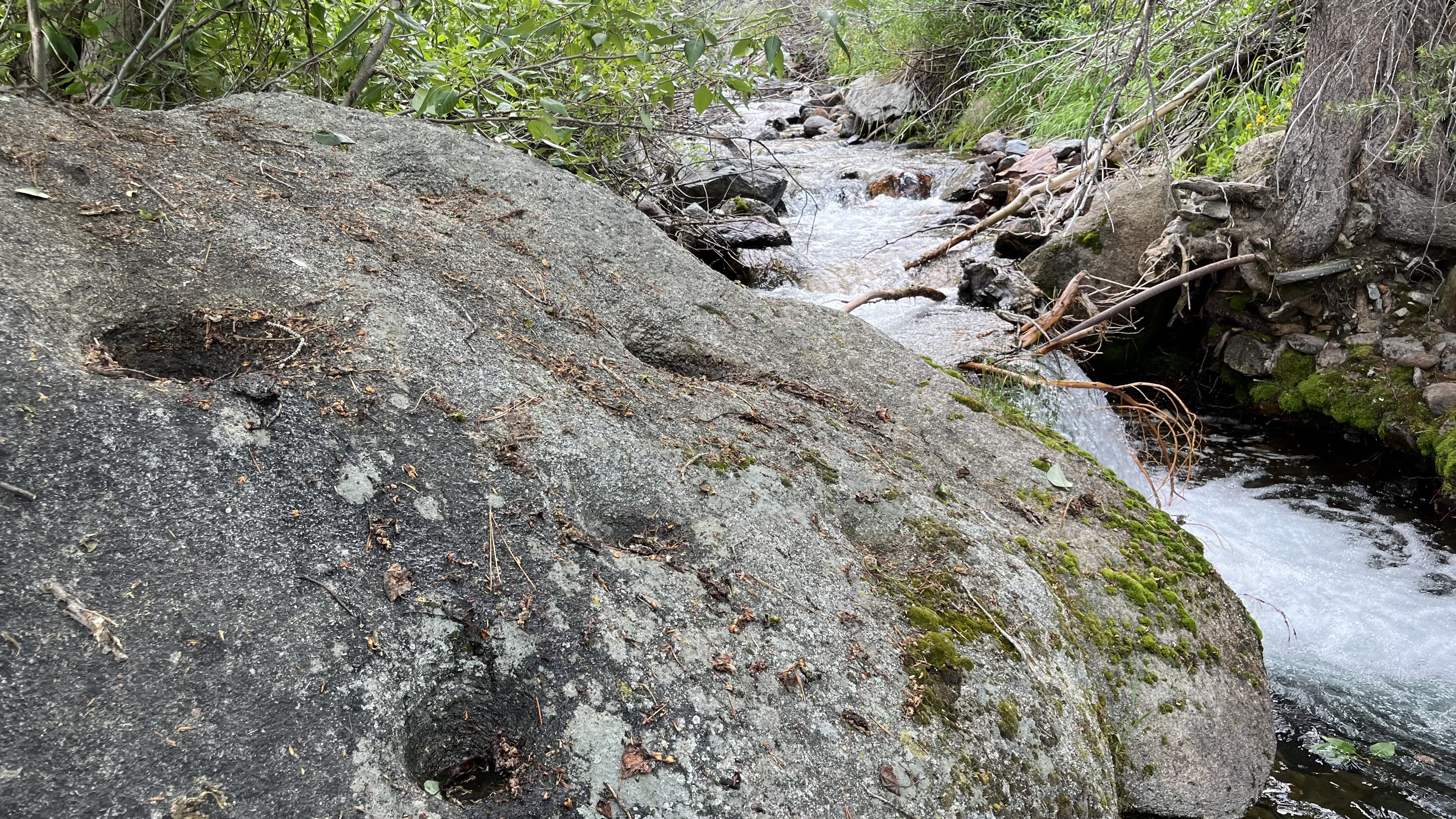
A granite boulder with bedrock mortars in the Mineral King Valley (July 14th, 2024)

Evidence suggests that Native Americans long ago used Mineral King to camp and hunt in. These Native American groups included the Wikchúmni Yokuts (or Wukchumni) and the Tübatulabal. The Yokuts actually had their main villages in the broad valley adjoining and in the present-day site of Lake Kaweah, thousands of feet lower in elevation than Mineral King in the foothill zone. They created summer settlements on the valley floor and also around the area that was later to be the site of Atwell Mill. The primary purpose of these summer settlements was hunting and trading with the Paiutes, who lived east of the Sierra Nevada and also ventured into the mountains during the summer months.

The first explorer of European descent known to have visited Mineral King was the Irishman Harry "Parole" O'Farrell, in 1862. While employed as hunters for a trail crew building the Hockett toll trail from Visalia to Independence, O'Farrell was shown the valley by a Paiute guide, approaching from the south over Farewell Gap. Attracted by the promise of mineral riches, O'Farrell returned to prospect and build a summer settlement on the prominent bend on the East Fork of the Kaweah River, which came to be called Harry's Bend.

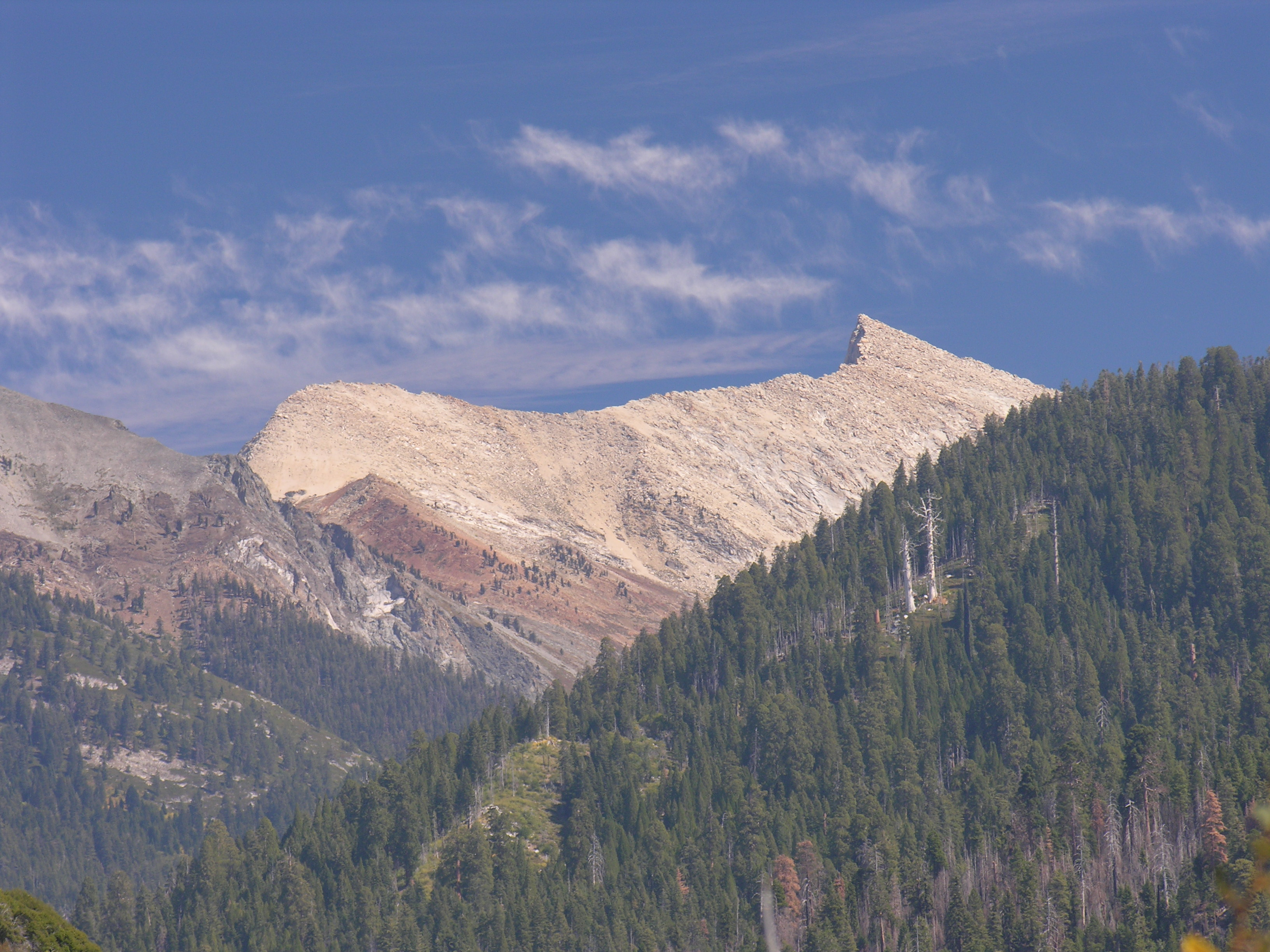
Silver was discovered near Sawtooth Peak in the 1870s.

In the 1870s and 1880s, assays of precious metals in White Chief Canyon and on Empire Mountain led to the boomtown of Beulah. The first discovery of silver in the Mineral King Valley occurred in 1872, below Mineral Peak and Empire Mountain. Following the discovery, the Mineral King Wagon and Toll Road Company was established in December 1873 to build a wagon road. The first routing of Mineral King Road followed the East Fork Canyon's south side. Until then, access to Mineral King was by rough tracks. A second discovery of silver in 1878 drew more prospectors to the Mineral King area and a second Mineral King Road, following a different route up the north side of the canyon, was constructed in 1879. This created the route for much of the present-day Mineral King Road.

The Mineral King Road passes through two groves of giant sequoias, the Redwood Creek Grove and the Atwell Grove. In 1890 the groves were included in the boundaries of the newly established Sequoia National Park, encompassing the central portion of the road. Mineral King itself was excluded from the new park. The Mineral King entrance was the most heavily used gateway to the park until 1903.

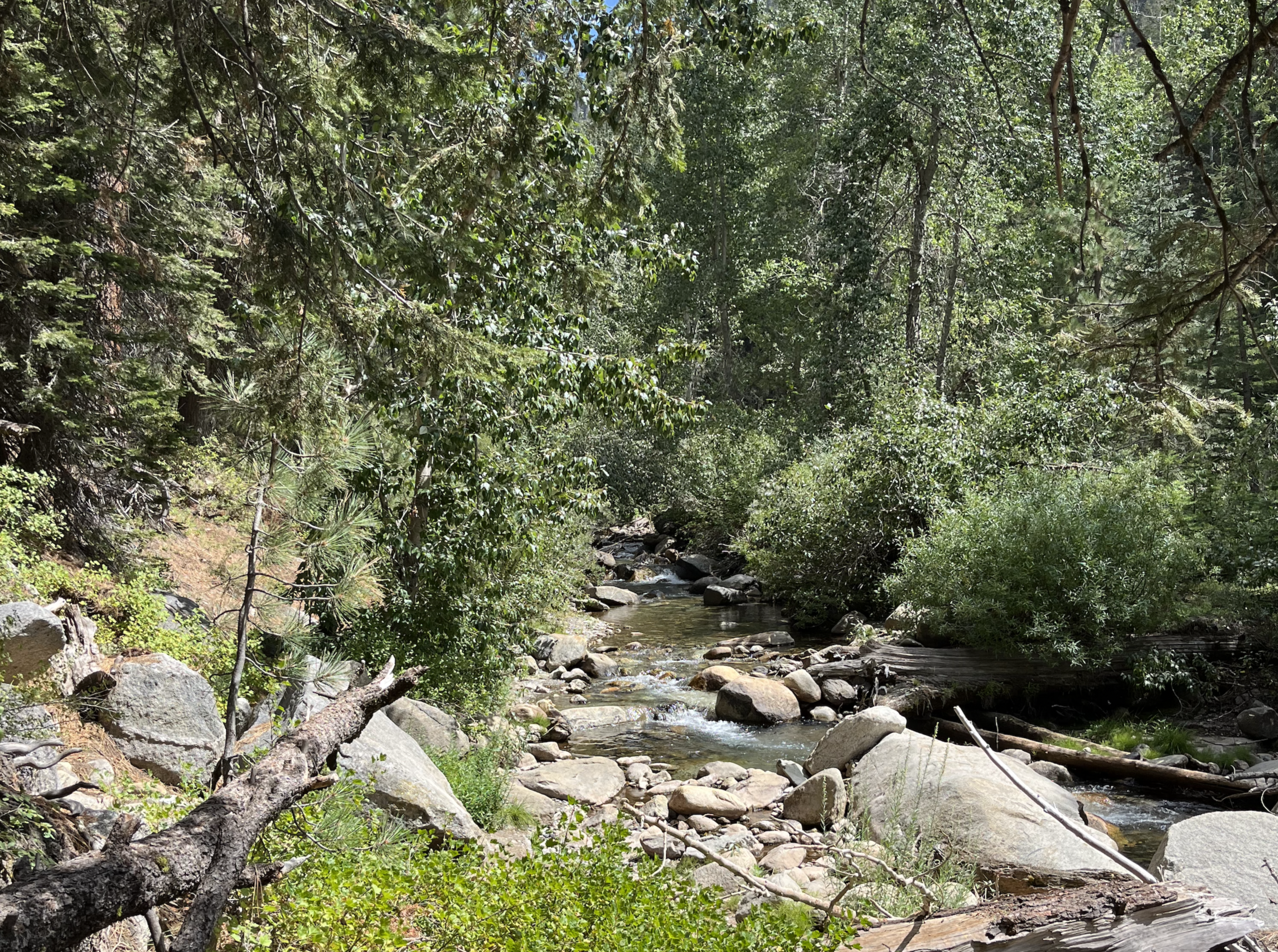
The East Fork of the Kaweah River in the Faculty Flats area of Mineral King. It is shaded by cottonwood, alder, willow and various species of pine, spruce and firs

A Tom Fowler purchased the Empire Mine, then the largest mine in the area, and created the Empire Gold and Silver Mining Company. The lowermost part of the road was rebuilt in 1915 to its present-day route. Over time, the minerals were found to be unprofitable to extract from their ore and no significant mining ever took place, but the valley kept its hopeful name: Mineral King.

By the 1920s and as part of the Sequoia National Forest, the area became a recreational center, reinforced by the destruction of most of the mining structures in landslides following the 1906 San Francisco earthquake. Mineral King was used as a summer camping area. Continuing until 1942, private cabins were built in the Mineral King area, expanding the communities of Cabin Cove, Silver City, and Beulah. (All of these communities, including Silver City, would later become part of the National Register of Historic Places' Mineral King Road Cultural Landscape.) In 1926, Mineral King was declared the Sequoia Game Refuge by the United States Congress.

=== Disney Ski Resort proposal, and addition to national park ===
Disney's Mineral King Ski Resort was a project developed by Walt Disney Productions in the 1960s. Disney had become interested in skiing around this time, and decided to build a ski resort in the Mineral King Valley. At the time, many skiers believed this to be the largest potential resort in all of California. Disney's bid won out over those of other developers, having the largest plans. Disney had also met renowned University of Denver and Olympic ski coach Willy Schaeffler, and together they developed the village and mountain resort plans.

Conversely, the Sierra Club supported the ski resort proposal during the embryonic stages of its development. Its original plans then were changed to a proposal involving the construction of 14 ski lifts, and hotels and large parking areas. The final plan called for 27 ski lifts and facilities for two million visitors per year. It was at this time that the Sierra Club announced its opposition to the project. The ski resort was never built, due to environmental concerns raised by a coalition of preservationists, led by the Sierra Club. After years of legal battles between pro-development and preservationist groups, the Mineral King Valley was annexed into Sequoia National Park in 1978 by an act of Congress. That legislation effectively stopped the plan to ever develop the area into a ski resort.

== Natural history ==
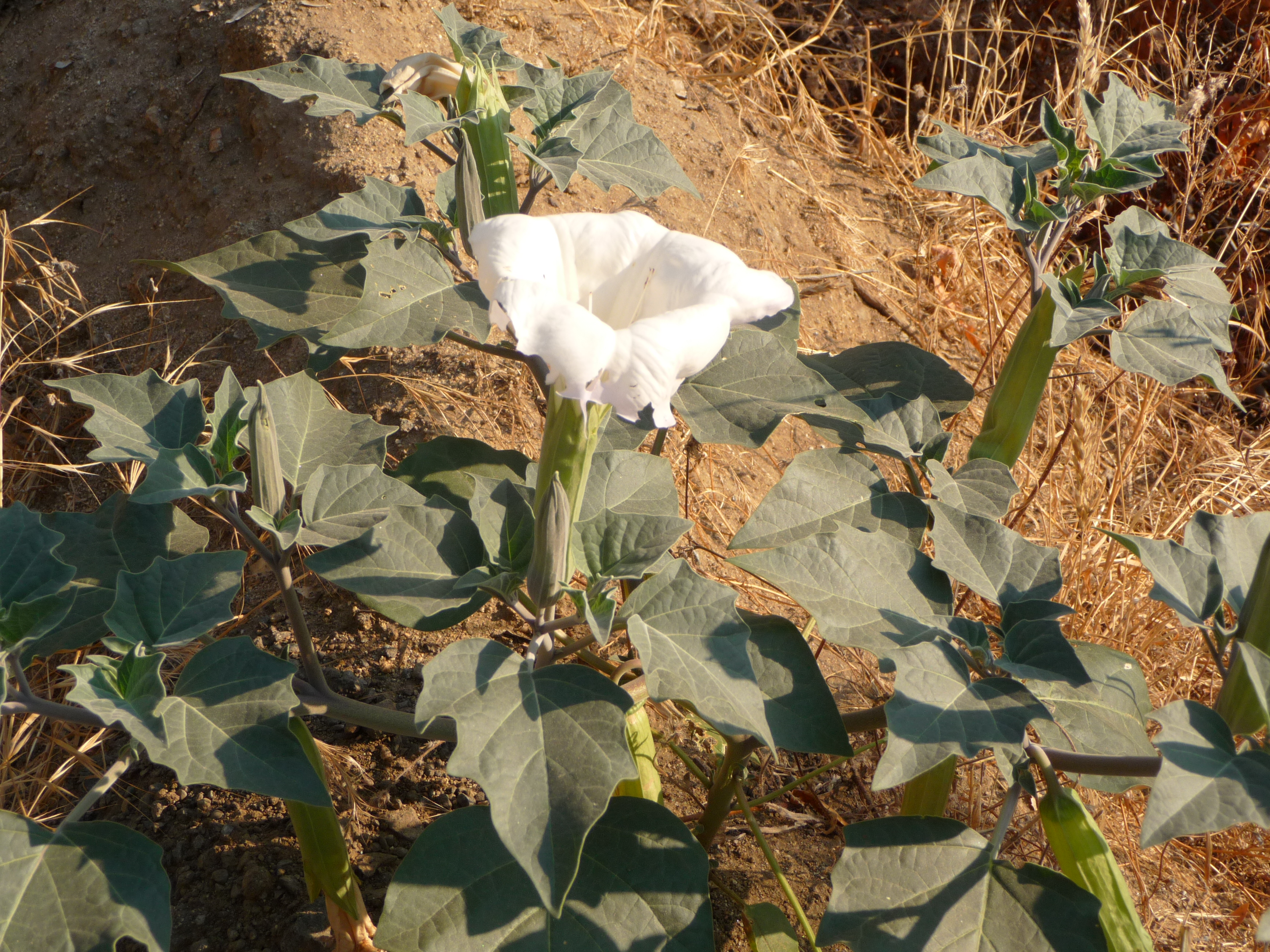
Sacred datura off Mineral King Road

Upper Mineral King remains largely in its natural state, while lower Mineral King has been somewhat developed. Wildlife is abundant in the valley, including black bears, mule deer, and yellow-bellied marmots. Mountain lions are sometimes seen as well. The East Fork of the Kaweah River which runs through the valley is a small, high-gradient stream that supports a variety of bird and insect life. Mining activities during the silver boom severely hurt the ecology of the lower East Fork below the Empire mine and White Chief Canyon, but wildlife has slowly rebounded.

== Recreation ==
The Mineral King Valley is accessed by a long, narrow, winding mountain road that leads 25 miles (40 km) generally southeast from the junction with Highway 198 near Three Rivers. At the end of the road is the Mosquito-Eagle Trailhead, which allows hikers to access trails leading out of the south end of the valley. There are also hiking trails leading north out of the valley through Timber Gap. Two Sequoia National Park campgrounds are located in Mineral King, Atwell Mill Campground and Cold Springs Campground, with a total of 61 tent campsites.

No commercial services are available in the Mineral King Valley and visitors must bring food, camping supplies, firewood and other essentials with them. None of the cabins have electricity and most use propane for lighting, cooking and fireplaces providing heat. There are a few public telephones scattered throughout the Mineral King Valley, notably at the Cold Springs Campground, a trail head parking lot and at the end of the road. Cell phones do not work in the valley due to the remote location and steep terrain. There are at least two webcams that provide year-round visibility into the Mineral King Valley.

No gasoline is available after leaving State Route 198, 25 miles down the winding Mineral King road (a 90-minute drive). The National Park Service charges fees for using campsites at Cold Springs and Atwell Mill. Bears, marmots and other wild animals abound so campers take precautions to protect their food and vehicles. Suggested precautions are posted by the Park Service at the public campgrounds. Camping is not permitted in any location along the road except in the public campgrounds.

== Preservation ==
The Mineral King road corridor was placed on the National Register of Historic Places on October 24, 2003. Several significant vacation home settlements are preserved along Mineral King Road.

One mile before reaching the Mineral King cabins is a grouping of 30 or so cabins in an area named Faculty Flat. The Faculty Flat cabins were mostly built in the 1920s and many are listed in the National Register of Historic Places. The name Faculty Flat derives from a group of Los Angeles educators that originally populated the area.

The Cabin Cove settlement comprises seven cabins, of which six are historic preserved structures. West Mineral King grew up around a place called Barton's Camp, and comprises 35 cabins, all of which are at their original locations and all of which are considered historic structures. East Mineral King, also known as the Beulah Tract, was built around the site of Crowley's Hotel. There are 24 cabins in East Mineral King.

Cabins are typically simple frame structures with board-and-batten siding and metal roofs. In addition to the cabins, the Atwell Mill ranger residence is preserved, exemplifying the National Park Service rustic style. The Lookout Point entrance station and residence were built in the Mission Revival style. A number of water troughs, sited along the road to provide water for overheated car radiators, are also historic structures.

There are two groups devoted to preserving Mineral King:

- The Mineral King District Association, whose main focus is on attaining recognition of Mineral King as a living historic community.
- The Mineral King Preservation Society, which is nonprofit, public-benefit corporation dedicated to preserving the natural and historic assets of the Mineral King area. Since its inception in 1986, the society has engaged in research, restoration, and preservation planning. Among its other activities is a new partnership with Sequoia National Park to ensure preservation of all historic resources in the National Register listed area and assist in volunteer projects and educational activities.

== See also ==
- Sierra Club v. Morton
