= Hale (surname) =

Hale is a surname. Lords of Loddon-Hales, Hale or "De Halys" trace back to Lord Roger De Halys circa 1130; his descendant Lord Roger De Halys married Alice Scrogins circa 1275, and their daughter Alice Hale married Thomas of Brotherton, 1st Earl of Norfolk, the son of Edward I of England. Those who were the ancestors of William Hale who married Rose Bond of Kingswaldenbury, their grandson George Hale (a drummer) came to America on the ship "Supply" in 1620, where he lived with the governor Sir Francis Wyatt of Virginia. Other Hale descendants also use the noble title Earl of Tenterden, Viscount of Tinsdall and the Baronets Of Beakesbourne and Coventry. Many Armorial achievements have also been used by Hale descendants. It is said that the Hales were related to Saint Edmund, King of East Anglia in which the Hales get their Arrows pointing downward in their coat of arms.

== Notable people with the surname ==
- Aiden Hale (1995–2023), American mass shooter
- Alan Hale (disambiguation), several people
- Albert Hale (1950–2021), American politician
- Albert W. Hale (1882–1947) American film director
- Alex Hale, Australian-American football player
- Alfie Hale (born 1939), Irish footballer and manager
- Alison Hale (born 1954/1955), New Zealand painter
- Amanda Hale (born 1982), British actress
- Amanda K. Hale, Canadian writer
- Angelica Hale, American child singer
- Artemas Hale (1783–1882), American politician
- Barbara Hale (1922–2017), American actress
- Barbara Hale (librarian) (1924–2013), New Zealand/Australian librarian
- Bob Hale (philosopher) (1945–2017), British philosopher
- Bonnie Leman (born Bonnie Hale; 1926–2010), writer, educator, and historian best known for founding and running Quilter's Newsletter Magazine
- Brenda Hale, Baroness Hale of Richmond (born 1945), British justice of the Supreme Court
- Bruce Hale, American attorney and author
- Calvin Henry Hale (1818–1887), American settler and politician in Washington Territory
- Cerys Hale (born 1993), Welsh rugby union player
- Chanin Hale (1928–2020), American actress
- Charles Hale (1831–1882), American legislator in the Massachusetts state House and Senate
- Charles R. Hale (bishop) (1837–1900), American coadjutor bishop of Springfield, Illinois
- Chris Hale (born 1966), American football defensive back of the 1980s and 1990s in the National Football League
- Clive Hale (1937–2005), Australian TV presenter
- Damian Hale (born 1969), Australian politician
- Daniel Hale (disambiguation), multiple people
- David Hale (disambiguation), multiple people
- DeMarlo Hale (born 1961), American baseball coach
- Denzil Hale (1928–2004), British footballer
- DeWitt Hale (1917–2018), American lawyer and politician
- Dorothy Hale (1905–1938), American socialite
- Edward Hale (disambiguation), multiple people
- Elizabeth Amherst Hale (1774–1826), Canadian artist
- Enoch Hale (1733–1813), American militia officer during the American Revolutionary War and brother of Lieutenant Nathan Hale
- Eugene Hale (1836–1918), American Senator from Maine (Rep)
- Franc Hale (1905/1906–1986), American actress
- Frank Lucien Hale (1895–1944), American soldier
- Frederick Hale (1874–1963), American Senator from Maine
- Gareth Hale (born 1953), British comedian (Hale & Pace)
- George Ellery Hale (1868–1938), American astronomer
- George Ernest Hale (1884–1966), Australian politician, unitarian minister in Adelaide, Australia
- Georgina Hale (1943–2024), British actress
- Harold Hale (1867–1947), Australian cricketer
- Helene Hale (1918–2013), American politician
- Henry S. Hale (1844–1921), American businessman
- Horace M. Hale (1833–1901), American educator
- Irving Hale (1861–1930), American general in the Spanish-American and Philippine-American Wars
- Jen Hale (born 1978), American journalist and sportscaster
- Jennifer Hale, American voice actress
- Joe Hale (producer) (1925–2025), American animator, layout artist, and film producer
- John Hale (disambiguation), multiple people
- Jonathan Hale (1891–1966), Canadian-born actor in film and television
- Joseph Hale (MP) (1913–1985), British engineer and politician
- Joseph R. Hale (1927–1993), American politician, member of the Illinois House of Representatives
- Leon Hale (1921–2021), American journalist and author
- Lucy Hale (born 1989), American actress and singer
- Lucy Hale Tapley (1857–1932), third president of Spelman College
- Lzzy Hale (born 1983), American singer, musician, and songwriter
- Mary Whitwell Hale (1810–1862), American teacher, school founder, and hymn writer
- Mason Hale (1929–1990), American lichenologist
- Matthew Hale (disambiguation), multiple people
- Mike Hale (born 1972), American motorcycle racer
- Minnie Anderson Hale, American lawyer
- Monte Hale (1919–2009), American actor and country musician
- Monte Hale (sportscaster) (1939–1982), American radio sports commentator and owner of radio stations
- Nathan Hale (disambiguation), multiple people
- Owen Hale (born 1948), American musician
- Philip Henry Hale (1850–1927), British-born American newspaper publisher, rancher, and music composer
- Pippa Hale (fl. 2024), British artist
- Robert Hale (disambiguation), multiple people
- Ruth Hale (disambiguation), multiple people
- Ryan Hale (born 1975), American football player
- Sara Hale (born 1982), Wales netball international
- Sarah Josepha Hale (1788–1879), American writer
- Sue Sally Hale (1937–2003), American polo player, coach and trainer
- Shannon Hale (born 1974), American author
- Steve Hale (born 1954), American politician
- Sunny Hale (1968–2017), American polo player
- Sylvia Hale (born 1942), Australian politician
- Tony Hale (born 1970), American actor
- Una Hale (1922–2005), Australian operatic soprano
- Walter Hale (1870−1956), British cricketer
- Warren Hale (disambiguation), multiple people
- William Hale (disambiguation), multiple people

== Fictional characters ==
- Alexander Hale, character from The Copenhagen Test
- Charlotte Hale, character from Westworld
- Cornelia Hale, character from W.I.T.C.H.
- Daniel Hale, character from Prison Break
- David Hale (Sons of Anarchy), the Deputy Chief in Sons of Anarchy
- Derek Hale, Laura Hale, Talia Hale, Peter Hale, Cora Hale, and Malia (Hale) Tate, characters from the MTV cult television series Teen Wolf (2011 TV series)
- Jasper Hale and Rosalie Hale, characters from Twilight (novel series) novel series
- John Hale, character from The Crucible
- Margaret Hale, heroine of North and South
- Steve Hale (Full House), character from Full House
- Saxton Hale, character from Team Fortress 2

== See also ==
- Hale (given name)
- Hale (disambiguation)
- Haile (surname)
