= Alta Peak =

Mountain peak in Sequoia National Park

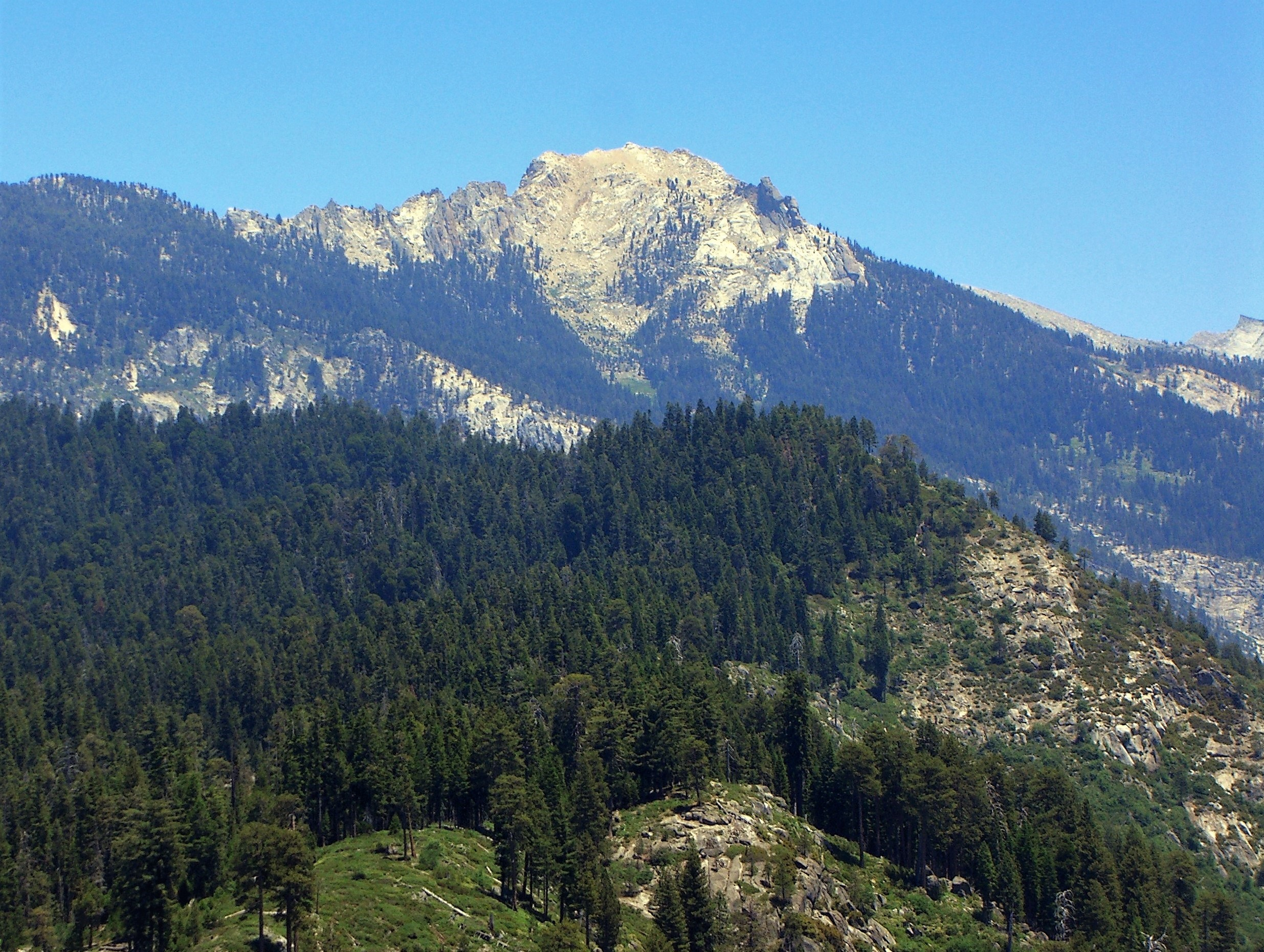
- West aspect, from Moro Rock

Highest point
- Elevation: 11,208 ft (3,416 m) NAVD 88
- Prominence: 124 ft (38 m)
- Listing: Sierra Peaks Section
- Coordinates: 36°35′26″N 118°39′48″W

Geography
- Location within California Location within the United States
- Location: Tulare County, California, U.S.
- Parent range: Sierra Nevada
- Topo map: USGS Lodgepole

Climbing
- First ascent: 1896 by William R, Dudley
- Easiest route: Hike, class 1

Alta Peak is in Sequoia National Park not far from Giant Forest. Before 1896, the mountain was known as Tharps Peak. By 1903 it was generally known by its current name and Alta Peak appears on the Tehipite quadrangle, USGS 30 minute topographic map of 1905, and was officially recognized by the Board on Geographic Names in 1928. The Sierra Club Bulletin noted that the name Alta Peak was "euphonious". A meadow on its southern slope had long been known as Alta Meadow. A rocky outcrop, 0.5 miles (0.8 km) southwest of the summit, is now known as Tharps Rock. Hale Tharp was the first euro-American to explore the Giant Forest area. His summer camp, a hollowed out Sequoia log near Crescent Meadow known as Tharp's Log, is popular with park visitors.
