= Hale (given name) =

Hale is a unisex given name. Notable people with the name include:

== Male ==
- Hale Appleman (born 1986), American actor
- Hale A. VanderCook (1864–1949), American composer and musician
- Hale Boggs (1914–1972), American politician
- Hale Hamilton (1880–1942), American actor
- Hale Hentges (born 1996), American football player
- Hale Irwin (born 1945), American golfer
- Hale Johnson (1847–1902), American politician
- Hale McCown (1914–2005), justice of the Nebraska Supreme Court
- Hale Tharp (1828–?), American gold prospector
- Hale T-Pole (Tevita Hale Nai Tu'uhoko) (born 1979), Tongan rugby union footballer
- Hale Woodruff (1900–1980), American artist
- Hale Zukas (1943–2022), American disability rights activist

== Female ==
- Hale Asaf (1905–1938), Turkish painter
- Hale Kimga (1944–1972), British model
- Hale Soygazi (born 1950), Turkish actress
- Hale Tenger (born 1960), Turkish artist

== Fictional characters ==
- Hale Santiago, in the Canadian television series Lost Girl

== See also ==
- Haleh, feminine given name of which Hale is an alternate spelling
- Hale (surname)
- Hale (disambiguation)
