= Haile (surname) =

Haile is a surname of Geez origin. The name meaning "power, might." Pronounced: HY-lee.

It is very common surname in Eritrea and Ethiopia, and throughout East Africa and diaspora .

It was second most popular surname in Eritrea followed by 13th most common in Ethiopia.

People with the surname include

- Abeba Haile (born 1970), Eritrean singer
- Almayahu Haile (died 1977), member of the military junta that ruled Ethiopia during the Ethiopian Revolution
- Asrat Haile (fl. 2000s), former manager of the Ethiopia national football team
- Berard Haile (1874–1961), Franciscan priest
- Chanyalew Haile (born 1949), Ethiopian boxer
- Eugen Haile (1873–1933), German-American composer, singer, and accompanist
- Ferrell Haile (fl. 2000s–2010s), member of the Tennessee State Senate
- Gebremedhin Haile (fl. 2010s), Ethiopian football coach who has managed the Ethiopia national football team
- Getatchew Haile (1932–2021), Ethiopian-American philologist
- John Haile (died 1535), vicar of Isleworth Middlesex
- Joseph Haile, namesake of the Joseph Haile House in Providence, Rhode Island
- Levi Haile (died 1854), Justice of the Rhode Island Supreme Court
- Margaret Haile (fl. 1900s), Canadian socialist
- Minasse Haile (born 1930), Minister of Foreign Affairs of Ethiopia
- Mitiku Haile (born 1951) Ethiopian professor of soil science
- Sossina M. Haile (born 1966), American chemist
- Tadesse Haile (born 1952), Ethiopian boxer
- Thomas Evans Haile, namesake of the historic Haile Homestead and Haile Plantation, Florida
- William Haile (New Hampshire politician) (1807–1876), Governor of New Hampshire
- William H. Haile (1833–1901), Mayor of Springfield, Massachusetts and Lieutenant Governor of Massachusetts
- William Haile (Mississippi politician) (1797-1837), U.S. Representative from Mississippi
- Yonatan Haile (born 1994), Eritrean cyclist

With Haile as part of the surname

- Yemane Haileselassie (born 1998), Eritrean steeplechase runner
- Yohannes Haile-Selassie (born 1961), Ethiopian paleoanthropologist

== See also ==
- Haile (disambiguation)
- Hale (surname)
- Haley (surname)
