= Cattle Cabin =

Historic house in California, United States

- U.S. National Register of Historic Places
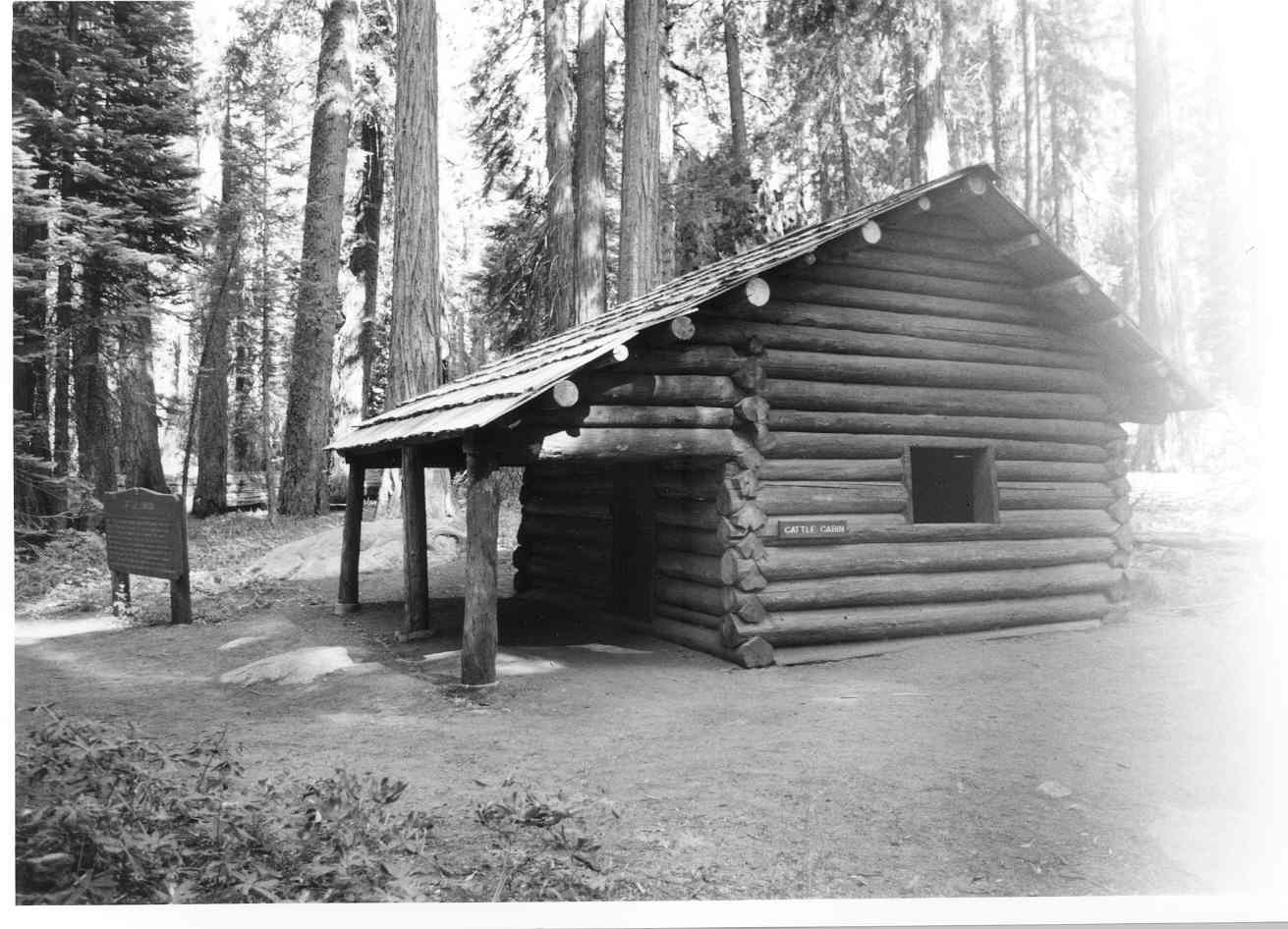

- Location within California Location within the United States
- Nearest city: Three Rivers, California
- Coordinates: 36°34′18″N 118°45′11″W
- Built: 1885
- Architectural style: Log cabin
- NRHP reference No.: 77000150
- Added to NRHP: September 15, 1977

The Cattle Cabin is a one-room log cabin that was built in the Sierra Nevada by Hale D. Tharp and two partners in 1890, in present-day Sequoia National Park, California.

Cattle Cabin is located in the Giant Forest of giant redwoods (Sequoiadendron giganteum), and is associated with Tharp's Log as a structure supporting ranching operations in the area. The cabin and the surrounding lands were bought by the National Park Service in 1916.
