= Edward Hale =

Edward Hale may refer to:

- Edward Hale (politician) (1800–1875), Canadian businessman and politician
- Edward Danforth Hale (1859–1945), music conservatory pedagogue, Dean of Music at the University of Colorado
- Edward Everett Hale (1822–1909), American author and clergyman
- Edward J. Hale (1839–1922), American soldier and diplomat
- Edward Hale (artist) (1852–1924), British artist
- Edward Hale (cricketer) (1764–1823), cricketer
- Edward Hale (rower) (born 1947), Australian rower
- Edward Hale (seigneur) (died 1862), member of the Special Council of Lower Canada
