= John Hales =

John Hales may refer to:

- John Hales (theologian) (1584–1656), English theologian
- John Hales (bishop of Exeter) from 1455 to 1456
- John Hales (bishop of Coventry and Lichfield) (died 1490) from 1459 to 1490
- John Hales (died 1540), MP for Canterbury
- John Hales (died 1572) (c. 1516–1572), English writer and politician
- John Hales (died 1608), at whose house some of the Marprelate tracts were printed
- John Hales (died 1639) (1603–1639), English courtier and politician
- John Hales (MP for New Shoreham) (1648–1723), English politician
- John Hales (trade unionist) (1839–fl. 1882), English trade unionist and radical activist
- John Wesley Hales (1836–1914), British scholar
- John Hales (archdeacon of Newark) (1870–1952), British Anglican priest
- John Hales (cricketer) (1833–1915), English cricketer and civil servant
- John Playford Hales (1893–1918), World War I flying ace

== See also ==
- John Hale (disambiguation)
