= Alan Hale =

Alan Hale or Allan Hale may refer to:

- Alan Hale Sr. (1892–1950), American actor, father of Alan Hale Jr.
- Allan M. Hale (1914–1997), American jurist, first Chief Justice (1972–84) of Massachusetts Appeals Court#Justices
- Alan Hale, American radio announcer in 1942 (List of Los Angeles Dodgers broadcasters#List of current and former broadcasters and stations)
- Alan Hale Jr. (1921–1990), American actor, "Skipper" on Gilligan's Island, son of Alan Hale Sr.
- Alan Hale (politician) (1953–2016), American Republican legislator from Montana
- Alan Hale (astronomer) (1958–2026), American astronomer
- Allan Hale (born 1987), Scottish manager of Maud F.C. from 2011 to 2018 (2017–18 North Superleague#Member clubs for the 2017–18 season)

== See also ==
- Allen Haley (1844–1900), Canadian Member of Parliament
- Hale (surname)
