= Warren Hale =

Warren Hale may refer to:

- Warren Stormes Hale (1791–1872), Lord Mayor of London and founder of the City of London School
- Warren Hale (manufacturer) (1811–1893), founder of Hale & Kilburn Manufacturing Company, Philadelphia, Pennsylvania
- Warren Hale (cricketer) (1862–1934), English cricketer
