= William Haile =

William Haile may refer to:

- William Haile (New Hampshire politician) (1807–1876), governor of New Hampshire
- William Haile (Mississippi politician) (died 1837), U.S. Representative from Mississippi
- William H. Haile, lieutenant governor of Massachusetts

== See also ==
- William Hale (disambiguation)
