= Crystal Cave (Sequoia National Park) =

Cave in Sequoia National Park, California

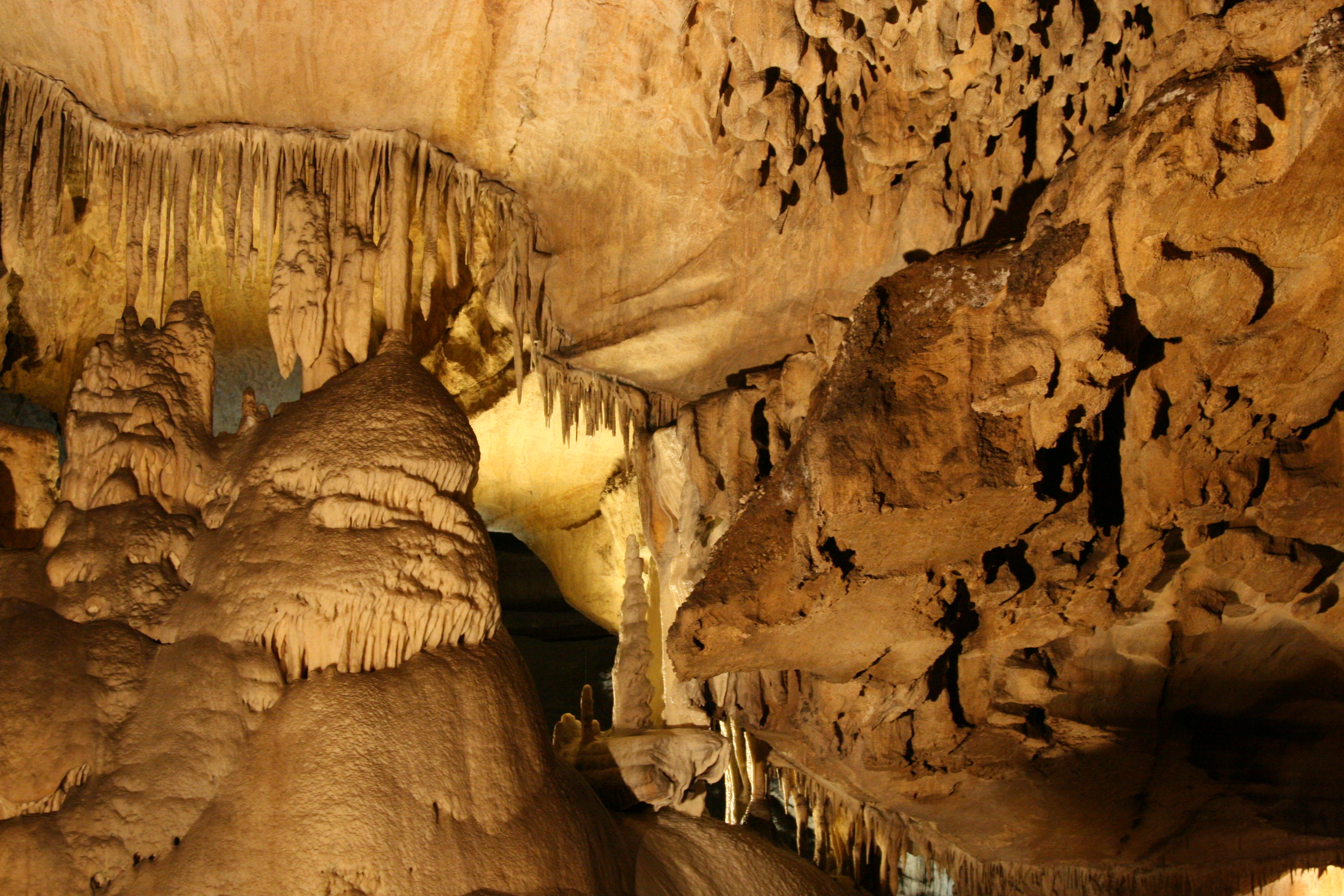
- Calcite formations in Crystal Cave
- Interactive map of Crystal Cave
- Location: Sequoia National Park, Tulare County, California, United States
- Coordinates: 36°35′22″N 118°49′32″W
- Length: 2.42 miles (3.89 km)
- Discovery: April 28, 1918 by Alex Medley and Cassius Webster
- Geology: Marble
- Access: Fee

Crystal Cave is a marble karst cave within Sequoia National Park, in the western Sierra Nevada of California. It is one of at least 240 known caves in Sequoia National Park but the only one accessible to the public. Crystal Cave is in the Giant Forest area, between the Ash Mountain entrance of the park and the Giant Forest museum.

The cave is a constant 48 °F (9 °C). It is accessible by Sequoia Park Conservancy guided tours only. Tickets are not sold on-site, but must be bought on SequoiaParksConservancy.org.
