= Alfred Bosworth =

American judge (1812–1862)

Justice of the Rhode Island Supreme Court
- In office November 1854 – June 10, 1862
- Preceded by: Levi Haile
- Succeeded by: J. Russell Bullock

Member of the Rhode Island House of Representatives
- In office 1839–1854

Personal details
- Born: 1812 Warren, Rhode Island, U.S.
- Died: June 10, 1862 (aged 49–50) Warren, Rhode Island, U.S.
- Party: Whig
- Education: Brown University
- Profession: Judge

Alfred Bosworth (1812–June 10, 1862) was a justice of the Rhode Island Supreme Court from November 1854 until his death on June 10, 1862.

Born at Warren, Rhode Island in 1812, Bosworth graduated from Brown University in 1835, and studied law with Judge Levi Haile. Bosworth served in the Rhode Island House of Representatives from 1839 to 1854, including three terms as Speaker. Bosworth was a member of the Whig Party. Upon the death of Judge Haile in 1854, Bosworth was elected to succeed him as an associate justice of the Supreme Court of Rhode Island, which office he continued to hold until his death in 1862. He also served as a Trustee of Brown University. Bosworth was of counsel for Rhode Island in suits growing out of the boundary question between Rhode Island and Massachusetts. He died at his home in Warren, Rhode Island.

Political offices
| Preceded by Levi Haile | Justice of the Rhode Island Supreme Court; 1854–1862 | Succeeded by J. Russell Bullock |
