= Tharp's Log =

Historic house in California, United States

- U.S. National Register of Historic Places
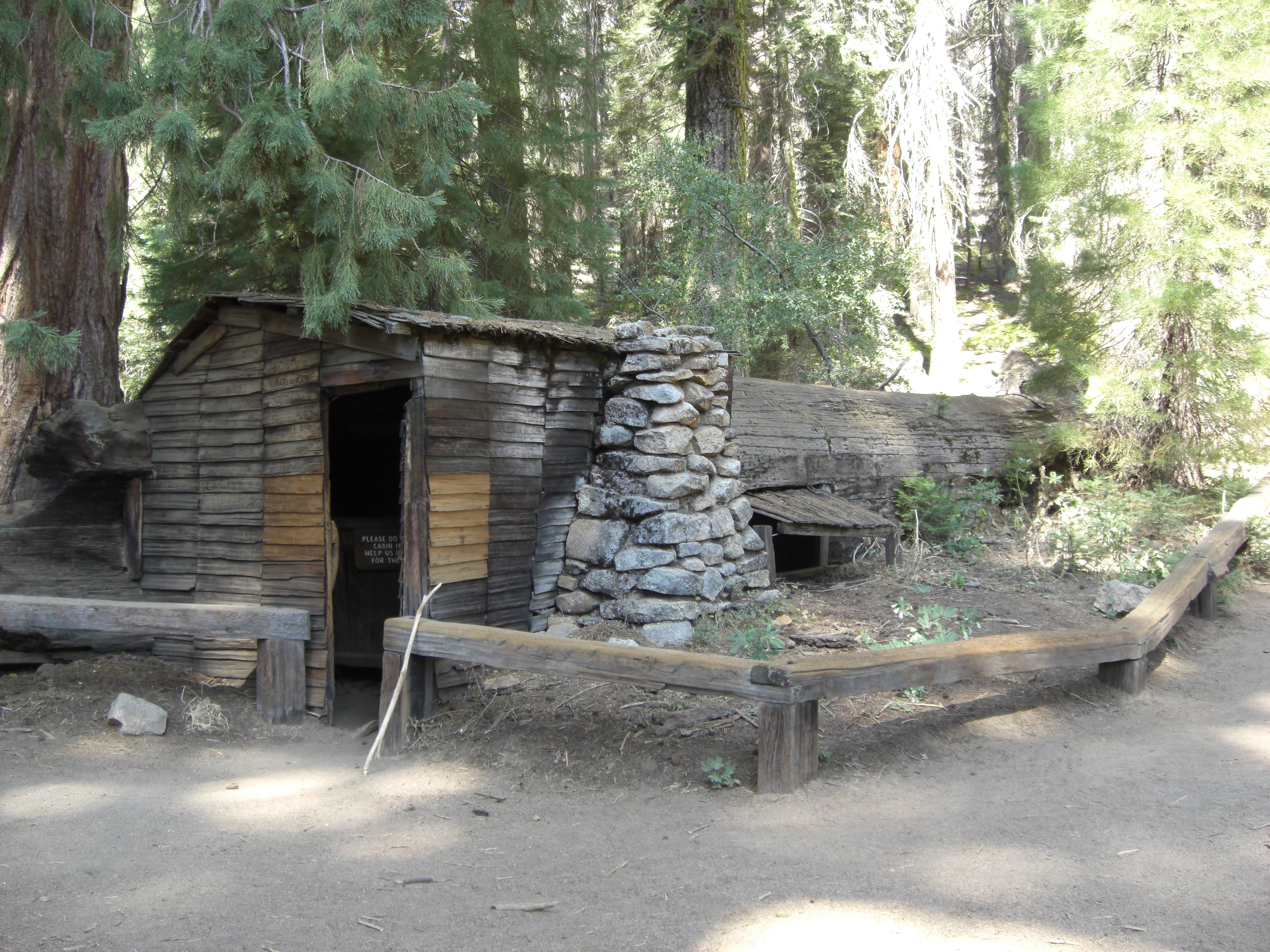
- Nearest city: Three Rivers, California
- Coordinates: 36°33′40″N 118°44′29″W
- Built: 1861
- Architect: Hale Tharp
- Architectural style: Log cabin
- NRHP reference No.: 77000117
- Added to NRHP: March 8, 1977

Tharp's Log is a hollowed giant sequoia (Sequoiadendron giganteum) log at Log Meadow in the Giant Forest grove of Sequoia National Park that was used as a shelter by early pioneers. The log is named after Hale D. Tharp, who was described as the first Non-Native American to enter the Giant Forest.

== History ==
Tharp had arrived in 1852 in the goldfields around Placerville, becoming a cattleman rather than a miner. Tharp moved to the area of the Kaweah River in 1856, and with guides from the Potwisha people of the area he explored the mountains above. Tharp went back in 1860 with his two sons. They climbed Moro Rock and made an encampment near Crescent Meadows. It was not until 1869 that Tharp moved a cattle herd into the Giant Forest area.

Tharp established a small summer cattle ranch at Giant Forest and used a fallen log as a cabin. The log was hollowed by fire through fifty-five feet of its seventy-foot length. A fireplace, door and window exist at the wider end, with a small shake-covered cabin extension.

John Muir described it as a "noble den".

== See also ==
- Cattle Cabin – another building associated with Hale Tharp in the Giant Forest area.
