= Haleh =

Haleh is a Persian feminine given name. It is the Persian form of Hala, an Arabic word that refers to the halo around the moon. People with the name include:

== Given name ==
- Haleh Afshar (1944–2022), British professor
- Haleh Esfandiari (born 1940), Iranian American academic
- Haleh Jamali, Iranian artist
- Haleh Sahabi (1958–2011), Iranian humanitarian and democracy activist
