= John Hale =

John Hale may refer to:

- Blessed John Haile (died 1535), English priest and martyr, also known as John Hale
- John Hale (Roundhead) (1614–1691), English politician
- John Hale (minister) (1636–1700), American Puritan minister
- John Hale (British Army officer) (1728–1806), British general
- John Hale (Canadian politician) (1765–1838), member of the Legislative Council of Lower Canada
- John P. Hale (1806–1873), United States Representative and Senator from New Hampshire
- John K. Hale (New York politician) (1807–1879), American politician, member of the New York State Assembly and New York State Senate
- John Hale (cricketer) (1830–1878), English cricketer
- John Blackwell Hale (1831–1905), United States Representative from Missouri
- Johnny Hale (died 1881), American rancher and cattle rustler
- John K. Hale (Iowa politician) (1858–1946), American politician, member of the Iowa House of Representatives and Iowa Senate
- John Henry Hale (1878–1944), American surgeon
- John Rigby Hale (1923–1999), English historian of the Renaissance
- John R. Hale (archaeologist) (born 1951), American archaeologist and historian of Athens
- John Hale (baseball) (born 1953), American baseball player

== See also ==
- John Hales (disambiguation)
- Jack Hale (disambiguation)
- Jonathan Hale (1891–1966), Canadian/American actor
