= Robert Hales =

Robert Hales may refer to:

- Sir Robert Hales (knight) (c. 1325–1381), Lord High Treasurer of England
- Robert Hales (director), British graphic designer and music video director
- Robert D. Hales (1932–2017), American leader in the Church of Jesus Christ of Latter-day Saints
- Sir Robert Hales, 1st Baronet (c. 1610–c. 1695), English lawyer and politician

== See also ==
- Robert Hale (disambiguation)
