= Robert Hale =

Robert Hale or Bob Hale may refer to:

== Politicians ==
- Robert Hale (Maine politician) (1889–1976), U.S. Representative from Maine
- Robert Blagden Hale (1807–1883), British Member of Parliament for West Gloucestershire
- Robert F. Hale (born 1947), Under Secretary of Defense and Assistant Secretary of the Air Force
- Robert S. Hale (1822–1881), U.S. Representative from New York

== Other people ==
- Bob Hale (baseball) (1933–2012), American baseball player
- Bob Hale (philosopher) (1945–2017), British philosopher of mathematics
- Robert Hale (actor) (1874–1940), English actor featured in Waltzes from Vienna, etc.
- Robert Hale (bass-baritone) (1933–2023), American opera singer
- Robert Hale (doctor) (1702–1767), physician of Beverly, Massachusetts
- Robert Allen Hale (1941–2008), felon known as 'Papa Pilgrim'
- Robert Beverly Hale (1901–1985), art writer and curator
- Robert G. Hale (born 1956), oral and maxillofacial surgeon
- Robert Lee Hale (1884–1969), American legal realist and institutional economist
- Robert M. Hale (1895–1952), American college football player and coach

== Other uses ==
- Robert Hale (publishers), a British literary publishing house
- Bob Hale, a character in the children's TV series Horrible Histories

== See also ==
- Robert Hales (disambiguation)
