= John R. Hale (archaeologist) =

American archaeologist and historian (born 1951)

John R. Hale (born 1951) is an American archaeologist and historian. He was a highly regarded professor and field archeologist, and was Director of the Liberal Studies Program at the University of Louisville. He lectures widely for the public on topics in classicism, ancient history, and archeology and his archeological fieldwork has been featured in a number of documentary films for the Discovery Channel and the History channel.

== Early life and education ==
Born and raised in New Albany, Indiana, Hale earned his B.A. undergraduate degree in Archaeology at Yale, where he rowed for four years on the Lightweight Crew rowing team, and also rowed in his Senior year in the 1973 Yale-Harvard race at New London, Connecticut, the oldest intercollegiate sporting event in American history. During his studies at Yale, John Hale was profoundly influenced by military historian Donald Kagan. He earned his PhD at Cambridge, where his dissertation was on the Bronze Age ancestors of the famous Viking longships.

== The Oracle at Delphi ==
He is an expert on the ancient religion and modern science of geological fumes at the ancient site of the Delphic Oracle in Greece, and has spoken on the topic widely. His research, along with that of geologist Jelle Zeilinga de Boer, has demonstrated that the psychoactive gas ethylene seeped from under the oracular site, and would have led to an "altered mental status" by the Pythia, the prophetess-priestess of the Temple of Apollo at Delphi. Later research has further supported the geological fumes theory.

Professor Hale's research on the geological fumes theory is recounted in The Oracle: Lost Secrets and Hidden Message of Ancient Delphi, by science writer William Broad. It was also featured in the August 2003 issue of Scientific American magazine.

== Books and other writing ==
John Hale has authored a number of books. His book on the Athenian navy and the birth of classical democracy was well reviewed in both popular and academic press. It is entitled Lords of the Sea: The Epic Story of the Athenian Navy and the Birth of Democracy (2009).

He has written a number of articles for Scientific American, including about the Viking Longship, and the technology of ancient Greek rowing. and has published widely in academic journals.

== Video Lecture Series ==
Professor Hale has created numerous well-reviewed long-form lecture series for audio and video with The Great Courses. These include:

- Greek and Persian Wars (24 lectures)
- Classical Archaeology of Ancient Greece and Rome (36 lectures)
- Art of Public Speaking: Lessons from the Greatest Speeches in History (12 lectures)
- Exploring the Roots of Religion (36 lectures)
- Great Tours: Greece and Turkey, from Athens to Istanbul (24 lecturers)

These lecture series are available both on DVD and CD, and two of them are available through "The Great Courses Plus" streaming service.

== Archeological Travel Tours ==
Professor Hale has conducted numerous archeological tours, for academic and travel institutions such as the Archaeological Institute of America, Thalassa Journeys, and Yale Educational Travel. His tours cover extensive geography, including Northern Greece and Albania.
