= Walter Hale =

English cricketer

Personal information
- Full name: Walter Henry Hale
- Born: 6 March 1870; West Bromwich, Staffordshire, England
- Died: 12 August 1956 (aged 86); Bishopston, Bristol, England
- Batting: Right-handed
- Bowling: Right-arm slow
- Role: Batsman

Domestic team information
- Years: Team
- 1892: Somerset
- 1895–1909: Gloucestershire
- First-class debut: 2 June 1892 Somerset v Surrey
- Last First-class: 3 August 1909 Gloucestershire v Somerset

Career statistics
Competition	First-class
Matches	69
Runs scored	2124
Batting average	18.96
100s/50s	2/8
Top score	135
Balls bowled	713
Wickets	9
Bowling average	46.00
5 wickets in innings	–
10 wickets in match	–
Best bowling	2/19
Catches/stumpings	40/–
- Source: CricketArchive, 4 April 2011

Walter Henry Hale (6 March 1870 – 12 August 1956) played first-class cricket for Somerset in 1892 and for Gloucestershire from 1895 to 1909. He was born at West Bromwich, then in Staffordshire, and died at Bishopston, Bristol.

Hale was a right-handed batsman who, in a long cricket career, appeared both in the middle-order and the lower-order and, on occasion, as an opener. He also bowled occasional right-arm slow deliveries but in 69 first-class matches took only nine wickets in all. In 1891, he played in non-first-class matches for Shropshire to whom he was then club professional, and other teams in that area. He played for Somerset in eight matches in 1892, achieving little, and at the end of the season played as a professional in Lancashire League matches for Burnley and Enfield, being particularly effective as a bowler. He appeared for Burnley in matches in the next three seasons but then, according to his obituary in the 1957 edition of Wisden Cricketers' Almanack, he was invited to join Gloucestershire by W. G. Grace.

After a single match in 1895, he started appearing in a few matches for Gloucestershire each season from 1897 to 1907, with a couple of final matches in 1909. Only in 1899, when he played in 11 games, did he appear in more than half a dozen games, and more than half of the games he played for the county were early-season matches that started in May, a time when county cricket's regular contingent of amateur players tended to be less available. His highest aggregate of runs was 470 in the 1899 season and in 1901 he was top of the Gloucestershire averages, with 334 runs at an average of 37.11, beating Gilbert Jessop in that season. He hit an unbeaten 109 in that season in the match against Essex. The Wisden obituary records Hale reminiscing about the pace of Essex fast bowler Charles Kortright and claiming that "he hit me black and blue"; in fact, the bulk of the Essex bowling was done by medium-pace bowlers and Kortright failed to take a wicket in his 20 overs. In 1902, he improved on that score with an innings of 135, including 21 fours and a six, that enabled Gloucestershire to draw the match against Nottinghamshire after being made to follow on. This was the highest score of Hale's first-class career.

Hale played club cricket for Knowle in south Bristol for 34 years from the age of 17 and scored over 25,000 runs for the club. He was also a rugby union forward for Bristol Rugby Football Club and played county rugby for both Somerset and Gloucestershire.
