= Harold Hale =

Australian cricketer

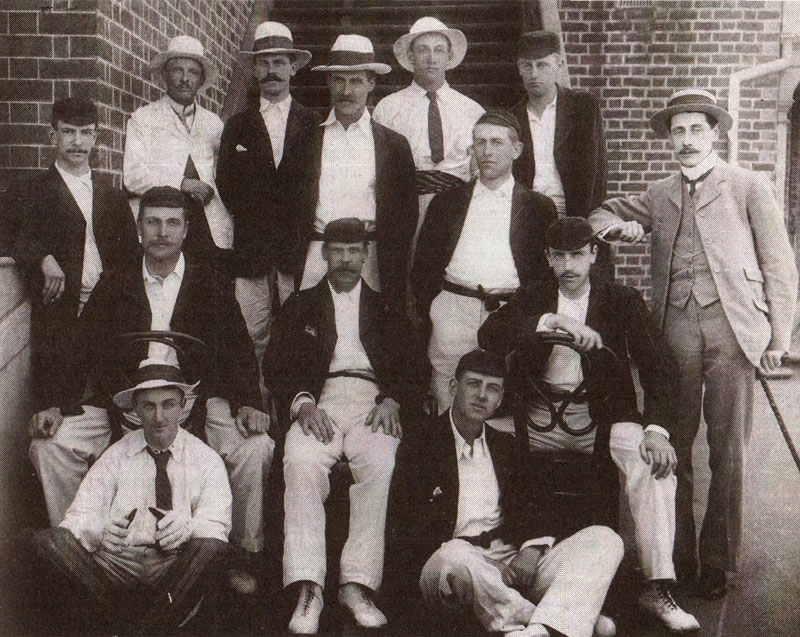
- The Tasmanian cricket team that beat Victoria at the MCG in 1902–03. Harold Hale is standing fourth from left.

Personal information
- Born: 27 March 1867; Perth, Colony of Western Australia
- Died: 2 August 1947 (aged 80); Melbourne, Victoria
- Batting: Right-handed
- Bowling: Right-arm off-spin Right-arm medium

Domestic team information
- Years: Team
- 1883/84–1910/11: Tasmania
- 1886–1887: Gloucestershire
- 1887–1890: Cambridge University

Career statistics
Competition	First-class
Matches	57
Runs scored	1,067
Batting average	12.12
100s/50s	0/1
Top score	53
Balls bowled	4,983
Wickets	99
Bowling average	23.18
5 wickets in innings	6
10 wickets in match	0
Best bowling	7/42
Catches/stumpings	24/–
- Source: Cricinfo, 22 April 2020

Harold Hale (27 March 1867 – 2 August 1947) was an Australian cricketer.

Hale was born in Perth in the Colony of Western Australia, the son of Matthew Hale, then Bishop of Perth and later Bishop of Brisbane. He went to school at The Hutchins School in Hobart. He toured New Zealand with the Tasmanian cricket team when he was 16, opening the bowling with Tom Kendall in the four first-class matches on the tour, taking 21 wickets at a bowling average of 9.47 runs per wicket.

His father retired to England in 1885, and Hale attended Trinity College, Cambridge between 1886 and 1889. He played cricket for the University in 1887, 1889 and 1890, receiving his cricket blue. He also played for Gloucestershire. He graduated with a degree in Theology and tutored in England for about 10 years before returning to Tasmania. He again played for the state team, finishing his first-class career in 1911. He conducted a small private school in New Norfolk and later farmed in the area.

Hale married Georgina Officer in Melbourne in December 1901, and they had three sons and two daughters. He died in 1947 in a Melbourne hospital aged 80; his wife predeceased him.
