= Ruth Hale =

Ruth Hale may refer to:

- Ruth Hale (feminist) (1887–1934), American feminist
- Ruth Hale (playwright and actress) (1908–2003), American playwright and actress
