= Hale & Kilburn =

Furniture manufacturing company

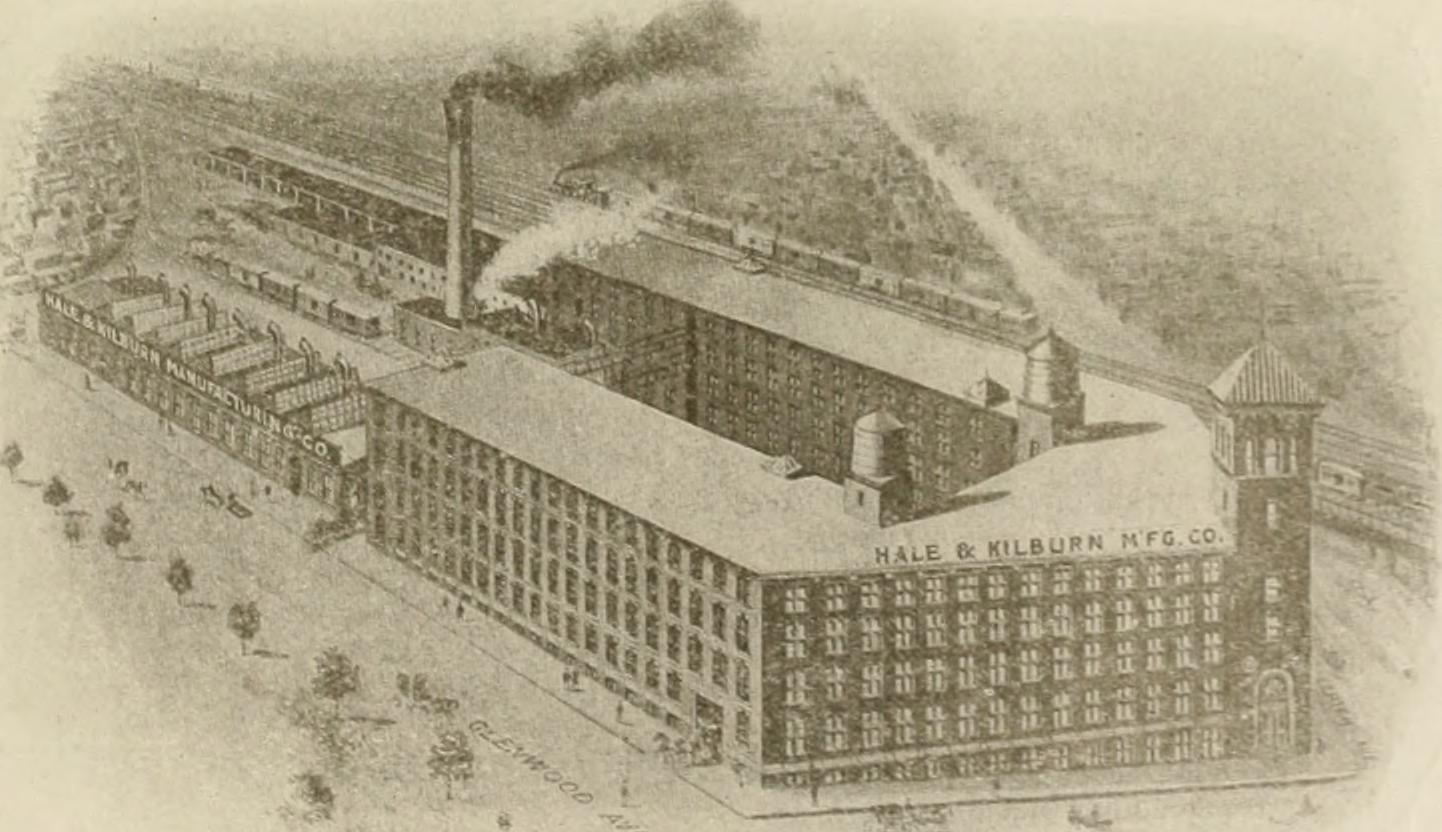
Hale & Kilburn factory in Philadelphia

The Hale & Kilburn company of Philadelphia was a furniture manufacturing company founded by Warren Hale and Cheney Kilburn. The Hale & Kilburn company's primary business was the production of railroad car seats for the greatly expanding American railroad companies.

== History ==
=== Founding ===
Hale, Kilburn, & Co. was organized in 1867 by Warren Hale, Cheney Kilburn, two of Hale's sons and Artemus Kilburn, brother of Cheney Kilburn. It was incorporated as the Hale & Kilburn Manufacturing Company in 1876 with Cheney Kilburn serving as its first president and Warren Hale serving as vice president. Warren Hale's son, Henry S. Hale, became president after him.

=== Edward Budd ===
Edward Budd started his career working at the American Pulley Company as a machinest. The American Pulley Company's main purpose was to make steel pulleys for railway cars vs the traditional iron pulleys. The American Pulley Company also supplied stamped seat pedestals to Hale & Kilburn. In 1902, Budd joined Hale & Kilburn for twice his salary, and shortly after he rose the ranks to become general manager. Once Hale & Kilburn went under new ownership, Budd left the company in 1931 as the new owners didn't agree with him.

=== J.P. Morgan Bud& Co. ===
The Hale & Kilburn company was sold to J.P. Morgan & Co. in 1911 for $9 million.

=== American Motor Body Company ===
The Hale & Kilburn company was reorganized in 1920 as the American Motor Body Company, a corporation founded by the American Can Company to merge Hale & Kilburn and the Wadsworth Manufacturing Company (Detroit, Michigan). In 1923, Charles M. Schwab purchased the American Motor Body Company. On September 4, 1925, Walter Chrysler announced the Chrysler Corporation's purchase of the Detroit plant of the American Motor Body Corporation. In 1926, the American Motor Body Corporation and its Safeway Six-Wheel subsidiary were sold to the American Car and Foundry Company.
