= Levi Haile =

American judge (1797–1854)

Levi Haile (May 1797 – July 14, 1854) was an American lawyer and politician who served as a justice of the Rhode Island Supreme Court from June 1835 until his death July 1854.

Born in Warren, Rhode Island in May 1797, Haile graduated at Brown University in 1821 and returned to Warren to work as a lawyer. He represented the town in the Rhode Island House of Representatives from 1824 to 1835 when he was elected as Associate Justice in 1835. He continued serving as a supreme court judge until his death in 1854. As Justice of the Peace in 1832 he heard an extradition case for a high-profile murder.

He was a leader of the Constitutional Party and then a Whig. Alfred Bosworth studied law under him.

Haile was married twice, first to Ann on April 5, 1824, and later to Phebe Elvira Tanner, with whom he raised seven children, two of whom survived to adulthood.

Haile died of cholera, after an illness of 24 hours, in his home in Warren. In 1975 the state historical preservation commission wrote about his house in an area report. His family lands are now part of a land trust.

Political offices
Preceded by Samuel Eddy	Justice of the Rhode Island Supreme Court; 1835–1854	Succeeded by Alfred Bosworth
