= Daniel Hale (disambiguation) =

Daniel Hale (born 1987) is an American whistleblower and former intelligence analyst.

Daniel Hale may also refer to:

- Daniel Hale (politician) (died 1821), American politician, Secretary of State of New York 1798–1801 and 1810–1811
- Daniel Hale (Prison Break), a character on the American television series Prison Break
