= Edward Hale (cricketer) =

English cricketer (1764–1823)

Edward Hale (born 1 September 1764 at Hambledon, Hampshire; died 16 November 1823 at Hambledon) was an English amateur cricketer who made 3 known appearances in important matches from 1789 to 1797.

== Career ==
He was mainly associated with Hampshire.
