= John Hales (cricketer) =

English cricketer and civil servant

Personal information
- Full name: John Hales
- Born: 16 September 1833; Charmouth, Dorset, England
- Died: 25 January 1915 (aged 81); Bournemouth, Hampshire, England
- Batting: Right-handed
- Bowling: Right-arm roundarm fast-medium

Domestic team information
- Years: Team
- 1855–1859: Cambridge University

Career statistics
| Competition | First-class |
|---|---|
| Matches | 8 |
| Runs scored | 69 |
| Batting average | 4.60 |
| 100s/50s | –/– |
| Top score | 19 |
| Balls bowled | – |
| Wickets | – |
| Bowling average | – |
| 5 wickets in innings | – |
| 10 wickets in match | – |
| Best bowling | – |
| Catches/stumpings | 5/– |
- Source: Cricinfo, 7 October 2018

John Hales (16 September 1833 – 25 January 1915) was an English first-class cricketer and civil servant.

The son of the Reverend John Dixon, Hales was born at Charmouth in September 1833. He attended Rugby School, before progressing to Trinity College, Cambridge. While attending Trinity College, Hales made his debut in first-class cricket for Cambridge University against Cambridge Town Club at Fenner's in 1855. He played first-class cricket for the university from 1855–1859, making eight appearances. Hales had an unspectacular record for the university in first-class matches, scoring 67 run across 14 innings, averaging just 4.78, with a highest score of 19. Despite this, he still gained a cricket blue.

After graduating from the university with a Masters in 1861, Hales entered into employment as a clerk in the Colonial Office. He later made a final appearance in first-class cricket, when he played for the Surrey Club against the Marylebone Cricket Club at The Oval in 1865. He later rose to the position of Chief Clerk within the Colonial Office, a position he held until his retirement in 1893. He spent his final years in Bournemouth, where he died in January 1915.
