= Henry S. Hale =

Philadelphia inventor and industrialist (1844–1921)

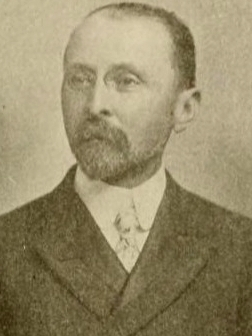
- Henry S. Hale
- Born: Henry Safford Hale; July 15, 1844
- Died: November 26, 1921 (aged 77); Montreal, Canada
- Occupations: Entrepreneur, inventor
- Employer: Hale & Kilburn
- Spouse: Frances Emogene Kilburn (m. 1866)
- Children: 2

Henry S. Hale (July 15, 1844 – November 26, 1921) was a Philadelphia inventor and industrialist. He was president of the Hale & Kilburn company of Philadelphia. The Hale & Kilburn company's primary business was the production of railroad car seats for the expanding American railroad companies. The Hale & Kilburn company was sold to J.P. Morgan & Co. in 1911 for $9 million.

== Early life ==
Henry Safford Hale was born on July 15, 1844, to Rhoda (née Stone) and Warren Hale.

== Career ==
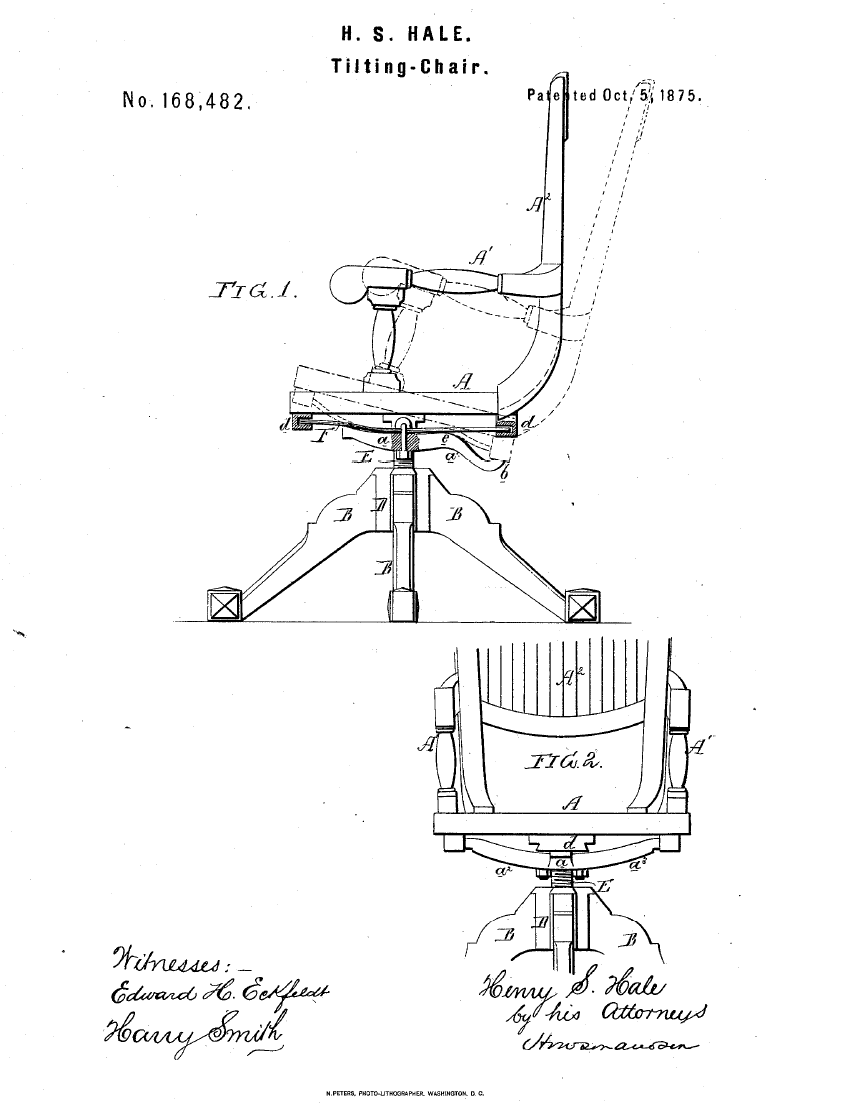
US patent issued to Hale for improvements in chairs with tilting seats (1875)

Hale was the president of Hale & Kilburn. In 1911, the company was sold to J.P. Morgan & Co. By 1911, he became president of the Railway Equipment Corporation.

In 1895, Hale purchased The Balsams Grand Resort Hotel (then called Dix House) in Dixville Notch, New Hampshire. From 1895 to 1921, he supervised the expansion of The Balsams' grounds, including adding multiple lakes, a canal system, and the creation of its Panorama golf course in Colebrook, New Hampshire.

== Personal life ==
He married Frances Emogene Kilburn of Burlington, Vermont, the daughter of his father's business partner Cheney Kilburn, on October 10, 1866. Together, they had one son, Henry Warren Kilburn Hale, and one daughter.

== Later life and death ==
In 1917, Hale offered 16 farms, approximately 5,000 acres (2,000 ha), in the White Mountains region of Coos County, New Hampshire, to the United States Department of Agriculture.

Hale died at the age of 77 on November 26, 1921, in Montreal, Canada, while visiting his son.
