= Edward Danforth Hale =

American music teacher (1859–1945)

- Born: February 1, 1859; Aquebogue, New York
- Died: November 6, 1945 (aged 86); Colorado Springs, Colorado
- Occupations: Pedagogue, music professor

Edward Danforth Hale (February 1, 1859 in Aquebogue, New York – November 6, 1945 in Colorado Springs, Colorado) was a music school pedagogue in piano, music harmony, and composition and a collegiate music school dean. Hale was well known during his tenure at Colorado College as a proponent of standardized music education in public schools. He argued that curricular music in primary and secondary schools enhanced students' performance in classic core academics and made the classical core more comprehensive.

== Education ==
=== Williams College ===
Hale graduated from Williams College in 1880 with an AB and 1883 with an MA. He was a Phi Beta Kappa.

=== New England Conservatory ===
Hale studied at the New England Conservatory 1881 to 1884, 1886, and 1888. For all except one of the semesters, Hale studied piano with Alfred Dudley Turner. With the exception of 4 semesters, Hale was enrolled in piano studies only. During two of the semesters, Hale also took voice lessons with John O'Neill; two semesters of harmony with Stephen Albert Emery (1841–1891) and one semester of counterpoint with Stephen Albert Emery. Hale did not receive a diploma per se; most students did not at that time.

== Career ==
=== New England Conservatory ===
Hale taught at the New England Conservatory from 1886 to 1896, and again from 1901 to 1904. While on the faculty, Hale wrote a regular column called "Musical Pedagogy" for The New England Conservatory Magazine during the first few years of the 20th century.

=== Hartford Theological Seminary ===
In 1891, while a professor at New England Conservatory, Hale taught piano (elementary and advanced) at the School for Church Musicians at the Hartford Seminary.

=== Colorado College School of Music ===
Hale served as the Dean of the School of Music at Colorado College in Colorado Springs from 1905 to 1906. In 1906, his title changed to Dean of the Department of Music, Professor of the Theory and Literature of Music and Pianoforte, in which he was chair until 1936 when he was made Dean Emeritus. Colorado College conferred on Hale an Honorary MusD degree June 16, 1926.

== Publications ==
- Edward Danforth Hale, "The Pianoforte Legato", Etude Magazine, March 1904
- Edward Danforth Hale, et al. Four lectures on the fine arts, Colorado Springs (1936)
- Edward Danforth Hale, How to Learn Music, The Hartford Herald (Hartford, Kentucky), Col 4, pg. 5, March 07, 1894

== Education ==
- Southold Academy, Southold, Long Island, New York (founded 1834)
- 1880 — Williams College
- New England Conservatory

== Family ==
His parents were Eusebius and Lucy Dinsmore Hale, his wife Bertha Charlotte Bartlett Hale. His children were Danforth Rawson Hale, Donald Emerson Hale, and Helen Bartlett Hale
