= William Hale =

William Hale may refer to:

== Academics ==
- William Gardner Hale (1849–1928), American classical scholar and professor of Latin
- William Jasper Hale (1874–1944), president of the historically black Tennessee State University
- William Mathew Hale (born 1940), specialist on Turkey and Turkish politics, and professor of politics

== Politicians ==
- William Hale (British politician) (1686–1717), British Whig politician
- William Hale (New Hampshire politician) (1765–1848), U.S. Representative from New Hampshire
- William Hale (Michigan politician) (1809–1874), Michigan Attorney General
- William Hale (Wyoming politician) (1832–1885), Wyoming Territory governor, 1882–1885, and Iowa legislator

== Writers ==
- William Hale Hale (1795–1870), author and Archdeacon of London
- William Bayard Hale (1869–1924), American journalist
- William Harlan Hale (1910–1974), American writer, journalist and editor

== Other ==
- William Hale (British inventor) (1797–1870), British inventor and rocket pioneer
- William Ellery Hale (1836–1898), American businessman
- William John Hale (1862–1929), British architect
- William King Hale (1874–1962), U.S. cattleman convicted of murder and conspiracy in the Osage Indian murders
- Bill Hale (1915–2007), Australian rugby league player
- William Hale (director) (1931–2020), American film and television director

== See also ==
- William Haile (disambiguation)
- Willie Hale (Willie George Hale or 'Little Beaver', born 1945), American R&B musician
