= Alan Hale (politician) =

Member of the Montana House of Representatives (1953–2016)

Member of the Montana House of Representatives from the 77th district
- In office 2011–2013
- Preceded by: Scott Mendenhall
- Succeeded by: Kirk Wagoner

Personal details
- Born: February 24, 1953 McNary, Arizona
- Died: April 23, 2016 (aged 63) East Helena, Montana
- Party: Republican
- Profession: business owner

Alan Hale (February 24, 1953 — April 23, 2016) was an American political figure who served as a Republican member of the Montana Legislature. He was elected to House District 77 which represents the Jefferson County area. Hale gained attention when he argued that DUI laws are harmful to small business owners.

This is a locator map showing Jefferson County in Montana.

== Political experience ==
Born in McNary, a census-designated place in Arizona, Hale was elected in 2010 to represent District 77 in the Montana House of Representatives. In 2012, however, he lost the Republican primary to Kirk Wagoner.

== Death and family ==
Alan Hale died at his home in East Helena two months past his 63rd birthday. He and his wife Gail were the parents of five children.

== Professional experience ==
- Owner of Silver Saddle Bar and Café
- Business Manager
- Logger
- Miner
- Truck Driver
- Construction Worker
