= David Hale =

David Hale may refer to:

== People ==
- David Hale (American football) (born 1983), American retired National Football League player
- David Hale (Australian cricketer) (born 1941), Australian cricketer
- David Hale (baseball) (born 1987), American baseball pitcher
- David Hale (diplomat) (born 1962), American diplomat, United States Under Secretary of State for Political Affairs
- David Hale (economist) (1951–2015), American economist
- David Hale (English cricketer) (born 1966), English former cricketer
- David Hale (footballer) (born 1984), Australian rules footballer
- David Hale (general) (born c. 1946), American retired general, court-martialed for sexual misconduct
- David Hale (ice hockey) (born 1981), American retired National Hockey League player
- David Hale (Whitewater), former Arkansas municipal judge convicted of fraud, Whitewater trial witness
- David J. Hale (born 1967), United States federal judge, United States District Court for the Western District of Kentucky
- David Hale (Kentucky politician), member of the Kentucky House of Representatives

== Characters ==
- David Hale (Sons of Anarchy), on the American TV series Sons of Anarchy
