= Matthew Hale =

Matthew Hale may refer to:

- Mathew Hale (bishop) (1811–1895), frequently spelled "Matthew", Anglican bishop in Australia; Bishop of Perth; Bishop of Brisbane
- Matthew Hale (jurist) (1609–1676), English jurist
- Matthew Hale (New York politician) (1829–1897), New York lawyer and politician
- Matthew F. Hale (born 1971), American white supremacist

== See also ==
- Matthew Hales, real name of singer-songwriter Aqualung
