= Robert M. Hale =

American football player and coach (1895–1952)

Biographical details
- Born: October 11, 1895; New Hope, Virginia, U.S.
- Died: February 10, 1952 (aged 56); Elmhurst, Illinois, U.S.
- Education: Miami University (OH)

Playing career
- 1915–1916: Miami (OH)
- 1919–1920: Miami (OH)

Coaching career (HC unless noted)
- 1922–1927: Elmhurst

Robert Moffett Hale (October 11, 1895 – February 10, 1952) was an American college football player and coach. He served as the head football coach at Elmhurst College from 1922 to 1927. Hale was the dean of Morton Junior College in Cicero, Illinois from 1948 until he died, on February 10, 1952, at Elmhurst Memorial Hospital in Elmhurst, Illinois.

Hale was captain of the Mansfield High School football team in Mansfield, Ohio. He attended Miami University (Ohio), where he, nicknamed "Red" Hale, played football for the Redskins. His time at college was interrupted by an Army career during World War I, but he returned for his degree thereafter.

Following graduation from Miami, Hale pursued a career in academia, attending the University of Chicago and earning his masters and Doctor's degrees in History in 1928 and 1945. He taught history at Elmhurst College and, beginning in 1928, at Morton Junior College, where he later became dean.
