= Haleh Jamali =

Iranian artist

Haleh Jamali (Persian: هاله جمالی) is an Iranian artist currently living and working in Scotland. She works with a wide range of media and techniques that include painting, photography, installation, video, and performance. She completed her Bachelors of Arts in Painting at the College of Fine Arts, University of Tehran, in 2005. In 2007, she received her MA in Art and Media Practice from the University of Westminster, London. Her works focus on the hidden layers beneath the visible by using the media of painting and installation.

== Paintings ==
Jamali’s interest in portraiture and narrative is inspired by her desire to address the social aspects of representation, particularly of the female gender. Jamali states: “For me, the diversity, versatility, and unrivaled ability of portraits to communicate, make them an enigma. Indeed, my particular concern is to reveal the paradoxes and ambiguities behind the eyes of the portrait subject who tries to communicate emotions, arrest attention, and often express feelings of both attraction and repulsion." Jamali encourages an intimate relationship between the viewer and the subject; she considers how an individual’s identity can be constructed in relation to Others, while simultaneously suggesting that the Self and the Other are inseparable.

In September 2014, Haleh trained at Charles H. Cecil Studios for advanced portraiture painting in Florence, Italy.

== Installation and video works ==
Jamali's installations and video works are often focused on themes of identity. She has been included in exhibitions such as the Finalist Exhibition of 6°Arte Laguna Prize; Nappe of Arsenale of Venice, Italy; Fashion Art Toronto Festival; multi-arts event, Toronto, Canada; HB55 Räume der Kunst, Berlin, Germany; Propeller Centre for the Visual Arts, Toronto-Canada; Edinburgh Iranian Festival, Edinburgh, UK; and La Viande Gallery, London, UK.

For Someone who is not like anyone (2007), she created a single-screen video installation exploring the depth of female identity that is primarily based on women's appearance by focusing on how their identity can be made fluid by different types of clothing. This video first exhibited in relation to the installation it originally animated. It was a chamber surrounded by transparent black fabric through which the viewer can see a distant video image: a series of portrait images on a different plane. The painting was placed at the entrance of the installation. When the audience entered the installation, they would see a glass bin, which held a reflection of both the changing projected photographic portrait and the viewer. The glass served as a mirror to cause the audience to identify themselves as "the Other". In response, viewers were encouraged to develop their own narrative from their life experiences.

In Departure (2011), she collaborated for the first time with a performer, Monica De Ioanni. In this work, a figure was set against a white ground wrapped in fabric to create different shapes, sometimes abstract ones. Jamali was fascinated by the relationship between women and fabric and more specifically, the drapes and forms created by the veil and the invisible gaze of the veiled women. De Ioanni used fabric as a symbol to show the struggles and sometimes the frustration of individuals whose identities have been disguised.

In Layers (2011), Jamali presented her self-portrait in two large-scale simultaneous projections that moved in coordinated timing. In the first projection, she applied clay to her face to cover the surface, while in the second projection, she wipes her face with her hand to reveal her face underneath. By exploring the notion of masking identity, Haleh focused on the themes of alienation and transformation of one's self.

== Press ==
Jamali was interviewed by the press, including Shargh newspaper during her exhibition in the Atbin gallery in 2005, Voice of America's Persian News Network (VOA) (Shabahang program) in 2010, Kahkeshan TV during her exhibition as a part of Edinburgh Iranian Festival in 2011, and Jadid Online and BBC Radio Scotland in 2012.

== Exhibitions ==
=== 2015 ===
- ArtvideoKOELN - audiovisual experiences 01, Tenri KulturWerkstatt e.V. Cologne, Germany
- F for Female, Festival Miden, DAF (Festival of Deviant Arts), Geneva, Switzerland
- F for Female, International Women's Day, Festival Miden, The amphitheater of "Ergatiko Kentro", Kalamata, Greece
- Nietzsche Was A Man, Pori Art Museum, Finland

=== 2014 ===
- Total zero*!,10th Festival Miden, Kalamata's Historic Center, Greece
- Nietzsche Was A Man, Malmö Konsthall museum, C-salen, Sweden

=== 2013 ===
- 26th Festival Les Instants Vidéo, Friche la Belle de Mai, Marseille, France
- Nietzsche Was A Man, VideoBabel, Peruvian; North American Cultural Institute of Cusco, Peru
- FILE Media Art 2013, FIESP Cultural Centre, São Paulo, Brazil
- Nietzsche Was A Man, FONLAD Digital Art Festival, Coimbra, Portugal
- Nietzsche Was A Man, Museo Ex-Teresa Arte Actual, Mexico City, Mexico
- Muslima, International Museum of Women, curated by Samina Ali
- That Person Who Is Your Creation, Asian Arts Initiative, Philadelphia-USA
- I Had Never Seen A Woman Conduct An Orchestra, The Market Studios Gallery, Dublin, Republic of Ireland
- Borders, Edinburgh Iranian festival, Arts complex, group show, Edinburgh, UK (Curated by Haleh Jamali)
- TOMS Art of Giving, Whitespace Gallery, Charity exhibition, Edinburgh, UK

=== 2012 ===
- PPF festival, Unit24 Gallery, group show, London, UK
- 25th Festival Les Instants Vidéo, group show, Marseille, France
- Nuit Blanch, Arta Gallery, group show, Toronto, Canada
- Anatomy #2, Summerhall, group show, Edinburgh, UK
- Art Today Association, Center for Contemporary Art, 2012 Facade Video Festival, group show, Old Town of Plovdiv, Bulgaria
- Trees of Life, Mural painting, Paradise Restored exhibition, commissioned by Royal Botanic Garden Edinburgh, Edinburgh, UK
- 50/50, Queen Gallery, Toronto, Canada
- The Venice Art Night, Arte Laguna Prize, Telecom Future Centre, Venice, Italy
- Artist Wanted, Art Takes Times Square billboard, NY, USA
- |FAT| Fashion Art Toronto Festival, multi-arts event, group show, Toronto, Canada
- Finalist Exhibition of Arte Laguna Prize, Nappe of Arsenale, group show, Venice, Italy

=== 2011 ===
- HB55 Räume der Kunst, FACES/PLACES/SPACES, group show, Berlin, Germany
- Arts complex, Pose, Edinburgh Fringe festival, solo show, Edinburgh, UK
- Out of the Blue, Art of Leith Exhibition - Leith Festival '11, Multi arts space, group show, Edinburgh, UK
- Propeller Centre for the Visual Arts, Here and There, group show, Toronto, Canada
- Out of the Blue, Face Off, Multi arts space, Edinburgh Iranian festival, group show, Edinburgh, UK

=== 2010 ===
- Newheaven exhibition space, Neither here nor there, group show, Edinburgh, UK

=== 2009 ===
- Patriothhall Gallery, Pause, group show, Edinburgh, UK
- Collective Gallery, Stand by, group show, Edinburgh, UK

=== 2007 ===
- La Viande Gallery, Proof (?) of Identity, group show, London, UK
- 2002-05 Iran
- Atbin Gallery, solo show, Tehran, Iran
- Daryabeygi gallery, solo show, Tehran, Iran
- Wall+House+Painting
- Site specific work, group show, Tehran, Iran
- Elaheh gallery, group show, Tehran, Iran

== Awards ==
- 6° International Arte Laguna Prize, Shortlisted, Nappe of Arsenale of Venice, Italy, 2012
- Arts Education in Practice Professional Development Award, SQA, Glasgow, UK, 2008
