= Sequoia National Park =

National park in California, United States

- IUCN category II (national park)
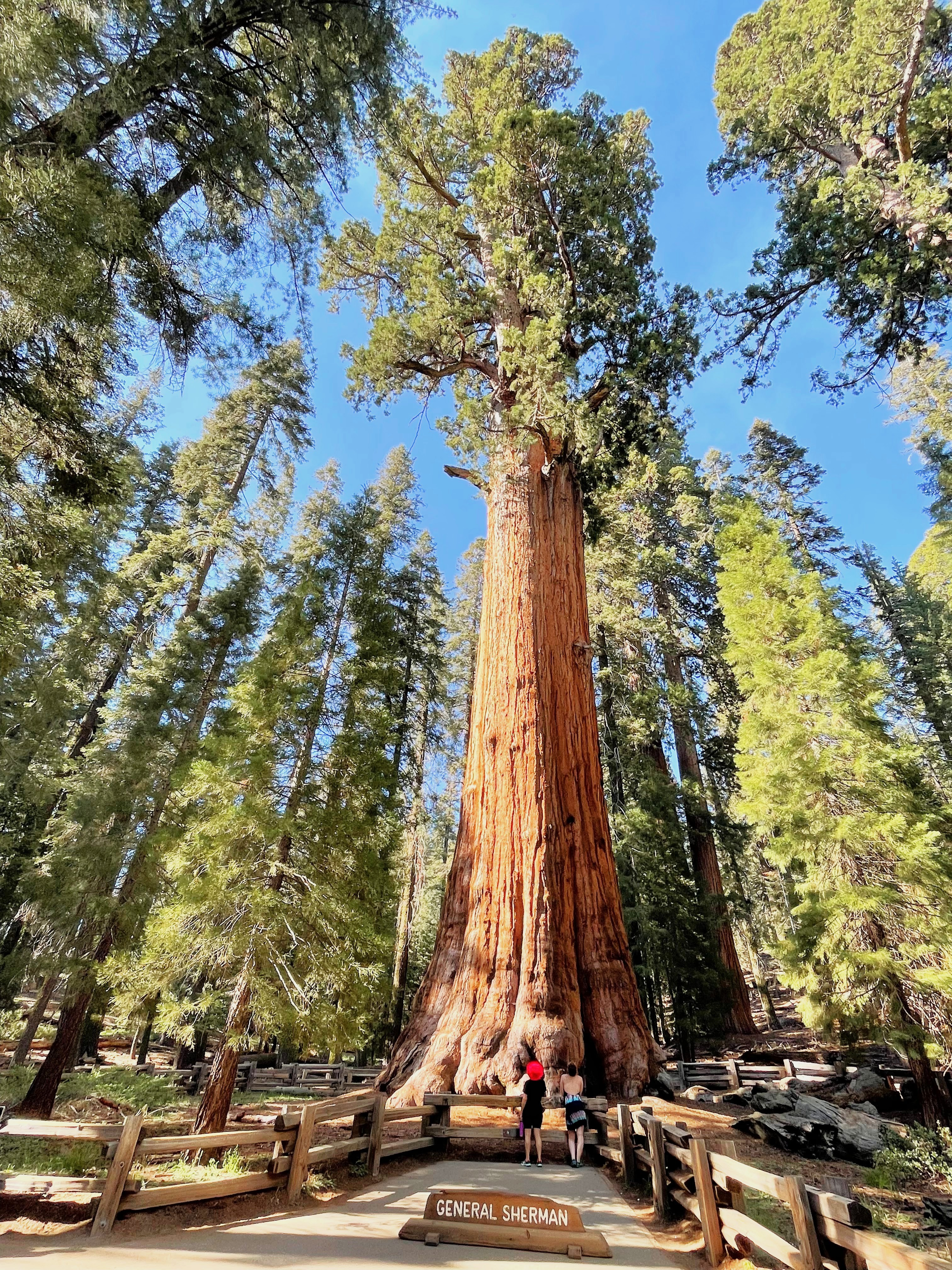
- The General Sherman Tree, the largest tree in the world (measured by volume), in 2022
- Interactive map of Sequoia National Park
- Location: Tulare County, California, United States
- Nearest city: Visalia, California
- Coordinates: 36°33′53″N 118°46′22″W
- Area: 404,064 acres (1,635.19 km^{2})
- Established: September 25, 1890; 136 years ago
- Visitors: 1,153,198 (in 2022)
- Governing body: National Park Service
- Website: nps.gov/seki

Sequoia National Park is a national park of the United States in the southern Sierra Nevada east of Visalia, California. The park was established on September 25, 1890, and today protects 404,064 acres (631 sq mi; 163,519 ha; 1,635 km^{2}) of forested mountainous terrain. Encompassing a vertical relief of nearly 13,000 feet (4,000 m), the park contains the highest point in the contiguous United States, Mount Whitney, at 14,505 feet (4,421 m) above sea level. The park is south of, and contiguous with, Kings Canyon National Park; both parks are administered by the National Park Service together as Sequoia and Kings Canyon National Parks. UNESCO designated the areas as Sequoia-Kings Canyon Biosphere Reserve in 1976.

The park is notable for its giant sequoia trees, including the General Sherman Tree, the largest tree on Earth by volume. The General Sherman Tree grows in the Giant Forest, which contains five of the ten largest trees in the world. The Giant Forest is connected by the Generals Highway to Kings Canyon National Park's General Grant Grove, home of the General Grant Tree among other giant sequoias. The park's giant sequoia forests are part of 202,430 acres (316 sq mi; 81,921 ha; 819 km^{2}) of old-growth forests shared by Sequoia and Kings Canyon National Parks. The parks preserve a landscape that was the ancestral homelands of the Monache (Western Mono), the Tubatulabal, the Owens Valley Paiute, the Yokuts, and the Shoshone (Newe) tribes prior to Euro-American settlement.

== Front country ==
Many park visitors enter Sequoia National Park through its southern entrance near the town of Three Rivers at Ash Mountain at 1,700 ft (520 m) elevation. The lower elevations around Ash Mountain contain the only National Park Service-protected California Foothills ecosystem, consisting of blue oak woodlands, foothills chaparral, grasslands, yucca plants, and steep, mild river valleys. Seasonal weather results in a changing landscape throughout the foothills with hot summer yielding an arid landscape while spring and winter rains result in blossoming wildflowers and lush greens. The region is also home to abundant wildlife: bobcats, foxes, ground squirrels, rattlesnakes, and mule deer are commonly seen in this area, and more rarely, reclusive mountain lions and the Pacific fisher are seen as well. The last California grizzly was killed in this park in 1922 (at Horse Corral Meadow). The California Black Oak is a key transition species between the chaparral and higher elevation conifer forest.

At higher elevations in the front country, between 5,500 and 9,000 feet (1,700 and 2,700 m) in elevation, the landscape becomes montane forest-dominated coniferous belt. Found here are Ponderosa, Jeffrey, sugar, and lodgepole pine trees, as well as abundant white and red fir. Found here too are the giant sequoia trees, the most massive living single-stem trees on Earth. Between the trees, spring and summer snowmelts sometimes fan out to form lush, though delicate, meadows. In this region, visitors often see mule deer, Douglas squirrels, and American black bears, which sometimes break into unattended cars to eat food left by careless visitors. There are plans to reintroduce the bighorn sheep to this park.

== Back country ==
The vast majority of the park is road-less wilderness; no road crosses the Sierra Nevada within the park's boundaries. 84 percent of Sequoia and Kings Canyon National Parks is designated wilderness and is accessible only by foot or by horseback. The majority was designated Sequoia-Kings Canyon Wilderness in 1984 and the southwest portion was protected as John Krebs Wilderness in 2009.

== History ==
=== Native Americans ===
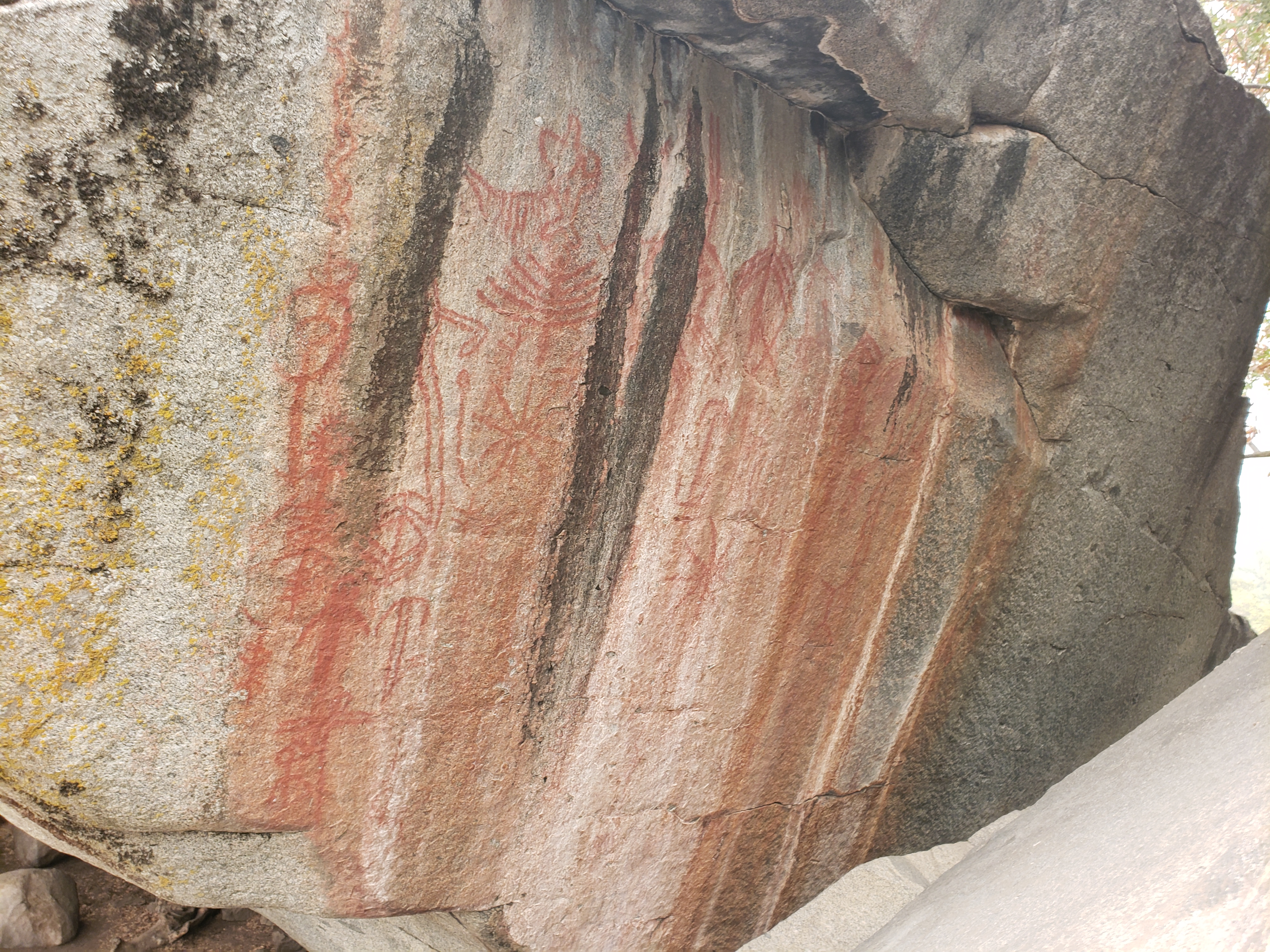
Hospital Rock was a site of healing practices of local tribes before and into the 1800s.

The area which now is Sequoia National Park shows evidence of Native American settlement as early as AD 1000. The area was home to "Monachee" (Western Mono) Native Americans, who resided mainly in the Kaweah River drainage in the Foothills region of what is now the western part of the park, though evidence of seasonal habitation exists as high as the Giant Forest. Members of this tribe were permanent residents of the park, with a population estimate of around 2,000. They lived in groups of one to eight families per village, with a chief who organized ceremonies and helped people in need, and a messenger who assisted the chief and settled disputes in the community. Ceremonies included an annual mourning ceremony to remember the dead, especially those who had died within the past year. During this time, the Western Mono tribe would travel over the high mountain passes to trade with the Owens Valley Paiute and the Yokuts. To this day, pictographs can be found at several sites within the park, notably at Hospital Rock and Potwisha, as well as bedrock mortars used to process acorns, a staple food for the Monachee people.

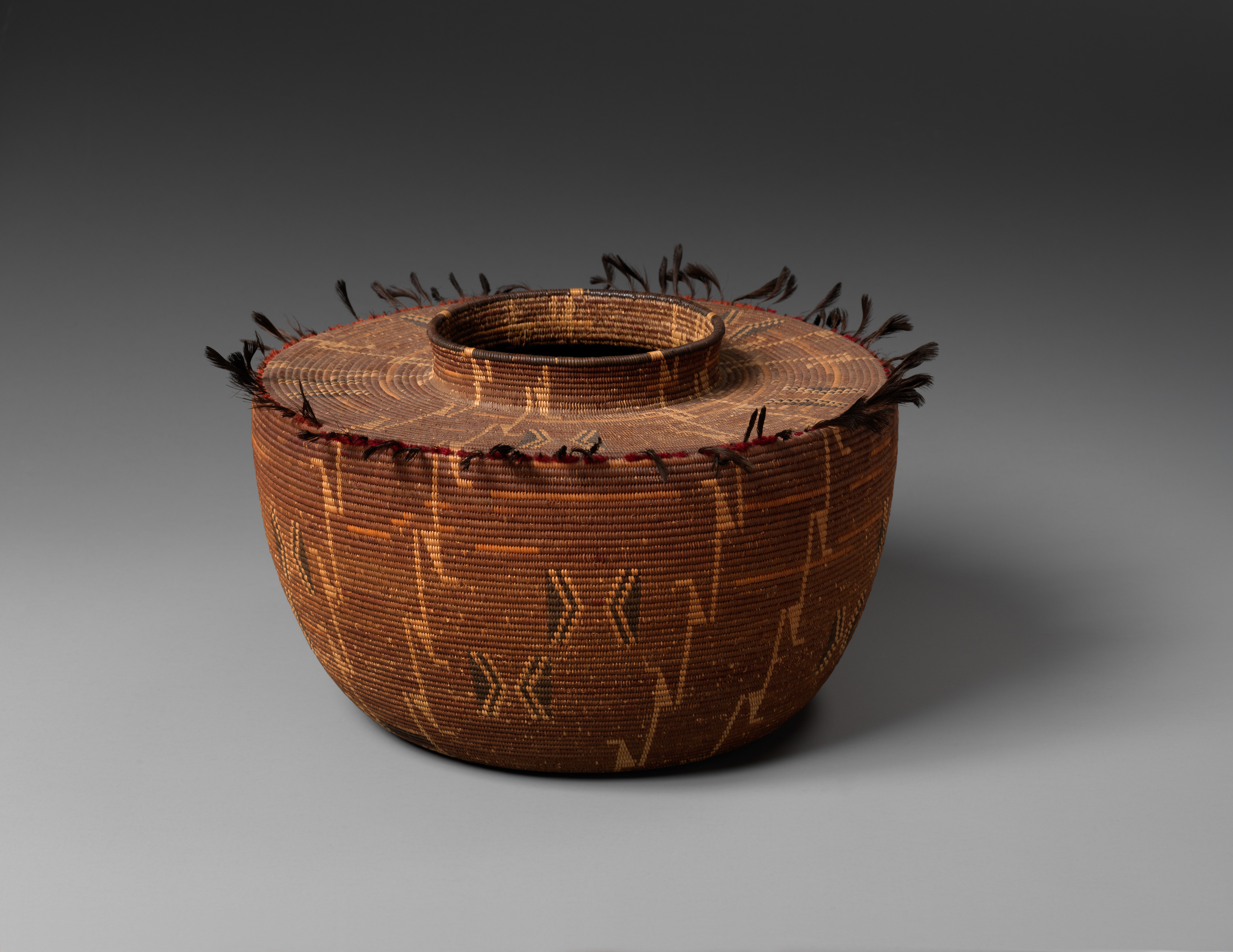
Tübatulabal woven basket made around 1880. Basket weaving is a notable art form for this tribe.

The indigenous Tübatulabal people resided in the eastern part of the area (the Kern River drainage). The Tübatulabal language is in the Uto-Aztecan language family but is distinctive from the languages of other tribes in the region. The tribe was made up of three bands, each having their own chief, which regularly met and intermarried. They were semi-nomadic, moving regularly in warmer months but building more permanent villages in the winter. These villages included dwellings for two to six families and supply storage huts built each fall. Their diet was made up mainly of acorns, pine nuts, and fish, and also included berries, seeds, plants, and local game. They made a wide variety of tools, including baskets, pottery, hunting, trapping, and fishing materials, sewing supplies, and musical instruments.

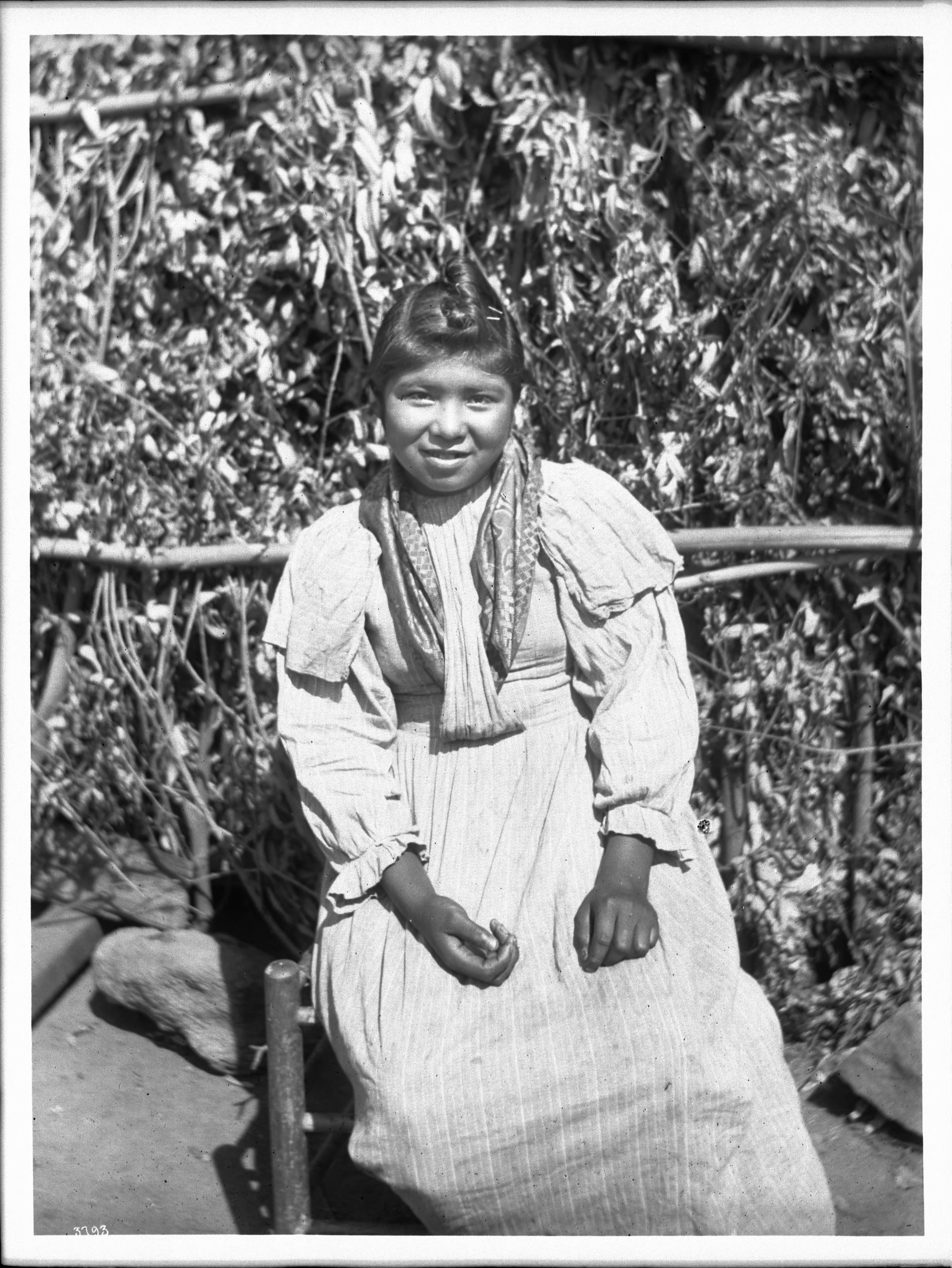
A young Yokut girl, on the Tule River Reservation, ca.1903

The Yokuts inhabited the San Joaquin Valley west of the park, and up into the foothills of the Sierra Nevada range on the modern day park land. Their society was organized into about fifty groups, each with their own chief and territory. According to their customs, a married couple would initially spend one year living with the woman's parents, and then would move into a home near the man's parents. Swimming was a popular activity, with teenagers regularly going to swim on winter nights for "toughening". Crafted items made by the tribe were numerous and included baskets, trapping and fishing equipment, rafts, ropes, ovens, stone tools, and pottery. They traded with the Monachee people as well as with the Miwok Native Americans who lived north of them. In the modern day, many Yokuts live on the Tule River Reservation or the Santa Rosa Rancheria, with tribal council governments. A small number still live in the foothills of the Sierra Nevadas near their ancestral territories, but none reside within park boundaries.

Other Native American peoples within the park included the Owens Valley Paiute, who inhabited the area east of Sequoia National Park, and the eastern slopes of the Sierra Nevada within the modern park boundaries. The tribe is often misassociated with other neighboring tribes because of their linguistic similarities with the Mono people and their cultural similarities to the Northern Paiutes in Nevada. The Owens Valley Paiute were a hunter-gatherer society who were also skilled in fishing and in irrigation techniques. Additionally, the Shoshone (Newe) people lived to the east of the Sierra Nevadas, as well as in the Great Basin. These people lived in extended family groups, each of which had a distinctive home area. Families chose a name for themselves based on geographical or cultural features specific to them, and the people named themselves the Newe as a whole. The name Shoshone was given to them by early white explorers in the 1820s. To this day, many of the Shoshone in the region live on Rancherias together with members of the Owens Valley Paiute, including the Bishop, Big Pine, and Lone Pine rancherias. The two tribes also live together in the Fort Independence Reservation. Together, they have joint tribal councils governing at each of these locations.

=== European settlement ===
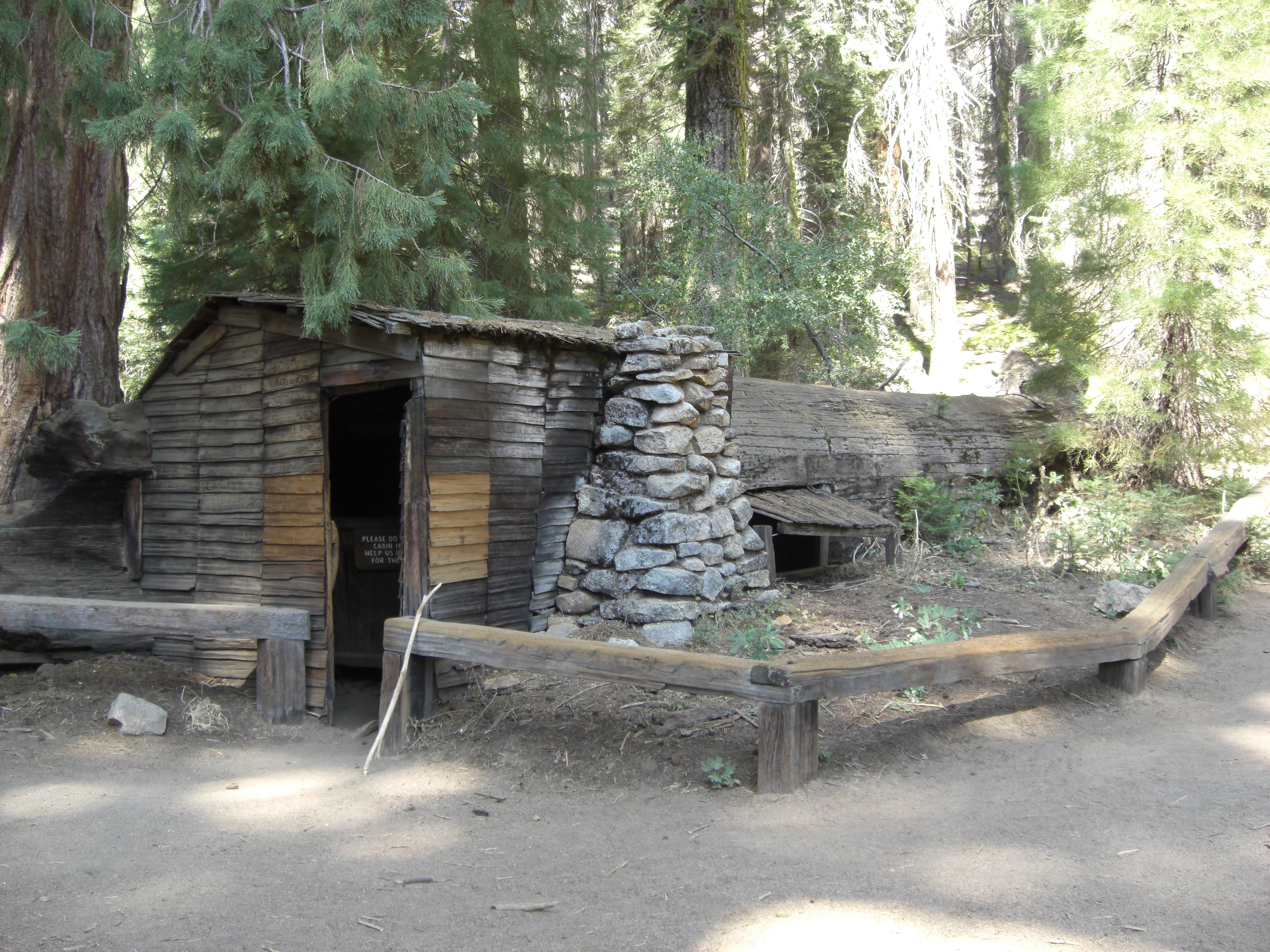
Tharp's Log, a cabin formed out of a hollowed-out giant sequoia log

The first European settler to homestead in the area was Hale Tharp, who built a home out of a hollowed-out fallen giant sequoia log in the Giant Forest next to Log Meadow. Tharp arrived in 1858 to the region and encountered several groups of Native Americans, the largest being around 600 with several other smaller groups found at higher elevations. After becoming friendly with the Western Mono tribe, Tharp was shown the Giant Forest Sequoia Grove. After his settlement, more settlers came around 1860.

Shortly thereafter - between 1860 and 1863, epidemics of smallpox, measles, and scarlet fever killed the majority of the Native Americans living in the area. After this, the rest of the Native Americans were forcibly removed from the largest campsite (Hospital Rock) by 1865. During their time in the area, the Monachee used periodic fire burning to aid in hunting and agriculture. This technique played an important role in the ecology of the region and allowed for a "natural" vegetation cover development. After they left, Tharp and other settlers allowed sheep and cattle to graze the meadow, while at the same time maintaining a respect for the grandeur of the forest and led early battles against logging in the area. From time to time, Tharp received visits from John Muir, who would stay at Tharp's log cabin. Tharp's Log can still be visited today in its original location in the Giant Forest.

Sequoia National Park
- Long title: An Act to set apart a certain tract of land in the State of California as a public park.
- Enacted by: the 51st United States Congress
- Effective: September 25, 1890

Citations
- Public law: Pub. L. 51–926
- Statutes at Large: 26 Stat. 478

Codification
- Titles amended: Title 16—Conservation
- U.S.C. sections created: 16 U.S.C. § 41; 16 U.S.C. § 43

Legislative history
- Introduced in the House as H.R. 11570 by William Vandever (R–CA) on July 28, 1890; Committee consideration by House Public Lands; Passed the House on August 23, 1890 (unanimous consent); Passed the Senate on September 8, 1890 (unanimous consent); Signed into law by President Benjamin Harrison on September 25, 1890

Tharp's attempts to conserve the giant sequoias were at first met with only limited success. In the 1880s, white settlers seeking to create a utopian society founded the Kaweah Colony, which sought economic success in trading Sequoia timber. Giant Sequoia trees, unlike their coast redwood relatives, were later discovered to splinter easily and therefore were ill-suited to timber harvesting, though thousands of trees were felled before logging operations finally ceased.

=== Park status ===
President Benjamin Harrison ultimately signed legislation that established the Sequoia National Park on September 25, 1890, becoming the second national park established in the United States, and ending logging in the area.

=== Buffalo Soldiers ===
Another consequence of the Giant Forest becoming Sequoia National Park was the shift in park employment. Prior to the incorporation by the National Park Service, the park was managed by US army troops of the 24th Regiment of Infantry and the 9th Regiment of Cavalry, better known as the Buffalo Soldiers. These segregated troops, founded in 1866, were African-American men from the South, an invaluable demographic to the military with the lowest rates of desertion. The Buffalo Soldiers completed park infrastructure projects as well as park management duties, helping to shape the role of the modern-day park ranger. The Buffalo Soldiers rose to this position due to a lack of funding for the park which led to an inability to hire civilians.

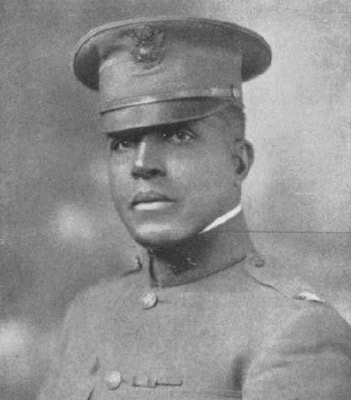
Charles Young, the third African-American graduate of West Point and the first Black U.S. National Park Service superintendent, led the cavalries of Buffalo Soldiers in the Sequoia and General Grant Parks.

The third African-American West Point graduate, Captain Charles Young led the cavalries of Buffalo Soldiers in the Sequoia and General Grant Parks. Young landed this post as a result of the segregation rampant throughout the Army: as a black man, he was not permitted to head any combat units. He led by delegating park infrastructure projects, hosting tourists and politicians, and setting a standard of a strong work ethic into his men. Young was also a prominent figure regarding the early conservation of Sequoia National Park. He greenlighted the dedication of trees in honor of prominent figures as a means of promoting their preservation. One such example is the Redwood dedicated to the escaped slave and activist, Booker T Washington. Young also argued to the Secretary of the Interior that the lack of enforcement of forest protection laws allowed the detrimental practices of logging and the popular tourist hobby of carving names into the redwoods to continue.

=== Sierra Club ===
An expansions occurred in 1978, when grassroots efforts, spearheaded by the Sierra Club, fought off attempts by the Walt Disney Company to purchase a high-alpine former mining site south of the park for use as a ski resort. This site known as Mineral King was annexed to the park. Its name dates back to early 1873 when the miners in the area formed the Mineral King Mining District. Mineral King is the highest-elevation developed site within the park and a popular destination for backpackers.

The national park was partially closed in September 2020 due to the SQF Complex Fire, and fully closed in mid-September through mid-December 2021 due to the KNP Complex Fire.

== Climate ==
According to the Köppen climate classification system, Sequoia National Park encompasses five climate types listed here from highest to lowest elevation; Tundra (ET), Mediterranean-influenced Subarctic climate (Dsc), Mediterranean-influenced warm-summer Humid continental climate (Dsb), Warm-summer Mediterranean climate (Csb), and Hot-summer Mediterranean climate (Csa). Precipitation also decreases with elevation. According to the United States Department of Agriculture, the Plant Hardiness zone at Giant Forest Visitor Center (6,444 ft (1,964 m)) is 8a with an average annual extreme minimum temperature of 12.0 °F (−11.1 °C).

Climate data for Lodgepole, California, 1991–2020 normals, extremes 1968–2021, elev: 6,735 ft (2,053 m)
| Month | Jan | Feb | Mar | Apr | May | Jun | Jul | Aug | Sep | Oct | Nov | Dec | Year |
|---|---|---|---|---|---|---|---|---|---|---|---|---|---|
| Record high °F (°C) | 65 (18) | 65 (18) | 66 (19) | 73 (23) | 85 (29) | 89 (32) | 92 (33) | 89 (32) | 91 (33) | 81 (27) | 67 (19) | 60 (16) | 92 (33) |
| Mean maximum °F (°C) | 50.1 (10.1) | 53.8 (12.1) | 58.7 (14.8) | 66.1 (18.9) | 73.5 (23.1) | 80.9 (27.2) | 85.4 (29.7) | 84.5 (29.2) | 81.0 (27.2) | 72.3 (22.4) | 60.6 (15.9) | 50.9 (10.5) | 86.9 (30.5) |
| Mean daily maximum °F (°C) | 39.2 (4.0) | 41.0 (5.0) | 45.3 (7.4) | 50.0 (10.0) | 58.4 (14.7) | 68.4 (20.2) | 76.1 (24.5) | 75.9 (24.4) | 70.0 (21.1) | 58.9 (14.9) | 46.6 (8.1) | 37.3 (2.9) | 55.6 (13.1) |
| Daily mean °F (°C) | 28.3 (−2.1) | 29.7 (−1.3) | 33.6 (0.9) | 37.8 (3.2) | 45.7 (7.6) | 54.0 (12.2) | 61.0 (16.1) | 60.0 (15.6) | 54.6 (12.6) | 45.0 (7.2) | 35.0 (1.7) | 27.3 (−2.6) | 42.7 (5.9) |
| Mean daily minimum °F (°C) | 17.4 (−8.1) | 18.4 (−7.6) | 21.8 (−5.7) | 25.7 (−3.5) | 33.1 (0.6) | 39.5 (4.2) | 45.9 (7.7) | 44.1 (6.7) | 39.2 (4.0) | 31.1 (−0.5) | 23.4 (−4.8) | 17.2 (−8.2) | 29.7 (−1.3) |
| Mean minimum °F (°C) | 3.5 (−15.8) | 5.5 (−14.7) | 7.8 (−13.4) | 13.2 (−10.4) | 23.1 (−4.9) | 29.6 (−1.3) | 37.8 (3.2) | 36.3 (2.4) | 29.9 (−1.2) | 21.8 (−5.7) | 11.8 (−11.2) | 4.2 (−15.4) | −0.8 (−18.2) |
| Record low °F (°C) | −10 (−23) | −12 (−24) | −2 (−19) | −1 (−18) | 9 (−13) | 23 (−5) | 28 (−2) | 28 (−2) | 19 (−7) | 1 (−17) | −3 (−19) | −16 (−27) | −16 (−27) |
| Average precipitation inches (mm) | 8.72 (221) | 7.87 (200) | 6.42 (163) | 3.24 (82) | 2.05 (52) | 0.69 (18) | 0.61 (15) | 0.15 (3.8) | 0.65 (17) | 2.27 (58) | 3.65 (93) | 6.87 (174) | 43.19 (1,096.8) |
| Average snowfall inches (cm) | 42.4 (108) | 61.5 (156) | 37.1 (94) | 22.2 (56) | 6.0 (15) | 1.1 (2.8) | 0.0 (0.0) | 0.0 (0.0) | 0.0 (0.0) | 3.4 (8.6) | 11.7 (30) | 35.0 (89) | 220.4 (559.4) |
| Average extreme snow depth inches (cm) | 49.9 (127) | 66.9 (170) | 73.6 (187) | 53.1 (135) | 15.3 (39) | 1.7 (4.3) | 0.0 (0.0) | 0.0 (0.0) | 0.0 (0.0) | 2.4 (6.1) | 10.3 (26) | 30.3 (77) | 79.9 (203) |
| Average precipitation days (≥ 0.01 in) | 8.8 | 10.0 | 9.5 | 7.7 | 5.7 | 2.4 | 2.1 | 1.5 | 2.2 | 3.9 | 5.6 | 8.2 | 67.6 |
| Average snowy days (≥ 0.01 in) | 7.7 | 8.4 | 7.4 | 4.6 | 2.0 | 0.3 | 0.0 | 0.0 | 0.0 | 0.9 | 3.7 | 6.6 | 41.6 |
Source 1: NOAA
Source 2: National Weather Service

Climate data for Giant Forest Visitor Center, Sequoia National Park. Elev: 5,646 ft (1,721 m)
| Month | Jan | Feb | Mar | Apr | May | Jun | Jul | Aug | Sep | Oct | Nov | Dec | Year |
|---|---|---|---|---|---|---|---|---|---|---|---|---|---|
| Mean daily maximum °F (°C) | 47.2 (8.4) | 47.7 (8.7) | 50.5 (10.3) | 55.0 (12.8) | 63.8 (17.7) | 72.4 (22.4) | 80.1 (26.7) | 80.3 (26.8) | 74.5 (23.6) | 64.3 (17.9) | 53.0 (11.7) | 45.9 (7.7) | 61.3 (16.3) |
| Daily mean °F (°C) | 38.0 (3.3) | 38.2 (3.4) | 40.7 (4.8) | 44.6 (7.0) | 52.5 (11.4) | 60.6 (15.9) | 68.4 (20.2) | 67.7 (19.8) | 62.3 (16.8) | 53.5 (11.9) | 43.8 (6.6) | 37.9 (3.3) | 50.8 (10.4) |
| Mean daily minimum °F (°C) | 28.9 (−1.7) | 28.8 (−1.8) | 31.0 (−0.6) | 34.3 (1.3) | 41.3 (5.2) | 48.8 (9.3) | 56.7 (13.7) | 55.2 (12.9) | 50.2 (10.1) | 42.6 (5.9) | 34.6 (1.4) | 29.8 (−1.2) | 40.2 (4.6) |
| Average precipitation inches (mm) | 7.59 (193) | 7.16 (182) | 6.81 (173) | 3.61 (92) | 1.78 (45) | 0.67 (17) | 0.33 (8.4) | 0.14 (3.6) | 0.71 (18) | 1.96 (50) | 4.32 (110) | 6.11 (155) | 41.19 (1,046) |
| Average relative humidity (%) | 48.3 | 61.7 | 64.9 | 61.5 | 56.5 | 47.3 | 41.7 | 38.6 | 38.1 | 42.6 | 49.3 | 50.4 | 50.0 |
| Average dew point °F (°C) | 20.2 (−6.6) | 26.2 (−3.2) | 29.8 (−1.2) | 32.2 (0.1) | 37.5 (3.1) | 40.4 (4.7) | 44.2 (6.8) | 41.6 (5.3) | 36.4 (2.4) | 31.3 (−0.4) | 26.0 (−3.3) | 21.1 (−6.1) | 32.3 (0.2) |
Source: PRISM Climate Group

Climate data for Ash Mountain, California, 1991–2020 normals, extremes 1927–2021
| Month | Jan | Feb | Mar | Apr | May | Jun | Jul | Aug | Sep | Oct | Nov | Dec | Year |
|---|---|---|---|---|---|---|---|---|---|---|---|---|---|
| Record high °F (°C) | 84 (29) | 85 (29) | 89 (32) | 97 (36) | 106 (41) | 114 (46) | 118 (48) | 116 (47) | 112 (44) | 103 (39) | 94 (34) | 82 (28) | 118 (48) |
| Mean maximum °F (°C) | 72.6 (22.6) | 76.6 (24.8) | 80.4 (26.9) | 87.3 (30.7) | 96.4 (35.8) | 104.6 (40.3) | 108.2 (42.3) | 107.5 (41.9) | 103.9 (39.9) | 95.5 (35.3) | 82.3 (27.9) | 72.6 (22.6) | 109.8 (43.2) |
| Mean daily maximum °F (°C) | 57.6 (14.2) | 60.3 (15.7) | 64.2 (17.9) | 68.9 (20.5) | 78.8 (26.0) | 89.5 (31.9) | 97.1 (36.2) | 96.6 (35.9) | 91.2 (32.9) | 79.1 (26.2) | 65.6 (18.7) | 56.8 (13.8) | 75.5 (24.2) |
| Daily mean °F (°C) | 47.9 (8.8) | 50.4 (10.2) | 53.5 (11.9) | 57.2 (14.0) | 66.3 (19.1) | 75.9 (24.4) | 83.0 (28.3) | 82.3 (27.9) | 76.9 (24.9) | 66.2 (19.0) | 54.7 (12.6) | 47.4 (8.6) | 63.5 (17.5) |
| Mean daily minimum °F (°C) | 38.3 (3.5) | 40.6 (4.8) | 42.8 (6.0) | 45.4 (7.4) | 53.7 (12.1) | 62.4 (16.9) | 69.0 (20.6) | 68.1 (20.1) | 62.5 (16.9) | 53.4 (11.9) | 43.8 (6.6) | 38.0 (3.3) | 51.5 (10.8) |
| Mean minimum °F (°C) | 28.6 (−1.9) | 30.5 (−0.8) | 31.3 (−0.4) | 33.4 (0.8) | 41.1 (5.1) | 47.7 (8.7) | 57.6 (14.2) | 57.8 (14.3) | 50.2 (10.1) | 40.9 (4.9) | 32.5 (0.3) | 27.2 (−2.7) | 24.8 (−4.0) |
| Record low °F (°C) | 18 (−8) | 21 (−6) | 20 (−7) | 25 (−4) | 33 (1) | 38 (3) | 47 (8) | 45 (7) | 40 (4) | 28 (−2) | 20 (−7) | 17 (−8) | 17 (−8) |
| Average precipitation inches (mm) | 4.89 (124) | 4.29 (109) | 4.02 (102) | 2.48 (63) | 1.23 (31) | 0.37 (9.4) | 0.14 (3.6) | 0.02 (0.51) | 0.18 (4.6) | 1.24 (31) | 2.41 (61) | 3.72 (94) | 24.99 (633.11) |
| Average snowfall inches (cm) | 0.1 (0.25) | 0.0 (0.0) | 0.1 (0.25) | 0.0 (0.0) | 0.0 (0.0) | 0.0 (0.0) | 0.0 (0.0) | 0.0 (0.0) | 0.0 (0.0) | 0.0 (0.0) | 0.0 (0.0) | 0.0 (0.0) | 0.2 (0.5) |
| Average precipitation days (≥ 0.01 in) | 9.3 | 10.6 | 9.6 | 6.6 | 4.6 | 1.3 | 0.9 | 0.4 | 1.5 | 3.5 | 6.1 | 8.4 | 62.8 |
| Average snowy days (≥ 0.1 in) | 0.2 | 0.0 | 0.1 | 0.0 | 0.0 | 0.0 | 0.0 | 0.0 | 0.0 | 0.0 | 0.0 | 0.0 | 0.3 |
Source: NOAA

== Geology ==
Sequoia National Park contains a significant portion of the Sierra Nevada. The park's mountainous landscape includes the tallest mountain in the contiguous United States, Mount Whitney, which rises to 14,505 feet (4,421 m) above sea level. The Great Western Divide parallels the Sierran crest and is visible at various places in the park, for example, Mineral King, Moro Rock, and the Giant Forest. Peaks in the Great Western Divide rise to more than 12,000 feet (3,700 m). Deep canyons lie between the mountains, including Tokopah Valley above Lodgepole, Deep Canyon on the Marble Fork of the Kaweah River, and Kern Canyon in the park's backcountry, which is more than 5,000 feet (1,500 m) deep for 30 miles (50 km).

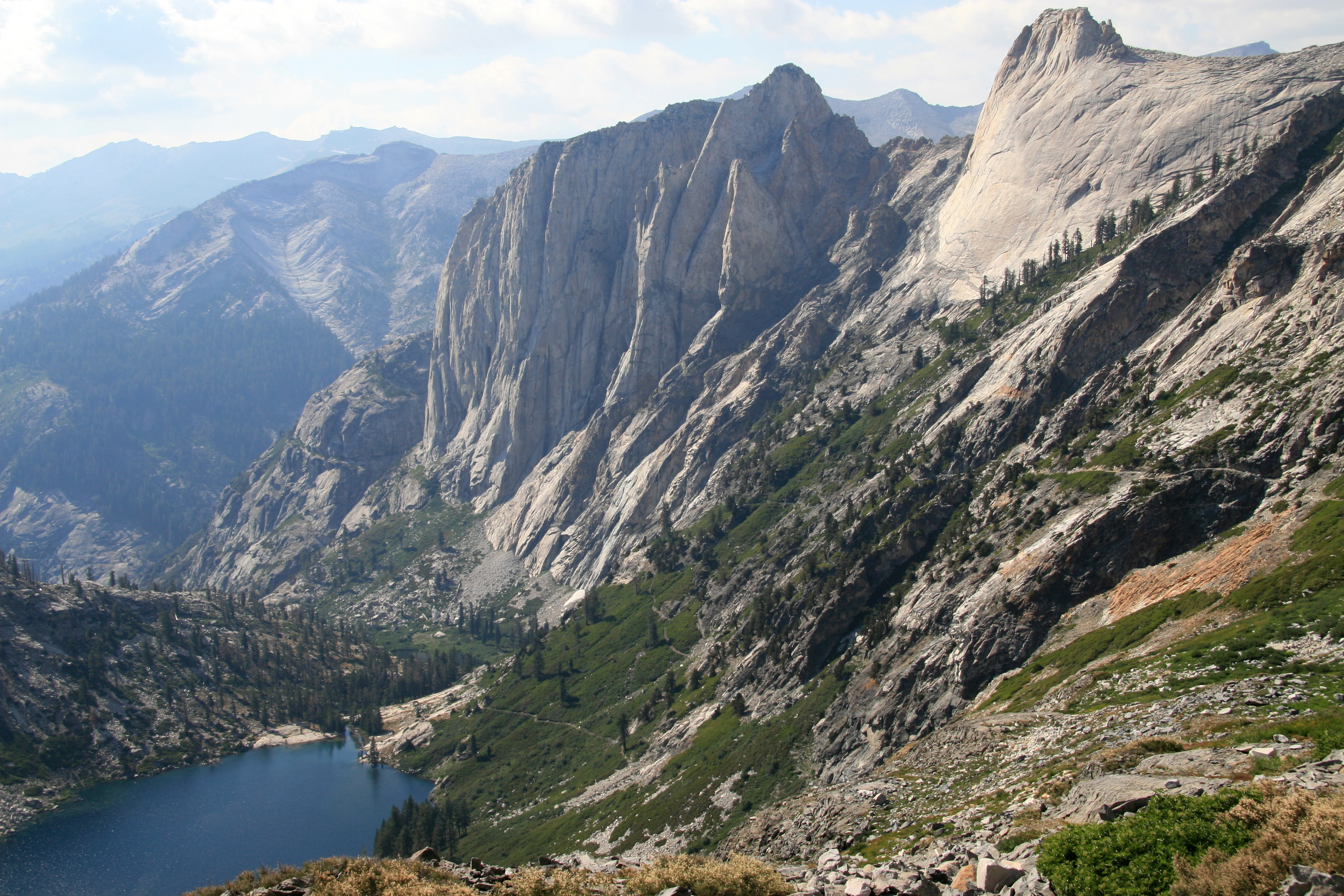
The High Sierra Trail above Hamilton Lake passes over the Great Western Divide

Most of the mountains and canyons in the Sierra Nevada are composed of granitic rocks. These rocks, such as granite, diorite and monzonite, formed when molten rock cooled far beneath the surface of the earth. The molten rock was the result of a geologic process known as subduction. Powerful forces in the earth forced the landmass under the waters of the Pacific Ocean beneath and below an advancing North American Continent. Super-hot water driven from the subducting ocean floor migrated upward and melted rock as it proceeded. This process took place during the Cretaceous Period, 100 million years ago. Granitic rocks have a speckled salt-and-pepper appearance because they contain various minerals including quartz, feldspars and micas. Valhalla, or the Angel Wings, are prominent granitic cliffs that rise above the headwaters of the Middle Fork of the Kaweah River.

The Sierra Nevada is a young mountain range, probably not more than 10 million years old. Forces in the earth, probably associated with the development of the Great Basin, forced the mountains to rise. During the last 10 million years, at least four ice ages have coated the mountains in a thick mantle of ice. Glaciers form and develop during long periods of cool and wet weather. Glaciers move very slowly through the mountains, carving deep valleys and craggy peaks. The extensive history of glaciation within the range and the erosion-resistant nature of the granitic rocks that make up most of the Sierra Nevada have together created a landscape of hanging valleys, waterfalls, craggy peaks, alpine lakes (such as Tulainyo Lake) and glacial canyons.

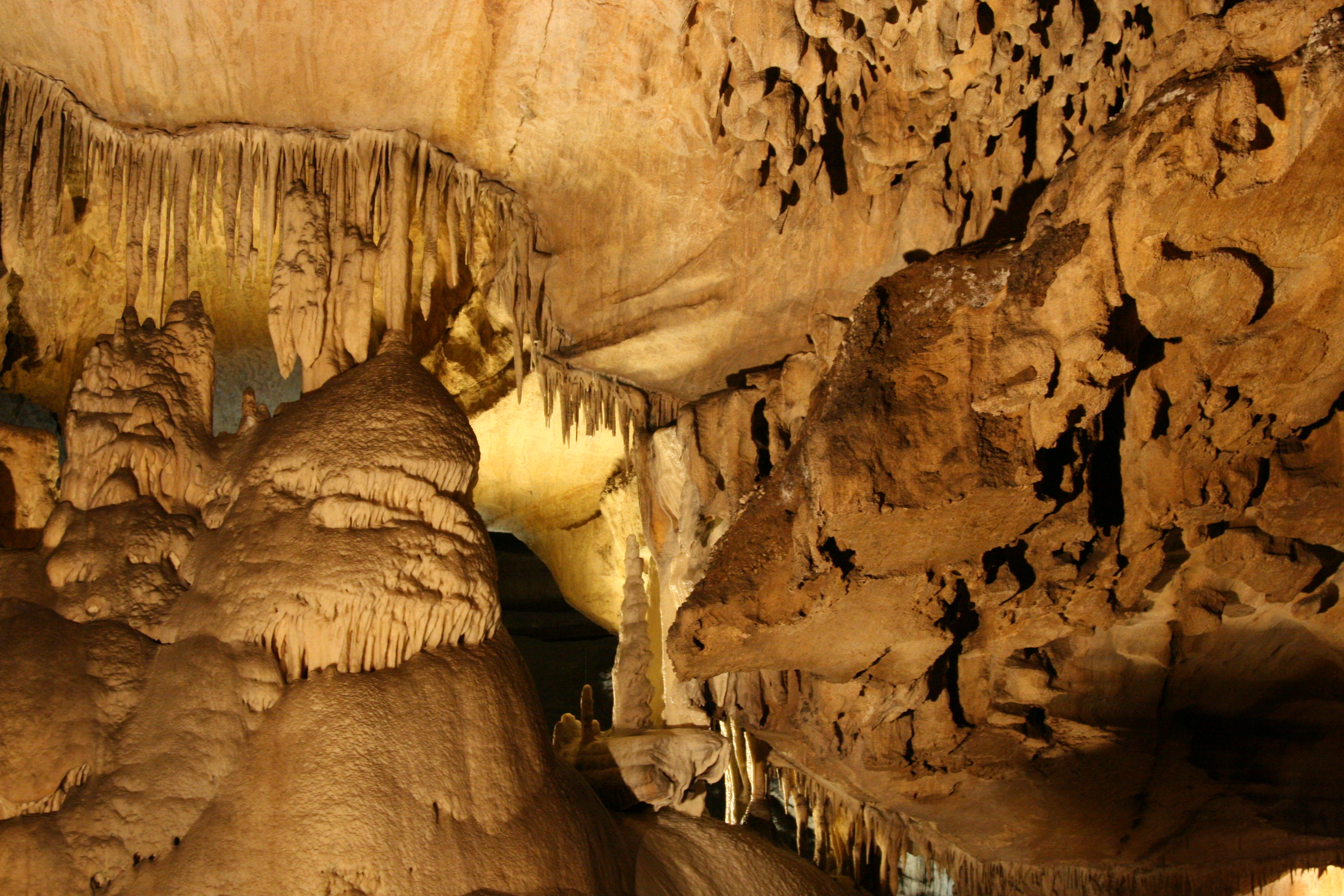
Calcite formations in Crystal Cave

Park caves, like most caves in the Sierra Nevada of California, are mostly solutional caves dissolved from marble. Marble rock is essentially limestone that was metamorphosed by the heat and pressure of the formation and uplift of the Sierra Nevada Batholith. The batholith's rapid uplift over the past 10 million years led to a rapid erosion of the metamorphic rocks in the higher elevations, exposing the granite beneath; therefore, most Sierra Nevada caves are found in the middle and lower elevations (below 7,000 ft or 2,100 m), though some caves are found in the park at elevations as high as 10,000 ft (3,000 m) such as the White Chief cave and Cirque Cave in Mineral King. These caves are carved out of the rock by the abundant seasonal streams in the park. Most of the larger park caves have, or have had, sinking streams running through them.

The park contains more than 270 known caves, including Lilburn Cave which is California's longest cave with nearly 17 miles (27 km) of surveyed passages. The only commercial cave open to park visitors is Crystal Cave, the park's second-longest cave at over 3.4 miles (5.5 km). Crystal Cave was discovered on April 28, 1918, by Alex Medley and Cassius Webster. The cave is a constant 48 °F (9 °C), and is only accessible by guided tour.

Caves are discovered frequently in the park with the most recently discovered major cave being Ursa Minor in August 2006.

== Flora and fauna ==
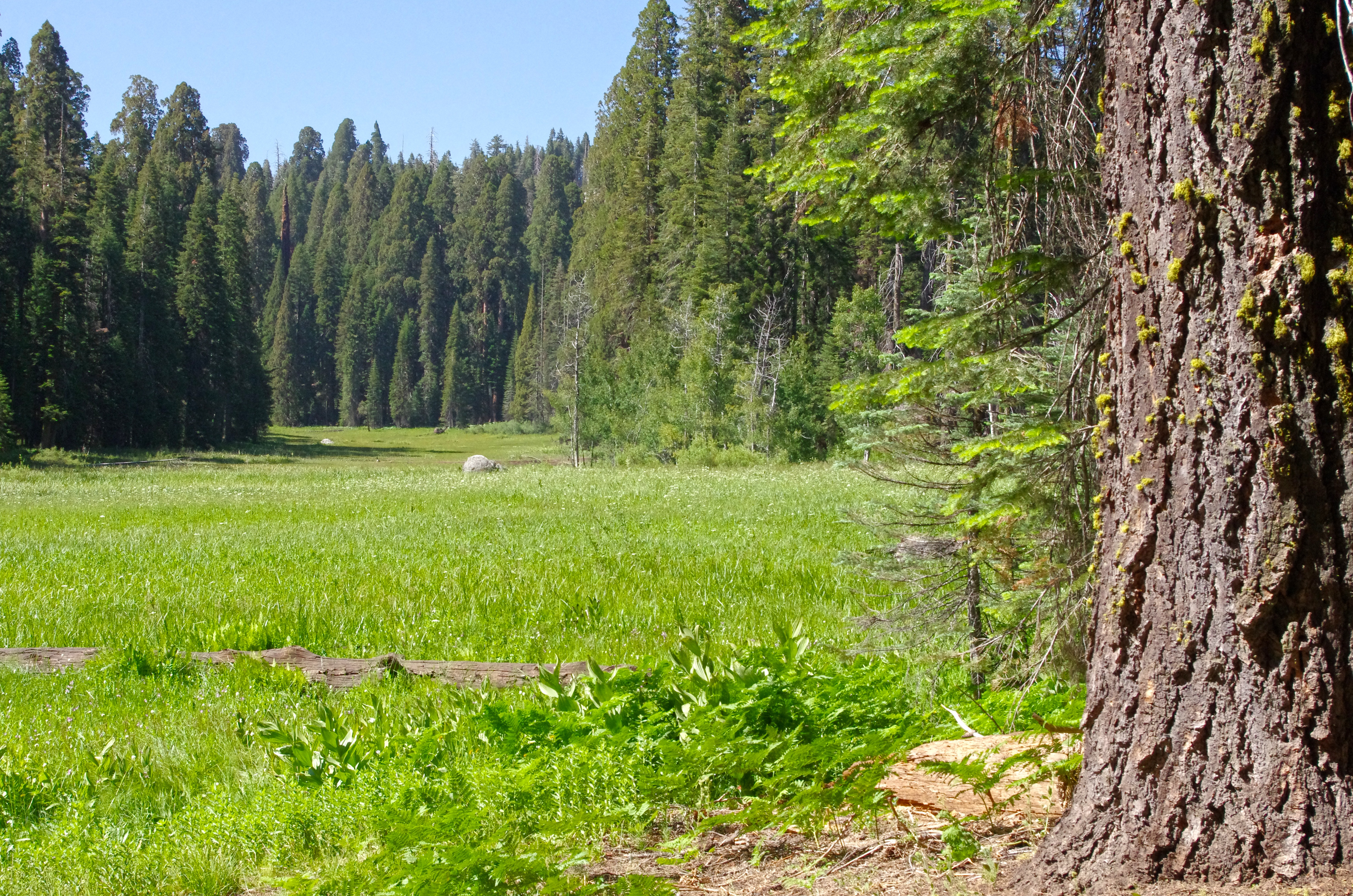
Crescent Meadow in the Giant Forest, called the "Gem of the Sierra" by John Muir

Sequoia National Park encompasses many classifications of ecological zones, with the highest zone consisting of alpine tundra vegetation, then followed by California conifer forests, with chaparral at the lower elevations of the park.

In the early 2000s, lumber company, Sierra Pacific Industries, began creating a living gene bank of trees using seeds harvested from the park.

Animals that inhabit this park are coyote, badger, black bear, bighorn sheep, deer, fox, cougar, eleven species of woodpecker, various species of turtle, three species of owl, opossum, various species of snake, wolverine, beaver, various species of frog, and muskrat.

== Park attractions ==
General Sherman Tree looking up

In addition to hiking, camping, fishing, and backpacking, the following attractions are highlights with many park visitors:

- Sherman Tree Trail is an 0.8-mile-roundtrip paved trail that descends from the parking lot to the base of the General Sherman Tree and meanders through a grove of giant sequoia trees.
- Tunnel Log is a fallen giant sequoia tree in Sequoia National Park. The tree, which measured 275 feet (84 m) tall and 21 feet (6.4 m) in diameter, fell across a park road in 1937 due to natural causes. The following year, a crew cut an 8-foot (2.4 m) tall, 17-foot (5.2 m) wide tunnel through the trunk, making the road passable again.
- The trail to Tokopah Falls starts just beyond the Marble Fork Bridge in Lodgepole Campground. It is an easy 1.7-mile (one way) walk along the Marble Fork of the Kaweah River to the impressive granite cliffs and waterfall of Tokopah Canyon. Tokopah Falls is 1,200 feet (370 meters) high, and is most impressive in early summer.
- Crescent Meadow is a small, sequoia-rimmed meadow in the Giant Forest region of Sequoia National Park. This sierran montane meadow marks the western terminus of the High Sierra Trail, which stretches from the meadow across the Great Western Divide to Mount Whitney. Pioneer Hale Tharp homesteaded in this and nearby Log Meadow. Conservationist John Muir visited this meadow many times and called it the "Gem of the Sierra". The meadow lies at the end of a three-mile paved road, which leaves the Generals Highway near the Giant Forest Museum.
- Moro Rock is a granite dome located in the center of the park, at the head of Moro Creek, between Giant Forest and Crescent Meadow. A 351-step stairway, built in the 1930s by the Civilian Conservation Corps, is cut into and poured onto the rock, so that visitors can hike to the top. The stairway is listed on the National Register of Historic Places. The view from the rock encompasses much of the park, including the Great Western Divide. It has an elevation of 6,725 feet (2,050 m).
- Campgrounds in the park include three in the foothills area: Potwisha (42 sites), Buckeye Flat (28 sites), and South Fork (10 sites). Four campgrounds are at higher, conifer-dominated elevations, ranging from 6,650 to 7,500 feet (2,000 to 2,300 m): Atwell Mill (21 sites), Cold Springs (40 sites), Lodgepole (214 sites), and Dorst Creek (204 sites).
- Giant Forest Museum offers information about giant sequoias and human history in the forest. The historic museum was built in 1928 by architect Gilbert Stanley Underwood.

== In popular culture ==
Apple's macOS Sequoia was named after Sequoia National Park.

== See also ==
- Fauna of the Sierra Nevada
- African-American Heritage Sites
- Bibliography of the Sierra Nevada
- List of giant sequoia groves
- List of national parks of the United States
- List of plants of the Sierra Nevada
- National parks in California
- National Register of Historic Places listings in Sequoia-Kings Canyon National Parks
- Protected areas of the Sierra Nevada
