= Moro Rock =

Granite dome in Sequoia National Park, California

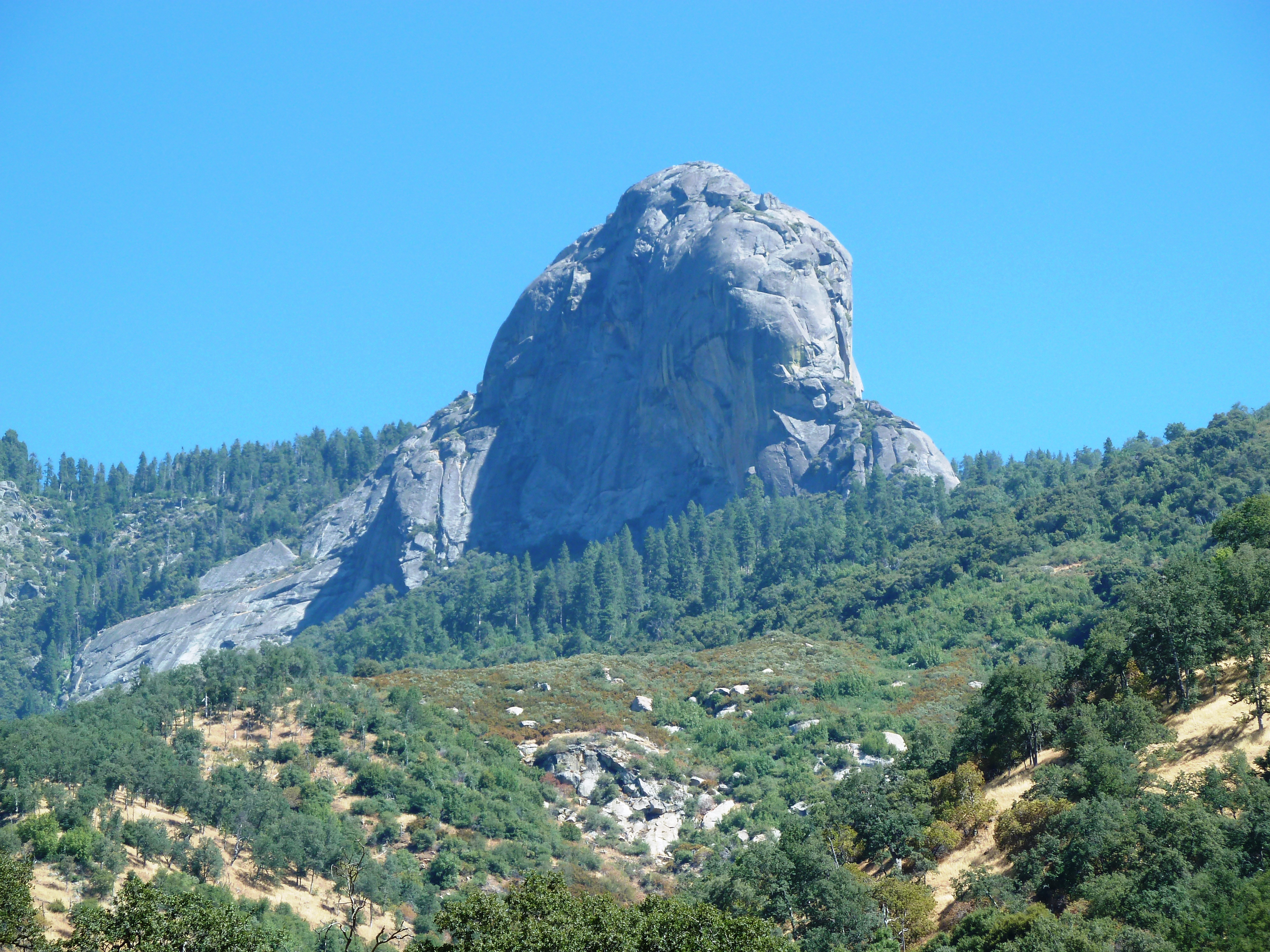
- View of Moro Rock from Potwisha (near Hospital Rock), Sequoia National Park

Highest point
- Elevation: 6,725 ft (2,050 m)
- Prominence: 245 ft (75 m)
- Coordinates: 36°32′39″N 118°45′54″W

Geography
- Location within California Location within the United States
- Location: Sequoia National Park, Tulare County, California, United States
- Parent range: Sierra Nevada
- Topo map: USGS Giant Forest

Geology
- Rock age: Cretaceous
- Mountain type: Granite dome

Climbing
- First ascent: 1861, by Hale Tharp, John Swanson and George Swanson (first recorded ascent by non-natives)
- Easiest route: Hike

Moro Rock is a granite dome rock formation in Sequoia National Park, California, United States. It is located in the center of the park, at the head of Moro Creek, between Giant Forest and Crescent Meadow. A stairway, designed by the National Park Service and built in 1931, is cut into and poured onto the rock, so that visitors can hike to the top. The view from the rock encompasses much of the Park, including the Great Western Divide. Use of this trail is discouraged during thunderstorms and when it is snowing.

The name "Moro Rock" derives from a blue roan mustang of color the Mexicans call moro, owned by one Mr Swanson of Three Rivers in the 1860s.

== Recreation ==
The road to Moro Rock is closed in winter, so visitors need to hike 2 miles to reach the viewpoint. The road is open in summer so the hike is shortened. The 1996 general plan for the park calls for the road to Moro to be closed, and replaced by a shuttle. As of June 2012, the road is open to general traffic only during weekdays; on weekends, the shuttle is running and the road is closed to general traffic. The west face of Moro Rock offers 1,000 vertical feet of cracks and knobs for rock climbing. However, climbing is prohibited during peregrine falcon nesting season on the South and East faces (up to Full Metal Jacket).

== Geology ==
Moro Rock is a dome-shaped granite monolith. Common in the Sierra Nevada, these domes form by exfoliation, the spalling or casting off in scales, plates, or sheets of rock layers on otherwise unjointed granite. Outward expansion of the granite results in exfoliations. Expansion results from load relief; when the overburden that once capped the granite has eroded away, the source of compression is removed and the granite slowly expands. Fractures that form during exfoliation tend to cut corners. This ultimately results in rounded dome-like forms.

== Stairway ==
- Moro Rock Stairway
- U.S. National Register of Historic Places
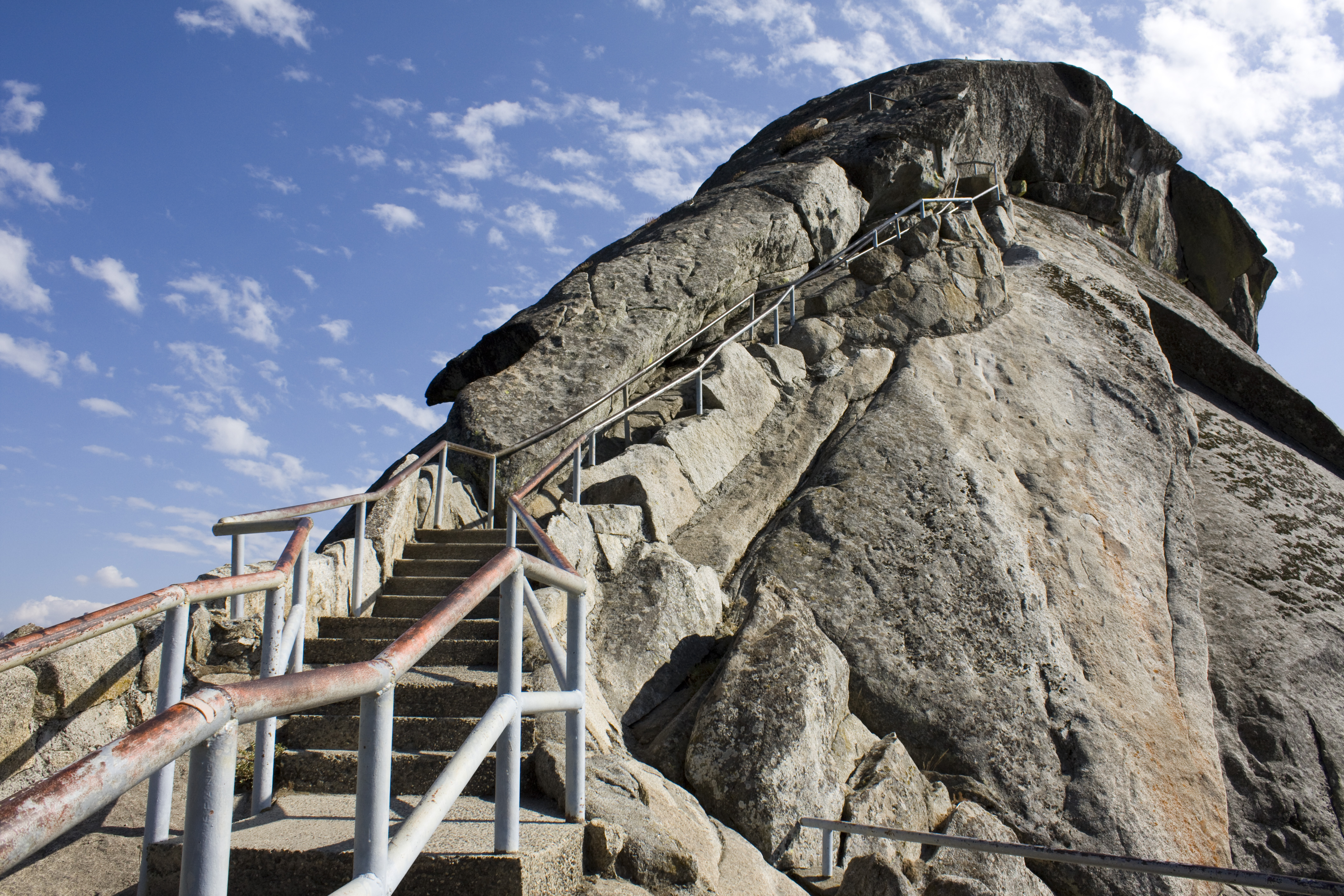
- Built: 1931
- Architect: National Park Service
- NRHP reference No.: 78000283
- Added to NRHP: December 29, 1978

The first stairway leading to the summit of Moro Rock was constructed of wood and installed in 1917. This stairway deteriorated significantly by the late 1920s, and was replaced in 1931 by the present Moro Rock Stairway, built by the Civilian Conservation Corps. Unlike the earlier stairway, the new stairway adopted a design policy of blending with the natural surfaces to the greatest extent possible. The 797-foot-long stairway was designed by National Park Service landscape architect Merel S. Sager and engineer John Diehl, following natural ledges and crevices. It has 400 steps that lead to the summit of Moro Rock. Changes since the original construction have impaired the integrity of the design.
