= Hale Tharp =

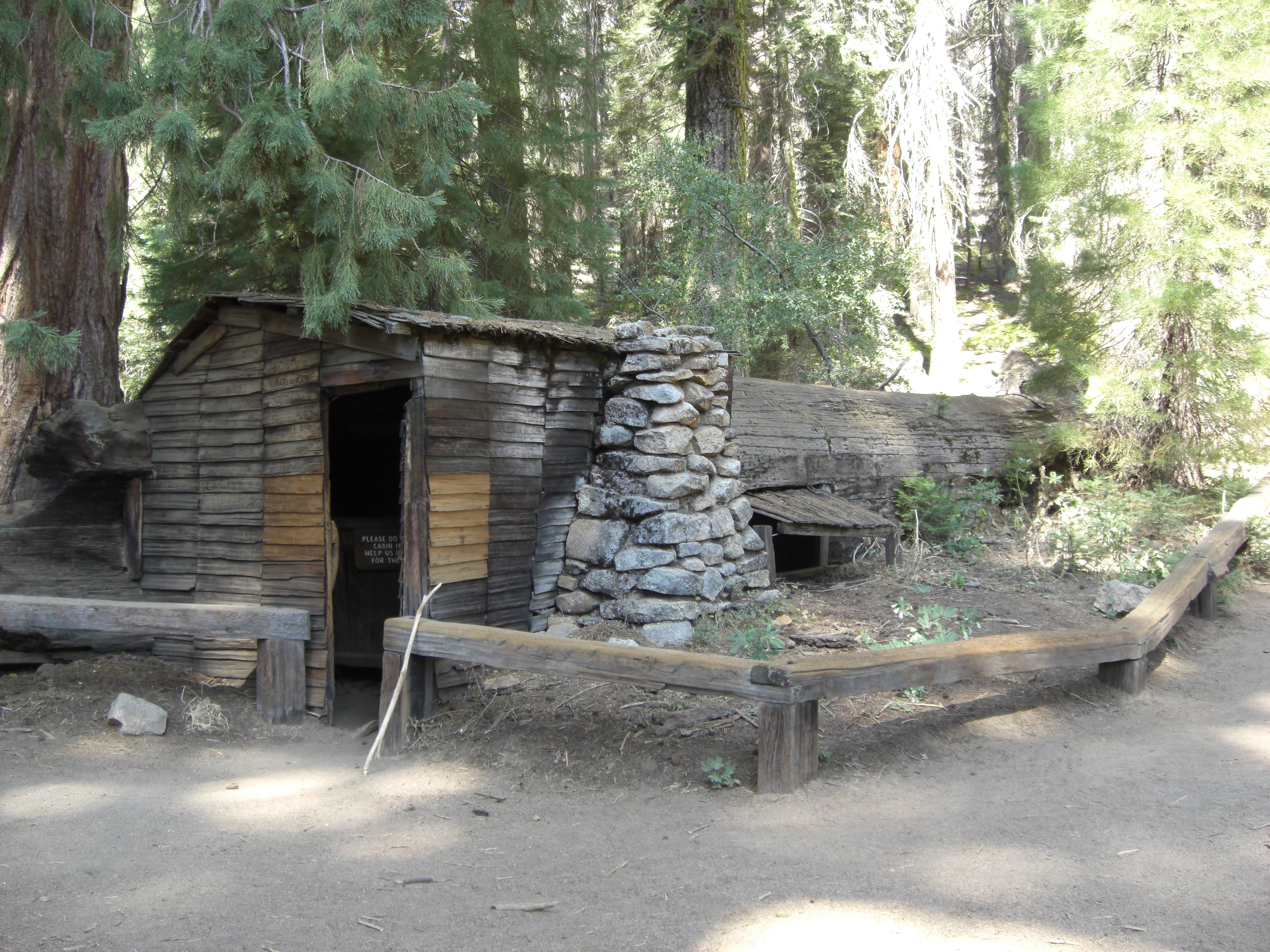
Tharp's log home in Log Meadow

Hale Dixon Tharp was a miner during the California Gold Rush, and the first non-Native American settler to enter Giant Forest, in what is now Sequoia National Park.

== Gold Country ==
Tharp was born in Michigan in 1828. In 1851, a widow from Illinois, Chloe Ann Smith Swanson, hired Tharp to take her and her four sons to California in a covered wagon with two teams of oxen. They settled in Placerville, where Tharp married Swanson. Tharp then began mining in California's Gold Country.

== Sequoia ==
In the summer of 1856, Tharp went to Tulare County to establish a preemption homestead, with the intent to return later to ranch cattle. He built a shake and brush shack near the confluence of the Kaweah River and Horse Creek, east of Visalia and south of Three Rivers. He then returned to Placerville.

Two years later, Tharp and his brother-in-law John Swanson returned to his homestead and built a log cabin and barn, Cattle Cabin. Tharp then sought cattle summer pasturage. Led by the local Yokuts Indians, Tharp "discovered" Crescent Meadow and Log Meadow near the Giant Forest. He claimed grazing rights there for several years.

Tharp's Log is a home Tharp built in a hollowed Giant sequoia (Sequoiadendron gigantuem) log at Log Meadow. It is restored and visited by tourists in Sequoia National Park today, and is on the National Register of Historic Places.

Hale Tharp, along with stepsons George and John Swanson, were the first non-Native American settlers known to ascend the granite dome Moro Rock.
