= Floodgate =

Adjustable gate used to control water flow

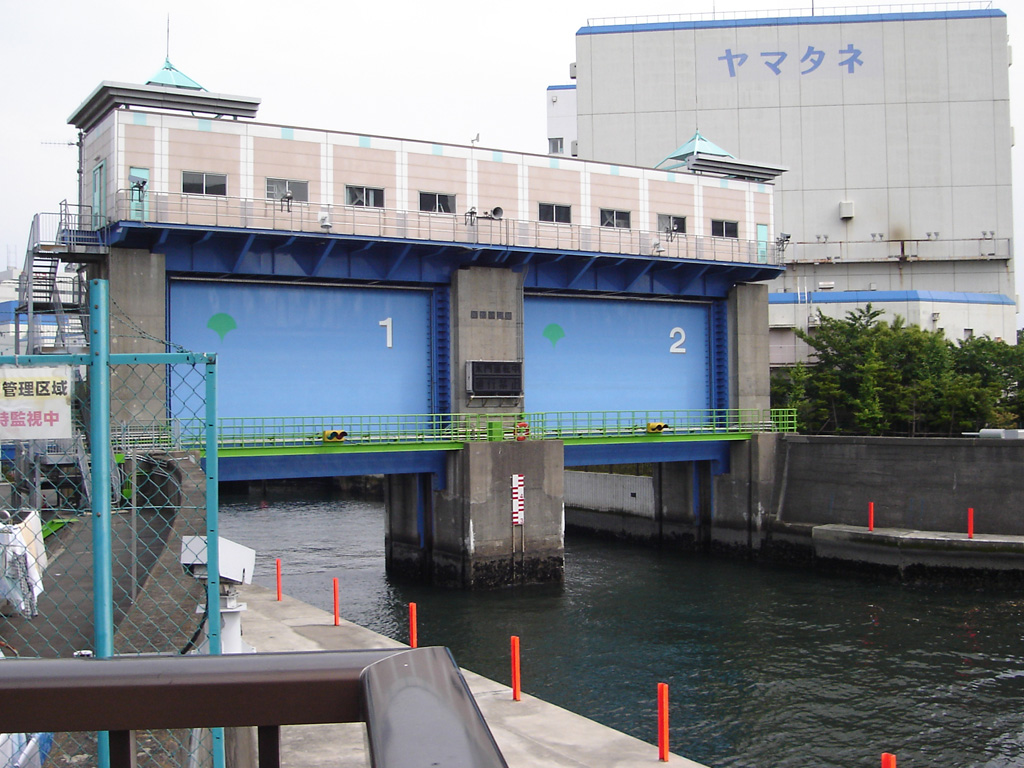
Tokyo floodgates created to protect from typhoon surges

Floodgates, also called stop gates, are adjustable gates used to control water flow in flood barriers, reservoir, river, stream, or levee systems. They may be designed to set spillway crest heights in dams, to adjust flow rates in sluices and canals, or they may be designed to stop water flow entirely as part of a levee or storm surge system. Since most of these devices operate by controlling the water surface elevation being stored or routed, they are also known as crest gates.

In the case of flood bypass systems, floodgates sometimes are also used to lower the water levels in a main river or canal channels by allowing more water to flow into a flood bypass or detention basin when the main river or canal is approaching a flood stage.

== Types ==
Bulkhead gates are vertical walls with movable, or re-movable, sections. Movable sections can be lifted to allow water to pass underneath (as in a sluice gate) and over the top of the structure. Historically, these gates used stacked timbers known as stoplogs or wooden panels known as flashboards to set the dam's crest height. Some floodgates known as coupures in large levee systems slide sideways to open for various traffic. Bulkhead gates can also be made of other materials and used as a single bulkhead unit. Miter gates are used in ship locks and usually close at an 18° angle to approximate an arch.	A sluice gate on the Harran canal	A flood wall gate at Harlan, Kentucky
Hinged crest gates, are wall sections that rotate from vertical to horizontal, thereby varying the height of the dam. They are generally controlled with hydraulic power, although some are passive and are powered by the water being impounded. Variations: flap gate; fish-belly flap gates; Bascule gates; Pelican gates	A US Army Corps of Engineers hinged bascule crest gate during installation	Fish belly flap gates at the Scrivener Dam, Canberra
Radial gates are rotary gates consisting of cylindrical sections. They may rotate vertically or horizontally. Tainter gates are a vertical design that rotates up to allow water to pass underneath. Low friction trunnion bearings, along with a face shape that balances hydrostatic forces, allow this design to close under its own weight as a safety feature.	Tainter gate diagram	Tainter gates and spillway
Drum gates are hollow gate sections that float on water. They are pinned to rotate up or down. Water is allowed into or out of the flotation chamber to adjust the dam's crest height.	Drum gates are controlled with valves	Drum gates on a diversion dam
Roller gates are large cylinders that move in an angled slot. They are hoisted with a chain and have a cogged design that interfaces with their slot.; Clamshell gates have an external clamshell leaf design.	A roller gate on the Mississippi	Clamshell floodgates at the Arrowrock Dam.
Fusegates are a mechanism designed to provide the controlled release of water in the event of exceptionally large floods. The design consists of free standing blocks (the fusegates) set side by side on a flattened spillway sill. The Fusegate blocks act as a fixed weir most of the time, but in excessive flood conditions they are designed to topple forward, allowing the controlled discharge of water. Multiple fusegates are generally set up side by side, with each fusegate designed to release under progressively extreme flooding, thus minimizing the impact of the floodwater on the river downstream. The system was invented and patented by François Lempérière for Hydroplus (Paris, France), subsidiary of GTM Entrepose. It has been installed on more than 50 dams around the world with sizes ranging from 1 m to more than 9 m in height. Fusegate are typically used to increase the storage capacity of existing dams or to maximize the discharge potential of undersized spillways.	Typical fusegate sketch	Fusegate in Terminus Dam - Lake Kaweah
Mitre gates

== Valves ==
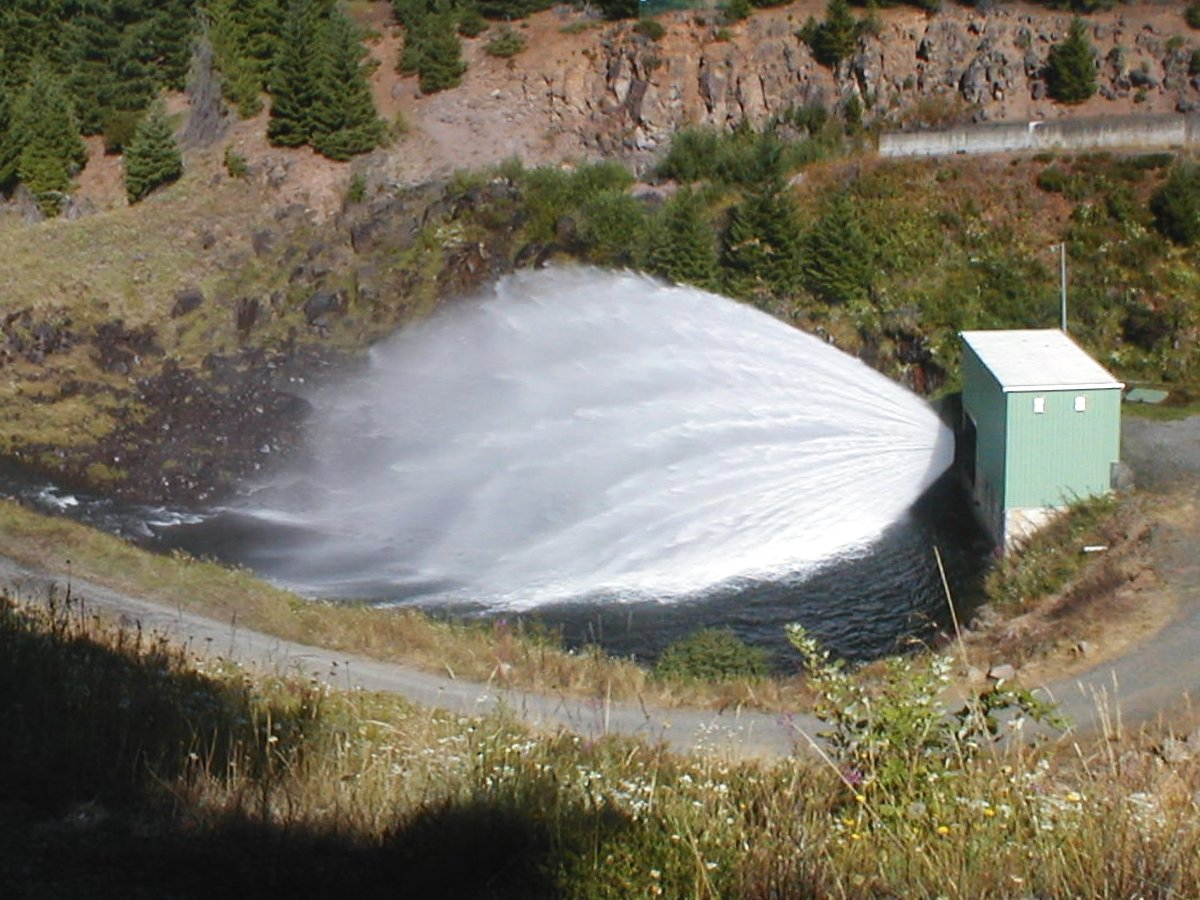
Discharge from a Howell-Bunger valve

Valves used in floodgate applications have a variety of design requirements and are usually located at the base of dams. Often, the most important requirement (besides regulating flow) is energy dissipation. Since water is very heavy, it exits the base of a dam with the enormous force of water pushing from above. Unless this energy is dissipated, the flow can erode nearby rock and soil and damage structures.

Other design requirements include taking into account pressure head operation, the flow rate, whether the valve operates above or below water, and the regulation of precision and cost.

- Fixed cone valves are designed to dissipate the energy from a water flow during reservoir discharge. They are a round pipe section with an adjustable sleeve gate and cone at the discharge end. Flow is varied by moving the sleeve away or towards its cone seat. The design allows high pressure water from the base of a dam to be released without causing erosion to the surrounding environment. Fixed cone valves are able to handle heads up to 300 m.
- Hollow jet valves are a type of needle valve used for floodgate discharge. A cone and seat are inside a pipe. Water flows through an annular gap between the pipe and cone when it is moved downstream, away from the seat. Ribs support the bulb assembly and supply air for water jet stabilization.
- Ring jet valves are similar to fixed cone valves, but have an integral collar that discharges water in a narrow stream. They are suitable for heads up to 50 m.
- Jet flow gate, similar to a gate valve but with a conical restriction prior to the gate leaf that focuses the water into a jet. They were developed in the 1940s by the United States Bureau of Reclamation to allow fine control of discharge flow without the cavitation seen in regular gate valves. Jet flow gates are able to handle heads up to 150 m.

== Physics ==
Opened floodgates at the Merikoski Power Plant in Oulu, Finland

The force on a rectangular flood gate can be calculated by the following equation:

$$\ F = pA$$

where:

F = force measured in newtons (N)
p = pressure $= \rho g h\,$ measured in pascal (Pa)

where:
- ρ is the density of fresh water (1000 kg/m^{3});
- g is the acceleration due to gravity on Earth (9.8 m/s^{2} );
- h is the height of the water column in metres.

A = area = rectangle: length × height measured in m^{2}

where:
length = the horizontal length of a rectangular floodgate measured in metres
height = the height of a non-submerged flood gate from the bottom of the water column to the water surface measured in metres

If the rectangular flood gate is submerged below the surface the same equation can be used but only the height from the water surface to the middle of the gate must be used to calculate the force on the flood gate.

== See also ==
- Flood barrier
- Flood management
- Tidal barrage
- Canal lock
- Thames Barrier
- Delta Works
  - Oosterscheldekering
