= Lake Kaweah =

Reservoir in Tulare County, California

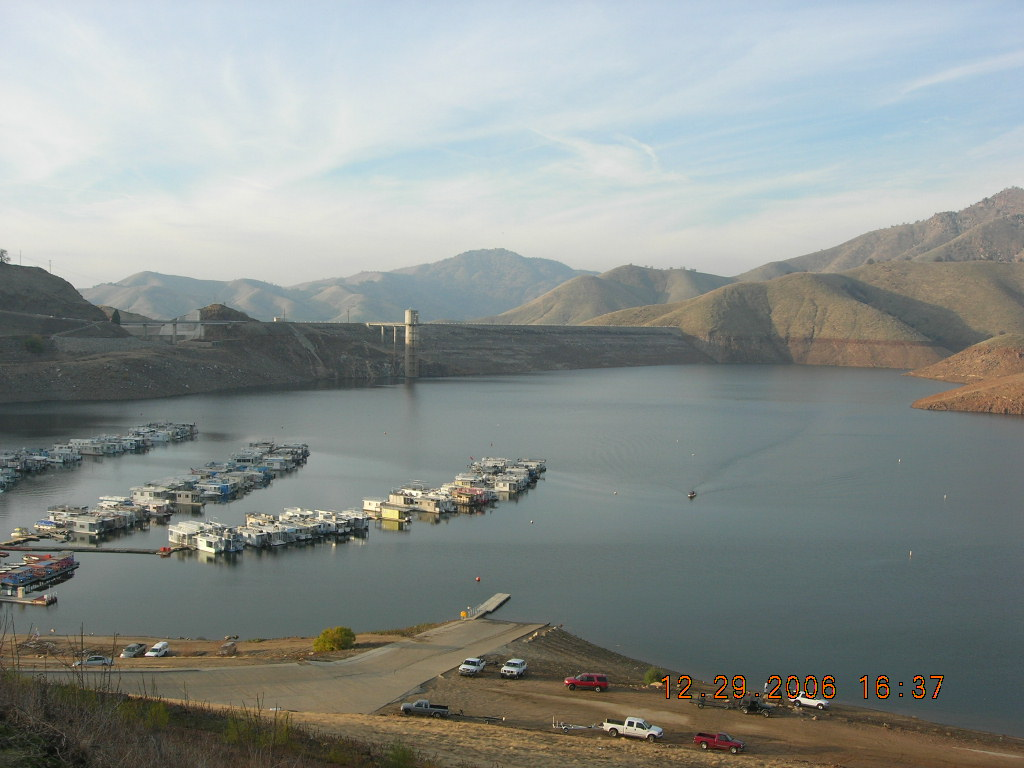

- Location of Lake Kaweah in California, USA Lake Kaweah (the United States)
- Location: Tulare County, California
- Coordinates: 36°24′54″N 119°00′00″W
- Type: Reservoir
- Primary inflows: Kaweah River
- Primary outflows: Kaweah River
- Catchment area: 560 sq mi (1,500 km^{2})
- Basin countries: United States
- Water volume: 185,000 acre⋅ft (228,000,000 m^{3})
- References: U.S. Geological Survey Geographic Names Information System: Lake Kaweah

Lake Kaweah is a reservoir near Lemon Cove in Tulare County, California. The lake is formed by Terminus Dam on the Kaweah River. The river originates in the Sierra Nevada and drains about 560 sq mi (1,500 km^{2}) into Lake Kaweah before flowing towards the San Joaquin Valley. From Lake Kaweah, the river flows toward the city of Visalia, splitting into the Kaweah River and St. Johns River as it flows west into the Tulare Lakebed. The lake has a capacity of 185,000 acre⋅ft (228,000,000 m^{3}). A project to raise the lake 21 ft (6.4 m) was completed in 2004. The lake now impounds an additional 42,000 acre⋅ft (52,000,000 m^{3}) and downstream flood protection to downstream communities and agricultural land has been increased.

Because its primary purpose is flood control, Lake Kaweah is maintained at a very low level or empty for most of the year, and generally only fills between May and June. Due to the limited capacity of the reservoir, large spills of floodwater often occur after large rain storms. In the winter, water is released as quickly as possible to ensure room for floodwater which can then be released at a controlled rate. During floods in 1997, the reservoir filled and emptied twice because of this operational regimen.

In 2007, high winds from a severe thunderstorm cut loose the boat dock along the lake, affecting 200 boats.

At the upper end of Lake Kaweah is the small town of Three Rivers, which sits at the entrance to Sequoia National Park.

== See also ==
- 2025 water release from Lake Kaweah and Lake Success
- Lime Kiln Creek
- List of dams and reservoirs in California
- List of lakes in California
