= North Fork Kaweah River =

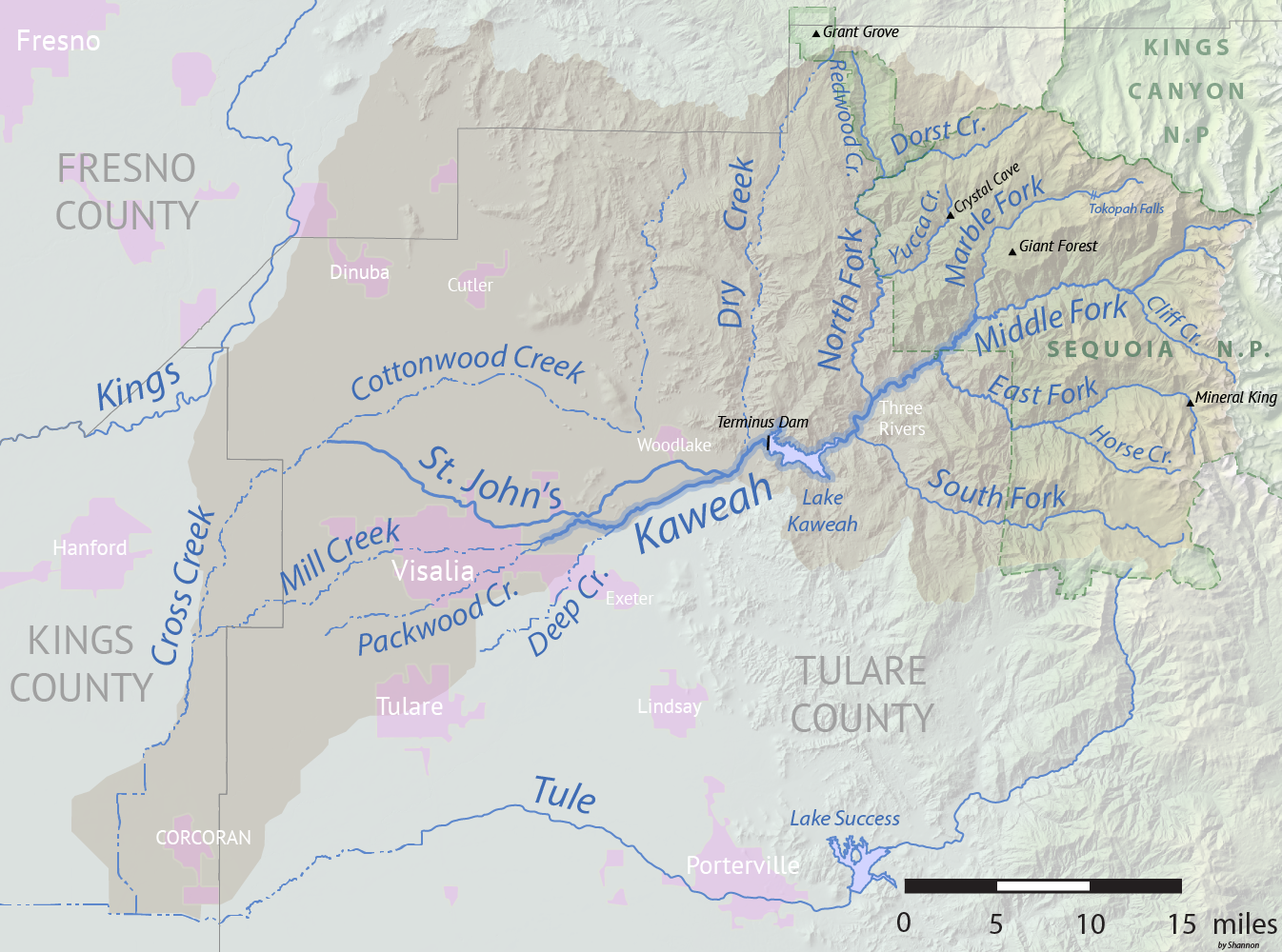
- Map of the Kaweah River drainage basin

Location
- Country: United States
- State: California

Physical characteristics
- Source: Confluence of Dorst Creek and Stony Creek
  - coordinates: 36°38′38″N 118°50′44″W
  - elevation: 5,389 ft (1,643 m)
- Mouth: Kaweah River
  - location: Three Rivers
  - coordinates: 36°26′51″N 118°54′08″W
  - elevation: 807 ft (246 m)
- Length: 21.4 mi (34.4 km)
- Basin size: 138.4 sq mi (358 km^{2})

The North Fork Kaweah River is a 21.4-mile (34.4 km)-long tributary of the Kaweah River in Tulare County, California. The river starts at the confluence of Dorst Creek and Stony Creek, near Dorst Creek Campground in Sequoia National Park. It flows west and is joined by Redwood Creek, which drains Redwood Mountain Grove, the largest grove of giant sequoias on earth. The river then turns south, flowing through a remote canyon, forming the western boundary of the park as far as Yucca Creek, which flows from Crystal Cave in Sequoia National Park. It continues south and passes the Three Rivers Airport before emptying into the Kaweah River at Three Rivers.

== See also ==
- List of rivers of California
