= Terminus Dam =

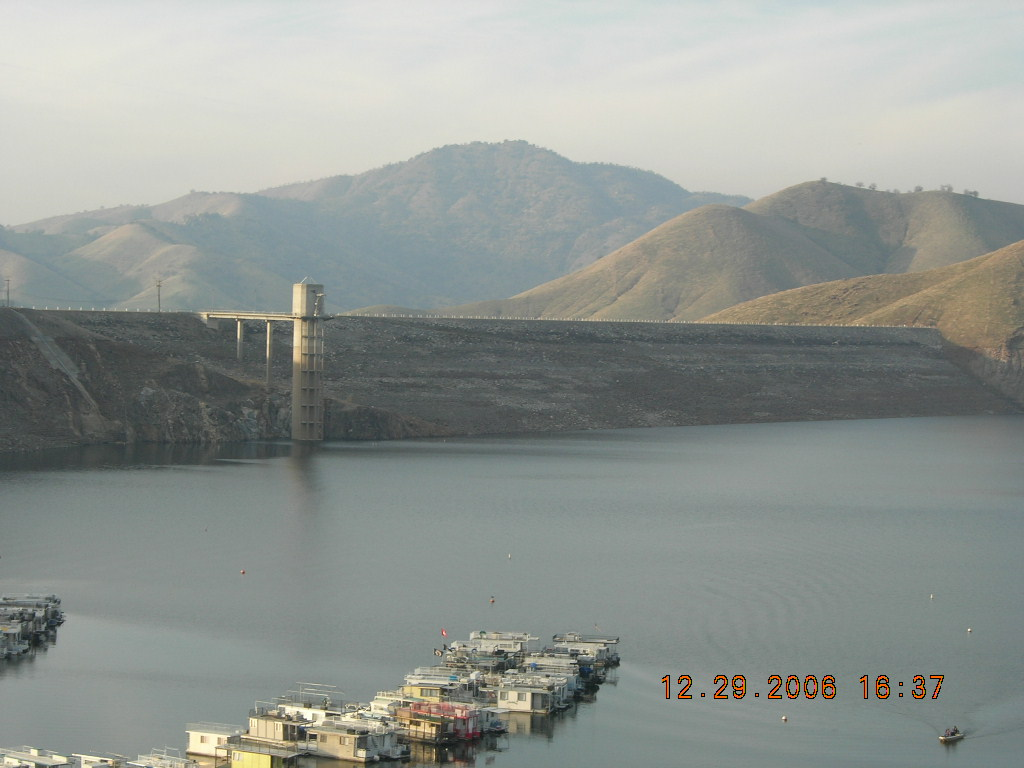
- The dam and Lake Kaweah as seen from the visitor center along Route 198
- Interactive map of Terminus Dam
- Location: Three Rivers, Tulare County, California, U.S.
- Coordinates: 36°25′01″N 119°00′14″W
- Opening date: 1962; 64 years ago
- Construction cost: $24 million
- Owners: U.S. Army Corps of Engineers, Sacramento District

Dam and spillways
- Type of dam: Earthfill
- Impounds: Kaweah River
- Height: 255 ft (78 m)
- Length: 2,375 ft (724 m)
- Elevation at crest: 750 ft (230 m)
- Dam volume: 7,000,000 yd^{3} (5,400,000 m^{3})

Reservoir
- Creates: Lake Kaweah
- Total capacity: 185,600 acre⋅ft (0.2289 km^{3})
- Catchment area: 561 mi^{2} (1,450 km^{2})
- Surface area: 1,945 acres (787 ha)

Power Station
- Commission date: 1992
- Installed capacity: 20.09 MW
- Annual generation: 40,894,000 KWh (2001–2012)
- Website; U.S. Army Corps of Engineers - Lake Kaweah / Terminus Dam

Terminus Dam is a dam on the Kaweah River in Tulare County, California in the United States, located near Three Rivers about 15 mi (24 km) from the western boundary of Sequoia National Park and 20 mi (32 km) east of Visalia. The dam forms Lake Kaweah for flood control and irrigation water supply. Completed by the U.S. Army Corps of Engineers (USACE) in 1962, Terminus is an earthfill dam 255 ft (78 m) high and 2,375 ft (724 m) long. The reservoir has a maximum capacity of 185,600 acre⋅ft (0.2289 km^{3}) of water, although it usually sits at much lower levels.

== Background ==
Various informal proposals to dam the Kaweah River existed in the early 20th century. In April 1917, a group formed in Visalia, representing irrigation ditch companies across the region, to discuss building the dam. Around the same time, the California legislature approved plans to investigate the project's feasibility. Initial engineering surveys began in May 1917 along the Kaweah. After the California legislature passed the Water Control Act of 1927, the Kaweah Delta Water Conservation District was formed in January 1928, which was the first flood control district in the state. In the early 1940s, the United States Army Corps of Engineers took surveys for the purpose of a flood control dam along the Kaweah, as well as the nearby Tule River. Amid World War II, the Bureau of Reclamation blocked the release of the report for more than two years, due to an executive order by President Franklin Delano Roosevelt. In March 1943, Tulare County created a committee to launch their own studies on building the dam, to present their findings to the United States Congress. In June of year, the Kaweah Delta Water Conservation District also petitioned the United States Congress to build the dams. The Army Corps of Engineers took additional surveys for the dams in 1943 into 1944, proposing a 180 ft (55 m) high structure along the Kaweah River, which would create a reservoir of 1,860 acres (750 ha). In March 1944, the United States House Flood Control Committee approved $4.6 million toward building both the Kaweah and Tule dams, as part of legislation that became the Flood Control Act of 1944, signed into law that December.

By January 1945, the planned Terminus Dam along the Kaweah was constructed to be 223 ft (68 m) high, which was higher than initial estimates to account for larger and more regular flooding. The structure was named for originally being the terminus of a railroad extending from Visalia. The project was delayed at first due to the ongoing war, but by August 1945, Congress authorized funds for preliminary tests for the planned dams. In May 1946, preliminary drilling work began for the site. However, lack of funding prevented more immediate action for construction. In 1948, with plans for the dam on the Kaweah River nearly complete, an archaeological survey of the future reservoir site revealed an unusually rich selection of Native American artifacts. In 1950, two Yokuts villages were excavated, which would be underwater after the dam was finished. Many of the artifacts were removed by the U.S. National Park Service's Interagency Archaeological Salvage Program before the beginning of work on the dam. Following downstream floods in December 1955 into early 1956, the United States Congress authorized $18.6 million toward building the Terminus Dam in July 1956, partly as a response to the floods. A month later, the Army Corps of Engineers publicly released their updated plan – the new dam would be earth-filled, with a height of 225 ft (69 m), a length of 2,700 ft (820 m) long, and enough storage capacity to hold more than double of the December 1955 floods. In preparation for the new dam, the California Highway Department relocated a portion of SR 198 to higher ground. Further progress was stalled due to insufficient federal funding, until the 1959 fiscal year. In December 1958, the Army Corps approved a $9.4 million construction contract to a joint venture based in Monrovia, California.

== History ==
Construction for the Terminus Dam began in January 1959, with a formal groundbreaking ceremony held on February 19. By the end of July 1959, construction work was 9% complete, consisting of tree removal, soil movement, and an outlet tunnel. During the fall of 1959, water flow along the Kaweah was low, which allowed workers to divert the river and start building the dam's base. By December 1959, construction work was 27% complete. A team of 151 workers and engineers built the dam, while another 138 people relocated the portion of SR 198. That month, an observation area opened to allow visitors to view the progress of the construction. By February 1961, construction work was about halfway complete, with a small portion left open due to the potential for winter flooding. The water diversion tunnel was finished on July 1 of that year, forcing the Kaweah River into a 12.75 ft (3.89 m) tunnel. At that time, workers could construct the unfinished portion. Throughout 1961, phone and electric company workers removed power lines and poles. In April 1962, the dam's spillway was finished. On May 18, the dam, along with the nearby Success Dam, were both formally dedicated. Congressman Harlan Hagen attended the ceremony, along with roughly 500 others, including General William F. Cassidy. The cost for Terminus Dam was $19.3 million. Operations were handled by the Army Corps.

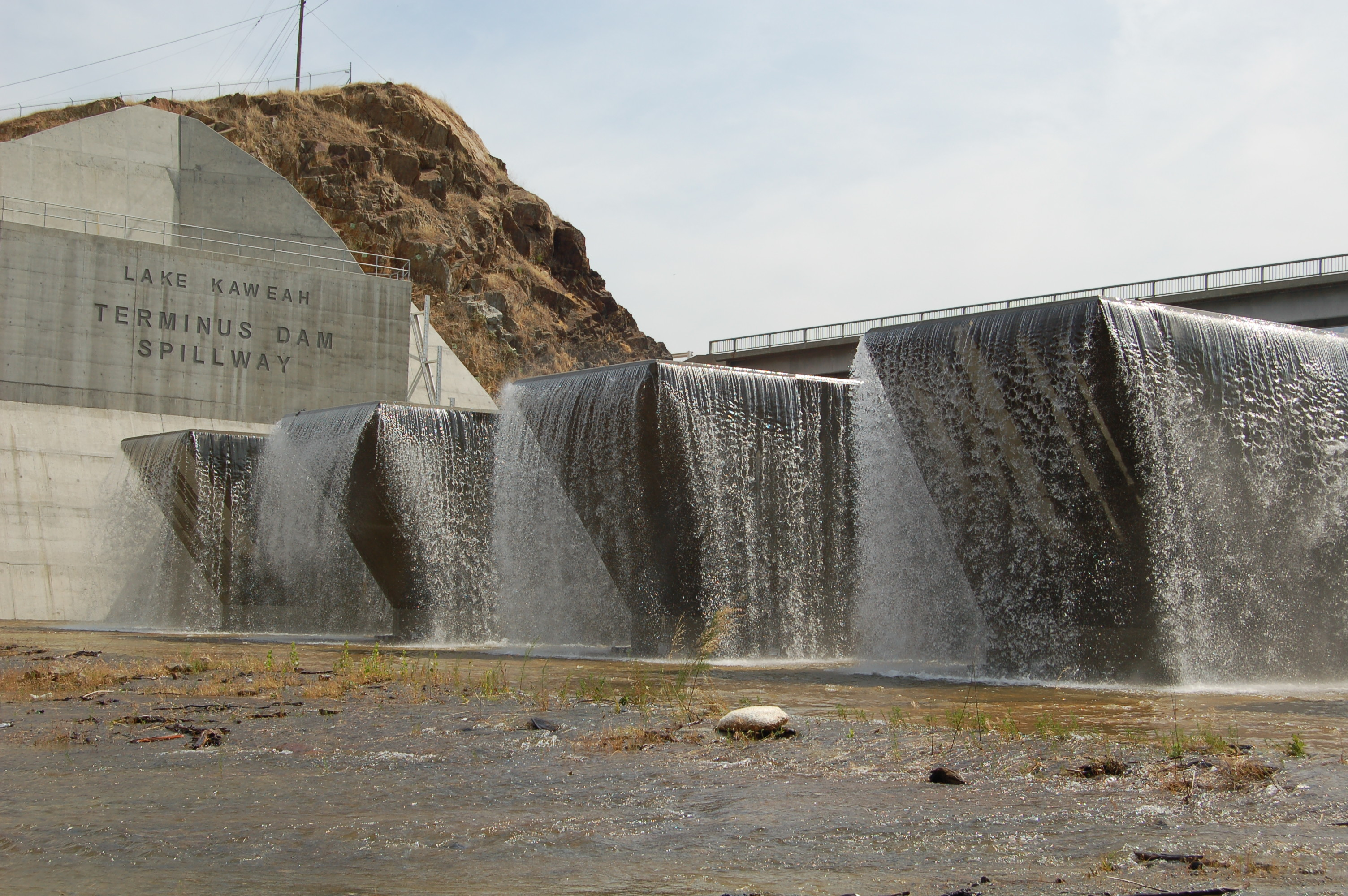
The fusegates at Terminus Dam are tested by high water in 2005

The waterway behind the dam, Lake Kaweah, was formally signed into law on August 8, 1962, following unanimous approval by the House of Representatives in June, and approval by the Senate in July. During a flood in 1963, a television station in Los Angeles falsely reported that the dam burst. The reservoir behind the dam filled for the first time in 1964, with an initial capacity of 150,000 acre⋅ft (0.19 km^{3}). Originally, the reservoir was designed to accommodate about 8,000 acre⋅ft (0.0099 km^{3}) of storage space for sedimentation, or the accumulation of silt. A hydrographic survey in 1977 indicated that about 7,000 acre⋅ft (0.0086 km^{3}) of sediment had already accumulated; this limited the dam's future flooding potential. In December 1985, both Tulare County and the Kaweah Delta Water Conservation District requested for the Army Corps to study expanding the storage potential for Terminus Dam. The Water Resources Development Act of 1996 authorized $20.2 million toward expanding the dam's spillway. In 2001, the spillway expansion project began with excavating about 150 ft (46 m) of adjacent hillside. In 2002, the Whitaker Construction Company started constructing six concrete fusegates, each 21 ft (6.4 m) in height, upstream of the existing spillway. The project, finished in February 2004, increased the dam's flood storage potential to withstand a 1-in-76–year flood, up from a 46–year flood. Upon completion, the fusegates were the third of its type, and largest, to be constructed. The project increased the storage capacity of Lake Kaweah by more than 40,000 acre⋅ft (0.049 km^{3}), to its current capacity of 185,600 acre⋅ft (0.2289 km^{3}), and ensured the capability of Terminus Dam to pass a flood of up to 300,000 cu ft/s (8,500 m^{3}/s).

Together with the three other major dams in the Tulare basin, Terminus Dam contributed to the desiccation of Tulare Lake, once one of the largest wetland regions in the United States.

=== Power generation ===
In 1982, the Kaweah Delta Water Conservation District and the Tulare Irrigation District jointly created the Kaweah River Power Authority (KRPA) to build a hydroelectric facility at Terminus Dam. After the KRPA applied for a license in 1984 to build a 17 MW power plant, the Federal Energy Regulatory Commission approved the project in August 1986. Construction on the Terminus Power Project began in 1987, and was finished in 1990, when it began delivering electricity to Southern California Edison.

== Functions ==
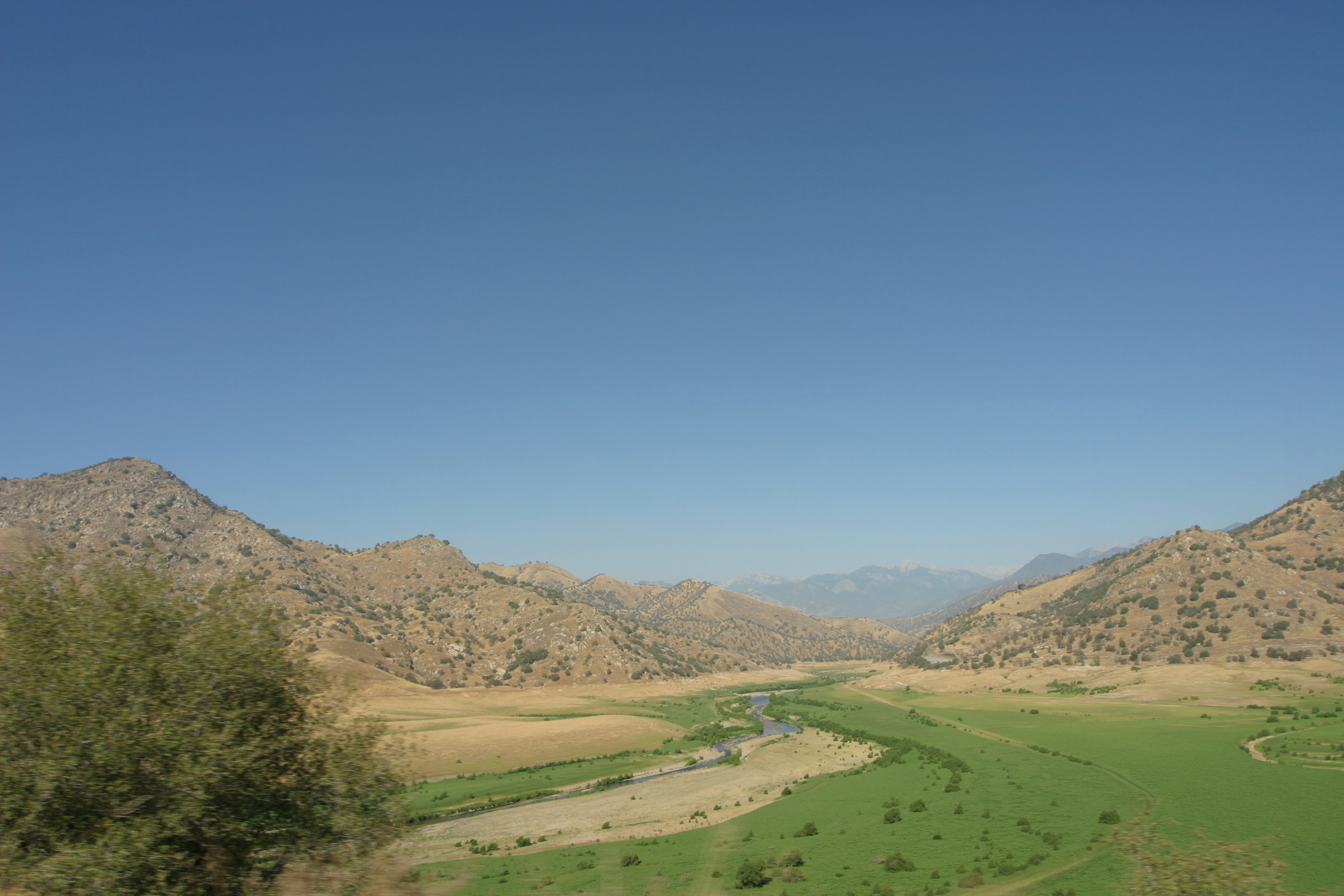
View of the reservoir area, drawn down for flood control in September

As a dry dam, Terminus Dam's primary purpose is flood control; consequently, the reservoir is usually maintained at a very low level, except in late spring and early summer when it is used to store snowmelt runoff from the Sierra Nevada. The dam provides flood protection for 500,000 acres (2,000 km^{2}) of farmland and 300,000 people along the lower Kaweah River. Shortly after its completion, the dam and reservoir were put to the test by record floods in December 1966, during which Terminus, Success and Isabella Dams prevented a collective $81.9 million of damages. Between 1962 and 2012, Terminus Dam has prevented $373,225,000 of flood-related damages.

Water releases from Terminus Dam are made based on agricultural demand when flood control releases are not required. Snowmelt runoff stored in Lake Kaweah are released at high rates between May and late July-early August during the peak of the irrigation season. The water serves multiple local water districts such as the Tulare Irrigation District (TID) and Kaweah Delta Water Conservation District (KDWCD), as well as urban areas including Visalia and Tulare. The dam also generates hydroelectricity from a plant built in 1992 by the Kaweah River Power Authority (KRPA), which is jointly managed by TID and KDWCD. Electricity generated here is distributed by Southern California Edison. The power plant currently has a capacity of 20.09 megawatts (MW), upgraded from its original capacity of 17 MW, and generates roughly 40 million kilowatt hours (KWh) per year. The KRPA planned to expand this capacity by a further 9 MW, which would allow for the generation of an additional 9.2 million KWh, but construction has not yet started as of March 2020. In February 2020, the KRPA filed to transfer their operating license to Eagle Creek Renewable Energy, the US subsidiary of Ontario Power Generation.

== See also ==
- 2025 water release from Lake Kaweah and Lake Success
- Central Valley Project
- List of dams and reservoirs in California

== Works cited ==
- Brewer, Chris (2004). Historic Tulare County: A Sesquicentennial History, 1852-2002. HPN Books. ISBN 1-89361-940-0.
- Garone, Philip (2011). The Fall and Rise of the Wetlands of California's Great Central Valley. University of California Press. ISBN 978-0-52094-849-5.
