= Hart Tree =

Giant sequoia in Redwood Mountain Grove, California

Coordinates: 36°41′43″N 118°53′28″W

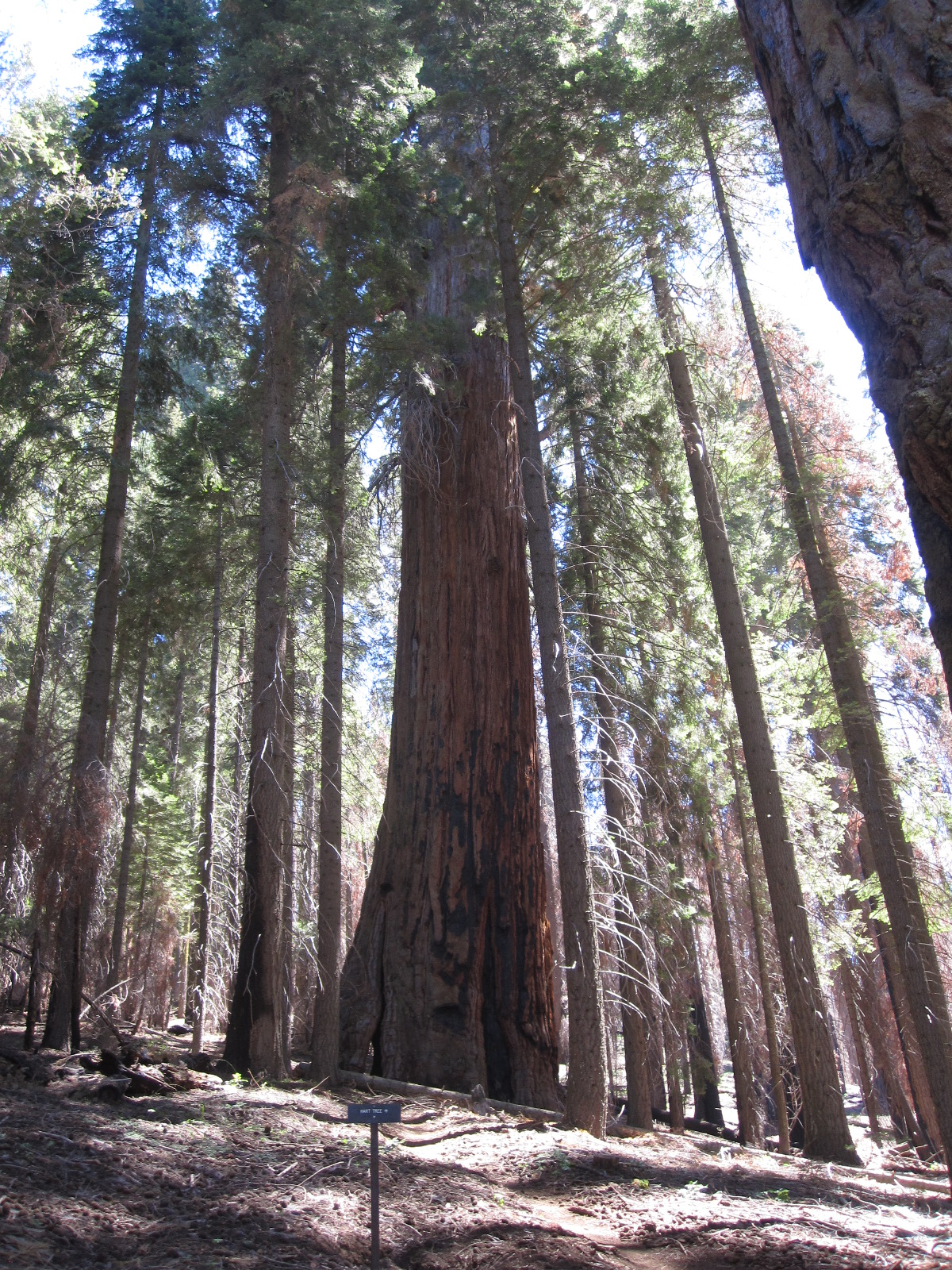
Hart Tree in the Redwood Mountain Grove.

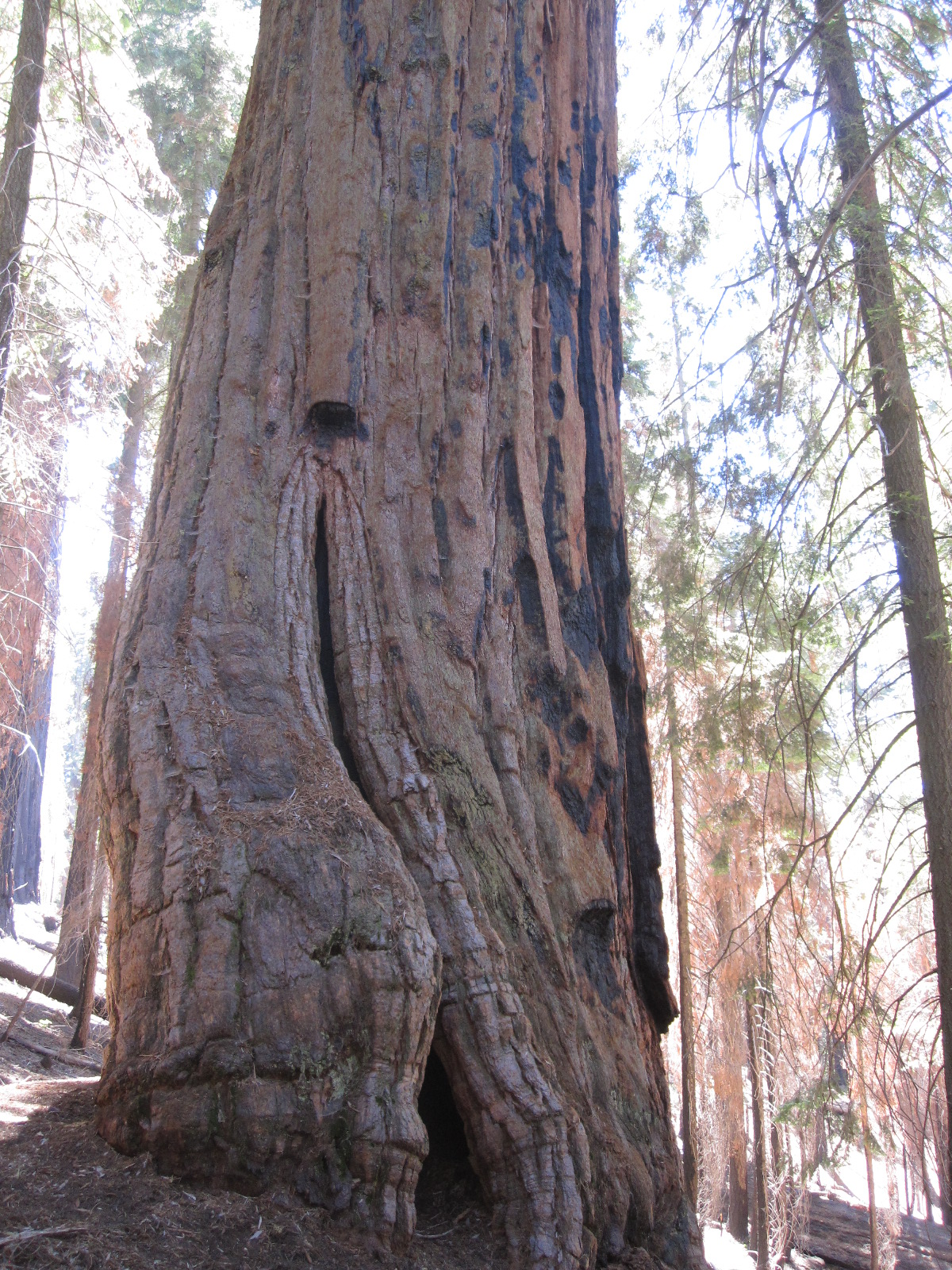
Hart Tree

The Hart Tree is a Giant sequoia (Sequoiadendron giganteum) tree within the Redwood Mountain Grove, in the Sierra Nevada and Fresno County, California. The Redwood Mountain Grove is protected within Kings Canyon National Park and the Giant Sequoia National Monument. It is the 25th largest giant sequoia in the world, and could be considered the 24th largest depending on how badly Ishi Giant atrophied during the Rough Fire in 2015.

== Description ==
It was once claimed to be the fourth largest Giant sequoia in the world, but is now considered the 24th largest. It has a volume of around 980 cubic metres (35,000 cu ft). The Hart Tree is located 37 m (121 ft) north of the Roosevelt Tree, a slightly larger giant sequoia with a volume of 991.5 cubic metres (35,010 cu ft).

The tree was named for Michael Hart, who discovered it sometime around 1880.

Redwood Mountain Grove is the largest grove of Giant sequoias in the world, and is the location of the tallest one of the species on earth at 311 feet (95 m) (unnamed).

== Dimensions ==
Height above base	277.9 ft	84.7 m
Circumference at ground	75.3 ft	23.0 m
Diameter 4.5 ft (1.4 m) above height point on ground	21.3 ft	6.5 m
Diameter 60 ft (18 m) above base	14.4 ft	4.4 m
Diameter 120 ft (37 m) above base	12.9 ft	3.9 m
Diameter 180 ft (55 m) above base	11.3 ft	3.4 m
Estimated bole volume	34,407 ft^{3}	974 m^{3}

== See also ==
- List of largest giant sequoias
- List of individual trees
- Flora of the Sierra Nevada (United States)
