= Tokopah Falls =

Cascading waterfall

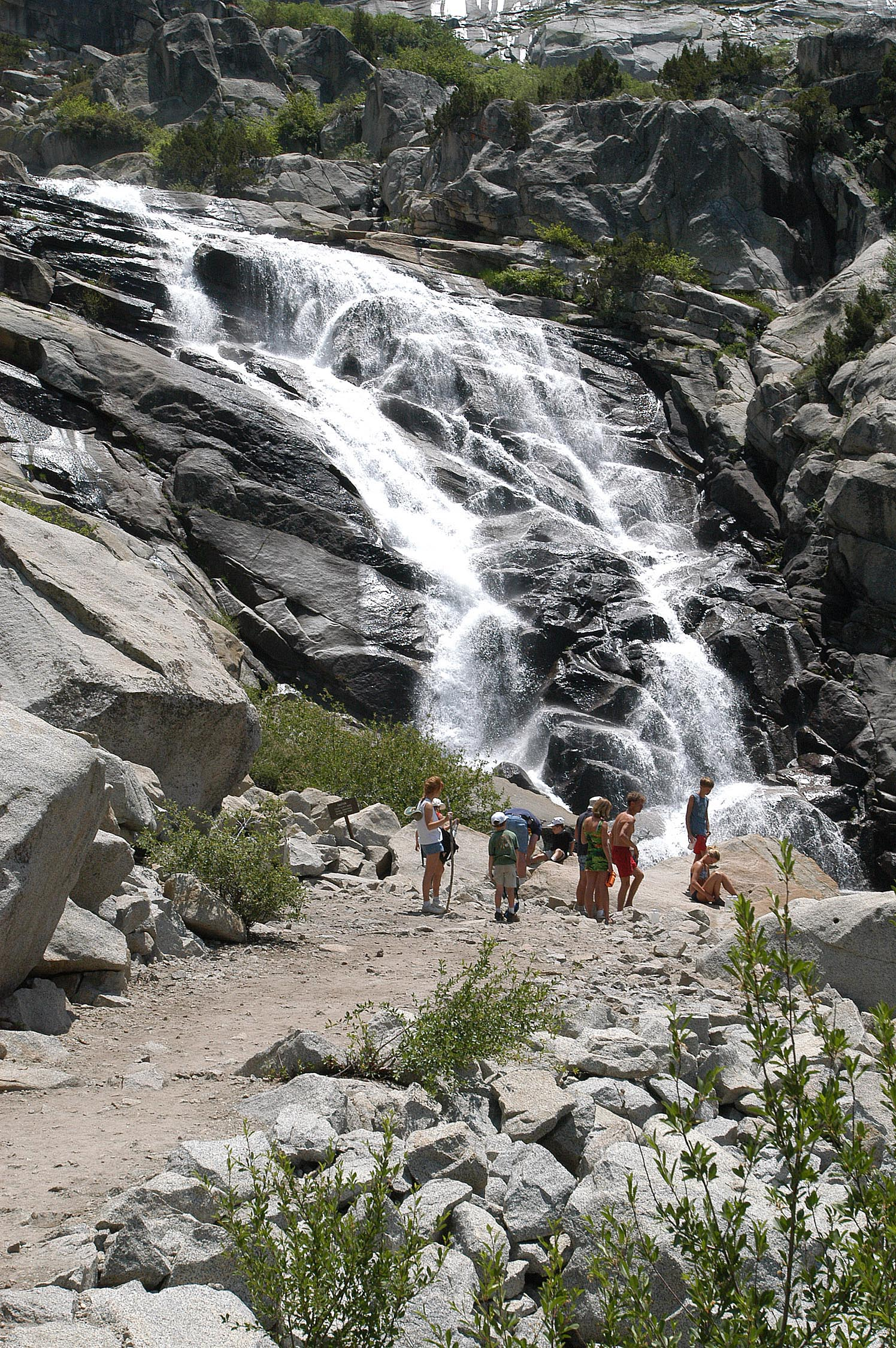
- Lower tier of Tokopah Falls

- Location within California
- Location: Sequoia National Park, California
- Coordinates: 36°36′32″N 118°41′26″W
- Total height: 1,200 feet (370 m)
- Watercourse: Kaweah River

Tokopah Falls, also known as Tokopah Valley Falls, is a 1,200-foot (370 m) cascading waterfall in Sequoia National Park, California. The falls are formed as the Marble Fork of the Kaweah River slides down a huge granite headwall of the glacial Tokopah Valley. Although the falls flow powerfully during the snow melt of late spring and early summer, it is usually a trickle by autumn, occasionally drying up completely during poor snow years.

The falls are accessible by a fairly flat 4.1-mile (6.6 km) roundtrip hike from Highway 198.

== See also ==
- List of waterfalls
- List of waterfalls of California
