= Jeremy Railton =

American art director (1944–2025)

- Born: Jeremy Jack Railton; August 2, 1944; Bulawayo, Southern Rhodesia
- Died: July 9, 2025 (aged 80); Three Rivers, California, U.S.
- Occupation(s): Art director, costume and production designer

Jeremy Jack Railton (August 2, 1944 – July 9, 2025) was a Zimbabwean-born American art director, costume and production designer. He won two Primetime Emmy Awards in the category Outstanding Art Direction.

Railton died at his home in Three Rivers, California, on July 9, 2025, at the age of 80.
