= Lemon Cove, California =

Census-designated place in California, United States

Lemon Cove
- Unincorporated Community; Census Designated Place
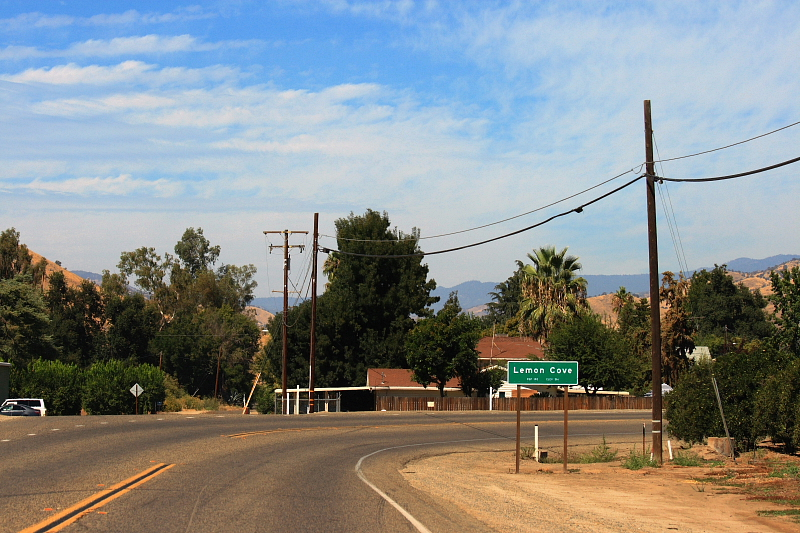

- Location in Tulare County and the state of California

- Location in the United States
- Coordinates: 36°22′53″N 119°1′33″W
- Country: United States
- State: California
- County: Tulare

Area
  - Total: 1.335 sq mi (3.458 km^{2})
  - Land: 1.335 sq mi (3.458 km^{2})
  - Water: 0 sq mi (0 km^{2}) 0%
- Elevation: 502 ft (153 m)

Population (2020)
  - Total: 298
  - Density: 223/sq mi (86.2/km^{2})
- Time zone: UTC-8 (Pacific)
  - Summer (DST): UTC-7 (PDT)
- ZIP code: 93244
- Area code: 559
- FIPS code: 06-41110
- GNIS feature IDs: 244733, 2408598

Lemon Cove is a census-designated place (CDP) in Tulare County, California, United States. It is situated in the San Joaquin Valley near the foothills of the Sierra Nevada. The population was 298 at the 2020 census, down from 308 at the 2010 census.

== Geography and ecology ==
Lemon Cove is located at 36°22′53″N 119°1′33″W (36.381425, -119.025917) near the confluence of Lime Kiln Creek and the Kaweah River.

There are numerous flora and fauna species in the vicinity of Lemon Cove. The local Lime Kiln Creek watershed contains many wildflowers of numerous taxa; included in these are the yellow mariposa lily, Calochortus luteus.

According to the United States Census Bureau, the CDP has a total area of 1.3 square miles (3.4 km^{2}), all land.

At the 2010 census, the CDP had a total area of 0.8 square miles (2.1 km^{2}), all land.

== Climate ==
Lemon Cove has a hot-summer Mediterranean climate (Csa) typical of the foothills of California's Central Valley with hot, dry summers and cool, wet winters.

Climate data for Lemon Cove, California (1991–2020 normals, extremes 1899–present)
Month	Jan	Feb	Mar	Apr	May	Jun	Jul	Aug	Sep	Oct	Nov	Dec	Year
Record high °F (°C)	82 (28)	87 (31)	93 (34)	110 (43)	118 (48)	115 (46)	118 (48)	115 (46)	115 (46)	103 (39)	92 (33)	86 (30)	118.0 (47.8)
Mean maximum °F (°C)	70.5 (21.4)	76.4 (24.7)	84.2 (29.0)	92.2 (33.4)	100.2 (37.9)	106.4 (41.3)	107.8 (42.1)	107.0 (41.7)	103.7 (39.8)	95.4 (35.2)	82.5 (28.1)	70.3 (21.3)	109.4 (43.0)
Mean daily maximum °F (°C)	59.5 (15.3)	65.1 (18.4)	71.2 (21.8)	77.2 (25.1)	85.7 (29.8)	94.3 (34.6)	100.1 (37.8)	99.3 (37.4)	93.9 (34.4)	82.9 (28.3)	68.7 (20.4)	59.2 (15.1)	79.8 (26.5)
Daily mean °F (°C)	48.9 (9.4)	53.2 (11.8)	58.0 (14.4)	62.3 (16.8)	69.6 (20.9)	76.9 (24.9)	82.5 (28.1)	81.2 (27.3)	76.3 (24.6)	67.0 (19.4)	55.7 (13.2)	48.2 (9.0)	65.0 (18.3)
Mean daily minimum °F (°C)	38.3 (3.5)	41.4 (5.2)	44.7 (7.1)	47.4 (8.6)	53.5 (11.9)	59.4 (15.2)	64.9 (18.3)	63.1 (17.3)	58.7 (14.8)	51.0 (10.6)	42.7 (5.9)	37.3 (2.9)	50.2 (10.1)
Mean minimum °F (°C)	29.8 (−1.2)	32.4 (0.2)	34.7 (1.5)	36.8 (2.7)	42.7 (5.9)	48.0 (8.9)	56.8 (13.8)	55.4 (13.0)	48.5 (9.2)	41.7 (5.4)	33.6 (0.9)	29.5 (−1.4)	28.2 (−2.1)
Record low °F (°C)	15 (−9)	20 (−7)	25 (−4)	27 (−3)	31 (−1)	38 (3)	36 (2)	38 (3)	36 (2)	26 (−3)	20 (−7)	19 (−7)	15 (−9)
Average precipitation inches (mm)	2.68 (68)	2.33 (59)	2.48 (63)	1.42 (36)	0.62 (16)	0.15 (3.8)	0.02 (0.51)	0.00 (0.00)	0.06 (1.5)	0.67 (17)	1.33 (34)	2.29 (58)	14.05 (356.81)
Average precipitation days	8.5	8.4	7.5	4.9	2.9	0.5	0.3	0.1	0.7	2.5	4.7	7.3	48.3
Source: NOAA

== Demographics ==
Historical population
Census	Pop.	Note	%±
2000	298		—
2010	308		3.4%
2020	298		−3.2%
U.S. Decennial Census; 1860–1870 1880-1890; 1900 1910 1920; 1930 1940 1950; 1960 1970 1980; 1990 2000 2010

Lemon Cove first appeared as a census designated place in the 2000 U.S. census.

=== 2020 ===
The 2020 United States census reported that Lemon Cove had a population of 298. The population density was 223.2 inhabitants per square mile (86.2/km^{2}). The racial makeup of Lemon Cove was 209 (70.1%) White, 0 (0.0%) African American, 5 (1.7%) Native American, 1 (0.3%) Asian, 1 (0.3%) Pacific Islander, 29 (9.7%) from other races, and 53 (17.8%) from two or more races. Hispanic or Latino of any race were 82 persons (27.5%).

The whole population lived in households. There were 117 households, out of which 49 (41.9%) had children under the age of 18 living in them, 80 (68.4%) were married-couple households, 5 (4.3%) were cohabiting couple households, 28 (23.9%) had a female householder with no partner present, and 4 (3.4%) had a male householder with no partner present. 13 households (11.1%) were one person, and 9 (7.7%) were one person aged 65 or older. The average household size was 2.55. There were 102 families (87.2% of all households).

The age distribution was 70 people (23.5%) under the age of 18, 13 people (4.4%) aged 18 to 24, 73 people (24.5%) aged 25 to 44, 85 people (28.5%) aged 45 to 64, and 57 people (19.1%) who were 65 years of age or older. The median age was 39.5 years. For every 100 females, there were 88.6 males.

There were 131 housing units at an average density of 98.1 units per square mile (37.9 units/km^{2}), of which 117 (89.3%) were occupied. Of these, 80 (68.4%) were owner-occupied, and 37 (31.6%) were occupied by renters.

=== 2010 ===
The 2010 United States census reported that Lemon Cove had a population of 308. The population density was 369.5 inhabitants per square mile (142.7/km^{2}). The racial makeup of Lemon Cove was 261 (84.7%) White, 0 (0.0%) African American, 5 (1.6%) Native American, 3 (1.0%) Asian, 2 (0.6%) Pacific Islander, 12 (3.9%) from other races, and 25 (8.1%) from two or more races. Hispanic or Latino of any race were 76 persons (24.7%).

The Census reported that 308 people (100% of the population) lived in households, 0 (0%) lived in non-institutionalized group quarters, and 0 (0%) were institutionalized.

There were 120 households, out of which 39 (32.5%) had children under the age of 18 living in them, 53 (44.2%) were opposite-sex married couples living together, 19 (15.8%) had a female householder with no husband present, 7 (5.8%) had a male householder with no wife present. There were 4 (3.3%) unmarried opposite-sex partnerships, and 0 (0%) same-sex married couples or partnerships. 37 households (30.8%) were made up of individuals, and 10 (8.3%) had someone living alone who was 65 years of age or older. The average household size was 2.57. There were 79 families (65.8% of all households); the average family size was 3.16.

The population was spread out, with 82 people (26.6%) under the age of 18, 32 people (10.4%) aged 18 to 24, 58 people (18.8%) aged 25 to 44, 92 people (29.9%) aged 45 to 64, and 44 people (14.3%) who were 65 years of age or older. The median age was 39.6 years. For every 100 females, there were 106.7 males. For every 100 females age 18 and over, there were 107.3 males.

There were 153 housing units at an average density of 183.5 per square mile (70.8/km^{2}), of which 77 (64.2%) were owner-occupied, and 43 (35.8%) were occupied by renters. The homeowner vacancy rate was 0%; the rental vacancy rate was 6.0%. 202 people (65.6% of the population) lived in owner-occupied housing units and 106 people (34.4%) lived in rental housing units.

== Government ==
In the California State Senate, Lemon Cove is in the 12th senatorial district, represented by Republican Shannon Grove, and in the California State Assembly it is in the 32nd Assembly district, represented by Republican Stan Ellis.

In the United States House of Representatives, Lemon Cove is in California's 21st congressional district, represented by Democrat Jim Costa.

== Education ==
The CDP is served by the Sequoia Union Elementary School District and by the Exeter Unified School District for grades 9-12.

== Notable people ==
- Willard Hershberger, baseball player.
- Susan Peters, Actress
