= Lime Kiln Creek =

Stream

Coordinates: 36.4176°N 119.0212°W

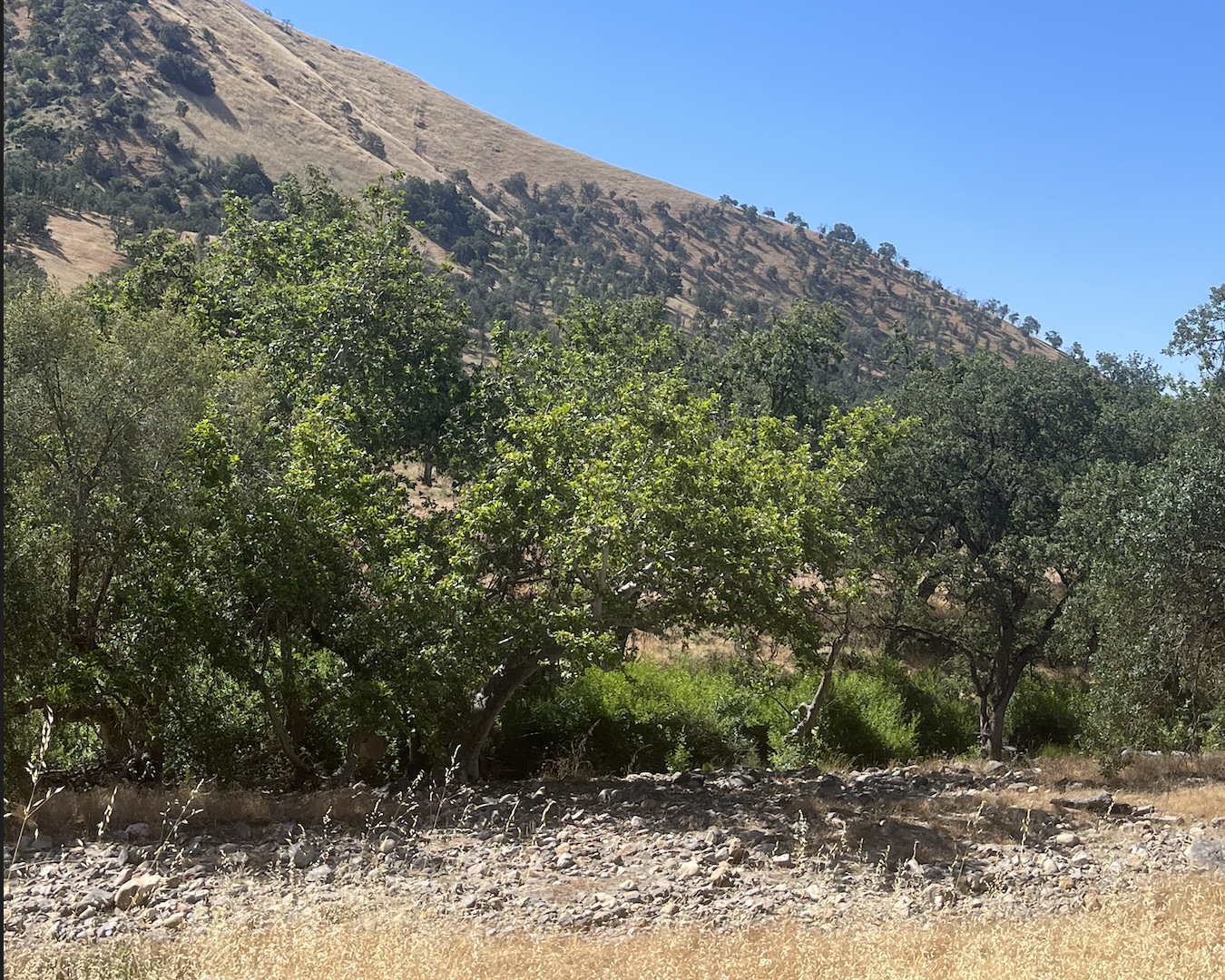
A dry stretch of Lime Kiln Creek (Dry Creek), near its confluence with the Kaweah River near Lemon Cove, California. The steep walls of its canyon are covered in Blue oak woodland and annual grassland. (May 27th, 2024)

Lime Kiln Creek is a stream within Tulare County in central California. An alternative name for this creek is Dry Creek.

== Course ==
The Lime Kiln Creek headwaters are in the Sierra Nevada and flow into the San Joaquin Valley. The creek discharges into the Kaweah River near Lemon Cove.

== Ecology ==
The Lime Kiln Creek watershed contains many flora and fauna species. Wildflowers are represented by numerous taxa. They included the yellow mariposa lil], Calochortus luteus.

== See also ==
- List of plants of the Sierra Nevada (U.S.)

== Line notes ==
=== References ===
- Watson Swartz Clawson. 1967. Pi on the floor, page 58 of 133 pages
- C. Michael Hogan. 2009. Yellow Mariposa Lily: Calochortus luteus, GlobalTwitcher.com, ed. N. Stromberg
- Alfred Louis Kroeber. 1905. Shoshonean dialects of California, Volume 4, 196 pages
