= Redwood Mountain Grove =

Giant sequoia grove in California, United States

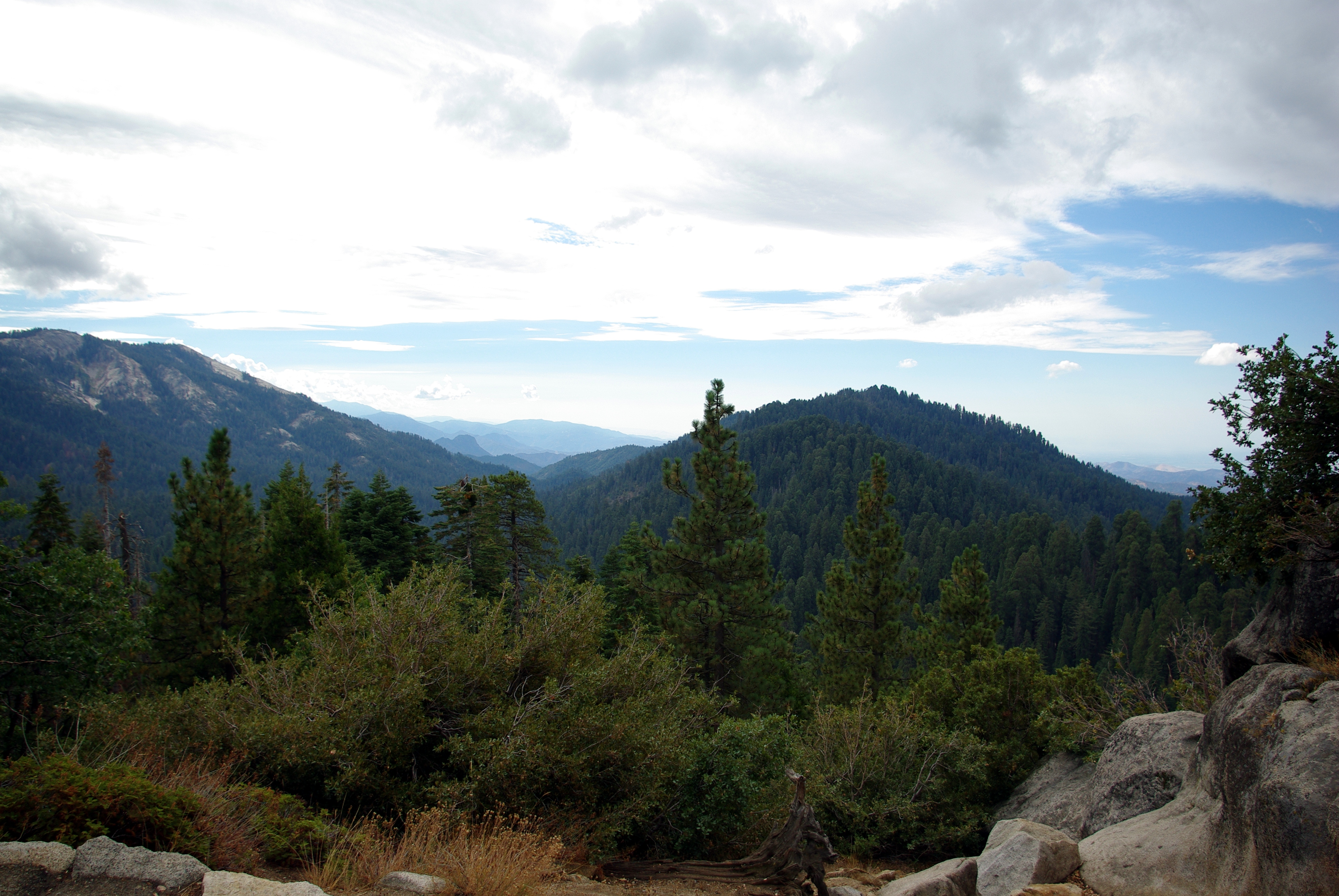
- View of Redwood Mountain Grove area, from Redwood Mountain Overlook in Kings Canyon National Park

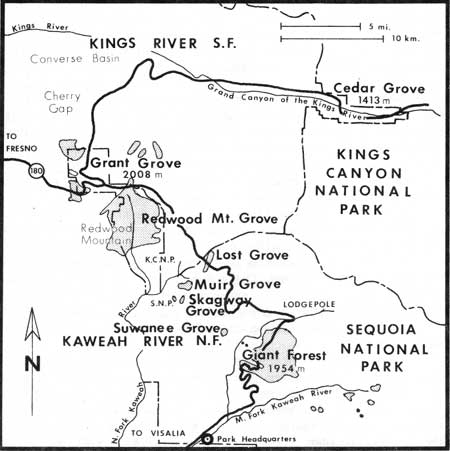
- Map of Redwood Mountain Grove, in relation to nearby giant sequoia groves

Geography
- Location: Tulare County, California, United States
- Coordinates: 36°41′38″N 118°55′08″W
- Elevation: 6,430 feet (1,960 m)
- Area: 3,100 acres (13 km^{2})

Ecology
- Dominant tree species: Sequoiadendron giganteum
- Lesser flora: white fir, sugar pine, incense cedar, ponderosa pine, red fir, and Jeffrey pine

Redwood Mountain Grove is the largest grove of giant sequoia (Sequoiadendron giganteum) trees on earth. It is located in Kings Canyon National Park and Giant Sequoia National Monument on the western slope of California's Sierra Nevada. The grove contains the world's tallest giant sequoia (95 metres (312 ft)). The Hart Tree, one of the 25 largest trees by volume in the world grows here, as did the Roosevelt Tree before its death in the KNP Complex Fire of 2021. The largest tree is the General Sherman Tree in the Giant Forest grove to the southeast.

== The Grove ==
The Redwood Mountain Grove contains the most giant sequoia trees within its area. The area has old-growth giant sequoia groves and other distinctive natural features of the forest for visitors to view and experience. The Redwood Mountain Grove is protected primarily within Kings Canyon National Park, and in Giant Sequoia National Monument.

=== KNP Complex Fire ===
In 2021, the grove burned in the KNP Complex Fire. Although the majority of the grove burned at unchanged to moderate severity, the lower quarter of the grove burned at a high severity, and several other patches within the grove also burned at high severity. Most of the major sequoia mortality from the KNP Complex is thought to have been from this. Of the 2,370 acres (9.6 km^{2}) of the grove, 554 acres (2.24 km^{2}) or 23% burned at high intensity, which would lead to a >75% mortality rate on that area.

== Trails ==
The grove's 3 hiking trails include the Redwood Canyon Trail (central grove), Sugar Bowl Trail (southwest), and the Hart Tree Trail (northwest). Their total 10 miles (16 km) length connect for 3 loop route options. They all begin at the Redwood Canyon Trailhead, via the dirt Forest Service Route 14S75 off the Generals Highway. They give visitors walking/hiking access to see giant sequoia trees within 'wilderness' natural habitats and views of the surrounding canyons and mountains. In Redwood Canyon along Redwood Creek, the grove's understory is dense with other native plant species. The Sugar Bowl is an unusual pure giant sequoia grove on top of Redwood Mountain.

== Plant life and fire studies ==
The grove contains many types of plant life, with the most significant being the giant sequoias. Within the grove one finds many different tree species. The trees that are most prominent in the grove include species such as the white fir, sugar pine, incense cedar, ponderosa pine, red fir, and Jeffrey pine. Each type of these tree species is most numerous within different sections of the grove. The trees have a significant importance to the grove, and natural disasters such as fires have many effects on it. In 1969, parts of the grove were burned to prevent the possibility of other fires from happening, and they aided in restoring the ecosystem and natural life in the area. Fires such as these were also used for scientific research. The fires can have major effects on forests and other wilderness areas. The fires can act as part of the natural cycle for restoring natural life in the environment and ecosystems in the grove and other parks. The Redwood Mountain Grove was involved in several studies that looked at different species of trees present in the grove and the environment surrounding the area. Some of these studies included the investigation of how fires affected the trees and environment in the grove.

The Redwood Mountain Grove was used for the study and analysis of several burns. The burning of small areas in the grove occurred to observe and understand the effects of different fires on the ecosystem. It also presented the benefits to the grove through the examination of the results of the areas burned. They highlighted the effects fires have on the many trees, other natural life, and wilderness of the Redwood Mountain Grove and its surroundings.

== Noteworthy trees ==
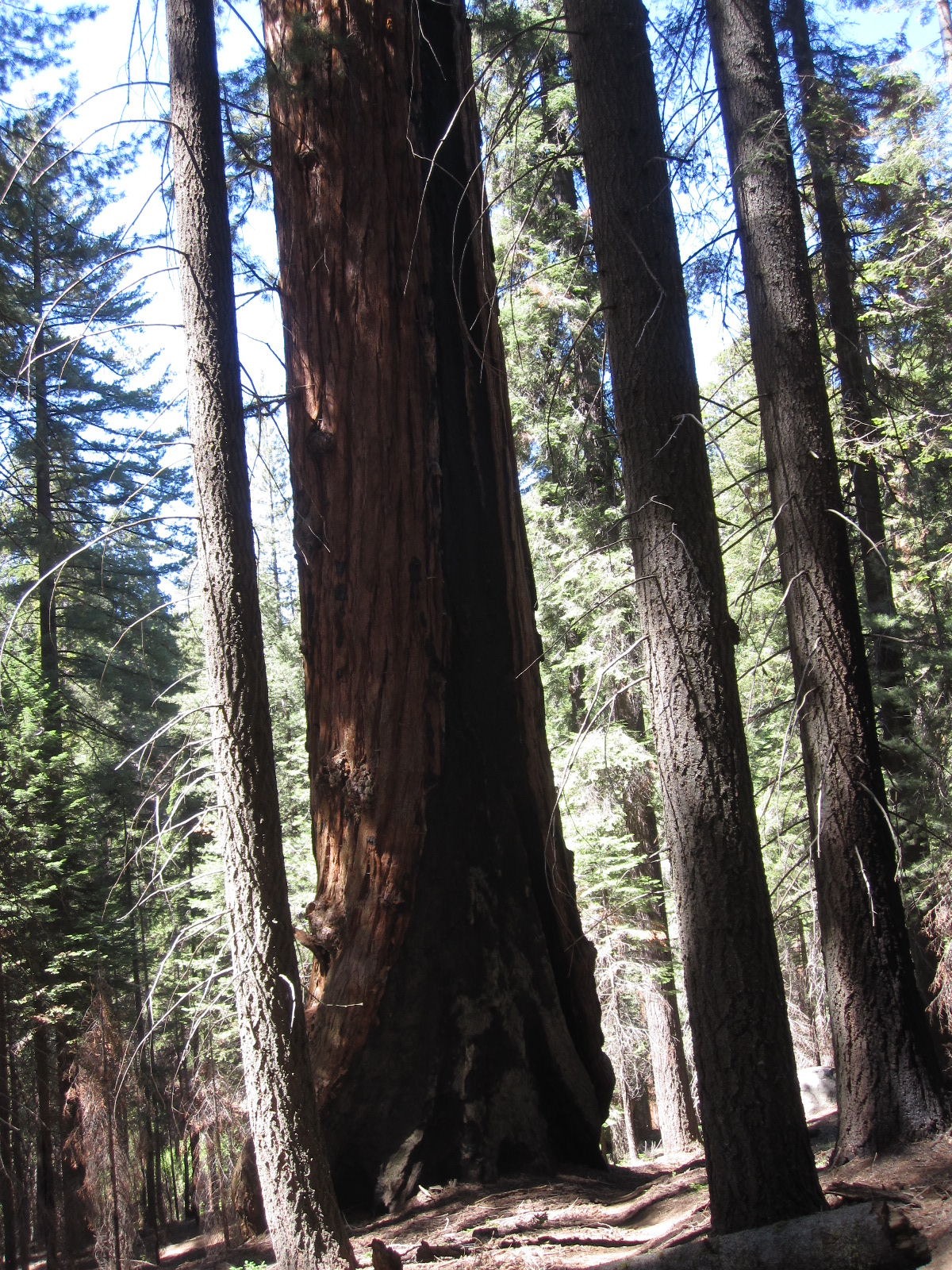
Hart Tree trunk, with basal burn.

Some of the significant trees found in the grove include:

- Roosevelt Tree (deceased) – the largest tree in the grove with a volume of over 1,000 cubic metres (35,000 cu ft).
- Hart Tree – a very tall tree with a volume of around 980 cubic metres (35,000 cu ft), and a huge basal burn. Located near the Roosevelt Tree.
- Unnamed tree – the tallest known giant sequoia tree, at 311 feet (95 m) in height.

== See also ==
- List of giant sequoia groves
- Giant Sequoia (Sequoiadendron giganteum)
