= François Lempérière =

French civil engineer (1926–2026)

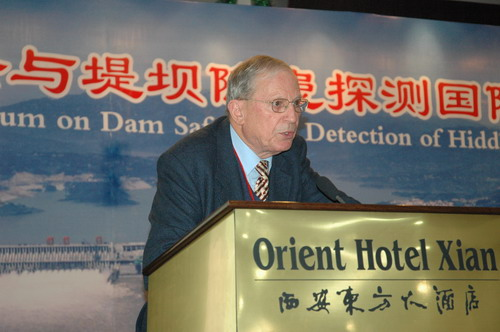
- Lempérière in 2005
- Born: François Marie Henri Charles Lempérière; 9 October 1926; Cherbourg, France
- Died: 26 January 2026 (aged 99); Meudon, France
- Education: École Polytechnique, École des ponts ParisTech
- Occupation: President of HydroCoop (nonprofit organization)
- Engineering career
- Discipline: Civil engineering, dams, nuclear power, invention
- Awards: French Academy of Sciences (1996), ICOLD Lifetime Achievement (2018)

François Marie Henri Charles Lempérière (9 October 1926 – 26 January 2026) was a French civil engineer who built and/or designed 15 dams in France and other countries. He invented solutions such as Fusegates, Piano Keys Weir, Twin Dams and Tidal Gardens. Lempérière received his education at Ecole Polytechnique and Ecole Nationale des Ponts et Chaussées.

== Life and career ==
François Lempérière was a contractor for 40 years in GTM (Grands travaux de Marseille, later GTM Entrepose) where he was in charge from 1960 to 1985 of building large structures in rivers (Rhône, Rhine, Nile, Zambezi) (such as the Cabora Bassa Dam on the Zambezi) or at sea as the Saint-Nazaire Dry Dock in France where have been built the largest world tankers and ships. He was also involved in highways, canals and nuclear plants.

He was chairman of GTM International and after 1982 Deputy General Manager of GTM Entrepose.

Lempérière patented three inventions for GTM Entrepose and its subsidiary Hydroplus.

From 1976, he was a member of five Technical Committees of ICOLD, the International Commission on Large Dams, vice-chairman of the Committee on Technology of Construction, and chairman of the Committee on Cost of Dams.

He drafted eight ICOLD Bulletins about dams construction methods, costs and cost savings .

He was the chairman (1991–1995) of the French Committee on Large Dams now CFBR.

In 1997, he founded, with Pierre Londe, the not for profit International Association “HydroCoop”, which gives free advices especially on floods and dams, hydraulic and tidal energy and energy storage.

Lempérière died in Meudon on 26 January 2026, at the age of 99.

== Commitment ==
=== Floods control during dams construction ===
Lempérière proposed innovative solutions for managing floods during dams construction.

=== Spillways for dams in operation ===
Lempérière proposed four innovative solutions for the dams spillways. The solutions have applied to new dams or existing ones.

- In 1989 the “Fusegates” used for 70 dams in over 10 countries with fuse elements up to 8m high and floods up to 20 000 m3/s.

- In 2003 with A. Ouamane the “Piano Keys Weirs”, a more efficient labyrinth shape of spillways used for 30 dams in 10 countries.

- In 2008, the Concrete Fuse Plugs.

- In 2014, with A. Ouamane an innovative association of above optimized structures which increases fivefold the discharge of a traditional free flow spillway.

=== Tidal energy ===
Lempérière was involved in studies of tidal power plants from 1975 (GEDEM for Électricité de France). In 2014, he proposed an Innovative Solution, the “Tidal Gardens” which may extend the utilization of tidal energy beyond areas of very high tides. This solution has been studied by Electricité de France and presented to ICOLD Congress in 2015 and to ICOLD Awards in 2018.

=== Renewable energy and energy storage ===
From 2009, Lempérière presented various studies of the world energy problems and proposed two innovative solutions for energy storage:

- “Twin Dams” associating two dams along a large river.

- “Emerald Lakes” creating dams at sea along a cliff.

He also proposed solutions for early reduction of fossil and nuclear energy.

== Awards ==
In 1996, Lempérière was awarded by the French Academy of Sciences.

In the ICOLD congress of 2018, he received a special ICOLD Award for a “Life time Achievement”.
