= Three Rivers, California =

Census-designated place in California, United States

- Unincorporated Community; Census Designated Place
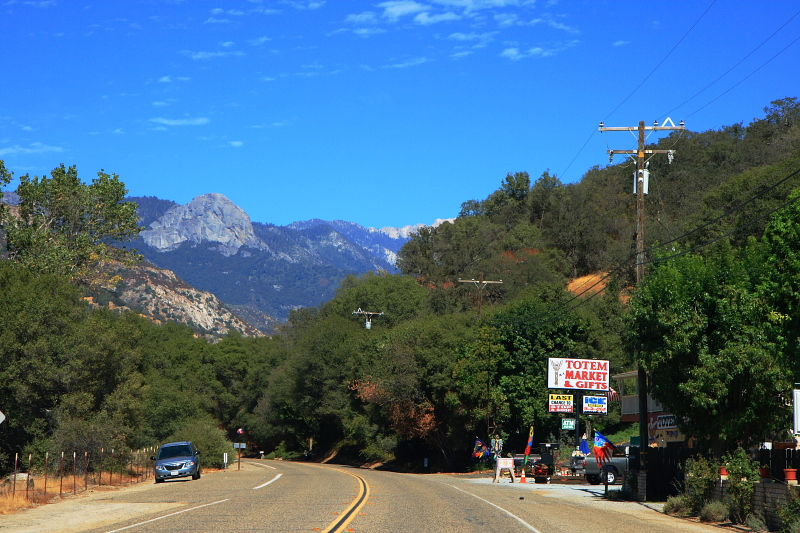
- Three Rivers from Highway 198, looking northeast toward Sequoia National Park. The monolith in left background is Moro Rock.

- Location in Tulare County and the state of California
- Coordinates: 36°27′15″N 118°53′11″W
- Country: United States
- State: California
- County: Tulare

Area
  - Total: 31.087 sq mi (80.514 km^{2})
  - Land: 30.983 sq mi (80.245 km^{2})
  - Water: 0.104 sq mi (0.269 km^{2}) 0.33%
- Elevation: 843 ft (257 m)

Population (2020)
  - Total: 2,053
  - Density: 66.26/sq mi (25.58/km^{2})
- Time zone: UTC−8 (Pacific)
  - Summer (DST): UTC−7 (PDT)
- ZIP code: 93271
- Area code: 559
- FIPS code: 06-78638
- GNIS feature IDs: 1661569, 2409316

Three Rivers is an unincorporated community and census-designated place (CDP) in Tulare County, California, United States. Located in the foothills of the Sierra Nevada at the edge of the San Joaquin Valley, the town is near the entrance to the national parks of Sequoia and Kings Canyon. The town's name comes from its location near the junction of the North, Middle, and South Forks of the Kaweah River.

The population was 2,053 at the 2020 census. The census definition of the area may not precisely correspond to local understanding of the area with the same name.

The two national parks, which border the town to the northeast, are the prime attraction of Three Rivers.

== History ==
=== Kaweah Colony ===
In 1886, a group of utopian socialists founded an intentional community along the upper North Fork of the Kaweah River. Named Kaweah Colony, it was inspired by the ideas of Laurence Gronlund. When Congress created Sequoia National Park they lost their timber claims and in 1891 were ordered off the land.

=== Rhodesian pioneers ===
The Three Rivers cemetery contains the bodies of nine Rhodesian pioneers who lived in Africa ca. 1900 and fought in several wars. The Burnham and Blick families started a 5,000-acre (20 km^{2}) cattle ranch, La Cuesta, in Three Rivers and built homes there. The scenery at Three Rivers is said to be almost identical to that of the Rhodesian kopje country. La Cuesta was sold by John and Judd Blick in 1947 for $90,000.

=== Mineral King and Walt Disney ===
In the 1960s and 70s, Walt Disney had plans to develop a year-round resort at Mineral King. Ultimately, these plans were withdrawn when Mineral King was annexed into Sequoia National Park in 1978.

=== Artists' colony ===
In the 1960s, several local artists held exhibitions in the old Apple House on the North Fork Drive. Some of these artists included Adrian Green, Gene Gray, Caroll Barnes, Frank Treuting, Jean Caulfeild and Pauline Whitsun. Present day artists open their studios every other year for the Three Rivers Artists' Biennial Studio Tour, which was started in 1994 by Elsah Cort (then associated with the Cort Gallery.) More than thirty artists are living and working in Three Rivers, including Mona Fox Selph, James Entz, and Aranga Firstman, who all taught at College of the Sequoias in Visalia, California. Other well-known artists are Martha Widmann, Rick Badgley, Jana Botkin, Nikki Crain, Tina St. John, Nadi Spencer and Martin Pugh.

The Arts Alliance of Three Rivers is the local arts organization, started in 1985, with many local artists and art patrons as members. It sponsors the annual Redbud Arts and Craft Festival every May. It also established the Lorraine Young Scholarship Fund, which awards art scholarships to local Three Rivers graduating high school students. This fund was established by the Arts Alliance in honor of the many years of service Lorraine gave to both the Arts Alliance and to the community of Three Rivers. The Arts Alliance became a 501(c)(3) tax exempt organization in 2010.

== Geography ==
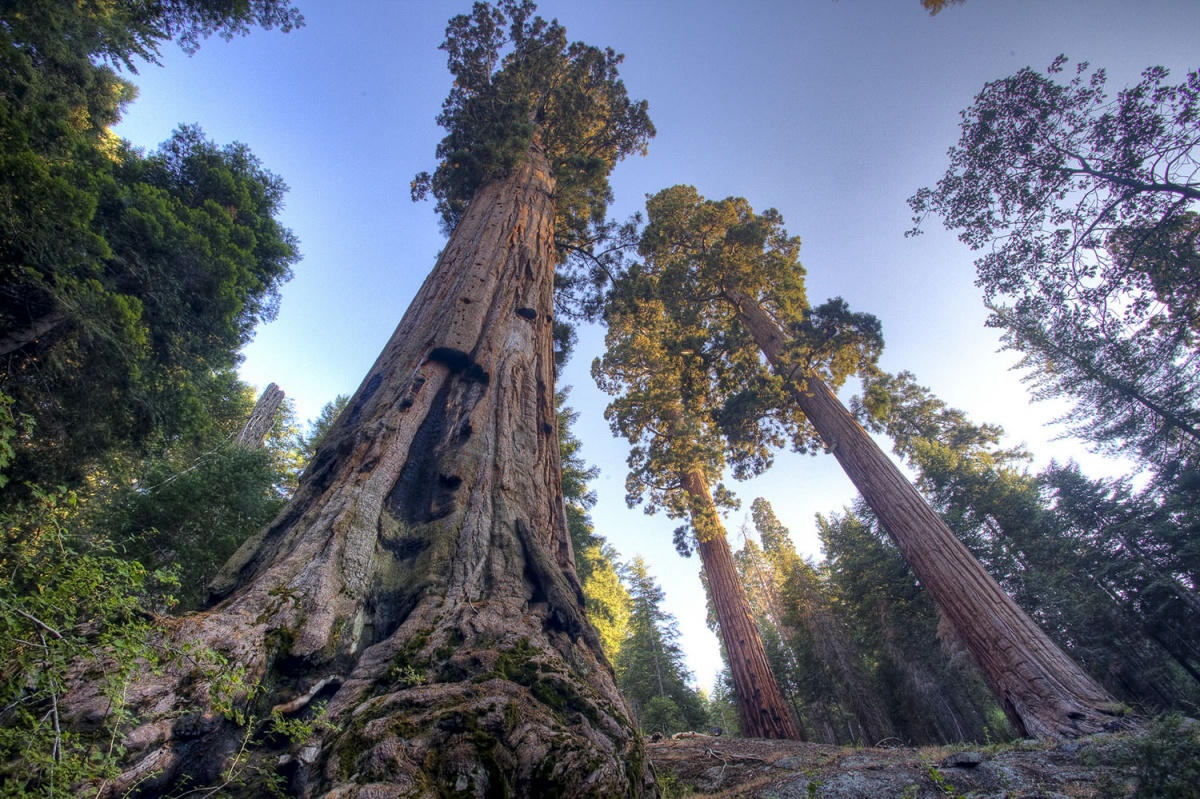
Giant Sequoia grove on Case Mountain, SE of Three Rivers.

Three Rivers is located in the Kaweah River canyon, just above Lake Kaweah. Surrounding terrain is marked by oak woodland forest and foothills. The Kaweah River drainage is a very short river drainage, and quickly terrain climbs from around 1,000 feet (300 m). ASL in Three Rivers to 3,000-5,000 ft ASL on the surrounding hills, and upward to 14,000+ ft ASL at Mt. Whitney, fifty miles to the East. According to the United States Census Bureau, the CDP has a total area of 31.1 square miles (81 km^{2}), of which over 99% was land.

=== Climate ===
According to the Köppen Climate Classification system, Three Rivers has a hot-summer mediterranean climate, abbreviated "Csa" on climate maps. The hottest temperature recorded in Three Rivers was 114 °F (45.6 °C) on August 13, 1996, while the coldest temperature recorded was 16 °F (−8.9 °C) on December 22–23, 1990.

Climate data for Three Rivers, California, 1991–2020 normals, extremes 1971–present
| Month | Jan | Feb | Mar | Apr | May | Jun | Jul | Aug | Sep | Oct | Nov | Dec | Year |
|---|---|---|---|---|---|---|---|---|---|---|---|---|---|
| Record high °F (°C) | 79 (26) | 85 (29) | 89 (32) | 100 (38) | 106 (41) | 112 (44) | 112 (44) | 114 (46) | 109 (43) | 102 (39) | 88 (31) | 79 (26) | 114 (46) |
| Mean maximum °F (°C) | 70.2 (21.2) | 74.1 (23.4) | 79.9 (26.6) | 87.6 (30.9) | 96.3 (35.7) | 104.1 (40.1) | 106.3 (41.3) | 105.0 (40.6) | 101.5 (38.6) | 93.0 (33.9) | 79.4 (26.3) | 69.6 (20.9) | 108.0 (42.2) |
| Mean daily maximum °F (°C) | 58.0 (14.4) | 61.7 (16.5) | 67.0 (19.4) | 72.5 (22.5) | 81.8 (27.7) | 91.1 (32.8) | 97.4 (36.3) | 96.4 (35.8) | 91.5 (33.1) | 79.3 (26.3) | 65.7 (18.7) | 57.6 (14.2) | 76.7 (24.8) |
| Daily mean °F (°C) | 47.0 (8.3) | 50.0 (10.0) | 54.2 (12.3) | 58.4 (14.7) | 66.2 (19.0) | 74.7 (23.7) | 81.2 (27.3) | 80.2 (26.8) | 74.9 (23.8) | 64.2 (17.9) | 53.0 (11.7) | 46.5 (8.1) | 62.5 (17.0) |
| Mean daily minimum °F (°C) | 36.0 (2.2) | 38.3 (3.5) | 41.3 (5.2) | 44.4 (6.9) | 50.7 (10.4) | 58.4 (14.7) | 65.0 (18.3) | 63.9 (17.7) | 58.3 (14.6) | 49.1 (9.5) | 40.3 (4.6) | 35.4 (1.9) | 48.4 (9.1) |
| Mean minimum °F (°C) | 27.4 (−2.6) | 29.7 (−1.3) | 31.3 (−0.4) | 34.6 (1.4) | 41.1 (5.1) | 46.5 (8.1) | 56.4 (13.6) | 55.5 (13.1) | 48.6 (9.2) | 38.6 (3.7) | 30.2 (−1.0) | 26.4 (−3.1) | 24.9 (−3.9) |
| Record low °F (°C) | 20 (−7) | 19 (−7) | 23 (−5) | 28 (−2) | 33 (1) | 39 (4) | 40 (4) | 35 (2) | 39 (4) | 26 (−3) | 23 (−5) | 16 (−9) | 16 (−9) |
| Average precipitation inches (mm) | 4.79 (122) | 3.56 (90) | 4.05 (103) | 2.35 (60) | 0.98 (25) | 0.26 (6.6) | 0.11 (2.8) | 0.01 (0.25) | 0.16 (4.1) | 0.86 (22) | 1.71 (43) | 3.68 (93) | 22.52 (571.75) |
| Average precipitation days (≥ 0.01 in) | 7.7 | 8.9 | 7.9 | 5.9 | 2.9 | 0.7 | 0.6 | 0.2 | 0.9 | 2.7 | 4.9 | 7.9 | 51.2 |
Source 1: NOAA
Source 2: National Weather Service

== Demographics ==
Historical population
| Census | Pop. | Note | %± |
|---|---|---|---|
| 2000 | 2,248 | | — |
| 2010 | 2,182 | | −2.9% |
| 2020 | 2,053 | | −5.9% |
U.S. Decennial Census; 1860–1870 1880-1890; 1900 1910 1920; 1930 1940 1950; 1960 1970 1980; 1990 2000 2010

Three Rivers first appeared as a census designated place in the 2000 U.S. census.

=== 2020 census ===
As of the 2020 census, Three Rivers had a population of 2,053. The population density was 66.3 inhabitants per square mile (25.6/km^{2}). The median age was 56.4 years. The age distribution was 14.1% under the age of 18, 4.7% aged 18 to 24, 16.9% aged 25 to 44, 31.1% aged 45 to 64, and 33.2% who were 65 years of age or older. For every 100 females, there were 93.7 males, and for every 100 females age 18 and over, there were 95.9 males.

The census reported that 99.8% of the population lived in households, 0.2% lived in non-institutionalized group quarters, and no one was institutionalized. There were 963 households, of which 20.1% had children under the age of 18 living in them. Of all households, 48.1% were married-couple households, 6.3% were cohabiting-couple households, 22.1% were households with a male householder and no spouse or partner present, and 23.5% were households with a female householder and no spouse or partner present. About 31.0% of households were one-person households, and 17.7% had someone living alone who was 65 years of age or older. The average household size was 2.13. There were 611 families (63.4% of all households).

There were 1,302 housing units at an average density of 42.0 units per square mile (16.2 units/km^{2}), of which 74.0% were occupied. Of occupied housing units, 77.1% were owner-occupied and 22.9% were renter-occupied. Of all housing units, 26.0% were vacant. The homeowner vacancy rate was 1.7% and the rental vacancy rate was 8.6%.

0.0% of residents lived in urban areas, while 100.0% lived in rural areas.

Racial composition as of the 2020 census
| Race | Number | Percent |
|---|---|---|
| White | 1,692 | 82.4% |
| Black or African American | 6 | 0.3% |
| American Indian and Alaska Native | 26 | 1.3% |
| Asian | 30 | 1.5% |
| Native Hawaiian and Other Pacific Islander | 2 | 0.1% |
| Some other race | 77 | 3.8% |
| Two or more races | 220 | 10.7% |
| Hispanic or Latino (of any race) | 273 | 13.3% |

=== Income and poverty ===
In 2023, the US Census Bureau estimated that the median household income was $83,614, and the per capita income was $58,766. About 0.0% of families and 5.3% of the population were below the poverty line.

=== 2010 census ===
The 2010 United States census reported that Three Rivers had a population of 2,182. The population density was 49.0 people per square mile (18.9 people/km^{2}). The racial make-up was 1,976 (90.6%) White, 7 (0.3%) African American, 27 (1.2%) Native American, 31 (1.4%) Asian, 1 (0.0%) Pacific Islander, 75 (3.4%) from other races and 65 (3.0%) from two or more races. Hispanic or Latino of any race were 212 people (9.7%).

The Census reported that 2,177 people (99.8% of the population) lived in households, 0 (0%) lived in non-institutionalized group quarters and 5 (0.2%) were institutionalized.

There were 1,018 households, of which 207 (20.3%) had children under the age of 18 living in them, 519 (51.0%) were opposite-sex married couples living together, 65 (6.4%) had a female householder with no husband present, 33 (3.2%) had a male householder with no wife present. There were 35 (3.4%) unmarried opposite-sex partnerships, and 10 (1.0%) same-sex married couples or partnerships. 341 households (33.5%) were made up of individuals, and 159 (15.6%) had someone living alone who was 65 years of age or older. The average household size was 2.14. There were 617 families (60.6% of all households); the average family size was 2.71.

354 people (16.2%) were under the age of 18, 90 people (4.1%) aged 18 to 24, 369 people (16.9%) aged 25 to 44, 837 people (38.4%) aged 45 to 64 and 532 people (24.4%) who were 65 years of age or older. The median age was 52.3 years. For every 100 females, there were 98.2 males. For every 100 females age 18 and over, there were 93.4 males.

There were 1,312 housing units at an average density of 29.5 units per square mile (11.4 units/km^{2}), of which 741 (72.8%) were owner-occupied and 277 (27.2%) were occupied by renters. The homeowner vacancy rate was 3.1%; the rental vacancy rate was 7.6%. 1,604 people (73.5% of the population) lived in owner-occupied housing units and 573 people (26.3%) lived in rental housing units.

== Politics ==
In the state legislature, Three Rivers is located in the 12th senatorial district, represented by Republican Shannon Grove, and in the 32nd Assembly district, represented by Republican Stan Ellis.

In the United States House of Representatives, Three Rivers is in California's 20th congressional district, represented by Republican Vince Fong.

== Education ==
It is within the Three Rivers Union Elementary School District and the Woodlake Unified School District for grades 9-12.

- Three Rivers Union School District (K-8, average attendance: 157 students)
- Woodlake Union High School (9–12), Three Rivers Students usually go to high school in Woodlake.

Three Rivers is the location of the Diocese of Fresno's St. Anthony Retreat Center and Santa Teresita Youth Conference Center, and of Riata Ranch International, a Western Performance Arts Training Facility and home of the Riata Ranch Cowboy Girls.

Three Rivers was one site of a handful of U.S. boarding schools run by the Hare Krishna movement. These schools, called "gurukulas", were closed by the mid-1980s. Other locations included Los Angeles, Moundsville in West Virginia and Dallas.

== Notable people ==
- Mary Harris - keyboardist, singer, songwriter, arranger, producer.
- Jeremy Railton (1944–2025) - art director, costume and production designer.
- Adin Ross - internet personality, online streamer.
- Curt Siodmak (1902–2000) - novelist and screenwriter.
