= List of Hypochilidae species =

This page lists all described species of the spider family Hypochilidae as of Jan. 6, 2017.

== Ectatosticta ==
Ectatosticta Simon, 1892

- Ectatosticta davidi (Simon, 1889) (type species) — China
- Ectatosticta deltshevi Platnick & Jäger, 2009 — China

== Hypochilus ==
Hypochilus Marx, 1888

- Hypochilus bernardino Catley, 1994 — USA
- Hypochilus bonneti Gertsch, 1964 — USA
- Hypochilus coylei Platnick, 1987 — USA
- Hypochilus gertschi Hoffman, 1963 — USA
- Hypochilus jemez Catley, 1994 — USA
- Hypochilus kastoni Platnick, 1987 — USA
- Hypochilus petrunkevitchi Gertsch, 1958 — USA
- Hypochilus pococki Platnick, 1987 — USA
- Hypochilus sheari Platnick, 1987 — USA
- Hypochilus thorelli Marx, 1888 (type species) — USA
