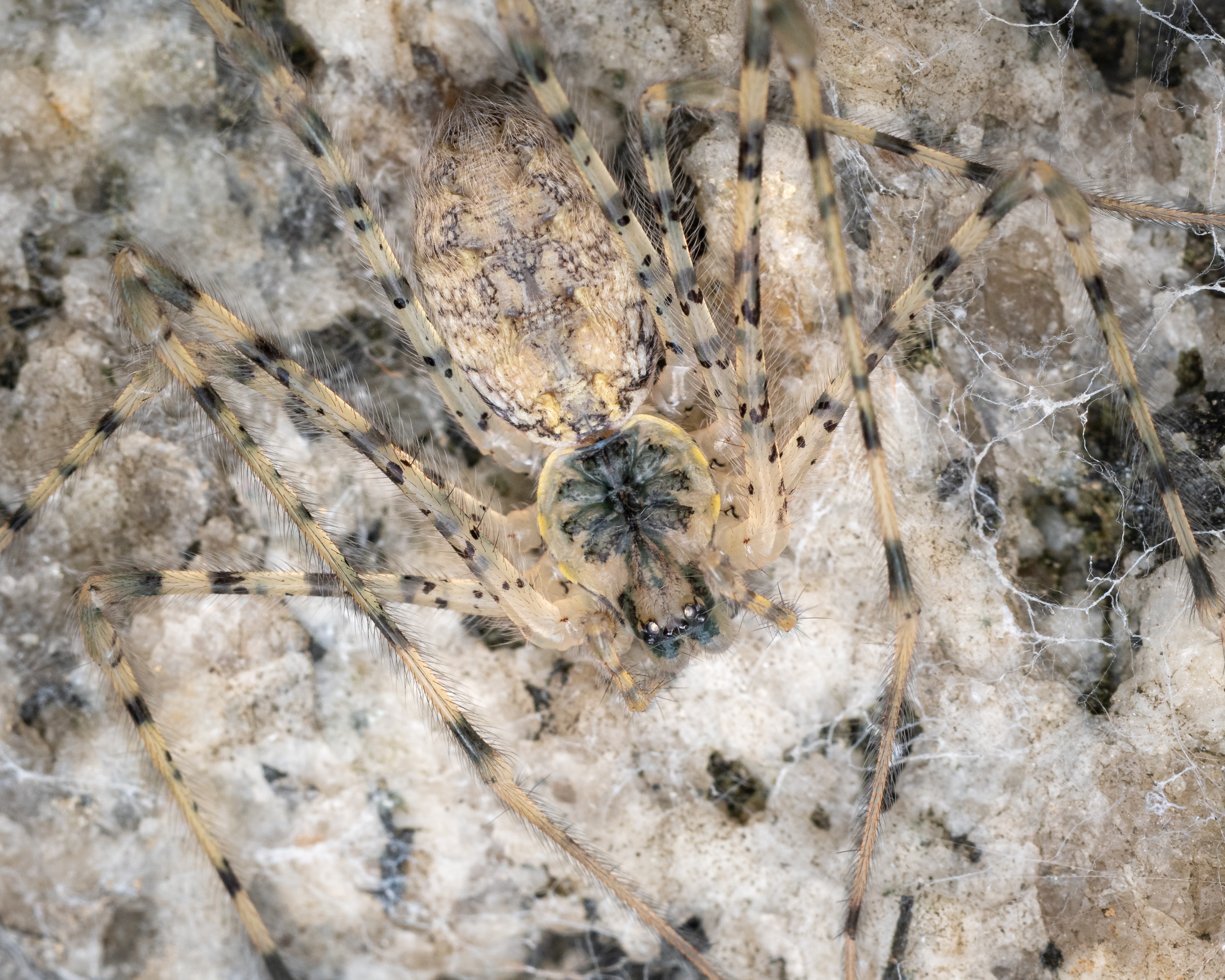
- female

Scientific classification
- Kingdom: Animalia
- Phylum: Arthropoda
- Subphylum: Chelicerata
- Class: Arachnida
- Order: Araneae
- Infraorder: Araneomorphae
- Family: Hypochilidae
- Genus: Hypochilus
- Species: H. xomote

Binomial name
- Hypochilus xomote Hedin & Ciaccio, 2022

= Hypochilus xomote =

Species of spider

Hypochilus xomote is a species of lampshade spider in the family Hypochilidae, endemic to the southern Sierra Nevada mountains of California. Described in 2022 by Hedin & Ciaccio, it represents the southernmost known populations of Hypochilus spiders in the Sierra Nevada and is considered a short-range endemic species.

== Etymology ==
The specific name xomote derives from the Native American Yowlumni tribal word meaning "south", reflecting its position as the southernmost Hypochilus population in the Californian Sierra Nevada.

== Description ==
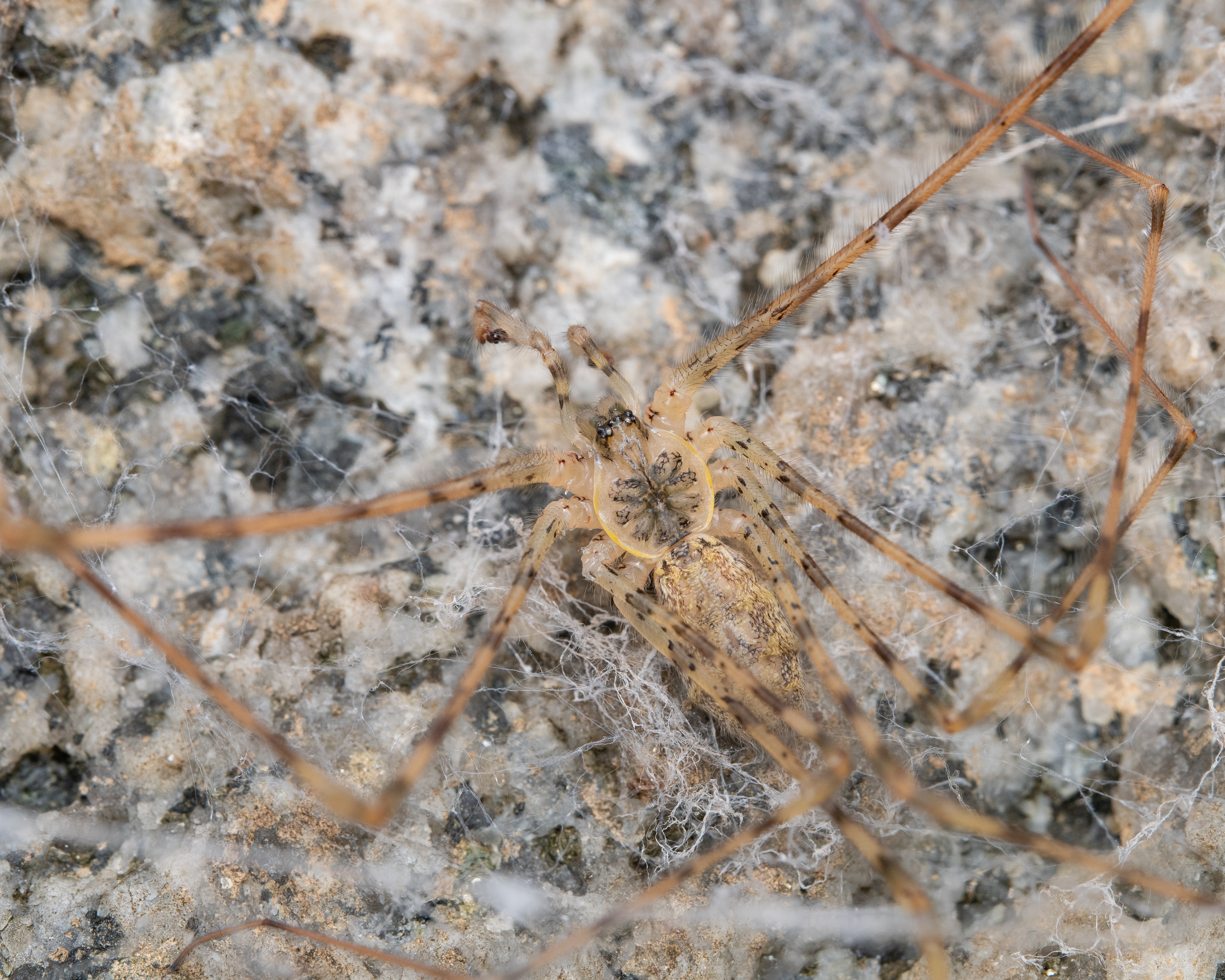
Male Hypochilus xomote spider in situ

Hypochilus xomote exhibits the characteristic features of the genus Hypochilus, with males measuring approximately 7.5 mm in body length and females reaching 11.8 mm. The cephalothorax is pale yellow to white with dusky markings, and the chelicerae are similarly colored. Males possess a distinctive palpal conductor that is loosely whorled with a small distal projection. Females have convoluted spermathecal ducts with relatively large receptacles.

== Distribution and habitat ==
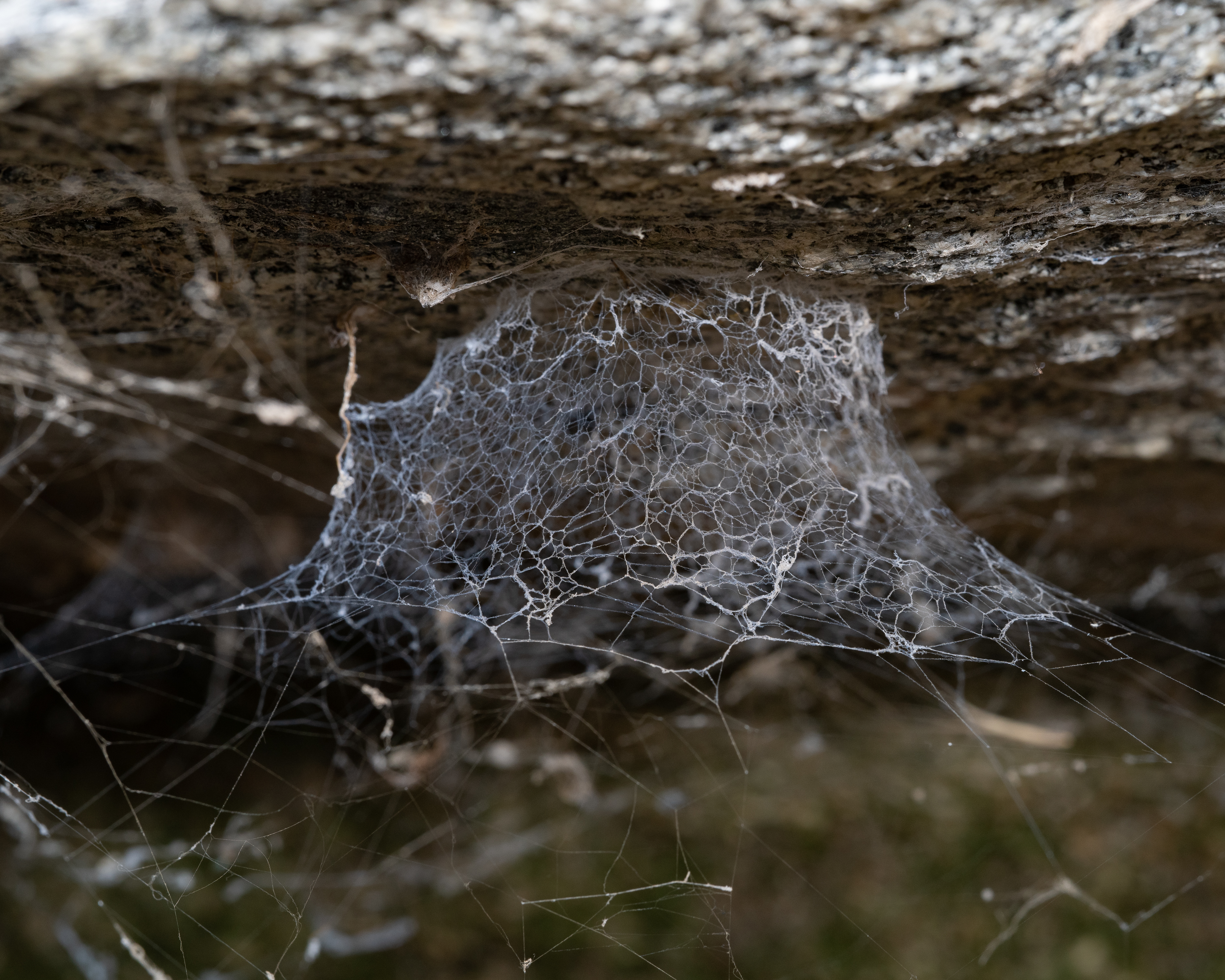
Hypochilus xomote lampshade web

Hypochilus xomote is known exclusively from the upper Tule River and upper Cedar Creek drainage basins in the southern Sierra Nevada of California. The species is predicted to also occur in the intervening White River drainage, though collection efforts there have been unsuccessful.

These spiders inhabit shaded granite boulder formations, abandoned mine shafts, and stream culverts, typically near water sources within coniferous or mixed oak-conifer forests. They construct their characteristic lampshade-shaped webs in these rocky microhabitats. The species shows a preference for shaded areas on large granite boulders, particularly those facing away from direct sunlight.
