= Schafer Dam =

Success Dam
- Location of Success Dam in California
- Official name: Richard L. Schafer Dam
- Country: United States
- Location: Porterville, California
- Coordinates: 36°03′38″N 118°55′09″W
- Construction began: 1958; 68 years ago
- Opening date: 1961; 65 years ago

Dam and spillways
- Type of dam: Embankment
- Impounds: Tule River
- Height: 156 ft (48 m)
- Length: 3,490 ft (1,060 m)
- Elevation at crest: 652.5 ft (198.9 m)
- Dam volume: 5,560,000 yd^{3} (4,250,000 m^{3})

Reservoir
- Creates: Lake Success
- Total capacity: 82,300 acre⋅ft (101,500,000 m^{3})
- Catchment area: 393 mi^{2} (1,020 km^{2})
- Surface area: 2,450 acres (990 ha)

Schafer Dam—formerly Success Dam, prior to 2019—is a dam across the Tule River in Tulare County, California, United States. Serving mainly for flood control and irrigation, the dam is an earthen embankment structure 156 feet (48 m) high and 3,490 feet (1,060 m) long. The dam lies about 5 miles (8.0 km) east of Porterville and impounds Lake Success, with a built-capacity of 82,300 acre-feet (0.1015 km^{3}), and an operational capacity of 28,800 acre-feet (0.0355 km^{3}) due to dam stability concerns.

== History ==
The dam was initially authorized by the Flood Control Act of 1944 as part of an extensive system of dams and levees to provide flood protection in the Tulare Lake basin of the southern San Joaquin Valley. The U.S. Army Corps of Engineers (USACE) began construction of Success Dam in 1958 and finished in 1961, with the official dedication on May 18, 1962.

The Corps of Engineers found in 1999 that the alluvial deposits that form the foundations of the dam were unstable and that the dam would be at a high risk of failure in the event of an earthquake. In 2006, new regulations were passed that limited long-term water storage in the reservoir to 28,800 acre-feet (0.0355 km^{3}), 35% of capacity. A proposed $500 million project would increase the thickness of the dam by 350 feet (110 m) so that it could better withstand a quake in the region.

In August 2019, the 116th Congress of the United States enacted PL-116-41 which said (in part) that the Success Dam in Tulare County, California, shall hereafter be known and designated as the ‘‘Richard L. Schafer Dam’’.

In January 2025, the dam received national attention after President Trump signed orders to release significantly more water from several Federal dams to put more water in Los Angeles Basin water reservoirs, following the destructive Los Angeles wildfires earlier that month. According to the Los Angeles Times, "it was not clear where federal officials intended to send the water that was being released from the dams." Outflows from the dam discharge into the Tulare Lake bed almost 200 miles (320 km) north of Los Angeles, and there is no infrastructure to deliver Tule River water to Southern California.

== See also ==
- 2025 water release from Lake Kaweah and Lake Success
- List of reservoirs and dams in California
