= Lake Success =

Lake Success can refer to:

- Lake Success (California), lake in California
- Lake Success, New York, village in New York
- Lake Success, a novel by American author Gary Shteyngart
