= 2025 water release from Lake Kaweah and Lake Success =

The 2025 water release from Lake Kaweah and Lake Success occurred in January of that year, when United States president Donald Trump ordered water to be released from the California reservoirs at Lake Kaweah (Terminus Dam) and Lake Success (Schafer Dam). The stated reason for the release was to provide water to Southern California to assist with 2025 California wildfires such as the Palisades Fire and Eaton Fire, but the water never reached Southern California.

== Army Corps of Engineers ==
Terminus Dam and Schafer Dam are under the control of the United States Army Corps of Engineers, which is why Donald Trump had the authority to order the release. The Army Corps had discretion to conduct the release because the amount of water in the two reservoirs was higher than the standard amount. A former Army Corps overseer of these dams, Calvin Foster, told reporters that "releasing some water was warranted because a storm was forecast to bring rain and snow to the state in the days ahead."

The release order by the Army Corps bypassed the usual process for coordinating such releases with other agencies, but a spokesperson for the Corps stated that they did coordinate "with local, state and federal stakeholders and reduced the planned rate of water outflow in response to their concerns." In particular, the projected release of 5.2 billion gallons of water was cut by more than half.

Initially, water probably flowed out at approximately 5,000 cubic feet per second. Later, this was reduced to 1,000 cubic feet per second at one dam and 1,500 cubic feet per second at the other dam. On February 2, the water release was stopped completely. In total, 2.2 billion gallons of water were released.

The Corps explained via its spokesperson that the reduced release of water was consistent with Trump's January 24 executive order titled "Emergency Measures to Provide Water Resources in California and Improve Disaster Response in Certain Areas". That executive order was one of the reasons why the release of water occurred; Colonel Chad Caldwell, commander of the Corps' Sacramento district, told reporters that the "release was done to satisfy Trump's executive order."

The executive order had been issued on January 24, 2025, which was four days after Trump took office. As of January 24, the destructive wildfires in Southern California were 70% contained. The release of water began six days later, on January 30, and ended on February 2, 2025. The fires were fully contained as of January 31, 2025, despite local water shortages.

== Overview and reactions ==
Although water was released to help combat the January 2025 Southern California wildfires, that water never reached Southern California because these reservoirs release their water to the Tulare Lake basin, not to Southern California. Directing the water to Southern California is possible, but would require the use of a connection point called the Kern River Intertie that is rarely used, and would require significant planning and coordination with other agencies.

Water in Lake Kaweah and Lake Success is typically conserved for release to farmers during the summer. Releasing it during winter was perceived by opponents of the release as wasteful. U.S. senator Alex Padilla (D-CA) called the water release a publicity stunt. According to the White House, “President Trump offered help, and did help, yet California failed to ensure the water went where it was needed."

== Alternate attempt ==
A few days before the water release, DOGE representatives repeatedly called the Bureau of Reclamation, saying that they had received an order from the president to turn on the water pumps at the Jones Pumping Plant near Sacramento. However, according to California's state Department of Water Resources, the pumps (which are federally operated) could not be turned on because they were offline for planned PG&E line maintenance. Then the Trump administration flew two DOGE representatives, Bryton Shang and Tyler Hassen, to California, where they attempted to physically turn on the pumps themselves, and requested to have a photo taken of them doing it. However, they were unable to do this, partly because the pumps were still offline and partly because Shang was not an employee of the government and so could not be allowed in the control room per federal regulations. Instead, they took a photo elsewhere in the facility and posted it after the pumps were turned back on as scheduled.

== See also ==
- 2025 in California
- First 100 days of Donald Trump's second presidency
- Response to the Department of Government Efficiency
