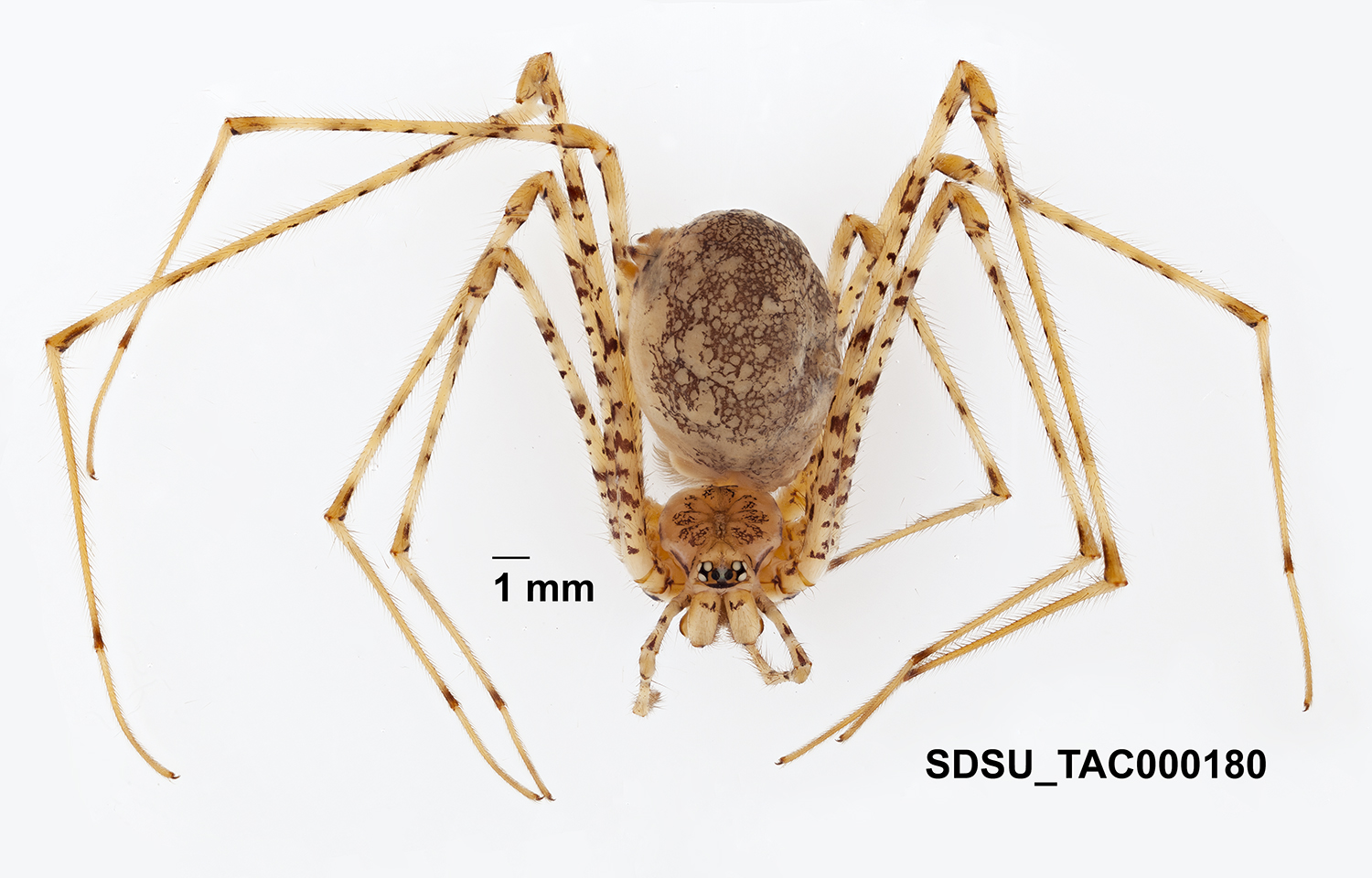

Scientific classification
- Kingdom: Animalia
- Phylum: Arthropoda
- Subphylum: Chelicerata
- Class: Arachnida
- Order: Araneae
- Infraorder: Araneomorphae
- Family: Hypochilidae
- Genus: Hypochilus
- Species: H. gertschi

Binomial name
- Hypochilus gertschi Hoffman, 1963

= Hypochilus gertschi =

Species of spider

Hypochilus gertschi, or Gertsch's lampshade-web spider, is a species of lampshade weaver in the family Hypochilidae. It is found in the United States.
