= Hypochilus bonneti =

Scientific classification
- Kingdom: Animalia
- Phylum: Arthropoda
- Subphylum: Chelicerata
- Class: Arachnida
- Order: Araneae
- Infraorder: Araneomorphae
- Family: Hypochilidae
- Genus: Hypochilus
- Species: H. bonneti

Binomial name
- Hypochilus bonneti Gertsch, 1964

Species of spider

Hypochilus bonneti is a species of lampshade weaver in the spider family Hypochilidae. It is found in the United States.
