= Jessica Govea Thorbourne =

Labor activist, union leader and educator (1947-2005)

- Born: 1947; Porterville, California, US
- Died: January 23, 2005 (aged 57–58); West Orange, New Jersey, US
- Political party: Democrat

Jessica Govea Thorbourne (1947 – January 23, 2005) was a labor activist, United Farm Worker union leader, and educator. She is best known for her lifelong efforts to achieve justice, equality, education, and economic opportunity for Latino laborers. At age 58, she died from breast cancer in West Orange, New Jersey. However, she believed that the true source of her illness later in life was related to the damaging pesticides that she had worked with for years.

== Early life ==
Govea Thorbourne was born in 1947 in Porterville, California to Juan and Margaret Govea, who were migrant workers. By the age of two, she had already begun working in the fields. At an early age, she began leading boycotts, such as her very successful grape boycott in Canada. Govea Thorbourne graduated valedictorian from Bakersfield High School. She attended college for one year before deciding to join forces with Cesar Chavez in the United Farm Workers Union.

== Career ==
Govea Thorbourne began working with the United Farm Workers Union at the age of 19; however, she had been working with other migrant workers at the age of 2. Govea Thorbourne worked with the United Farm Workers and held many positions. Her most notable position was the national director of organizing. She then went on to become a labor educator at Rutgers University and Cornell University. While working for the union, she worked very closely with Cesar Chavez.

== Work with the United Farm Workers Union ==
Govea Thorbourne began working closely with Cesar Chavez for the United Farm Workers (UFW) at age 19, since her father was a Mexican-American community leader and worked closely with Chavez. At age 21, she led boycotts in Canada that led to UFW Union contracts with a California grape company. Additionally, she worked to raise awareness for Latino fieldworkers' exposure to dangerous pesticides. Govea Thorbourne later served as the national director of organizing for UFW. In 1977, she was elected a member of the UFW executive board.
