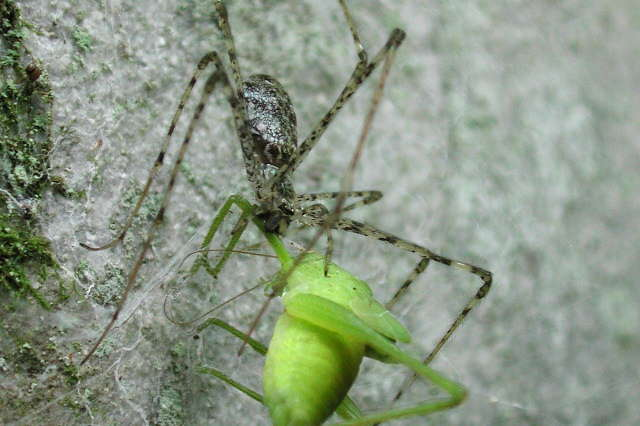
- Feeding on a katydid

Scientific classification
- Kingdom: Animalia
- Phylum: Arthropoda
- Subphylum: Chelicerata
- Class: Arachnida
- Order: Araneae
- Infraorder: Araneomorphae
- Family: Hypochilidae
- Genus: Hypochilus
- Species: H. thorelli

Binomial name
- Hypochilus thorelli Marx, 1888

= Hypochilus thorelli =

Species of spider

Hypochilus thorelli is a species of spider in the family Hypochilidae. Unlike almost all other araneomorph or "true" spiders, members of the family have four book lungs. They are often called "lampshade spiders" because of the shape of their webs which are usually built underneath ledges or projections. H. thorelli is found in the southern Appalachian Mountains of the eastern United States.

== Description ==
The female has a cephalothorax about 5.5 mm long and an abdomen (opisthosoma) about 9 mm long. The male is smaller, with a cephalothorax of about 4 mm and an abdomen of about 6 mm. Both sexes have very long legs: the first leg of the female is about 63 mm long; the male has longer and thinner legs, the first leg being about 80 mm long. The cephalothorax of both sexes is light yellowish grey, with a darker star shape underneath. The upper surface of the abdomen is greyish with irregular black lines and marks; the under surface is whiter. There are eight eyes; two clusters of three each on either side and two more central eyes. Both a cribellum and a calamistrum are present.

Like all species in the family Hypochilidae, Hypochilus thorelli has four book lungs, like mesothele and mygalomorph spiders and unlike almost all other araneomorph spiders. The outlines of the lungs are visible on the under surface of the abdomen.

== Web ==
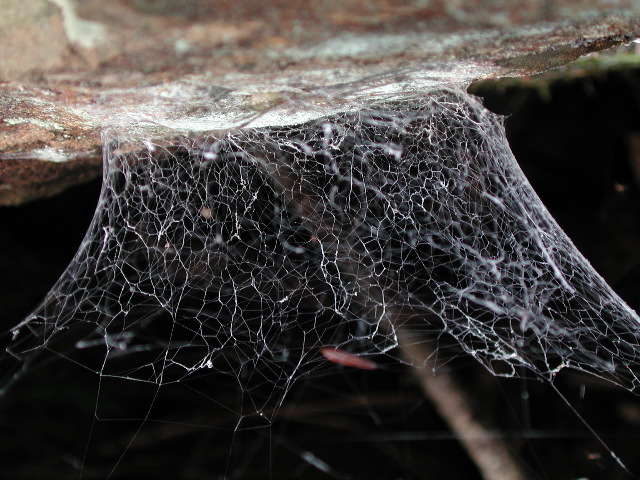
Web of an undetermined species of Hypochilus in its 'normal' orientation

Like other members of the family, Hypochilus thorelli makes a "lampshade-shaped" web. The web is usually fixed to the underside of an overhang, or sometimes on a vertical surface. The spider first makes a circular "mat" of silk and then uses this as the top of a cylindrical web that widens downwards and is open at the bottom like a lampshade. The web is held taut by threads of silk connecting it to the substrate below. The stickiness of the web is created by extremely fine strands of cribellate silk, not by glue. The spider rests at the top of the web, with its long legs outstretched and touching the edges of the cylinder. In one series of observations, prey caught in the web was roughly equally divided between flying insects (e.g. crane flies) and crawling arthropods (e.g. harvestmen, ants). Prey are killed by biting and are not wrapped in silk before being consumed.

== Taxonomy ==
Hypochilus thorelli was first described by George Marx in 1888, the genus Hypochilus being erected for this purpose. The genus name is derived from the Greek hypo, below, and cheilos, lip, referring to the position of the labium. The species name honours Tamerlan Thorell. The unique combination of features – four book lungs like mygalomorph spiders but a cribellum like araneomorph spiders – led to Marx placing it in not only a new genus but also a new family, Hypochilidae.

== Distribution and habitat ==
Hypochilus thorelli is native to the southern Appalachian Mountains, being found in North Carolina, Tennessee, and over the borders into Kentucky, Alabama, Georgia, and South Carolina. Its preferred habitat has been described as "stream gorges in humid deciduous forests at elevations of 600 to 1100 m". Humidity and shade are important requirements, as are suitable overhanging or vertical surfaces for web-building.
