= East Porterville, California =

East Porterville
- unincorporated community census-designated place
- Nickname: East Side
- Location in Tulare County and the state of California

- Location in the United States
- Coordinates: 36°3′22″N 118°59′2″W
- Country: United States
- State: California
- County: Tulare

Government
  - State legislators: Sen. Melissa Hurtado (D); Assm. Alexandra Macedo (R)
  - U. S. rep.: David Valadao (R)

Area
  - Total: 2.122 sq mi (5.496 km^{2})
  - Land: 2.122 sq mi (5.496 km^{2})
  - Water: 0 sq mi (0 km^{2}) 0%
- Elevation: 486 ft (148 m)

Population (2020)
  - Total: 5,549
  - Density: 2,615/sq mi (1,010/km^{2})
- Time zone: UTC-8 (Pacific (PST))
  - Summer (DST): UTC-7 (PDT)
- ZIP code: 93257, 93258
- Area code: 559
- FIPS code: 06-21012
- GNIS feature ID: 1867018

East Porterville is an unincorporated community in Tulare County, California, United States. Adjacent to the city of Porterville, the community lies by the Sierra Nevada foothills. The population was 5,549 at the 2020 census, down from 7,331 at the 2010 census. For statistical purposes, the United States Census Bureau has defined East Porterville as a census-designated place (CDP). The census definition of the area may not precisely correspond to local understanding of the area with the same name.

== Geography ==
East Porterville is located at 36°3′22″N 118°59′2″W (36.056101, -118.983836).

According to the United States Census Bureau, the CDP has a total area of 2.1 square miles (5.4 km^{2}), all land.

== Demographics ==
Historical population
Census	Pop.	Note	%±
1960	3,538		—
1970	4,042		14.2%
1980	5,218		29.1%
1990	5,790		11.0%
2000	6,730		16.2%
2010	7,331		8.9%
2020	5,549		−24.3%
U.S. Decennial Census; 1860–1870 1880-1890; 1900 1910 1920; 1930 1940 1950; 1960 1970 1980; 1990 2000 2010

East Porterville first appeared as an unincorporated place in the 1960 U.S. census; and then as a census designated place in the 1980 U.S. census.

=== 2020 census ===
As of the 2020 census, East Porterville had a population of 5,549 and a population density of 2,615.0 inhabitants per square mile (1,009.7/km^{2}). The median age was 28.2 years.

The age distribution was 33.1% under the age of 18, 11.7% aged 18 to 24, 25.2% aged 25 to 44, 19.8% aged 45 to 64, and 10.2% aged 65 or older. For every 100 females, there were 103.4 males, and for every 100 females age 18 and over, there were 104.5 males.

The census reported that 99.7% of residents lived in households, 0.3% lived in non-institutionalized group quarters, and none were institutionalized. In addition, 96.1% of residents lived in urban areas and 3.9% lived in rural areas.

There were 1,399 households, of which 51.6% had children under the age of 18 living in them. Of all households, 48.2% were married-couple households, 8.9% were cohabiting couple households, 24.0% had a female householder with no spouse or partner present, and 18.8% had a male householder with no spouse or partner present. About 14.6% of households were one-person households, and 6.9% had someone living alone who was 65 years of age or older. The average household size was 3.96, and 1,135 were families (81.1% of all households).

There were 1,448 housing units at an average density of 682.4 units per square mile (263.5 units/km^{2}), of which 1,399 (96.6%) were occupied. Of occupied units, 51.5% were owner-occupied and 48.5% were occupied by renters. The homeowner vacancy rate was 0.8%, and the rental vacancy rate was 2.0%.

Racial composition as of the 2020 census
Race	Number	Percent
White	1,509	27.2%
Black or African American	17	0.3%
American Indian and Alaska Native	201	3.6%
Asian	66	1.2%
Native Hawaiian and Other Pacific Islander	100	1.8%
Some other race	2,731	49.2%
Two or more races	925	16.7%
Hispanic or Latino (of any race)	4,474	80.6%

=== Income and poverty ===
In 2023, the US Census Bureau estimated that the median household income was $38,482, and the per capita income was $12,788. About 39.7% of families and 42.5% of the population were below the poverty line.

=== 2010 census ===
The 2010 United States census reported that East Porterville had a population of 7,331. The population density was 2,256.6 inhabitants per square mile (871.3/km^{2}). The racial makeup of East Porterville was 3,660 (54.1%) White, 65 (1.0%) African American, 153 (2.3%) Native American, 102 (1.5%) Asian, 58 (0.9%) Pacific Islander, 2,431 (35.9%) from other races, and 298 (4.4%) from two or more races. Hispanic or Latino of any race were 4,930 persons (72.9%).

The Census reported that 6,760 people (99.9% of the population) lived in households, 7 (0.1%) lived in non-institutionalized group quarters, and 0 (0%) were institutionalized.

There were 1,637 households, out of which 993 (60.7%) had children under the age of 18 living in them, 884 (54.0%) were opposite-sex married couples living together, 325 (19.9%) had a female householder with no husband present, 179 (10.9%) had a male householder with no wife present. There were 173 (10.6%) unmarried opposite-sex partnerships, and 9 (0.5%) same-sex married couples or partnerships. 173 households (10.6%) were made up of individuals, and 61 (3.7%) had someone living alone who was 65 years of age or older. The average household size was 4.13. There were 1,388 families (84.8% of all households); the average family size was 4.36.

The population was spread out, with 2,476 people (36.6%) under the age of 18, 858 people (12.7%) aged 18 to 24, 1,683 people (24.9%) aged 25 to 44, 1,326 people (19.6%) aged 45 to 64, and 424 people (6.3%) who were 65 years of age or older. The median age was 25.4 years. For every 100 females, there were 106.0 males. For every 100 females age 18 and over, there were 108.1 males.

There were 1,750 housing units at an average density of 583.6 units per square mile (225.3 units/km^{2}), of which 775 (47.3%) were owner-occupied, and 862 (52.7%) were occupied by renters. The homeowner vacancy rate was 1.3%; the rental vacancy rate was 4.7%. 3,072 people (45.4% of the population) lived in owner-occupied housing units and 3,688 people (54.5%) lived in rental housing units.

== Infrastructure ==
In August 2014 during 2012–14 North American drought, East Porterville was experiencing "Exceptional" drought conditions, as was the entirety of Tulare County. The Fresno Bee reported that close to 1000 homes were without water due to a declining water table and dependence on shallow wells. Although scores of people had been calling public agencies such as the county, the next-door city of Porterville, and the local water district to report dry wells, authorities have not realized the extent of the problem since the agencies did not track private wells.

== Government ==
In the California State Legislature, East Porterville is in the 16th senatorial district, represented by Democrat Melissa Hurtado, and the 33rd Assembly district, represented by Republican Alexandra Macedo.

In the United States House of Representatives, East Porterville is in California's 22nd congressional district, represented by Republican David Valadao

== Education ==
Western portions of the CDP are in the Porterville Unified School District (PUSD) for all grade levels, K-12. Eastern portions are in the Alta Vista Elementary School District, while PUSD covers that portion only for secondary grades.
