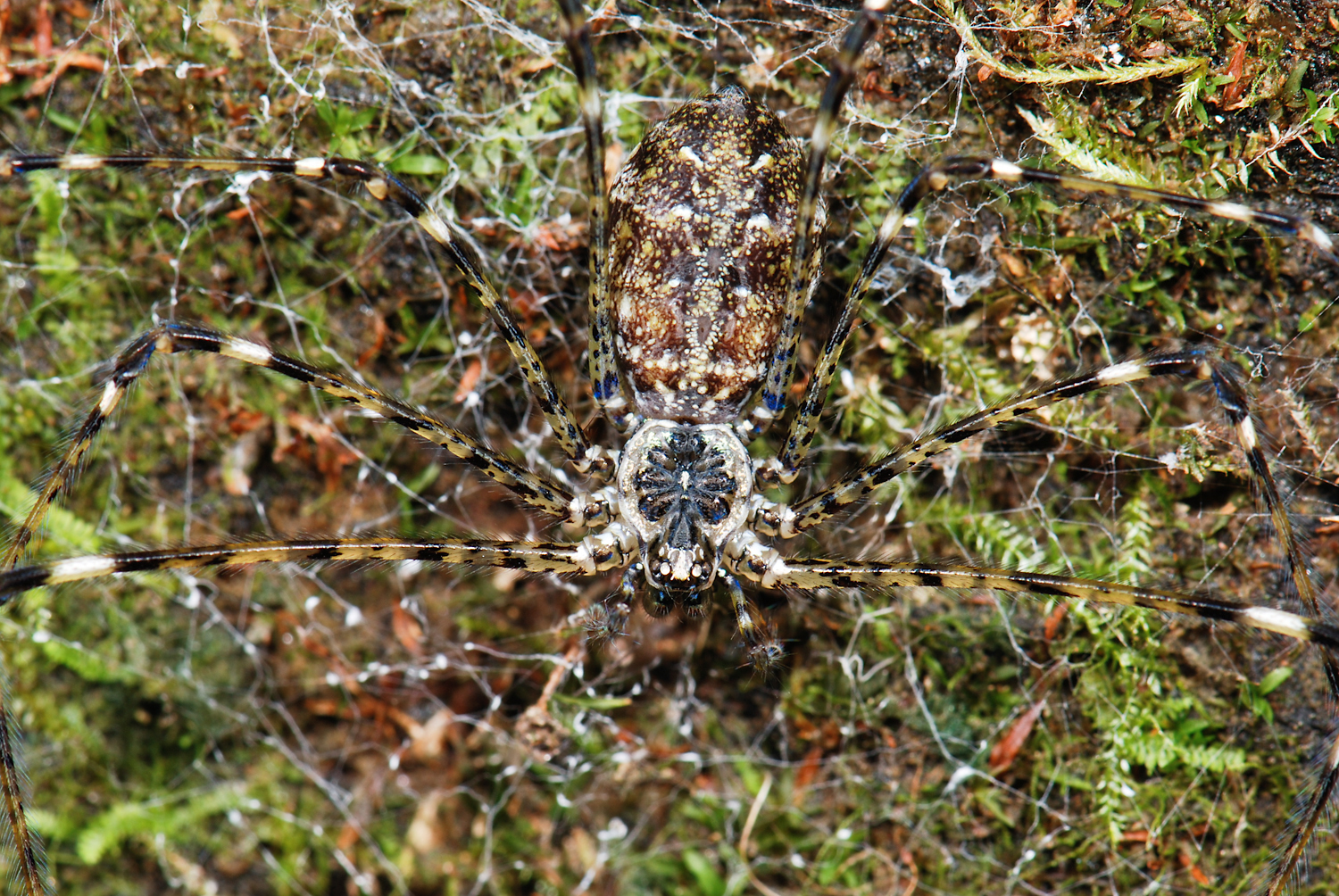

Scientific classification
- Kingdom: Animalia
- Phylum: Arthropoda
- Subphylum: Chelicerata
- Class: Arachnida
- Order: Araneae
- Infraorder: Araneomorphae
- Family: Hypochilidae
- Genus: Hypochilus
- Species: H. pococki

Binomial name
- Hypochilus pococki Platnick, 1987

= Hypochilus pococki =

Species of spider

Hypochilus pococki, or Pocock's lampshade-web spider, is a species of lampshade weaver in the family Hypochilidae. It is found in the United States.

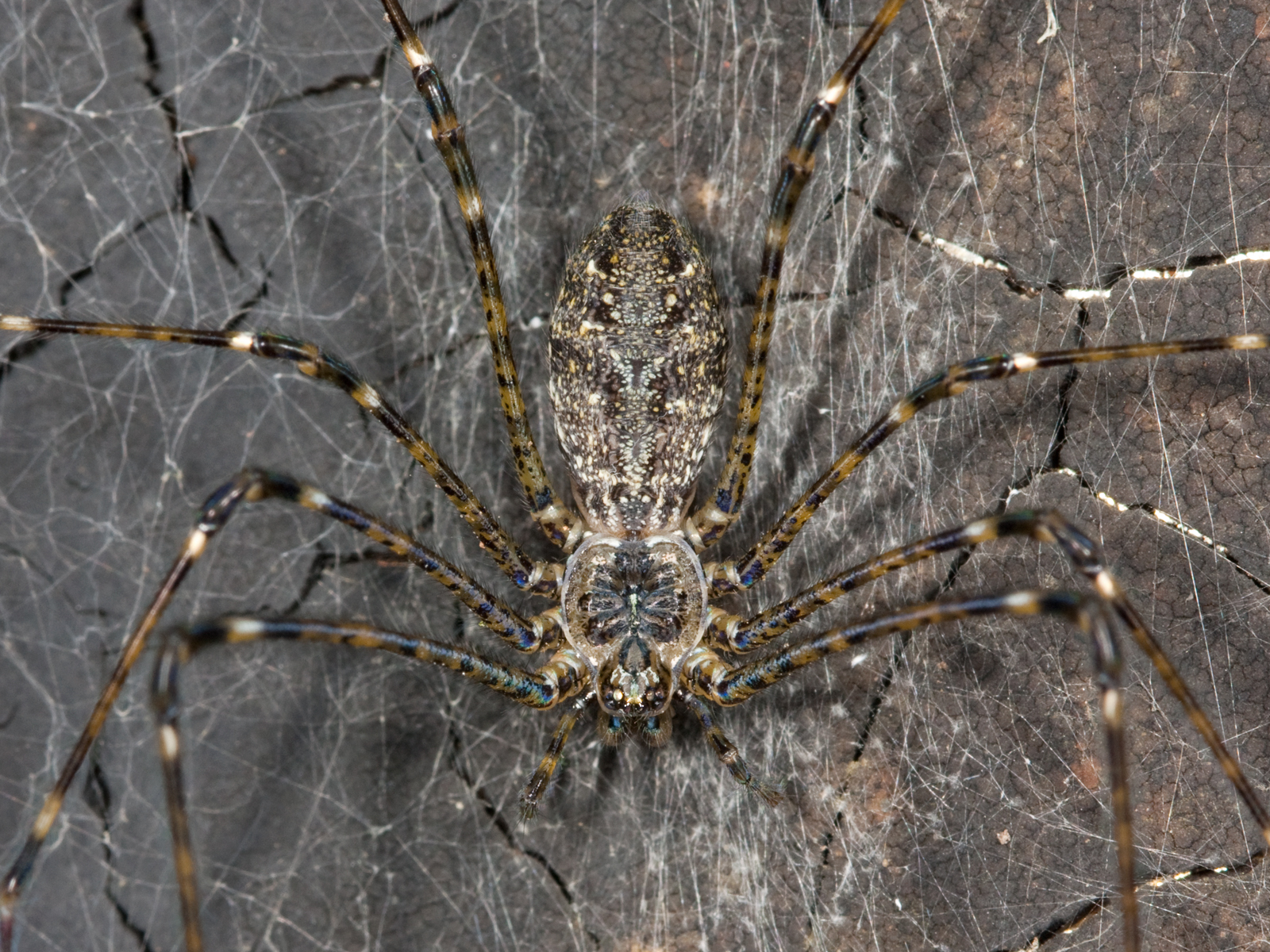
Pocock's lampshade-web spider, Hypochilus pococki

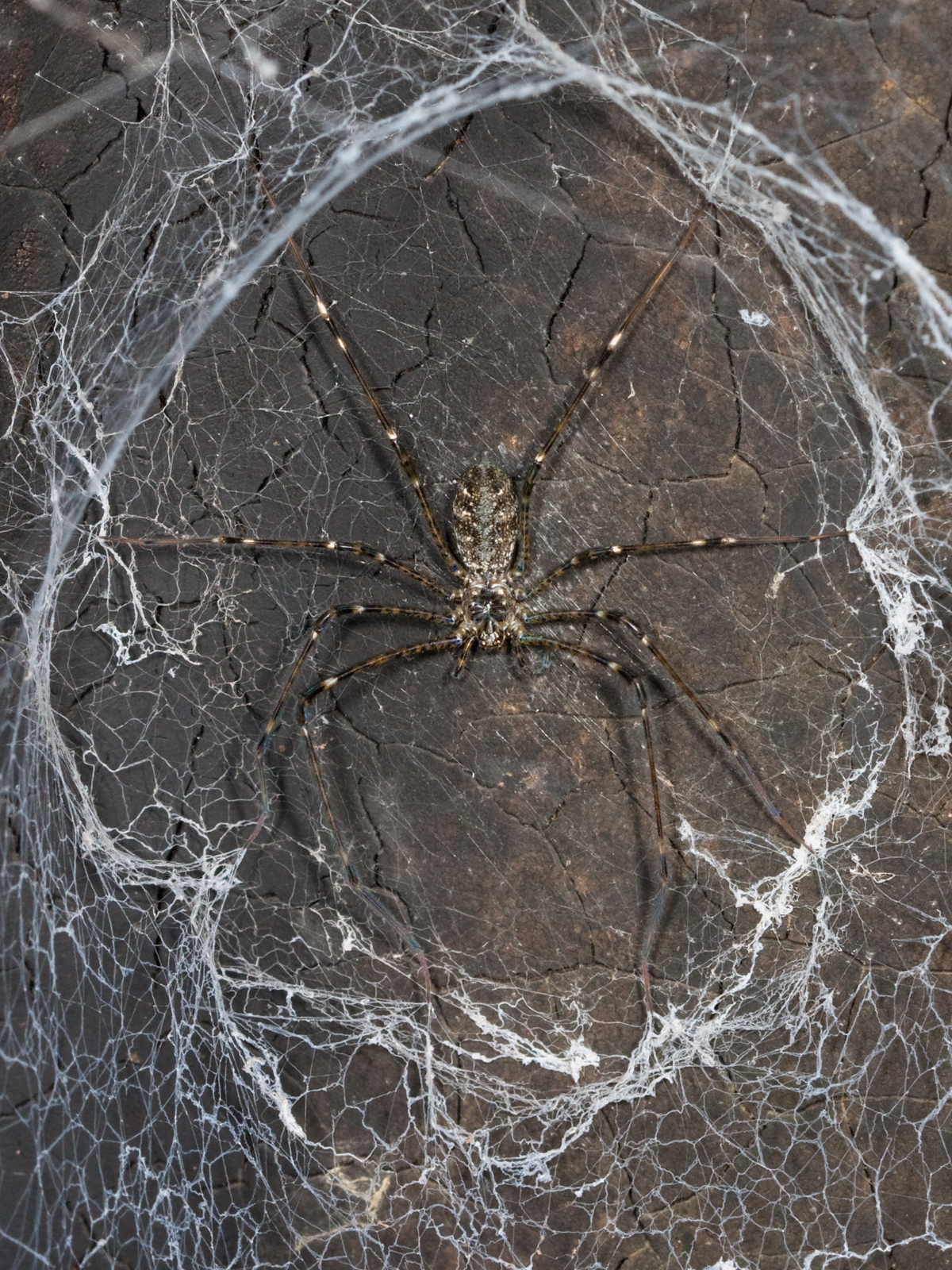
Pocock's lampshade-web spider, Hypochilus pococki
