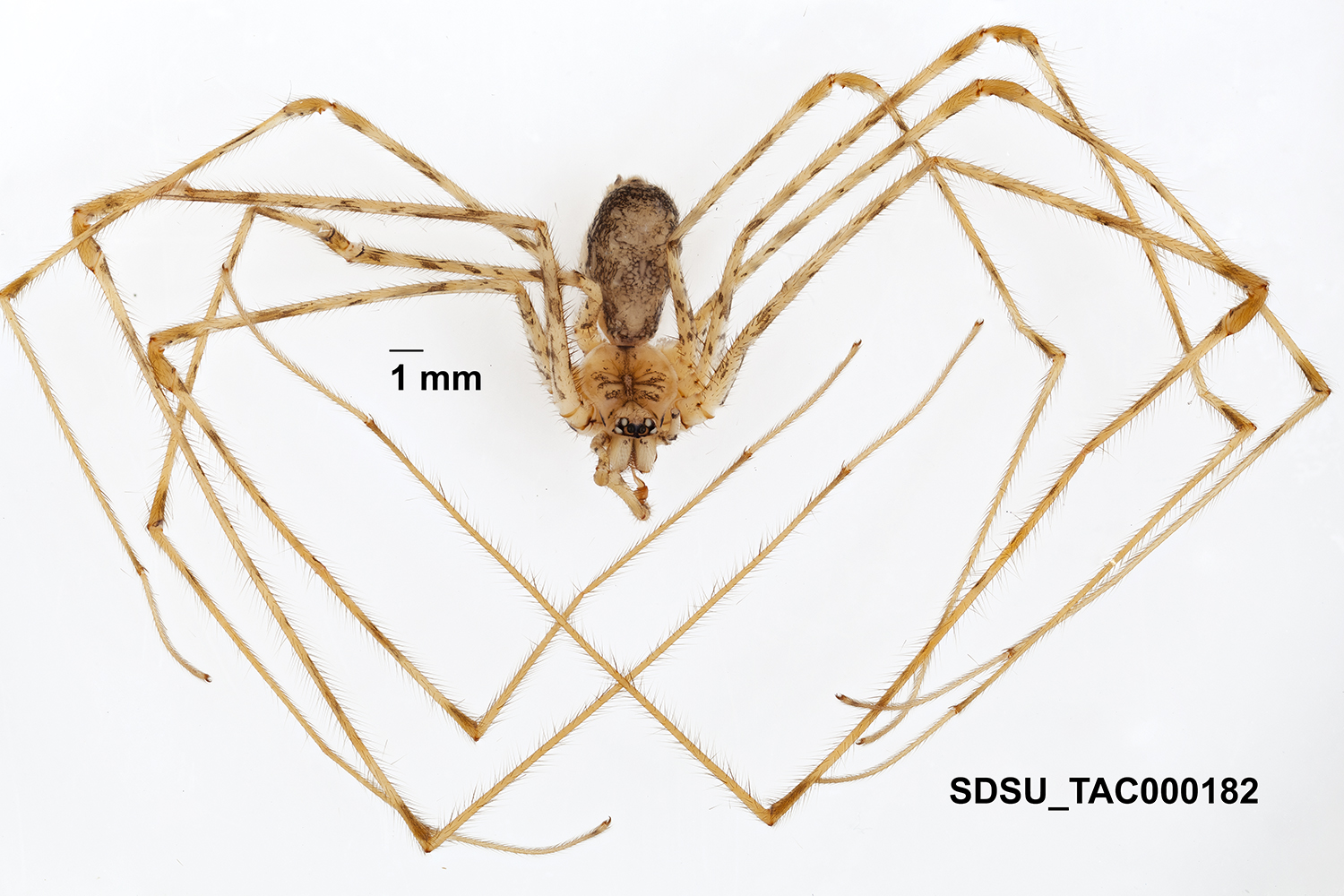

Scientific classification
- Kingdom: Animalia
- Phylum: Arthropoda
- Subphylum: Chelicerata
- Class: Arachnida
- Order: Araneae
- Infraorder: Araneomorphae
- Family: Hypochilidae
- Genus: Hypochilus
- Species: H. coylei

Binomial name
- Hypochilus coylei Platnick, 1987

= Hypochilus coylei =

Species of spider

Hypochilus coylei is a species of lampshade weaver in the family of spiders known as Hypochilidae. It is found in the United States. This species inhabits a 35 mile north-south corridor of mountain range in western North Carolina. This species has a two year life cycle and feeds on crickets and spiders.
