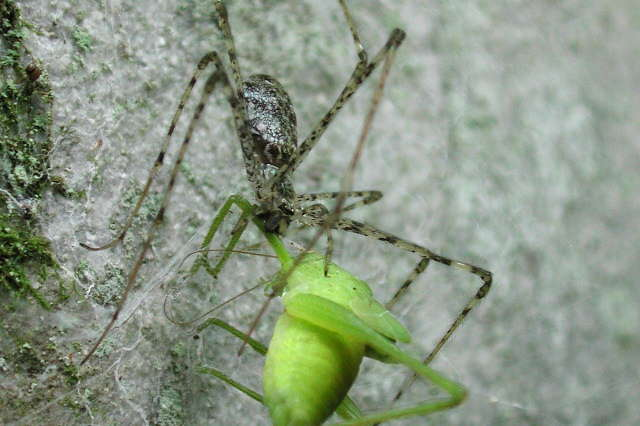
- H. thorelli feeding

Scientific classification
- Kingdom: Animalia
- Phylum: Arthropoda
- Subphylum: Chelicerata
- Class: Arachnida
- Order: Araneae
- Infraorder: Araneomorphae
- Family: Hypochilidae
- Genus: Hypochilus; Marx, 1888

Type species
- H. thorelli Marx, 1888

Species
- 10, see text

= Hypochilus =

Genus of spiders

Hypochilus is a genus of North American lampshade spiders that was first described by George Marx in 1888.

All described species are endemic to the United States.

== Species ==
As of October 2025, this genus includes eleven species:

- Hypochilus bernardino Catley, 1994 – United States
- Hypochilus bonneti Gertsch, 1964 – United States
- Hypochilus coylei Platnick, 1987 – United States
- Hypochilus gertschi Hoffman, 1963 – United States
- Hypochilus jemez Catley, 1994 – United States
- Hypochilus kastoni Platnick, 1987 – United States
- Hypochilus petrunkevitchi Gertsch, 1958 – United States
- Hypochilus pococki Platnick, 1987 – United States
- Hypochilus sheari Platnick, 1987 – United States
- Hypochilus thorelli Marx, 1888 – United States (type species)
- Hypochilus xomote Hedin & Ciaccio, 2022 – United States
