= Porterville, California =

City in California, United States

- City
- City of Porterville
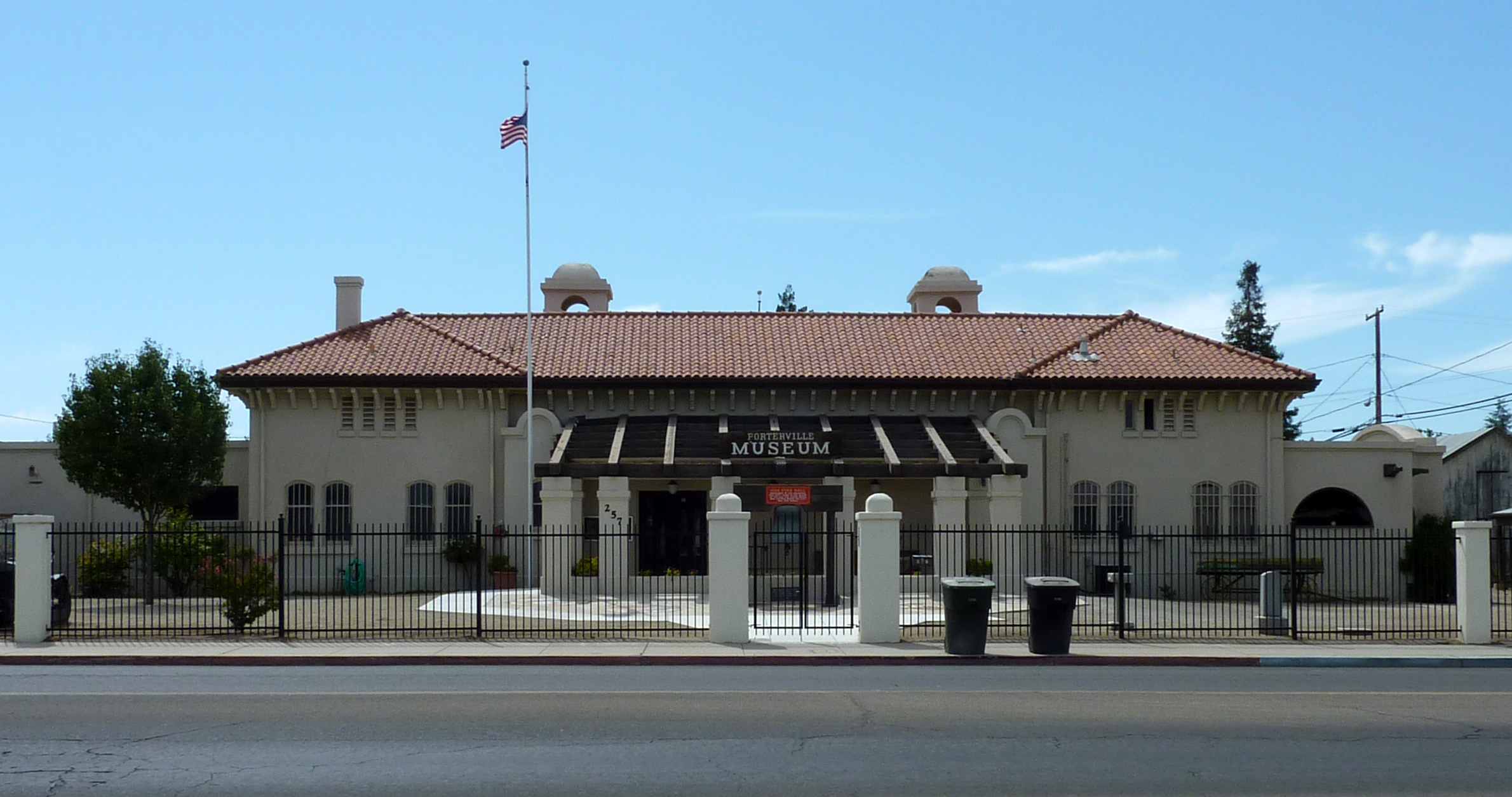
- The Porterville Historical Museum

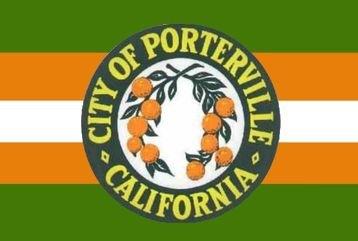
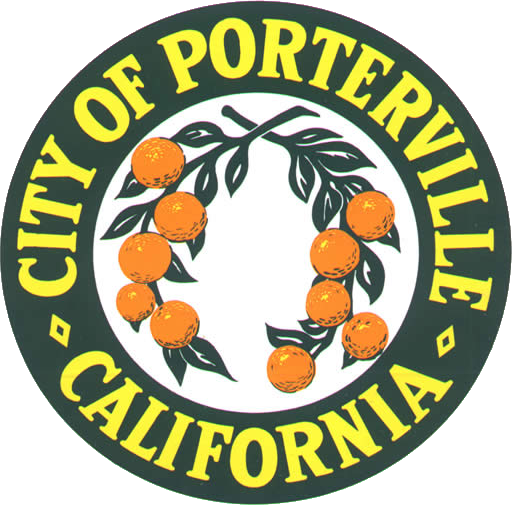
- Flag Seal
- Nicknames: P'ville,, BandTown USA, Gateway to the Sequoia National Monument Po'ville
- Interactive map of Porterville, California
- Location in California Location in the United States
- Coordinates: 36°4′7″N 119°1′39″W
- Country: United States
- State: California
- County: Tulare
- CSA: Visalia-Porterville-Hanford
- Metro: Visalia-Porterville
- Incorporated: May 7, 1902

Government
  - Type: Charter city, Council-Manager
  - City Manager: Rich Tree
  - Mayor: Greg Meister
  - Vice Mayor: Ed McKervey

Area
  - City: 18.70 sq mi (48.44 km^{2})
  - Land: 18.65 sq mi (48.30 km^{2})
  - Water: 0.054 sq mi (0.14 km^{2}) 0.29%
  - Metro: 4,839 sq mi (12,530 km^{2})
- Elevation: 460 ft (140 m)

Population (2020)
  - City: 62,623
  - Density: 3,358/sq mi (1,297/km^{2})
  - Metro: 459,446
  - Metro density: 94.95/sq mi (36.66/km^{2})
- Demonym: Portervillian
- Time zone: UTC−8 (Pacific)
  - Summer (DST): UTC−7 (PDT)
- ZIP codes: 93257–93258, 93265, 93267, 93270, 93260
- Area code: 559
- FIPS code: 06-58240
- GNIS feature IDs: 1652779, 2411470
- Website: www.ci.porterville.ca.us

Porterville is a city at the base of Southern Sierra Nevada mountains on the eastern side of San Joaquin Valley, in Tulare County, California, United States. It is part of the Visalia-Porterville metropolitan statistical area. Serving as the economic hub of the Southern Sierra, the Sequoia National Forest is nearby, offering outdoor recreational opportunities such as hiking, camping, and fishing. Since its incorporation in 1902, the city's population has grown as it annexed nearby unincorporated areas. The city population (not including East Porterville) was 62,623 at the 2020 census.

Porterville serves as a gateway to Sequoia National Forest, Giant Sequoia National Monument and Kings Canyon National Park.

== History ==
During California's Spanish period, the San Joaquin Valley was considered a remote region of little value. Emigrants skirted the eastern foothills in the vicinity of Porterville as early as 1826. Swamps stretched out into the Valley floor lush with tall rushes or "tulare" as the Indigenous people called them.

Gold discovered in 1848 brought a tremendous migration to California, and prairie schooners rolled through Porterville between 1849 and 1852. Starting in 1854, Peter Goodhue operated a stopping place on the Stockton - Los Angeles Road on the bank of the Tule River. Wagon trains of gold seekers passed through the village, but other travelers found the land rich and remained to establish farms. A store was set up in 1856 to sell goods to miners and the Native Americans, who lived in tribal lands along the rivers. From 1858 to 1861 it was the location of the Tule River Station of Butterfield Overland Mail.

Royal Porter Putnam came to the village in 1860 to raise cattle, horses and hogs. He bought out Goodhue the same year and turned the station into a popular stopping place and hotel called Porter Station. He bought 40 acres of land and built a two-story store and a hotel on the highest point of the swampy property, which is now the corner of Oak and Main. The town of Porterville was founded there in 1864. It took its name from the founder's given name because another Putnam family lived south of town.

In 1862 20.8 inches (530 mm) of rain fell in the area, causing a change of course of the Tule River. Putnam's acres drained and he had his property surveyed, staking out lot lines and establishing streets. Settlers were offered a free lot for every one purchased. The need of a burgeoning California population for food provided the impetus that led to the permanent development of the east side of the southern San Joaquin Valley. The long, dry, hot summer prompted irrigation of the lands.

In 1888 the Southern Pacific Railway brought in the branch line from Fresno. The Pioneer Hotel and Bank were built by businessmen from San Francisco. Porterville incorporated in 1902, as miners moved into the area to extract magnesite ore, and the Chamber of Commerce was formed in 1907. A City Manager-Council form of government was adopted in 1926 and a Charter was adopted. The city has grown from a community of 5,000 in 1920. Agriculture supplemented by the Central Valley Water Project has been the major source of economic growth in the area. The city is the center of a large farming area especially noted for citrus and livestock.

Industry has become a significant factor in the development of the community. The Walmart Distribution Center, National Vitamin, Beckman Instruments, Standard Register, Sierra Pacific Apparel, Royalty Carpeting and other small companies have facilities in Porterville. Several large public facilities are also located here. These include the Porterville Developmental Center, Sequoia National Forest Headquarters, the Army Corps of Engineers Lake Success Facility and the Porterville College campus of the Kern Community College District.

On March 10, 2023, the city was heavily impacted by catastrophic flash floods, which caused the National Weather Service to issue five separate flash flood emergencies for the city.

== The Tule River Indian War of 1856 ==
The Native Americans living in the foothills of the Sierra Nevada Mountains were relatively undisturbed by early Spanish colonization. During the late 1840s and into the 1850s, once gold was discovered in California, miners began encroaching on traditional lands. Although a treaty was signed with the local tribes in 1851, defining a proposed reservation and 200 head of cattle per year, the US Senate failed to ratify it, with every member either abstaining or voting no.

In the spring of 1856, a rumor that 500 cattle had been stolen by Native Americans began to circulate. Upon further investigation, it turned out that a single yearling calf had been taken as a bridal gift. Mobs of armed settlers were organized to counter the perceived menace, despite the peaceful intentions of the Native Americans. These mobs began raiding Native camps and killing their inhabitants.

One mob, under the leadership of Capt. Foster DeMasters, failed to dislodge a numerically superior Native encampment while wearing ineffective makeshift body armor consisting of cotton-padded jackets. Reinforcements were sent in from Keyesville and the resulting force, now under the leadership of Sheriff W.G. Poindexter, were similarly repulsed. After falling back, the mob then proceeded to wage a scorched-earth campaign by destroying Native American supply caches.

News of these engagements spread throughout California, exaggerating the degree of menace and misrepresenting its causes. Finally, in May 1856 army troops under the command of LaRhett Livingston assaulted the encampment and succeeded in driving off its defenders. The war's duration was approximately six weeks.

In retrospect, George Stewart wrote, "Thus ended the Tule River war of 1856; a war that might have been prevented had there been an honest desire on the part of the white settlers to do so, and one that brought little glory to those who participated therein. The responsibility cannot now be fixed where it properly belongs. Possibly the Indians were to blame. Certainly, the whites were not blameless, and it is too seldom, indeed, that they have been in the many struggles with the aboriginal inhabitants of this continent."

Historian Annie Mitchell later wrote in the Tulare County Historical Society bulletin (Los Tulares No. 68, March 1966): "Over the years it has been assumed that the Tule River War was a spontaneous, comic opera affair. It was not and if the Indians had been armed with guns instead of bows and a few pistols they would have run the white men out of the valley."

== Geography ==
Porterville is located at 36°4′7″N 119°1′39″W (36.068550, -119.027536).

According to the United States Census Bureau, the city has a total area of 18.7 square miles (48 km^{2}), of which 18.6 square miles (48 km^{2}) is land and 0.06 square miles (0.16 km^{2}) (0.29%) is water.

Porterville is located on the Tule River at the base of the western foothills of the Sierra Nevada and easternmost section of California's Central Valley. In the foothills above Porterville is the man-made Lake Success.

Porterville, lying along the foothills of the Sierras at an elevation of 455 feet (139 m), is located on State Highway 65, 165 miles (266 km) north of Los Angeles, and 171 miles (275 km) east of the Pacific Coast. The city has a strategic central location to major markets and a ready access to major transportation routes.

=== Geology ===
Porterville is subject to earthquakes due to its location within the Pacific Ring of Fire. The geologic instability involves numerous faults, which cause many earthquakes every year, but most are of low intensity and are not felt. The primary plate boundary is the San Andreas Fault, which was the source of the 1857 Fort Tejon earthquake. Another major event that affected the Porterville area was the Kern County sequence of shocks that occurred on the White Wolf Fault during July and August 1952. Most parts of the city are also vulnerable to floods. The San Joaquin Valley and metropolitan areas are also at risk from blind thrust earthquakes.

=== Climate ===
Porterville has a cool semi-arid climate (Köppen BSk) that is close to both a mediterranean climate (Csa) and a hot semi-arid climate (BSh). It is characterized by sweltering and arid summers, and pleasant winters with frosty mornings and occasional heavy rainfall.

Climate data for Porterville, California
Month	Jan	Feb	Mar	Apr	May	Jun	Jul	Aug	Sep	Oct	Nov	Dec	Year
Mean daily maximum °F (°C)	57.9 (14.4)	63.7 (17.6)	69.6 (20.9)	76.7 (24.8)	84.0 (28.9)	92.4 (33.6)	100.5 (38.1)	98.3 (36.8)	92.9 (33.8)	81.4 (27.4)	69.6 (20.9)	58 (14)	78.7 (25.9)
Mean daily minimum °F (°C)	35.6 (2.0)	39.1 (3.9)	42.1 (5.6)	46.3 (7.9)	51.8 (11.0)	57.6 (14.2)	63.7 (17.6)	61.8 (16.6)	56.2 (13.4)	49.5 (9.7)	40.7 (4.8)	36.8 (2.7)	48.4 (9.1)
Average rainfall inches (mm)	2.17 (55)	1.99 (51)	2.33 (59)	1.0 (25)	0.5 (13)	0.14 (3.6)	0.01 (0.25)	0.02 (0.51)	0.35 (8.9)	0.65 (17)	1.14 (29)	1.77 (45)	12.07 (307.26)
Average rainy days (≥ 0.01 in)	7.2	6.9	6.3	2.8	1.6	0.4	0.3	0.3	1.7	1.7	3.9	5.4	38.5
Source: NOAA

=== Environmental issues ===
Owing to geography, agriculture, and heavy reliance on automobiles, Porterville suffers from air pollution in the form of smog. The Porterville area and the rest of the San Joaquin Valley are susceptible to atmospheric inversion, which holds in the exhausts from road vehicles, airplanes, agriculture, manufacturing and other sources. Unlike other cities that rely on rain to clear smog, Porterville gets only 13.00 inches (330.20 mm) of rain each year: pollution accumulates over many consecutive days. Issues of air quality in Porterville and other major cities led to the passage of early national environmental legislation, including the Clean Air Act. More recently, the state of California has led the nation in working to limit pollution by mandating low-emission vehicles. Smog levels are only high during summers because it is dry and warm. In the winter, storms help to clear the smog and it is not as much of a problem. Smog should continue to drop in the coming years due to aggressive steps to reduce it, electric and hybrid cars and other pollution-reducing measures taken.

As a result, pollution levels have dropped in recent decades. The number of Stage 1 smog alerts has declined from over 100 per year in the 1970s to almost zero in the new millennium. Despite improvement, the 2006 annual report of the American Lung Association ranked the city as the 11th most polluted in the country, with short-term particle pollution and year-round particle pollution. In 2007 the annual report of the American Lung Association ranked the city as the 4th most polluted in the country with short-term particle pollution and year-round particle pollution. In 2008, the city was ranked the third most polluted and again fourth for highest year-round particulate pollution.

Porterville is also experiencing environmental issues due to California's extreme drought. Most of the nearby unincorporated area of East Porterville has run out of its supply of groundwater, an unfortunate consequence of the entire unincorporated area relying heavily on private wells. Porterville spent much of 2014 sending shipments of bottled water to East Porterville.

== Demographics ==
Historical population
Census	Pop.	Note	%±
1880	202		—
1890	606		200.0%
1910	2,696		—
1920	4,097		52.0%
1930	5,303		29.4%
1940	6,270		18.2%
1950	6,904		10.1%
1960	7,991		15.7%
1970	12,602		57.7%
1980	19,707		56.4%
1990	29,563		50.0%
2000	39,615		34.0%
2010	54,165		36.7%
2020	62,623		15.6%
2025 (est.)	63,088	▲	0.7%
U.S. Decennial Census

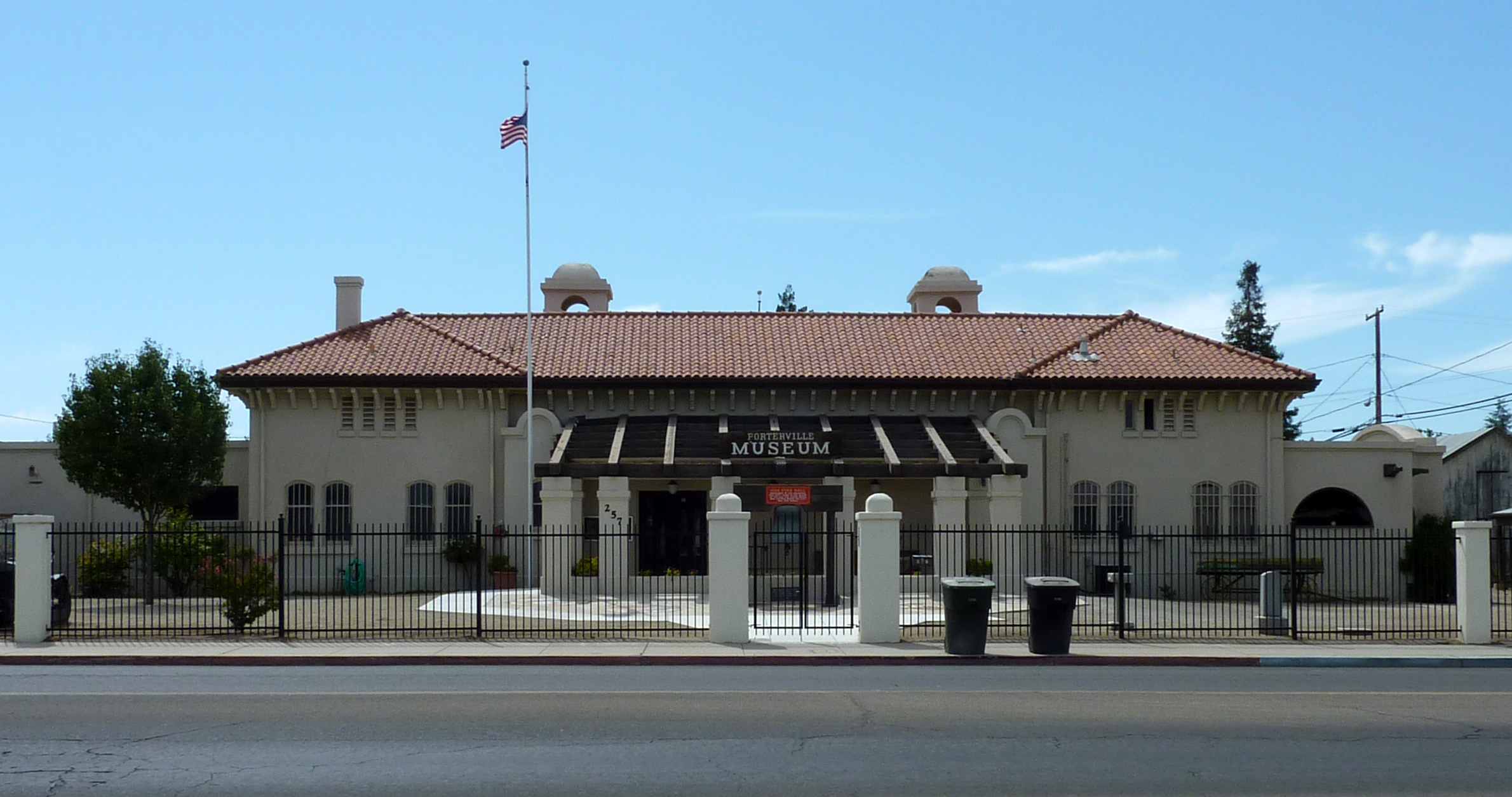
The Porterville Historical Museum occupies the old Southern Pacific Railroad depot, constructed in 1913.

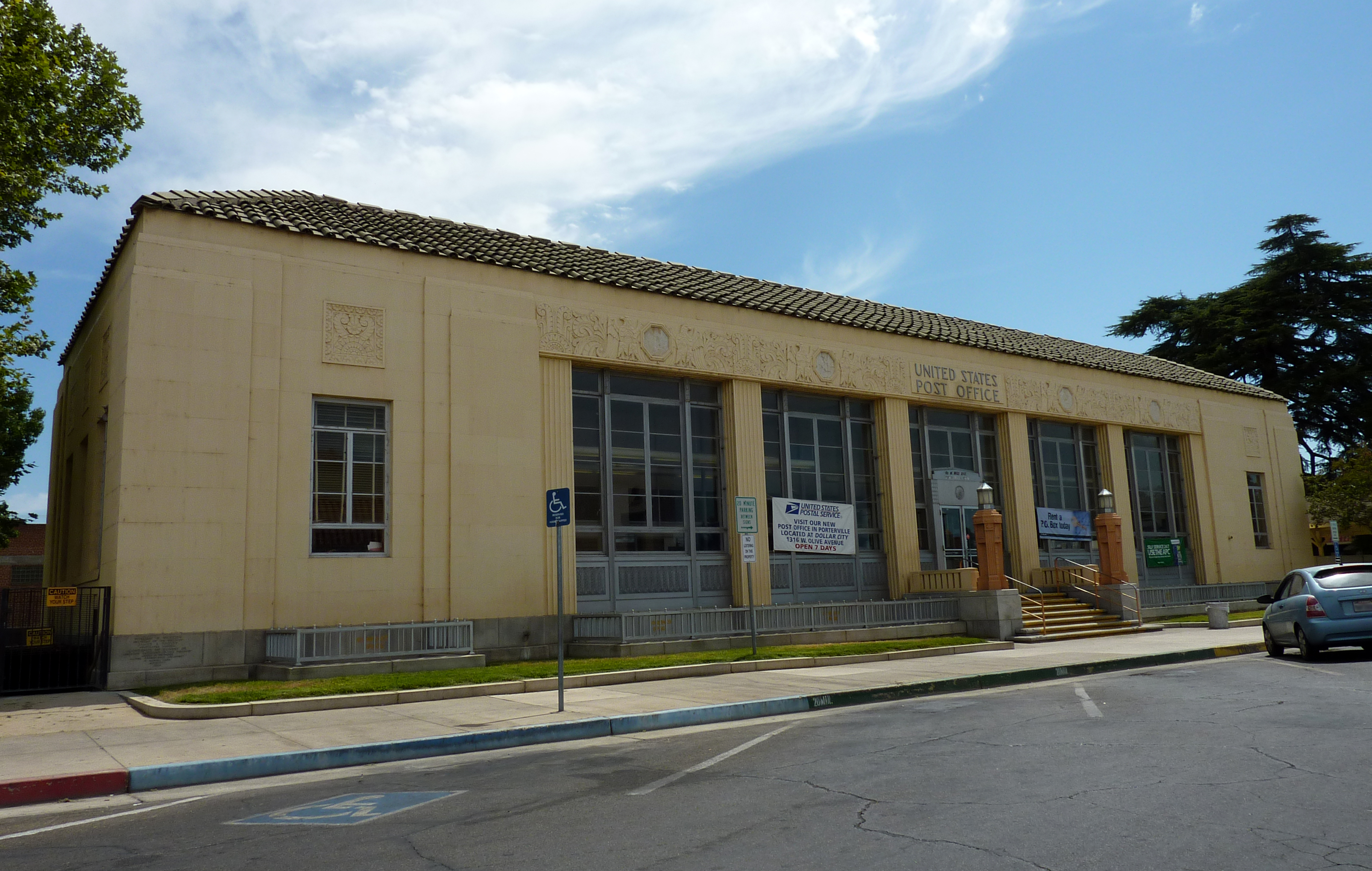
The Porterville Main post office is one of three Porterville structures on the National Register of Historic Places (NRHP).

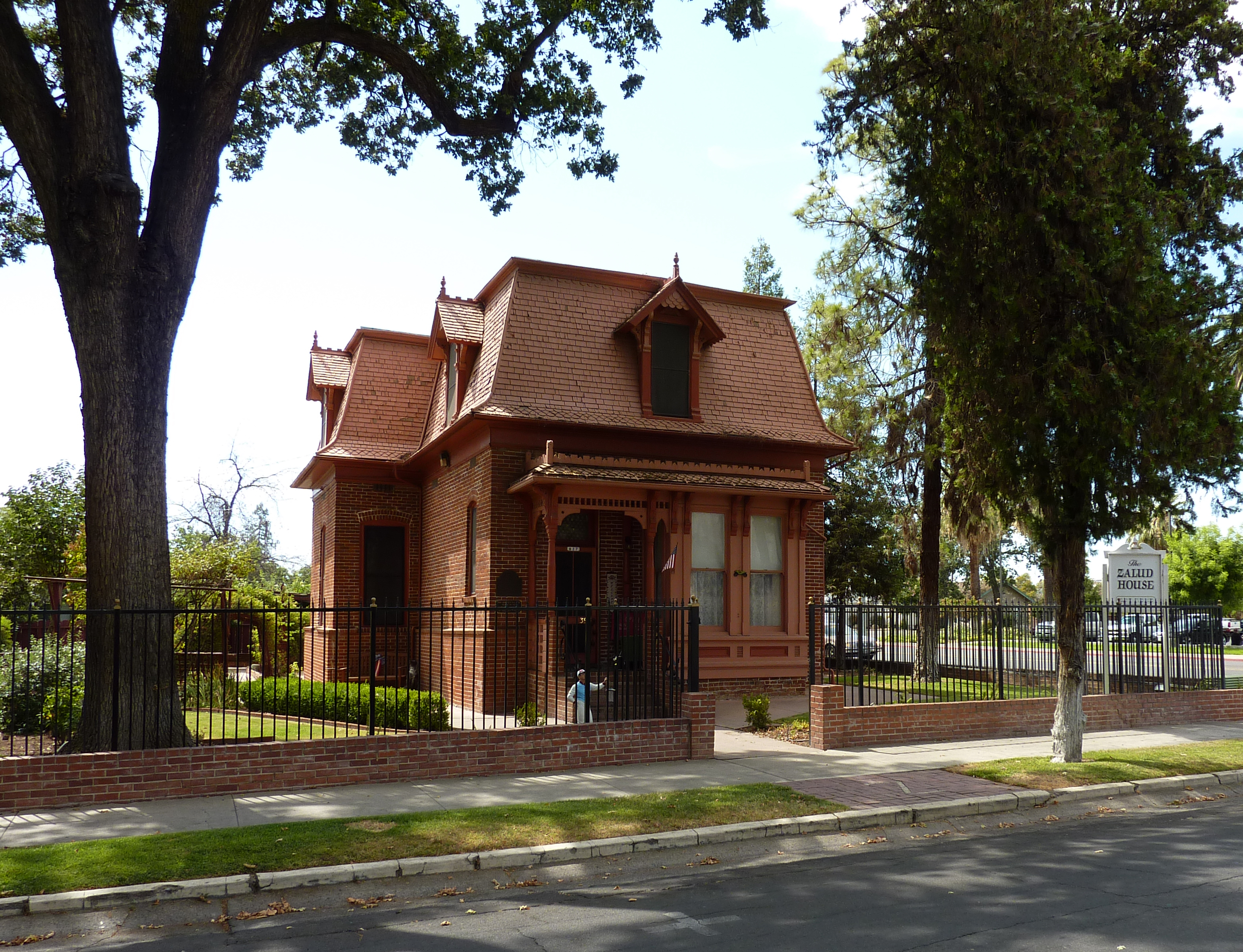
The NRHP-listed Zalud House is a former private home, now a museum.

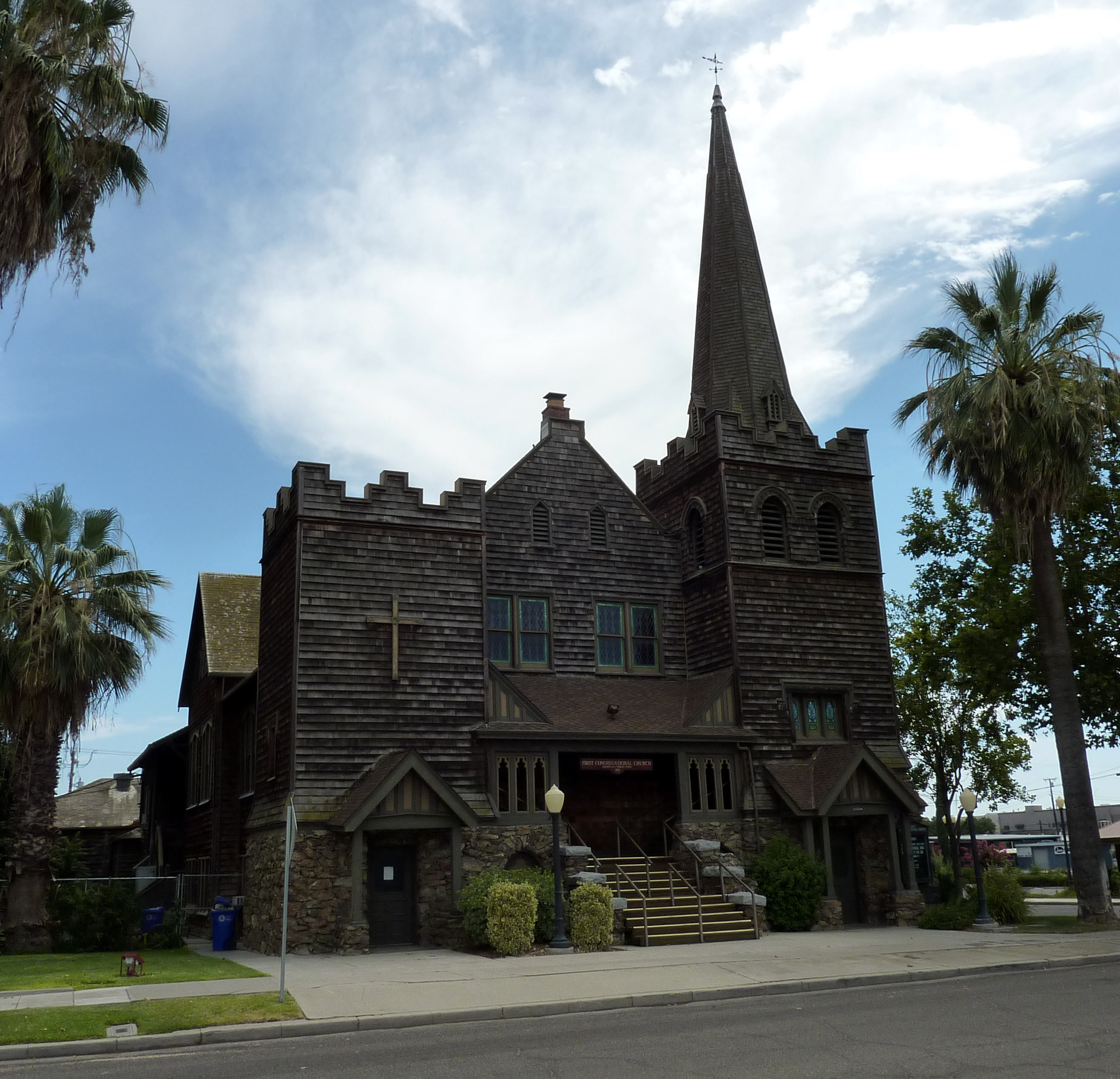
The First Congregational Church is also listed on the NRHP.

=== 2020 census ===
As of the 2020 census, Porterville had a population of 62,623. The population density was 3,358.3 inhabitants per square mile (1,296.6/km^{2}). 99.4% of residents lived in urban areas, while 0.6% lived in rural areas.

Racial composition as of the 2020 census
Race	Number	Percent
White	23,427	37.4%
Black or African American	566	0.9%
American Indian and Alaska Native	1,536	2.5%
Asian	2,771	4.4%
Native Hawaiian and Other Pacific Islander	142	0.2%
Some other race	23,023	36.8%
Two or more races	11,158	17.8%
Hispanic or Latino (of any race)	43,542	69.5%

The census reported that 98.6% of the population lived in households, 0.6% lived in non-institutionalized group quarters, and 0.9% were institutionalized.

There were 18,170 households, out of which 49.4% included children under the age of 18, 47.2% were married-couple households, 9.7% were cohabiting couple households, 26.7% had a female householder with no spouse or partner present, and 16.5% had a male householder with no spouse or partner present. About 16.7% of households were one person, and 7.8% had someone living alone who was 65 years of age or older. The average household size was 3.4. There were 14,229 families (78.3% of all households).

The age distribution was 32.0% under the age of 18, 10.6% aged 18 to 24, 26.0% aged 25 to 44, 20.1% aged 45 to 64, and 11.4% who were 65 years of age or older. The median age was 30.5 years. For every 100 females, there were 97.2 males, and for every 100 females age 18 and over there were 94.3 males.

There were 18,931 housing units at an average density of 1,015.2 units per square mile (392.0 units/km^{2}), of which 4.0% were vacant. Of occupied units, 55.3% were owner-occupied and 44.7% were occupied by renters. The homeowner vacancy rate was 0.9% and the rental vacancy rate was 3.4%.

=== 2023 ACS 5-year estimates ===
In 2023, the US Census Bureau estimated that 26.1% of the population were foreign-born. Of all people aged 5 or older, 45.5% spoke only English at home, 51.5% spoke Spanish, 0.3% spoke other Indo-European languages, 1.5% spoke Asian or Pacific Islander languages, and 1.1% spoke other languages. Of those aged 25 or older, 69.1% were high school graduates and 14.9% had a bachelor's degree.

The median household income in 2023 was $59,012, and the per capita income was $23,919. About 14.1% of families and 17.9% of the population were below the poverty line.

=== 2010 census ===
The 2010 United States census reported that Porterville had a population of 54,165. The population density was 3,076.3 inhabitants per square mile (1,187.8/km^{2}). The racial makeup of Porterville was 31,847 (58.8%) White, 673 (1.2%) African American, 1,007 (1.9%) Native American, 2,521 (4.7%) Asian, 64 (0.1%) Pacific Islander, 15,482 (28.6%) from other races, and 2,571 (4.7%) from two or more races. Hispanic or Latino of any race were 33,549 persons (61.9%).

The Census reported that 53,018 people (97.9% of the population) lived in households, 207 (0.4%) lived in non-institutionalized group quarters, and 940 (1.7%) were institutionalized.

There were 15,644 households, out of which 8,177 (52.3%) had children under the age of 18 living in them, 8,032 (51.3%) were opposite-sex married couples living together, 2,962 (18.9%) had a female householder with no husband present, 1,315 (8.4%) had a male householder with no wife present. There were 1,424 (9.1%) unmarried opposite-sex partnerships, and 115 (0.7%) same-sex married couples or partnerships. 2,679 households (17.1%) were made up of individuals, and 1,193 (7.6%) had someone living alone who was 65 years of age or older. The average household size was 3.39. There were 12,309 families (78.7% of all households); the average family size was 3.78.

The population was spread out, with 18,154 people (33.5%) under the age of 18, 5,879 people (10.9%) aged 18 to 24, 14,266 people (26.3%) aged 25 to 44, 10,773 people (19.9%) aged 45 to 64, and 5,093 people (9.4%) who were 65 years of age or older. The median age was 28.8 years. For every 100 females, there were 97.9 males. For every 100 females age 18 and over, there were 95.2 males.

There were 16,734 housing units at an average density of 946.5 units per square mile (365.4 units/km^{2}), of which 8,966 (57.3%) were owner-occupied, and 6,678 (42.7%) were occupied by renters. The homeowner vacancy rate was 2.9%; the rental vacancy rate was 6.3%. 30,016 people (55.4% of the population) lived in owner-occupied housing units and 23,002 people (42.5%) lived in rental housing units.

== Government ==
=== Municipal government ===
Porterville has operated as a charter city since 1926, giving it the power to make and enforce within its boundaries any law which does not conflict with the State or Federal government (as opposed to a general law city which operates exclusively under State law). The city's charter has been changed by the voters several times since then.

During the November 2008 Prop 8 election campaign, Porterville's City Council was the only City Council in all of California that passed a Resolution in favor of Prop 8. The Resolution urged voters to act on behalf of the council's personal, religious, and political interests. Local gay rights activists, such as Porterville LGBTQ, protested at subsequent City Council meetings for months afterwards, getting the attention of local media. Prop 8 amended California's constitution to deny marriage rights for same-sex couples. Porterville and Tulare County voters voted over 75% in favor of Prop 8, among the highest levels in the State of California, during the election. On August 4, 2010, Prop 8 was ruled unconstitutional under the 14th Amendment of the US Constitution. In June 2013, the mayor declared that month to be LGBT pride month, but that proclamation was subsequently rescinded by the city council. The City Council subsequently removed the Mayor responsible for introducing the proclamation, Virginia Gurrola. During a discussion on the establishment of anti-bullying youth safe zones, Gurrola's successor, Cam Hamilton, stated "I’m against bullying, but I’m getting damn tired of it being used as a mantra for everything when all most people have to do is grow a pair and stick up for them damn selves."

=== State and federal representation ===
In the California State Legislature, Porterville is in the 16th senatorial district, represented by Democrat Melissa Hurtado, and in the 33rd Assembly district, represented by Republican Alexandra Macedo.

In the United States House of Representatives, Porterville is in California's 22nd congressional district, represented by Republican David Valadao

== Infrastructure ==
The United States Postal Service operates the Main Post Office at 65 W. Mill Street, the Town & Country Post Office at 1316 W. Olive Avenue, the Doyle Colony Post Office at 1391 E. Springville Avenue, and the Poplar Post Office at 14653 Road 192. The Main Post Office is listed in the National Register of Historic Places.

== Economy ==
=== Largest employers ===
According to the city's 2024 Annual Comprehensive Financial Report, the top employers in the city are:

#	Employer	# of employees
1	Porterville Unified School District	1,687
2	Walmart Distribution Center	1,221
3	Porterville State Developmental Center	1,082
4	Burton School District	1,004
5	Eagle Mountain Casino	965
6	Sierra View District Hospital	800
7	Young's Commercial Transfer	536
8	Foster Farms	396
9	Family Healthcare Network	354
10	City of Porterville	330

== In popular culture ==
- The sheriff in Big Top Pee-wee (1988) received a report from Porterville about a windstorm approaching Pee-wee Herman's local town.
- It received the All-America City Award in 1994.
- In the science fiction novel The Santaroga Barrier (1968) Porterville is the nearest "normal town" to the fictional Santaroga situated in a valley 25 miles to the east of Porterville.
- In the science fiction novel Lucifer's Hammer (1977), this city is destroyed by the collapse of the dam at Lake Success.
- Porterville is the home of the Persian Lime.
- Porterville has three structures that are listed in the National Register of Historic Places (NRHP); The First Congregational Church, US Post Office- Porterville Main, The Zalud House Museum.
- John Fogerty wrote the song "Porterville" while he was in the army. It was later recorded by his band, the Golliwogs. While the song was not a hit for the Golliwogs, it propelled the changes that morphed that band into Creedence Clearwater Revival. "Porterville" was then included on CCR's debut album titled Creedence Clearwater Revival.
- On November 3, 2023, a fictional film directed by David M Parks about Porterville and was titled after the city was released on Amazon Prime and is about a former NYPD detective who moves to Porterville and becomes the new sheriff tasked with solving a string of murders causing a disturbance in the city. Taryn Manning and Caitlin O'Connor star in the film.

== Notable people ==
- Pete Arbogast Hall of Fame sports broadcaster for the USC Trojans
- Barbara Baxley, American actress and singer
- Dick Brooks, NASCAR driver
- Brant Brown, Fresno State and Major League Baseball outfielder (Chicago Cubs, Pittsburgh Pirates, and Florida Marlins)
- Tex Clevenger, Fresno State and Major League Baseball pitcher (Boston Red Sox, Washington Senators, Los Angeles Angels, and New York Yankees)
- Steve Cox, Major League Baseball first baseman (Tampa Bay Devil Rays)
- Allen Drury, novelist and 1960 Pulitzer Prize winner
- Jessica Govea, Labor organizer, she worked closely with Cesar Chavez and led the Toronto grape boycott at the age of 21. She later taught labor history at Rutgers University and Cornell University
- Vernon Grant, artist and creator of Kellogg's characters: Snap, Crackle, and Pop, graduated from Porterville High School, class of 1921
- Wayne Hardin, College Football Hall of Famer, former head football coach at Porterville College 1952 and 1953
- Sim Iness, Oklahoma-born Olympic gold medalist in discus throw
- Joan Marsh, American child actress
- Michel Moore, Chief of Police of the Los Angeles Police Department (LAPD)
- Monte Moore, Major League Baseball player and Oakland Athletics broadcaster
- Rance Mulliniks, Major League Baseball infielder (California Angels, Kansas City Royals, and Toronto Blue Jays)
- Rick Owens, fashion designer
- Bear Pascoe, football player for Fresno State and NFL's New York Giants
- Charlotte Pendragon, two-time winner of Magician of the Year award
- Helen M. Roberts, writer
- James Sanders, football player for Fresno State and NFL's Atlanta Falcons
- Bill Sharman, NBA Hall of Fame player and coach
- Joe Soto, professional mixed martial arts
- Buzz Stephen, MLB pitcher
- Kirsten Vangsness, actress (Criminal Minds)
- Tim Vanni, two-time Olympic wrestler

== Transportation ==
=== Highways and freeways ===
California State Route 65, known as the All-American City Highway or Porterville Freeway, is a major north–south freeway and expressway that heads north to Lindsay and south to Bakersfield. California State Route 190 is a major east–west highway in Porterville that heads west to California State Route 99 in Tipton and east bypassing East Porterville to Springville.

=== Major highways ===
- State Route 65
- State Route 190

=== County highways ===
- (CR J15) – Porterville
- (CR J26) – Porterville
- (CR J27) – Porterville
- (CR J28) – Porterville
- (CR J29) – Porterville
- (CR J37) – Porterville
- (CR J42) – East Porterville

=== Public transportation ===
With over 600,000 riderships annually, Porterville Transit operates environmentally-friendly and convenient public transportation to Porterville and the surrounding communities. Porterville COLT Paratransit service is designed for transit riders with disabilities that prevent them from using regular bus services. Porterville Transit and COLT services are provided within the city limits and to designated unincorporated urban areas of the county, including "county islands" within the city limits. In April 2020, the city began operating the transPORT service, mimicking on-demand private rideshare services like Uber and Lyft.

Tulare County Area Transit (TCaT) provides the public transit services between Porterville and smaller communities throughout the greater Porterville Area. Service includes Fixed Route and Demand Responsive services that are offered Monday through Saturday.

=== Air transportation ===
Porterville has one airport and offers 1 passenger Charter service, WestAir. The Porterville Municipal Airport.(IATA: PTV, ICAO: KPTV, FAA LID: PTV) the nearby commercial airports include:

- (IATA: FAT, ICAO: KFAT, FAA LID: FAT) Fresno Yosemite International Airport, owned by the City of Fresno; serves the San Joaquin Valley.
- (IATA: BFL, ICAO: KBFL, FAA LID: BFL) Meadows Field Airport, also known as Kern County Airport #1, serves the South Valley and the Greater Metropolitan Bakersfield.

=== Porterville Gateway Airport Project ===
The City of Porterville has been awarded a federal grant for $4.44 million towards the rehabilitation of the Porterville Municipal Airport Taxiway. The grant has been awarded by the United States Department of Transportation through the Federal Aviation Administration (FAA) and the Airport Improvement Program (AIP), which provides grants to public agencies for planning and development. The grant will pay ninety percent (90%) of the estimated total construction costs for the rehabilitation of the parallel taxiway and the reconfiguration of three connecting taxiways to meet current FAA geometry standards. The taxiway rehabilitation project is part of planned multi-phase enhancements that will construct significant upgrades to the Airport over the next several years, including a shift of the runway to increase the runway length from currently approximately 6,000 feet to 7,800 feet, making it possible to support the operation of large jet aircraft.

=== Rail ===
Porterville was a station stop on the Southern Pacific's Exeter Branch. A branch line also ran east to Springville. This line was later sold to the San Joaquin Valley Railroad. On Feb 19, 2008, SJVR filed to abandon the portion of the line through Porterville; by 2010, the rails and ties had been removed. However, the city purchased the right-of-way in order to preserve it for future use, namely the Cross Valley Corridor.

The Atchison, Topeka and Santa Fe Railway also had a rail line through Porterville- the Porterville-Orosi District. This line was removed in the late 1990s. The former ATSF Depot still stands and is in use as a senior center.

== Media ==
=== Newspaper ===
The Porterville Recorder is the daily newspaper serving Greater Porterville.

=== Radio Station ===
Radio stations KIOO (99.7 FM), K289AZ (105.7 FM, rebroadcasts KAWF), KMQA (100.5 FM) and KTIP (1450 AM).

=== Television ===
TV station KTFF-DT and KVVG-LP are all licensed to Porterville.

== Education ==
Most of Porterville is served by the Porterville Unified School District (PUSD) for all grade levels, K-12. Portions of the western section of the city are zoned to the Burton Elementary School District, and a portion of the city in the east is in the Alta Vista Elementary School District. PUSD covers the Alta Vista and Burton parts only for secondary grades.

=== Schools in the Porterville Unified School District ===
==== Elementary schools ====
- SantaFe Elementary School
- Los Robles Elementary School
- Vandalia Elementary School
- Roche Avenue Elementary School
- Belleview Elementary School
- John J. Doyle Elementary School
- Monte Vista Elementary School
- Olive Street Elementary School
- Westfield Elementary School
- West Putnam Elementary School

==== Middle schools ====
- Pioneer Middle School
- Sequoia Middle School
- Bartlett Middle School
- Horizon Community Day School

=== High schools ===
- Citrus High School
- Porterville High School
- Harmony Magnet Academy
- Monache High School
- Strathmore High School
- Porterville Military Academy
- Granite Hills High School

==== Alternative high schools ====
- Prospect Education Center
- Vine Street Community School

==== Adult schools ====
- Porterville Adult School

=== Elementary schools ===
- Oak Grove Elementary School
- William R. Buckley Elementary School
- Jim Maples Academy
- Summit Charter Academy- Mathew Campus
- Summit Charter Academy- Lombardi Campus
- Burton Elementary School

==== Middle schools ====
- Burton Middle School
- Summit Charter Intermediate Academy

==== High schools ====
- Summit Charter Collegiate Academy

==== Alternative schools ====
- Burton Charter Home School

=== Higher education ===
There is one community college in Porterville, Porterville College (PC), and National University maintains a learning center within Porterville College.

In May 2017 San Joaquin Valley College opened a branch on Main Street; SJVC will be located in the former Family Health Care Network corporate offices and will use 5,000 square feet (460 m^{2}) of the building per city policies until the city decides if it will allow the branch to operate as a full campus. It is expected that in the near future SJVC Porterville branch will also use the former bank building located next door for further expansion.

== Courts ==
- Tulare County - District Attorney- Office - 16 East Olive Avenue
- Social Security Administration - Office - 890 West Morton Avenue

=== South County Justice Center ===
The new nine-courtroom, 96,000-square-foot courthouse replaced the previous overcrowded Porterville Courthouse. Completed in fall 2013, the $93 million courthouse — which was built by Sundt Construction Inc. and designed by CO Architects — provides the necessary space for expansion and enhanced security, enabling the court to greatly improve access and services.

The facility features chambers, courtroom holdings, jury deliberations rooms, support services, clerks offices and work areas, public walk-up windows and queuing, holding and below-grade sally port. The approximately eight-acre site includes parking and circulation and a featured courtyard scheme.

The courthouse is designed to achieve a LEED Silver certification by the U.S. Green Building Council. The building includes high-performance glass, window-shading devices to prevent direct sunlight, and better-insulated walls and roof, and a rain screen system.

It has more energy-efficient mechanical units, which incorporate the partial use of chilled beam passive cooling and radiant heat. The lighting will be high-efficient fluorescent and LED fixtures.

Other sustainable features include: low-use water fixtures and landscape, green roofs, recycling construction materials, the use of regional material and renewable materials as well as certified wood and natural light.

The center was funded under the Trial Court Facilities Act of 2002, made the state of California responsible for court facilities and court construction statewide, and designated a portion of court-user fees and penalties collected to fund the project.

== Sister cities ==
Porterville's sister cities are:

- Strathmore
- Lindsay
