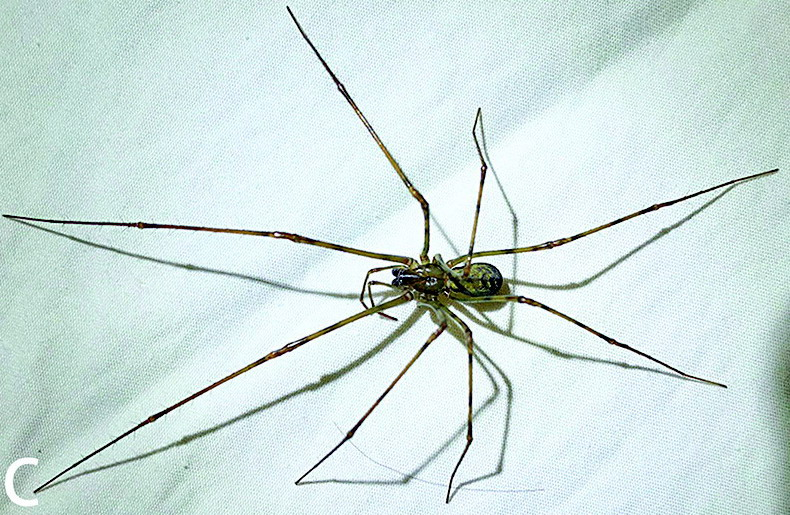

Scientific classification
- Kingdom: Animalia
- Phylum: Arthropoda
- Subphylum: Chelicerata
- Class: Arachnida
- Order: Araneae
- Infraorder: Araneomorphae
- Family: Hypochilidae
- Genus: Ectatosticta; Simon, 1892

Type species
- E. davidi (Simon, 1889)

= Ectatosticta =

Genus of spiders

Ectatosticta is a genus of lampshade spiders that was first described by Eugène Simon in 1892.

All of its described species are endemic to China.

== Species ==
As of October 2025, this genus includes 22 species:

- Ectatosticta baima Lin & S. Q. Li, 2021 – China
- Ectatosticta baixiang Lin & S. Q. Li, 2021 – China
- Ectatosticta bajie Lin & Li, 2021 – China
- Ectatosticta dapeng Lin & Li, 2021 – China
- Ectatosticta davidi (Simon, 1889) – China (type species)
- Ectatosticta deltshevi Platnick & Jäger, 2009 – China
- Ectatosticta furax Wang, Zhao, Irfan & Zhang, 2021 – China
- Ectatosticta helii Lin & S. Q. Li, 2021 – China
- Ectatosticta menyuanensis Wang, Zhao, Irfan & Zhang, 2021 – China
- Ectatosticta nyingchiensis Wang, Zhao, Irfan & Zhang, 2021 – China
- Ectatosticta pingwuensis Wang, Zhao, Irfan & Zhang, 2021 – China
- Ectatosticta puxian Lin & S. Q. Li, 2021 – China
- Ectatosticta qingshi Lin & S. Q. Li, 2021 – China
- Ectatosticta rulai Lin & Li, 2021 – China
- Ectatosticta shaseng Lin & S. Q. Li, 2021 – China
- Ectatosticta shennongjiaensis Wang, Zhao, Irfan & Zhang, 2021 – China
- Ectatosticta songpanensis Wang, Zhao, Irfan & Zhang, 2021 – China
- Ectatosticta wenshu Lin & S. Q. Li, 2021 – China
- Ectatosticta wukong Lin & Li, 2020 – China
- Ectatosticta xuanzang Lin & Li, 2020 – China
- Ectatosticta yukuni Lin & Li, 2021 – China
- Ectatosticta zhouzhiensis Wang, Zhao, Irfan & Zhang, 2021 – China
