= Tule River =

Tule River Rio San Pedro
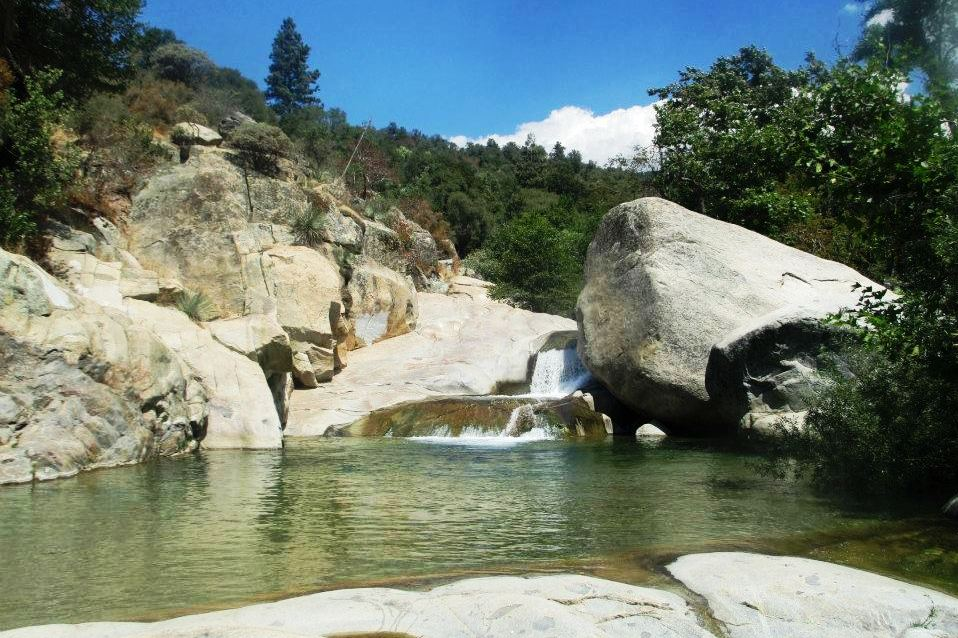
- Waterfall on the Tule River

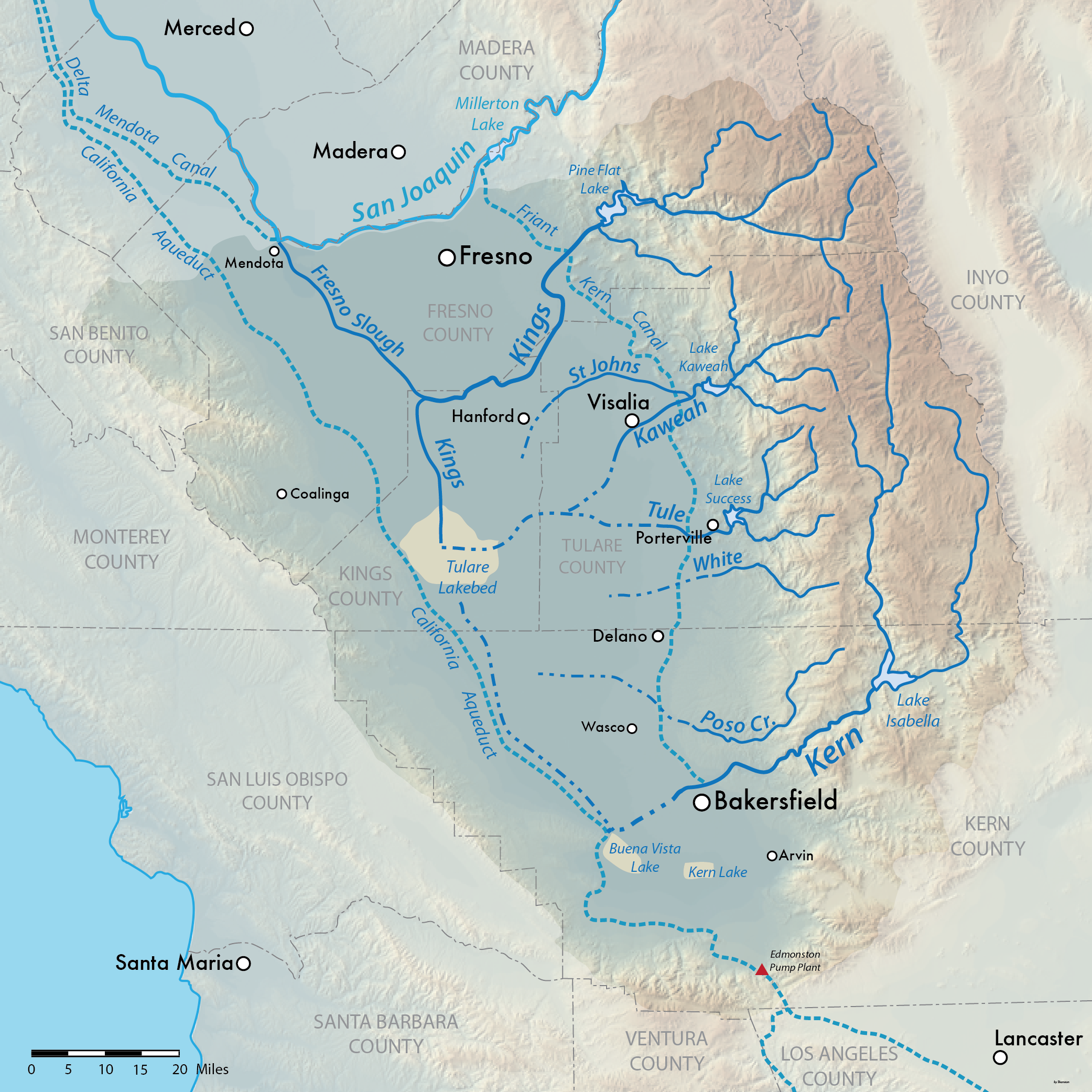
- Map of streams and rivers in the Tulare Lake basin including the Tule River

Location
- Country: United States
- State: California
- Cities: Springville, Porterville, Tipton, Corcoran

Physical characteristics
- Source: Confluence of North and Middle Forks
  - location: Springville, Tulare County
  - coordinates: 36°08′17″N 118°48′23″W
  - elevation: 1,037 ft (316 m)
- Mouth: Tulare Lakebed
  - location: Kings County
  - coordinates: 36°02′59″N 119°49′27″W
  - elevation: 184 ft (56 m)
- Length: 71.4 mi (114.9 km)
- Basin size: 400 sq mi (1,000 km^{2})
- Discharge
  - location: below Success Dam
  - average: 197 cu ft/s (5.6 m^{3}/s)
  - minimum: 0 cu ft/s (0 m^{3}/s)
  - maximum: 32,000 cu ft/s (910 m^{3}/s)

Basin features
- River system: Tulare Lake basin
- Tributaries
  - left: Middle Fork Tule River, South Fork Tule River
  - right: North Fork Tule River

The Tule River, also called Rio de San Pedro or Rio San Pedro, is a 71.4-mile (114.9 km) river in Tulare County in the U.S. state of California. The river originates in the Sierra Nevada east of Porterville and consists of three forks, North, Middle and South. The North Fork and Middle Fork meet above Springville. The South Fork meets the others at Lake Success. Downstream of Success Dam, the river flows west through Porterville. The river used to empty into Tulare Lake, but its waters have been diverted for irrigation. The river reaches Tulare Lake during floods. Tulare Lake is the terminal sink of an endorheic basin that historically also received the Kaweah and Kern Rivers as well as southern distributaries of the Kings.

== History ==
The Yaudanchi, also called Nutaa, of the Yokuts peoples held Tule River in the foothills, especially the North and Middle Forks.

The Tule River is named for a common bulrush or cattail known as "tule". The present Tule River was named Rio de San Pedro by Moraga's expedition in 1806. On Derby's map of 1850 it appears as Tule River or Rio San Pedro.

== Course ==
=== North Fork ===
The North Fork, 18.9 miles (30.4 km) long, begins high on a ridge facing south towards the Middle Fork Tule River drainage. It plunges southwest down a canyon in the Giant Sequoia National Monument, then is joined at the same time by Kramer Creek and Backbone Creek as it enters a broader and less inclined valley. At Milo, the river turns southeast and parallels the Springville-Milo Road. Sycamore and Whitney Creeks join the river from the east and west, respectively, before it meets the Middle Fork at Springville.

=== Middle Fork ===
The 6.9-mile-long (11.1 km) Middle Fork is formed by the confluence of the short South Fork Middle Fork Tule River and the North Fork Middle Fork Tule River. The South Fork flows northwest and west, paralleling California State Route 190, from its headwaters near Camp Nelson. The larger North Fork flows south from inside Sequoia National Park, plunges over North Fork of the Middle Fork of the Tule River Falls, and flows southwest to join the South Fork. After the confluence of the North and South forks, the Middle Fork Tule River flows more or less south and southwest, parallel to State Route 190, to join the North Fork and form the Tule River.

=== South Fork ===
The 27.8-mile-long (44.7 km) South Fork Tule River joins the mainstem Tule River at Lake Success. The South Fork Tule River begins at 9,100 feet (2,800 m) on the western side of Slate Mountain's peak. The "Painted Rock" is a cavern under a large boulder with a remarkable set of pictographs along the South Fork Tule River, at 1,608 feet (490 m) on the Tule Indian Reservation, just above the Pigeon Creek confluence. Pigeon Creek, Blue Creek, Rocky Creek, and Bond Creek all join the South Fork Tule River mainstem near Soda Springs, then the river winds west-southwest through a narrow canyon. It then bends northwest, receiving Long Branch Creek from the left and Crew Creek from the right. It then forms an arm of Lake Success, which is crossed by State Route 190.

=== Mainstem ===
From the confluence, the Tule River flows about 10 miles (16 km) south and west, still following State Route 190, to Lake Success. Before emptying into the lake, it is joined by Campbell Creek from the north, and Graham Creek from the east. The South Fork of the Tule River joins the river in Lake Success. The river then exits the Success Dam and flows west into Porterville, and winds west to the former bed of Tulare Lake. It passes the cities of Tipton and Corcoran, and splits into many channels, eventually disappearing into multiple agricultural irrigation and drainage channels. The river terminates about 9 miles (14 km) east-northeast of Kettleman City in Kings County at a junction with a canal carrying water from the Kings River.

== Ecology ==
North American beaver (Castor canadensis) were returned to the river for the first time in over 100 years by the California Department of Fish and Wildlife (CDFW) and the Tule River tribe in June, 2024. Kenneth McDarment, a Tule River Tribe member and past tribal councilman, led the effort with CDFW to return beaver for their potential to improve habitat conditions for endangered amphibians and birds that live in the area, including foothill and southern mountain yellow-legged frogs, western pond turtles, least Bell's vireo and southwestern willow flycatchers. These initial releases were to two tributaries of the South Fork Tule River, Eagle Creek and Miner Creek.
