= Lake Success (California) =

Lake in California

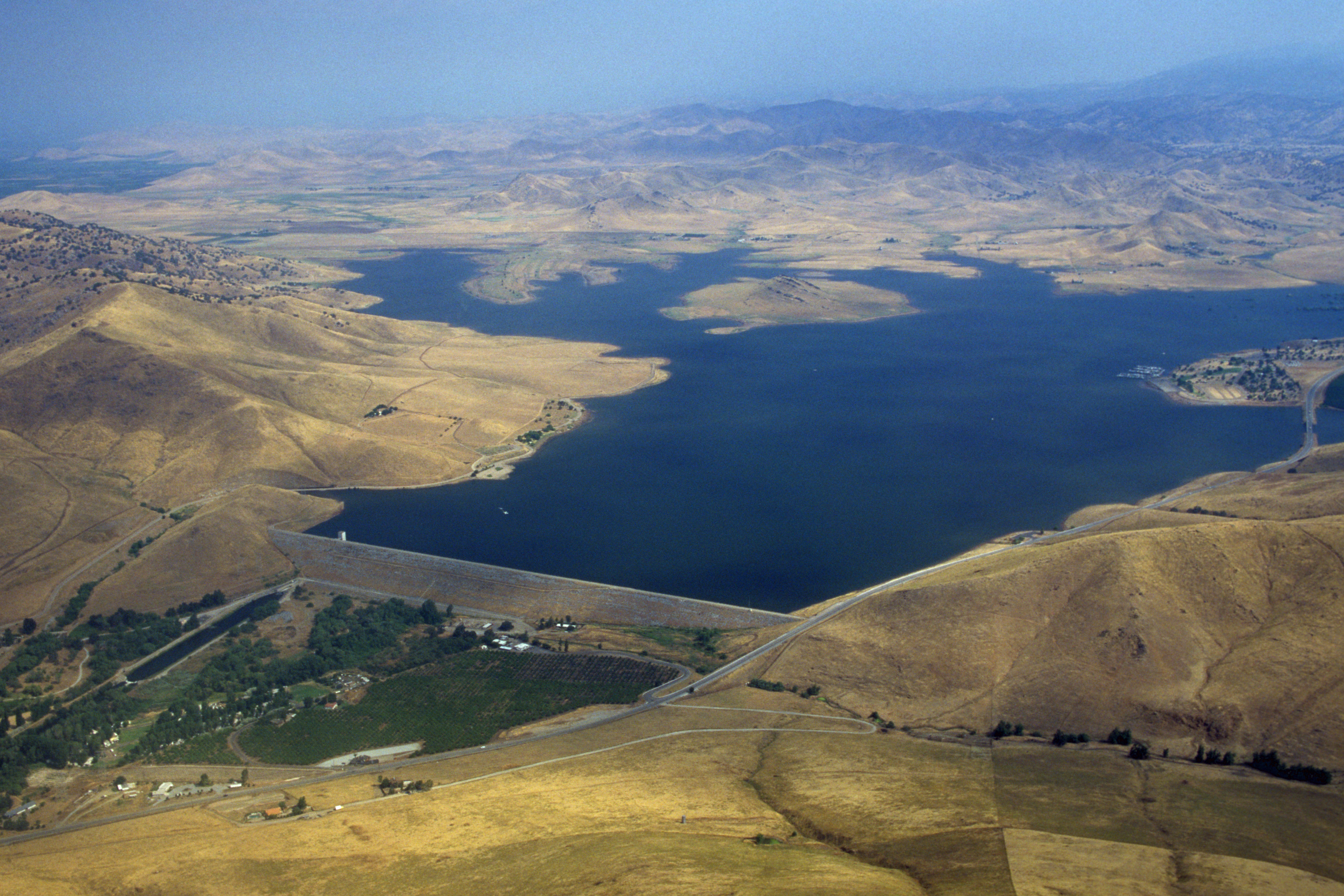
- Looking north in an aerial view of Success Dam, located near Porterville

- Location within California Location within the United States
- Location: Tulare County, California, United States
- Coordinates: 36.06°N 118.92°W
- Type: Reservoir
- Primary inflows: Tule River
- Primary outflows: Tule River
- Basin countries: United States
- Max. length: 4 mi (6.4 km)
- Max. width: 2 mi (3.2 km)
- Surface area: 2,450 acres (990 ha)
- Average depth: 645 ft (197 m)
- Max. depth: 653 ft (199 m)
- Water volume: 82,000 acre⋅ft (101,000,000 m^{3})
- Shore length^{1}: 30 mi (48 km)
- Surface elevation: 640 ft (200 m)
- Islands: Boat Island
- ^{1} Shore length is not a well-defined measure.

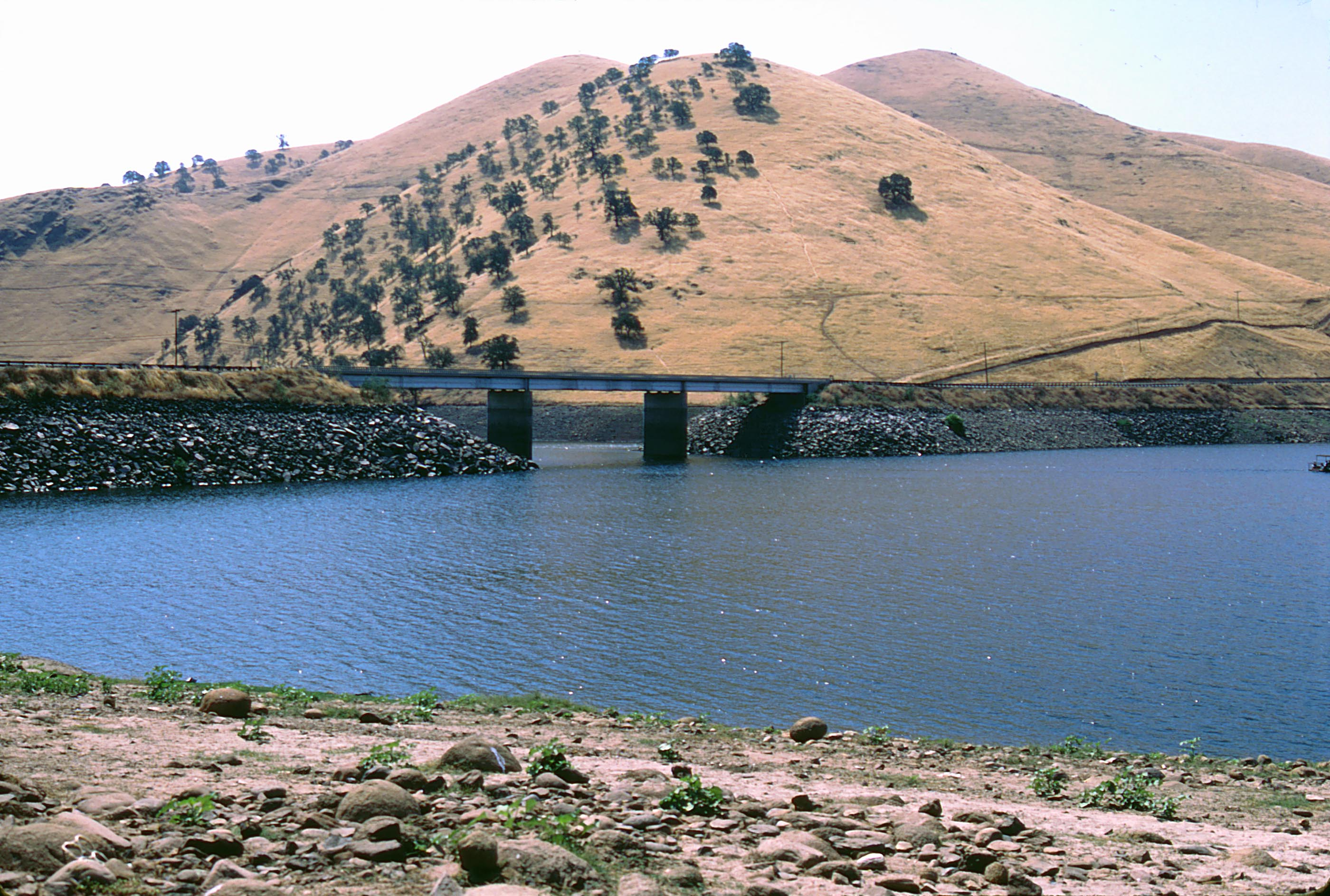
The California State Route 190 bridge crossing over Lake Success.

Success Lake is a reservoir near Porterville, California, on the Tule River near the southern end of the Central Valley. It was formed in 1961, when construction of Success Dam was completed.

== History ==
The creation of Success Lake required significant changes to the local area. A cemetery was relocated, and the recreation areas of Bartlett Park and Porterville Beach were removed to facilitate the construction of the dam. Several families, including the Wilcox, Lewis, Templeton, and Kaufman families, lost their homes due to these changes.

In 1999, surveys indicated that Success Dam could potentially fail in an earthquake. Consequently, the lake level was drawn down to 28,000 acre-feet in 2004, leading to the loss of the marina and limiting recreational activities. A later study showed that the failure risk was lower than initially thought, and the reservoir was subsequently refilled to 65,000 acre-feet.

The dam, standing at 156 ft (48 m) tall, is an earth dam owned and operated by the U.S. Army Corps of Engineers. While its primary purpose is flood control, the lake also serves irrigation and recreation purposes. California State Route 190 crosses the lake via its only bridge.

== Wildlife ==
A 1,499-acre wildlife refuge (607 ha) protects a portion of the northwest shoreline and is considered to be one of the best bird-watching sites in Tulare County. American white pelicans and Canada geese are often seen on the lake, while mallards, grebes and coots shelter closer to the shore. Bald eagles have been observed over the lake. Wetlands along the shoreline provide a habitat for herons, egrets and kingfishers. The surrounding grasslands and pothole ponds form habitats for black-tailed deer, California quail, cottontails and jackrabbits. Some of the areas are open for limited hunting on a seasonal schedule. Trails allow hikers to access the area.

== In fiction ==
In the science fiction novel Lucifer's Hammer, written by Larry Niven and Jerry Pournelle, fragments of a comet strike the Earth, causing massive tidal waves to destroy most of the planet's coastal cities. Los Angeles is completely destroyed, and the collapse of dams throughout California causes the San Joaquin Valley to become an inland sea. The collapse of Success Dam is witnessed by two of the characters. After the disasters subside, an enclave of civilization forms in the fictional "Silver Valley", located slightly east or northeast of Springville, just north of the Middle Fork of the Tule River.

== Lake Recreation ==
A 5 mph boat speed limit is imposed from dusk to dawn, so water-skiing and jet-skiing are forbidden during those hours.

Rocky Hill Campground offers only non-electric sites, but has a boat launch ramp and a picnic area. Day-use Bartlett Park has picnic shelters and a playground. There are no designated beach areas, but informal swim areas are located nearby.

=== Marina ===
The original Success Marina was conceived and built in the early 1960s. The U.S. Army Corps of Engineers temporarily lowered the amount of water in the lake between 2012 and 2014 while tests were conducted regarding seismic faults near the dam. Those pool restrictions have since been eased.

== See also ==
- 2025 water release from Lake Kaweah and Lake Success
- List of dams and reservoirs in California
- List of lakes in California
