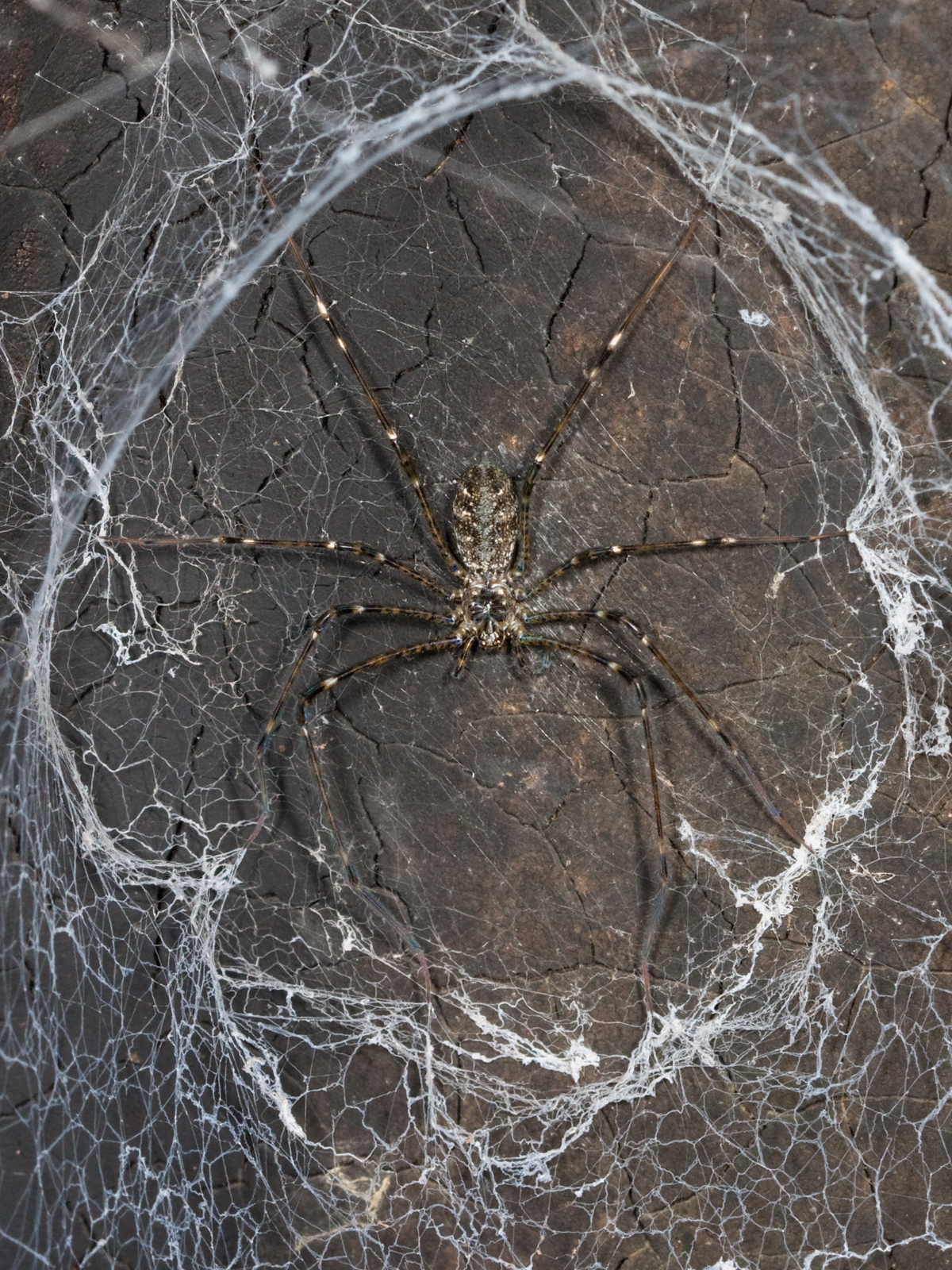
- Hypochilus pococki in web

Scientific classification
- Kingdom: Animalia
- Phylum: Arthropoda
- Subphylum: Chelicerata
- Class: Arachnida
- Order: Araneae
- Infraorder: Araneomorphae
- Family: Hypochilidae; Marx, 1888

Genera
- Ectatosticta; Hypochilus

Diversity
- 2 genera, 33 species
- blue: reported countries (WSC) green: observation hotspots (iNaturalist)

= Lampshade spider =

Lampshade spiders

Family of spiders

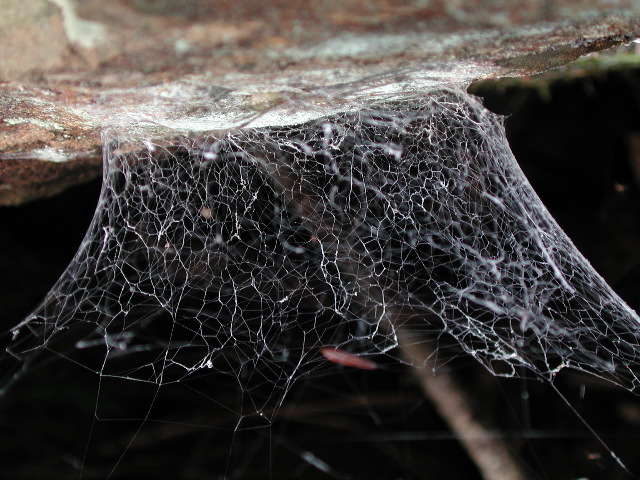
Hypochilus web in its normal orientation

Lampshade spiders, family Hypochilidae, are among the most primitive of araneomorph spiders. There are two genera and twelve species currently recognized. Like mygalomorphs, most hypochilids have two pairs of book lungs, but like araneomorphs they have intersecting fangs, with the exception of some species which have chelicerae in an angle that is neither orthognathous or labidognathous. These long-legged spiders build typical "lampshade" style webs under overhangs and in caves. In the United States the fauna is primarily associated with the Appalachian, Rocky and California Mountains. Ten of the known species are found in these ranges, all in the genus Hypochilus. The genus Ectatosticta is found in China.

In one analysis, the Hypochilidae are a sister clade to the Neocribellatae, which contains all other spider species in the Araneomorphae (Coddington & Levi, 1991, p. 576). A more recent study groups them with the Haplogynae.

== Genera ==
As of January 2026, this family includes two genera and 33 species:

- Ectatosticta Simon, 1892 – China
- Hypochilus Marx, 1888 – United States

== See also ==
- List of Hypochilidae species
- Spider families
