= List of giant sequoia groves =

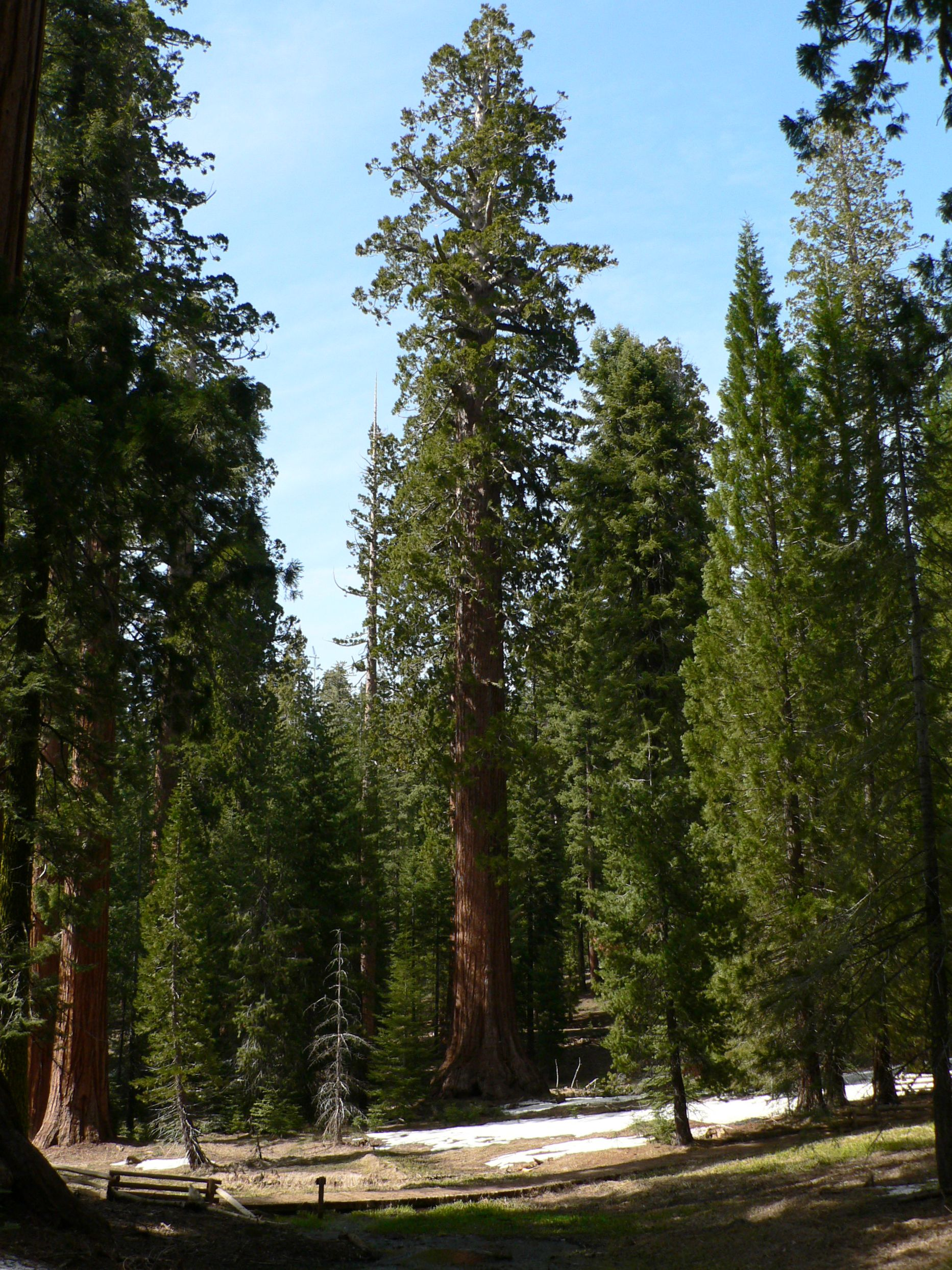
Giant sequoia in Mariposa Grove, Yosemite National Park

This is a list of giant sequoia groves. All naturally occurring giant sequoia groves are located in the moist, unglaciated ridges and valleys of the western slope of the Sierra Nevada range in California, United States. They can be found at elevations between 1,400 and 2,400 m (4,593 and 7,874 ft).

While many groves are within national park boundaries, such as Sequoia National Park and Yosemite National Park, most of the giant sequoia groves are under the care of the United States Forest Service, placing them outside the legislative mandate that excludes commercial timber harvest. Logging of non-sequoia timber continued as recently as the 1980, especially old-growth ponderosa and sugar pine, which have been logged almost to extinction amongst the groves.

Groves in the northern half of the range (north of the Kings River) are widely scattered and host smaller collections of giant sequoias than groves found within and south of the Kings River watershed. The total area of all the groves combined is approximately 14,416 ha (35,623 acres). The groves are listed from north to south in the list below.

This list is based on five different sources, with slightly varying views on what constitutes a discrete grove; the differing interpretations are noted in italics. The lists of groves were compiled by Rundel (1972; recognizing 75 groves), Flint (1987; recognizing 65 groves), Willard (1994; recognizing 65 groves), the Giant Sequoia National Monument Visitor's Guide (2003), and the Draft Giant Sequoia National Monument Plan 2010. Currently, the U.S. National Park Service cites Rundel's total of 75 groves in its visitor publications. The updated lists from Willard and Flint are now known to be more accurate, therefore some of Rundel's 75 groves have been removed from this list. Below compiles a list of 81 giant sequoia groves.

== North of the Kings River ==
The 7 groves north of the Kings River watershed are in Tahoe National Forest, Calaveras Big Trees State Park, Yosemite National Park, or Sierra National Forest (listed north to south):

Name	Location	Coordinates	Elevation		Comments
			(m)	(ft)	
Placer County Big Trees Grove	Tahoe National Forest; Placer County	39°03′30″N 120°34′30″W	1,700	5,600	The northernmost grove, with only six trees, the largest being 3.66 m (12.0 ft) in diameter. The grove is also the furthest removed from all other giant sequoia groves. Part of the American River watershed.
North Calaveras Grove	Calaveras Big Trees State Park; Calaveras County	38°17′N 120°18′W	1,425–1,480	4,675–4,856	The first giant sequoia grove to be visited by Europeans (1833), as well as the first to be documented (1852). Part of the Calaveras River watershed.
South Calaveras Grove	Calaveras Big Trees State Park; Tuolumne County	38°15′N 120°14′W	1,390–1,500	4,560–4,920	The lowest average elevation of any giant sequoia grove. Includes the Louis Agassiz tree, one of the largest giant sequoias in the world. Part of the Stanislaus River watershed.
Tuolumne Grove	Yosemite National Park; Tuolumne County	37°46′N 119°48′W	1,700–1,800	5,600–5,900	The grove features about six visible giant sequoias amongst a dense understory of dogwood. Includes the "Dead Giant", a fallen giant sequoia with a stagecoach-sized tunnel cut through it. Part of the Tuolumne River watershed.
Merced Grove	Yosemite National Park; Mariposa County	37°45′N 119°50′W	1,700–1,800	5,600–5,900	The grove features about 20 large trees. Part of the Merced River watershed.
Mariposa Grove	Yosemite National Park; Mariposa County	37°31′N 119°36′W	1,750–2,050	5,740–6,730	Includes the 'Grizzly Giant' and many other famous trees. Part of the Merced River watershed.
Nelder Grove	Sierra National Forest; Madera County	37°26′N 119°35′W	1,600–1,700	5,200–5,600	Three units, partially logged; site of the Shadow of the Giants National Recreation Trail. This grove was heavily impacted by the Railroad Fire in 2017. Part of the Fresno River watershed.

== Kings River watershed ==
The 18 groves in the Kings River watershed are in Kings Canyon National Park, the northern section of Giant Sequoia National Monument, or Sequoia National Forest, in southern Fresno County and northern Tulare County (listed north to south):

Name	Location	Coordinates	Elevation		Comments
			(m)	(ft)	
McKinley Grove	Sierra National Forest; Fresno County	37°01′N 119°06′W	1,900–1,950	6,230–6,400	The grove features between 150 and 200 large trees.
Converse Basin Grove	Giant Sequoia National Monument; Sequoia National Forest	36°48′N 118°58′W	1,800–2,000	5,900–6,600	The grove was the second-largest giant sequoia grove before being heavily logged in the 1890s. Despite this, nearly 100 widely scattered old-growth trees remain and has experienced significant regrowth. The grove is also the home of the Boole Tree, the 6th largest giant sequoia in the world. It is also the home of the Chicago Stump, the remnant of what was once the General Noble tree which was the second largest tree in the grove. This grove was significantly impacted by the Rough Fire in 2015.
Indian Basin Grove	Giant Sequoia National Monument; Sequoia National Forest	36°48′N 118°56′W	1,800–2,000	5,900–6,600	A mid-size grove that was logged between 1901 and 1907. The grove contains many young sequoias approaching diameters of up to 3.05 m (10.0 ft).
Lockwood Grove	Giant Sequoia National Monument; Sequoia National Forest	36°48′N 118°52′W	1,700–1,800	5,600–5,900	Part of the Evans Complex. The grove was heavily impacted by the Rough Fire in 2015, which killed 14 trees with diameters of at least 1.22 m (4.0 ft).
Monarch Grove	Giant Sequoia National Monument; Sequoia National Forest	36°47′30″N 118°46′45″W	1,600–1,900	5,200–6,200	Immediately north of the Agnew Grove, near Monarch Wilderness boundary. On Forest Service GSNM map. Despite its close proximity to Agnew Grove, this grove was not significantly impacted by the Rough Fire in 2015.
Agnew Grove	Giant Sequoia National Monument; Sequoia National Forest	36°47′20″N 118°46′45″W	1,950–2,000	6,400–6,560	This grove was heavily impacted by the Rough Fire in 2015.
Deer Meadow Grove	Giant Sequoia National Monument; Sequoia National Forest	36°47′20″N 118°46′45″W	1,950–2,000	6,400–6,560	This grove was heavily impacted by the Rough Fire in 2015.
Cherry Gap Grove	Giant Sequoia National Monument; Sequoia National Forest	36°46′40″N 118°57′30″W	2,070	6,790	Logged. Located between Converse Basin Grove and General Grant Grove, near McGee Overlook. This grove was significantly impacted by the Rough Fire in 2015.
Evans Grove	Giant Sequoia National Monument; Sequoia National Forest	36°46′26″N 118°49′09″W	2,050–2,250	6,730–7,380	Heavily logged before 1920. Part of Evans Grove Complex. This grove was heavily impacted by the Rough Fire in 2015.
Abbott Creek Grove	Giant Sequoia National Monument; Sequoia National Forest	36°46′N 118°58′W	1,900	6,200	Listed by Rundel and Flint; very small (largely logged); too few trees to qualify as a grove according to Willard.
Kennedy Grove	Giant Sequoia National Monument; Kings Canyon National Park; Sequoia National Forest	36°46′0″N 118°49′20″W	2,050–2,250	6,730–7,380	Home of 'Ishi Giant'. Part of Evans Complex. This grove was heavily impacted by the Rough Fire in 2015.
Little Boulder Creek Grove	Giant Sequoia National Monument; Sequoia National Forest	36°45′10″N 118°49′0″W	2,000	6,600	This grove features about 20 large trees scattered along an old logging road. Part of Evans Complex. This grove was heavily impacted by the Rough Fire in 2015.
Bearskin Grove	Giant Sequoia National Monument; Sequoia National Forest	36°45′0″N 118°54′40″W	1,850–1,900	6,070–6,230	The grove was the first to be affected by the clearcutting of giant sequoia groves by U.S. Forest Service in the 1980s. Features many large giant sequoias along road 13S98A, which runs through the heart of the grove.
Boulder Creek Grove	Giant Sequoia National Monument; Sequoia National Forest	36°45′N 118°49′W	2,050	6,730	Part of Evans Complex. This grove was heavily impacted by the Rough Fire in 2015.
General Grant Grove	Giant Sequoia National Monument; Kings Canyon National Park; Sequoia National Forest	36°45′N 118°58′W	1,750–2,000	5,740–6,560	Includes the General Grant Tree. This grove was significantly impacted by the Rough Fire in 2015.
Landslide Grove	Giant Sequoia National Monument; Sequoia National Forest	36°45′0″N 118°51′50″W	2,050–2,250	6,730–7,380	
Sequoia Creek Grove	Kings Canyon National Park	36°43′50″N 118°58′20″W	1,850	6,070	
Big Stump Grove	Giant Sequoia National Monument; Kings Canyon National Park; Sequoia National Forest	36°43′N 118°58′W	1,850	6,070	Includes the Burnt Monarch, the remains of which are larger than any living tree.

== Kaweah River watershed ==
The 31 groves in the Kaweah River watershed are all in Sequoia National Park or in mixed BLM and private ownership, except the northernmost in Sequoia National Forest and Kings Canyon National Park (listed north to south):

Name	Location	Coordinates	Elevation		Comments
			(m)	(ft)	
Redwood Mountain Grove	Giant Sequoia National Monument; Kings Canyon National Park; Sequoia National Forest	36°41′38″N 118°55′08″W	1,960	6,430	The largest grove, 1240 hectares (3100 acres), with 15,800 sequoias 30.5 cm (1.00 ft) or more in diameter at the base. Home of the Roosevelt and Hart Trees, the 22nd and 25th largest giant sequoias in the world, respectively. This grove was heavily impacted by the KNP Complex Fire in 2021.
Big Baldy South Grove	Giant Sequoia National Monument; Sequoia National Forest	36°39′40″N 118°54′05″W	1,722	5,650	
Lost Grove	Sequoia National Park	36°39′04″N 118°49′39″W	2,030	6,660	Contains no exceptionally large trees, but one giant sequoia has a ground perimeter of 31.88 m (104.6 ft), one of the largest of any giant sequoia.
Muir Grove	Sequoia National Park	36°37′53″N 118°50′10″W	1,918	6,293	A dense collection of giant sequoias at the end of a 3.1 km (1.9 mi) trail. Home of 'Dalton', the 36th largest giant sequoia in the world.
Skagway Grove	Sequoia National Park	36°37′00″N 118°50′55″W	1,820	5,970	
Pine Ridge Grove	Sequoia National Park	36°37′12″N 118°51′41″W	1,523	4,997	
Suwanee Grove	Sequoia National Park	36°35′21″N 118°47′53″W	1,880	6,170	A 28.3 hectare (70 acre) grove. This grove was heavily impacted by the KNP Complex Fire in 2021.
Giant Forest	Sequoia National Park	36°33′45″N 118°45′05″W	2,130	6,990	This grove contains half of the ten largest trees by volume, including the largest, General Sherman Tree, and 8,400 others at least 0.3 m (0.98 ft) in diameter.
Granite Creek Grove	Sequoia National Park	36°32′18″N 118°37′39″W	1,921	6,302	An exceptionally small grove located along Granite Creek.
Redwood Meadow Grove	Sequoia National Park	36°31′47″N 118°38′38″W	1,690	5,540	
Little Redwood Meadow Grove	Sequoia National Park	36°30′45″N 118°36′52″W	2,369	7,772	Located southeast of Redwood Meadow Grove.
Castle Creek Grove	Sequoia National Park	36°31′11″N 118°41′06″W	1,610	5,280	A 345-acre grove of widely scattered sequoias.
Douglass Grove	Sequoia National Park	36°28′42″N 118°43′22″W	1,967	6,453	An exceptionally small grove west of Paradise Peak and north of Oriole Lake Grove.
Atwell Mill Grove	Sequoia National Park	36°27′57″N 118°40′50″W	2,100	6,900	The grove reaches the highest elevation of any sequoia grove, 2,560 m (8,400 ft), and contains four trees that are among the largest giant sequoias in the world: Diamond, AD, Dean and Arm.
East Fork Grove	Sequoia National Park	36°26′45.2″N 118°39′48.4″W	1,646–2,487	5,400–8,159	A large, unlogged giant sequoia grove home to many widely dispersed giant sequoias. Located immediately southeast of Atwell Mill Grove and Atwell Mill Campground, along the northern slopes of Hengst Peak.
Oriole Lake Grove	Sequoia National Park	36°28′08″N 118°43′36″W	2,030	6,660	Located northeast of Oriole Lake.
New Oriole Lake Grove	Sequoia National Park	36°27′04″N 118°44′10″W	1,743	5,719	Located south of Oriole Lake. This grove was heavily impacted by the KNP Complex Fire in 2021.
Eden Creek Grove	Sequoia National Park	36°24′34″N 118°43′55″W	1,720	5,640	A 350 hectare (865 acre) grove with many large, widely scattered trees.
Lower Horse Creek Grove	Sequoia National Park	36°25′10″N 118°42′17″W	1,644	5,394	A small grove located downstream of both Horse Creek and Cahoon Creek groves.
Horse Creek Grove	Sequoia National Park	36°25′02″N 118°41′37″W	1,840	6,040	A (36.4 hectare (90 acre) grove containing approximately 70 trees more than 3 metres (9.8 ft) in diameter.
Cahoon Creek Grove	Sequoia National Park	36°24′40″N 118°42′08″W	1,834	6,017	
Case Mountain Grove	Near Three Rivers, California	36°24′18″N 118°47′37″W	1,750	5,740	Located in a bowl-shaped valley southeast of Case Mountain. The land is administered by the Bureau of Land Management.
Coffeepot Canyon Grove	Sequoia National Park	36°23′57″N 118°45′01″W	1,762	5,781	Located west of Eden Creek Grove.
Surprise Grove	Sequoia National Park	36°22′38″N 118°45′57″W	1,697	5,568	
Homers Nose Grove	Sequoia National Park	36°22′53″N 118°44′14″W	2,330	7,640	This grove was heavily impacted by the Castle Fire in 2020.
Board Camp Grove	Sequoia National Park	36°22′08″N 118°42′51″W	2,022	6,634	Located northeast of Cedar Flat Grove, southeast of Homers Nose Grove, and north of South Fork Grove. This grove was heavily impacted by the Castle Fire in 2020.
Cedar Flat Grove	Sequoia National Park	36°21′28″N 118°43′57″W	1,504	4,934	A small grove located at the northern end of Ladybug Trail.
South Fork Grove	Sequoia National Park	36°21′28″N 118°43′05″W	1,630	5,350	
Garfield Grove	Sequoia National Park	36°20′00″N 118°43′06″W	2,030	6,660	A 549 hectare (1,356 acre) grove with many large specimens. The lowest elevation at which the giant sequoia is known to grow naturally, 884 m (2,900 ft), is located beside the river below this grove. Home of the King Arthur Tree, formerly the 9th largest giant sequoia in the world. King Arthur died in the Castle Fire in 2020, although the grove itself was not heavily impacted. Now also includes the Dillonwood Grove.
Forgotten Grove	Sequoia National Park	36°19′58″N 118°45′55″W	1,916	6,286	A "grove" consisting of only two sequoias, the medium-sized 'Upper' sequoia and the larger 'Lower' sequoia. Discovered in the 1990s, although the existence of a rough trail indicates that previous park officials knew of them. This grove was heavily impacted by the Castle Fire in 2020, and the 'Upper' sequoia may be either dead or moribund.
Devil's Canyon Grove	Sequoia National Park	36°19′12″N 118°46′05″W	2,004	6,575	Located north of Dennison Grove and west of Dennison Mountain in the southwestern corner of Sequoia National Park.

== Tule River, Kern River, and Deer Creek watersheds ==
The 25 groves in the Tule River, Kern River, and Deer Creek watersheds are mostly in Giant Sequoia National Monument, with some areas in Sequoia National Park, Mountain Home Demonstration State Forest, and Tule River Reservation; all are in southern Tulare County (listed north to south):

Name	Location	Coordinates	Elevation		Comments
			(m)	(ft)	
Dennison Grove	Sequoia National Park	36°18′48″N 118°45′47″W	1,966	6,450	Located on the southwestern slope of Dennison Mountain in southeastern Sequoia National Park.
Dillonwood Grove	Giant Sequoia National Monument; Sequoia National Forest; Sequoia National Park	36°18′13″N 118°42′35″W	1,837	6,027	Located at the southernmost point of Sequoia National Park. This grove was heavily impacted by the Castle Fire in 2020.
Upper Tule Grove	Giant Sequoia National Monument; Sequoia National Forest	36°16′36″N 118°40′27″W	2,400	7,900	The highest average elevation of any giant sequoia grove, located immediately east of Moses Mountain. Included on Forest Service GSNM map.
Middle Tule Grove	Sequoia National Forest; Sequoia National Forest	36°16′07″N 118°39′46″W	2,062	6,765	
Maggie Mountain Grove	Giant Sequoia National Monument; Sequoia National Forest	36°15′41″N 118°38′26″W	2,234	7,329	A small, inaccessible grove located in a ravine just west of Maggie Mountain.
Silver Creek Grove	Giant Sequoia National Monument; Sequoia National Forest	36°14′29″N 118°38′54″W	1,650	5,410	
Mountain Home Grove	Balch County Park; Mountain Home Demonstration State Forest; Giant Sequoia National Monument; Sequoia National Forest	36°14′24″N 118°40′18″W	1,970	6,460	Home of the Genesis Tree, the 7th largest giant sequoia in the world. This grove also contains the smaller Middle Tule Grove in the Sequoia National Forest. This grove was heavily impacted by the Pier Fire in 2017 and the Castle Fire in 2020.
Burro Creek Grove	Giant Sequoia National Monument; Sequoia National Forest	36°13′31″N 118°38′38″W	1,550	5,090	
Wishon Grove	Giant Sequoia National Monument; Sequoia National Forest	36°13′04″N 118°38′57″W	1,393	4,570	Located south of Silver Creek Grove. Included on Forest Service GSNM map.
Alder Creek Grove	Giant Sequoia National Monument; Sequoia National Forest; Private land	36°11′08″N 118°37′41″W	2,120	6,960	Also known as Hossack, Pixley, or Ross Creek Grove. Home of the Stagg Tree, the 5th largest giant sequoia in the world. Also home to the now-deceased Waterfall tree, which had the largest ground perimeter of any sequoia. This grove was heavily impacted by the Castle Fire in 2020, leading to Waterfall's death.
Freeman Creek Grove	Giant Sequoia National Monument; Sequoia National Forest	36°08′22″N 118°30′33″W	1,890	6,200	The easternmost giant sequoia grove. Home of 'Great Goshawk' and 'Bannister', the 29th and 48th largest giant sequoias, respectively. Part of the Kern River watershed. This grove was heavily impacted by the Castle Fire in 2020.
McIntyre Grove	Giant Sequoia National Monument; Sequoia National Forest	36°08′07″N 118°35′05″W	1,720	5,640	Part of Belknap Complex. This grove was heavily impacted by the Castle Fire in 2020.
Carr Wilson Grove	Giant Sequoia National Monument; Sequoia National Forest	36°07′32″N 118°36′38″W	1,512	4,961	Also known as Bear Creek Grove. Part of Belknap Complex.
Wheel Meadow Grove	Giant Sequoia National Monument; Sequoia National Forest	36°06′40″N 118°33′54″W	2,012	6,601	Part of Belknap Complex. This grove was heavily impacted by the Castle Fire in 2020.
Black Mountain Grove	Giant Sequoia National Monument; Sequoia National Forest; Tule River Reservation; Private land	36°06′16″N 118°39′19″W	1,950	6,400	Heavily logged in 1984, though no mature sequoias were cut. This grove was heavily impacted by the Pier Fire in 2017.
Red Hill Grove	Giant Sequoia National Monument; Sequoia National Forest; Private land	36°04′17″N 118°36′46″W	1,960	6,430	This grove was heavily impacted by the Windy Fire in 2021.
Peyrone Grove	Giant Sequoia National Monument; Sequoia National Forest; Tule River Reservation	36°03′07″N 118°36′22″W	1,880	6,170	Medium-sized grove containing more than 100 scattered specimens. This grove was significantly impacted by the Windy Fire in 2021.
South Peyrone Grove	Giant Sequoia National Monument; Sequoia National Forest	36°01′32″N 118°37′17″W	1,851	6,073	New discovery by Willard in 1992. Located west of Onion Meadow Peak. This grove was significantly impacted by the Windy Fire in 2021.
Parker Peak Grove	Tule River Reservation	35°59′10″N 118°39′22″W	1,980	6,500	Medium-sized grove containing more than 100 scattered specimens.
Long Meadow Grove	Giant Sequoia National Monument; Sequoia National Forest	35°58′58″N 118°36′05″W	2,040	6,690	Site of the "Trail of 100 Giants", a popular loop trail that winds through the heart of the grove. Home of 'Red Chief', the 40th largest giant sequoia in the world. Part of the Kern River watershed. This grove was heavily impacted by the Windy Fire in 2021.
Cunningham Grove	Giant Sequoia National Monument; Sequoia National Forest	35°58′56″N 118°34′06″W	1,870	6,140	Part of the Kern River watershed.
Starvation Creek Grove	Giant Sequoia National Monument; Sequoia National Forest	35°56′03″N 118°37′26″W	1,730	5,680	A small, inaccessible giant sequoia grove. Part of the Starvation Creek Complex and the Deer Creek watershed. This grove was heavily impacted by the Windy Fire in 2021, and only four out of an estimated 122 trees survived.
Powderhorn Grove	Sequoia National Forest; Giant Sequoia National Monument	35°55′53″N 118°36′14″W	2,022	6,634	A small giant sequoia grove. Part of the Starvation Creek Complex and the Kern River watershed. This grove was heavily impacted by the Windy Fire in 2021.
Packsaddle Grove	Giant Sequoia National Monument; Sequoia National Forest	35°55′26″N 118°35′34″W	2,060	6,760	A grove of about 300 large but scattered trees, including the now-deceased 'Packsaddle Giant', formerly the 33rd largest giant sequoia measuring over 6.7 m (22 ft) in diameter and 85.34 m (280.0 ft) tall. Part of the Kern River watershed. This grove was heavily impacted by the Windy Fire in 2021.
Deer Creek Grove	Giant Sequoia National Monument; Sequoia National Forest	35°52′19″N 118°36′12″W	1,800	5,900	The grove is southernmost giant sequoia grove and is home to a small collection of 31 widely dispersed giant sequoias. Part of the Deer Creek watershed. This grove was heavily impacted by the Windy Fire in 2021.

== See also ==
- Black Mountain Grove (Southern California) – Giant sequoia grove in Riverside County, California, United States
- List of individual trees
- List of largest giant sequoias
