= KNP Complex Fire =

2021 wildfire in Central California

- Part of the 2021 California wildfires
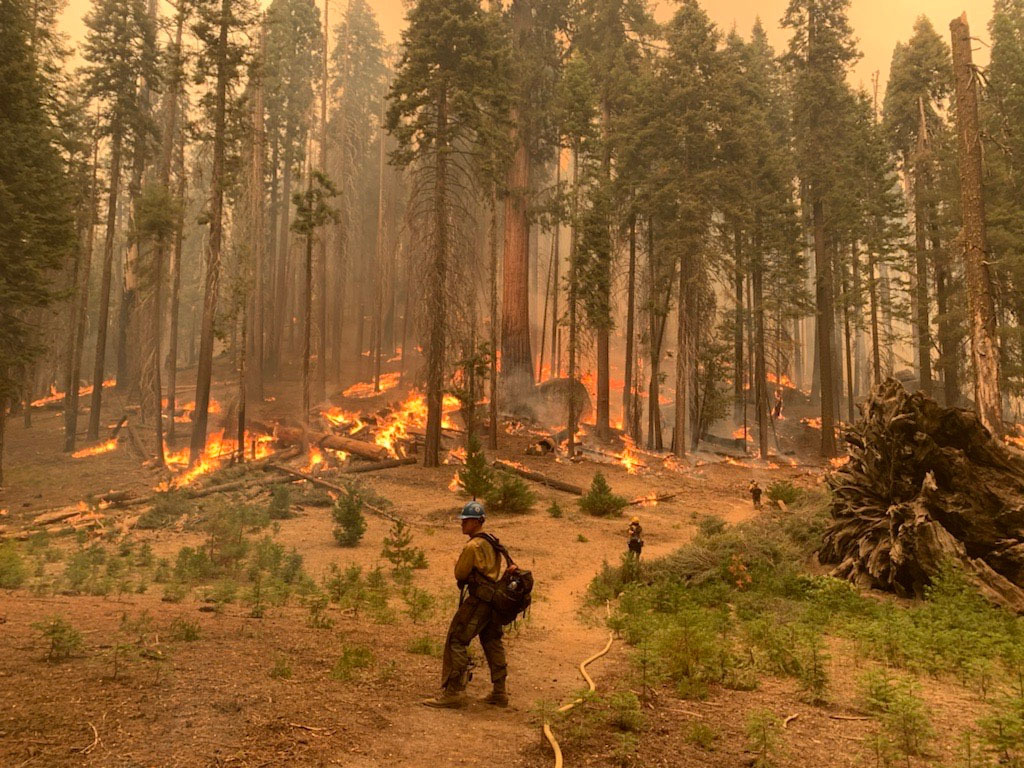
- Firefighters monitor a low-intensity burnout operation in a giant sequoia grove
- Date: September 9 –; December 16, 2021; (99 days)
- Location: Tulare County, Central California, United States
- Coordinates: 36.567°N 118.811°W

Statistics
- Burned area: 88,307 acres (35,737 ha; 138 sq mi; 357 km^{2})

Impacts
- Injuries: ≥5
- Evacuated: ≥659
- Structures destroyed: 4
- Cost: $170 million; (cost of suppression)

Ignition
- Cause: Lightning

Map
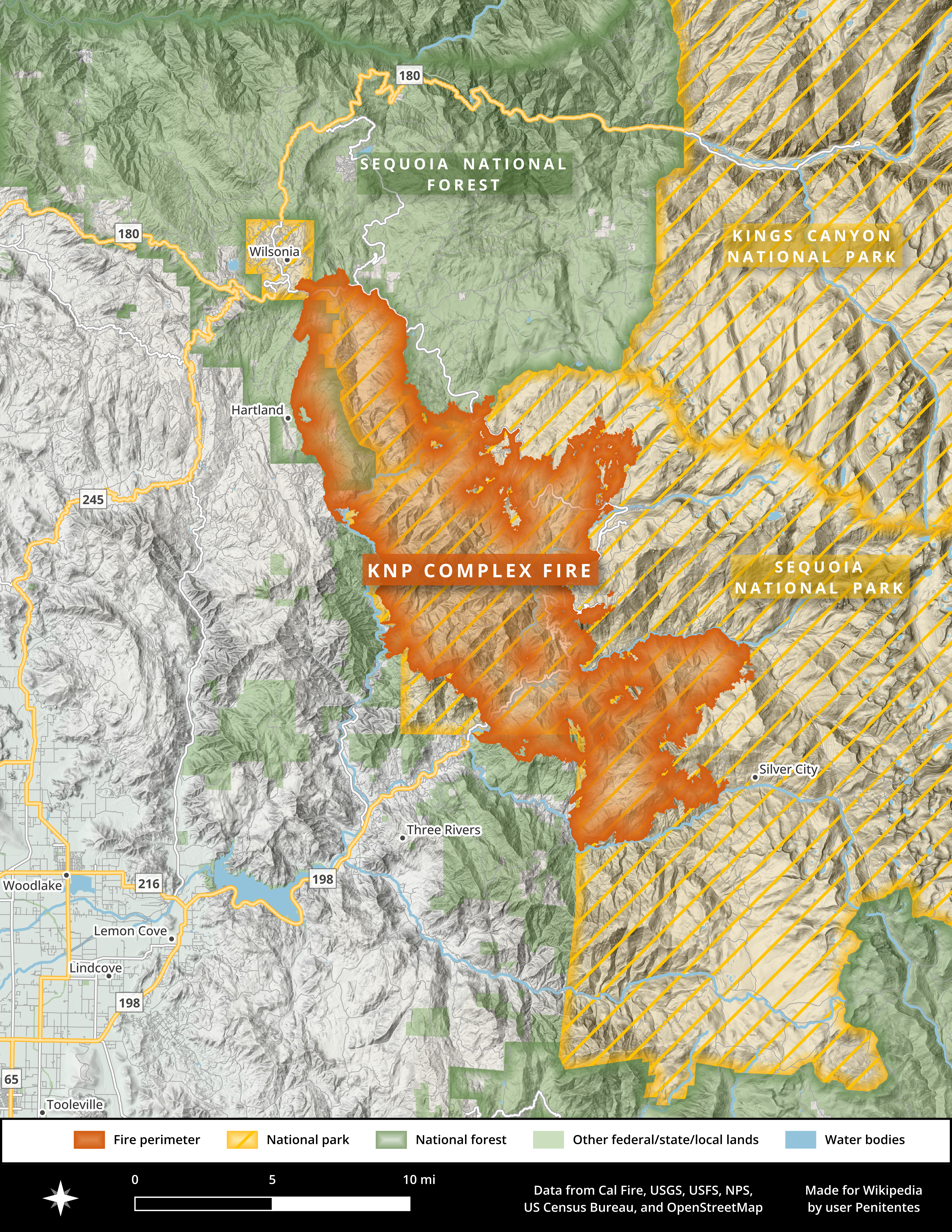
- The majority of the KNP Complex Fire lay within the footprint of Sequoia National Park

- The fire burned in Tulare County, on the Sierra Nevada's western slope

The 2021 KNP Complex Fire was a large wildfire in Sequoia National Park and the Sequoia National Forest in Central California's Tulare County. After lightning ignited the Paradise and Colony fires in the southern Sierra Nevada on September 9, the twin blazes merged and burned a total of 88,307 acres (35,737 hectares). The fire was not declared contained until mid-December, after several atmospheric rivers delivered rain and snow to the mountains. The number of firefighting personnel reached more than 2,000 and firefighting costs surpassed $170 million.

The KNP Complex forced the communities of Three Rivers, Wilsonia, and Cedar Grove to evacuate, and caused the temporary closure of Sequoia and Kings Canyon National Parks while damaging roads, trails, and cabins within. The fire also heavily impacted the endangered giant sequoia, which grows in less than a hundred natural groves in the western Sierra Nevada. National Park Service scientists calculated that the KNP Complex Fire killed roughly 1,300–2,400 large giant sequoias (hundreds more died in the Windy Fire in the Sequoia National Forest, which burned contemporaneously). The fires are estimated to have killed three to five percent of the total population of large giant sequoias.

== Background ==
The KNP Complex Fire took place during a severe fire season for the western United States, and particularly for California. During the state's 2021 wildfire season nearly 2.6 million acres (1,100,000 ha) burned: the second largest area on record after 2020. The national preparedness level hit the maximum level of 5 on July 14 and remained there until September 20, the longest period on record. Officials took drastic measures to try and limit new ignitions: between August 31 and September 15, the U.S. Forest Service’s Pacific Southwest Region closed all of California's national forests to public use because of fire conditions.

=== Fuels and climate ===
In the decades preceding the fire, average temperatures in the Sierra increased measurably even as precipitation did not. This trend was driven partly by climate change. Climate change and consequent warming in California has helped produce hotter and more severe droughts, such as the one California endured between 2012 and 2016. Acute stress from that drought killed many trees in the Sierra Nevada, particularly at middling elevations.

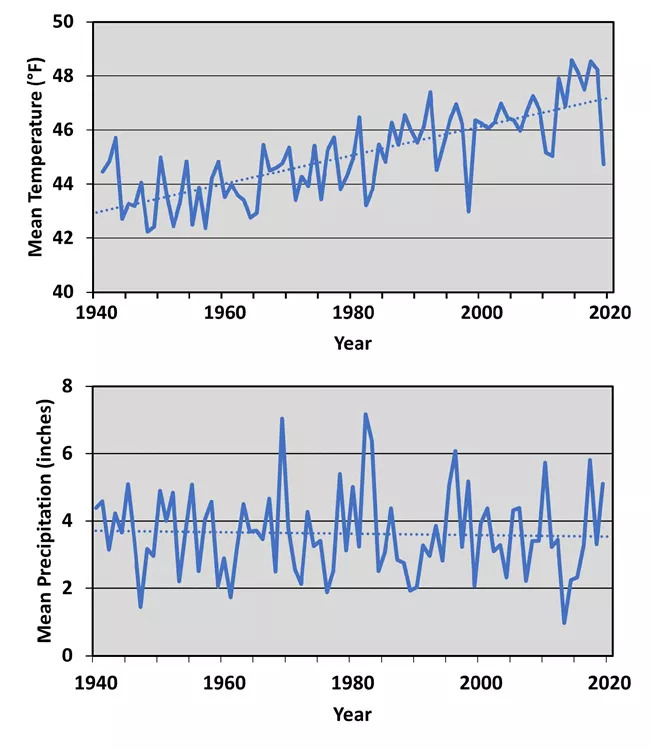
Climatic trends from 1940–2019 in Sequoia National Park show rising temperatures (top), without increased precipitation (bottom)

The lack of water also crippled trees' abilities to resist the predations of bark beetles, which resulted in "greatly elevated mortality" for many major tree species in Sequoia National Park, including the ponderosa pine, the sugar pine, the incense-cedar, and the white fir. Annual tree mortality rates nearly doubled in the park just between 1983 and 2004. A park representative estimated in 2021 that Sequoia and Kings Canyon National Parks held over one million beetle-killed trees that were helping drive the KNP Complex Fire.

California saw its second-driest water year ever in 2020–2021, exceeded only by that of 1923–1924. It was the driest ever water year on record for the southern Sierra Nevada, with 9.9 inches (25 cm) of rainfall compared to the region's average of 28.8 inches (73 cm). The summer of 2021 was also California's hottest ever recorded. The hot and dry conditions kept vegetation moisture levels "critically low".

The drought and dead trees added to the high levels of vegetation that had already accumulated in Sierra Nevada forests. Prior to European-American settlement, frequent fires of lower severity occurred, leaving most sequoia trees unharmed and aiding regeneration in the forest by consuming dry fuels. This ceased in the 20th century when the U.S. federal government began extinguishing every wildfire as a matter of policy. This led to elevated fuel loads in forests, including giant sequoia groves.

Not until the 1960s was fire reintroduced to some groves. While approximately 30,000 acres (12,000 ha) used to burn naturally and annually in the Sequoia and Kings Canyon parks, as of 2022 the parks burned only around 10,000 acres (4,000 ha) annually in prescribed burns. Much of the KNP Complex Fire footprint had no recent wildfire burn history. A 2023 study identified "old, large-diameter fuels like fallen logs" as the likely culprit for the fire's high intensity after analyzing radiocarbon signatures in samples of the smoke, consistent with prior research demonstrating that fire suppression and the resulting accumulation of fuels have contributed to elevated fire intensities in the Sierra Nevada.

== Progression ==
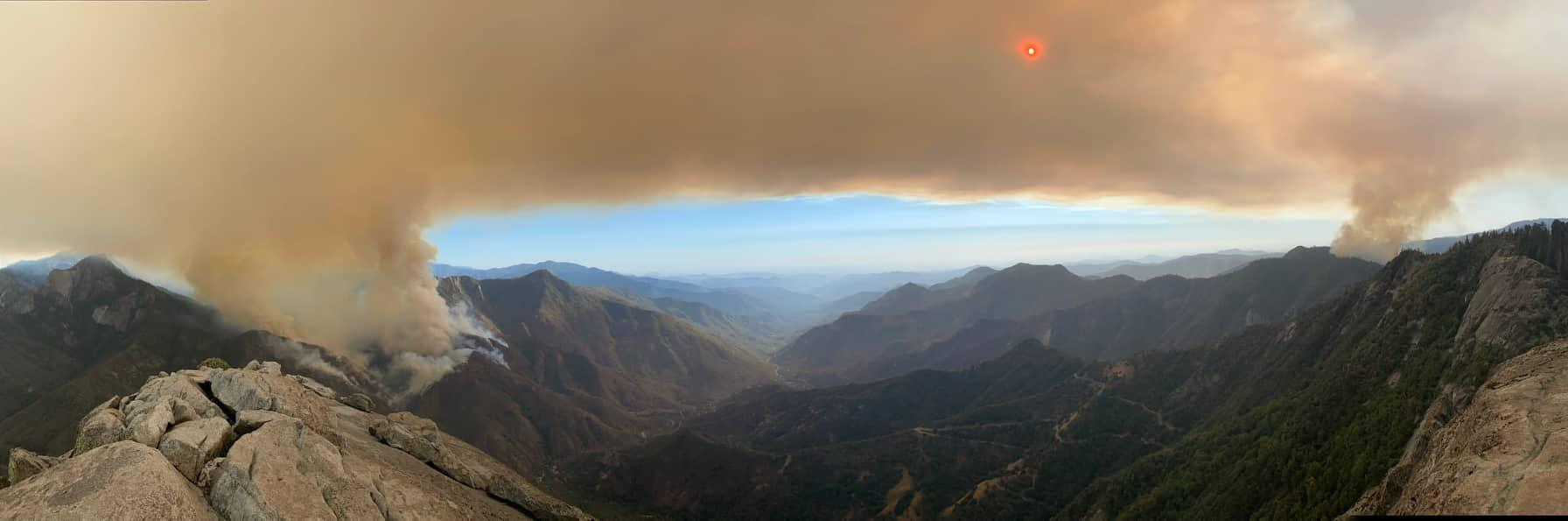
Looking westward, the Paradise (left) and Colony (right) fires burn on either side of the Kaweah River drainage on September 13, 2021

=== September 9–14 ===
On the night of September 9, a series of thunderstorms moved through California, generating more than 1,100 cloud-to-ground lightning strikes across the state by the following morning. Over 200 strikes occurred in Sequoia and Kings Canyon National Parks. On September 10, three lightning-ignited fires were discovered in Sequoia National Park. One of them, the Cabin Fire, was found near Dorst Creek and fully contained at only 1.25 acres (0.51 ha).

The other two fires were the four-acre (1.6 ha) Colony Fire near Colony Peak, burning in a mixed conifer forest west of the Giant Forest and north of the Kaweah River, and the one-quarter-acre (0.10 ha) Paradise Fire west of Paradise Creek, south of the Kaweah River and burning in chaparral in rugged terrain. Campgrounds and park roads nearby closed and suppression efforts began, with handcrews on the ground and water and fire retardant drops from the air. With the combination of difficult terrain and dry weather conducive to fire spread, park officials warned that "the fires have spread potential and could affect operations in the coming days or weeks." The Colony and Paradise fires grew overnight to 72 acres (29 ha) and 32 acres (13 ha) respectively, with no containment. On September 11 the two fires, though still discrete, were christened the KNP Complex Fire.

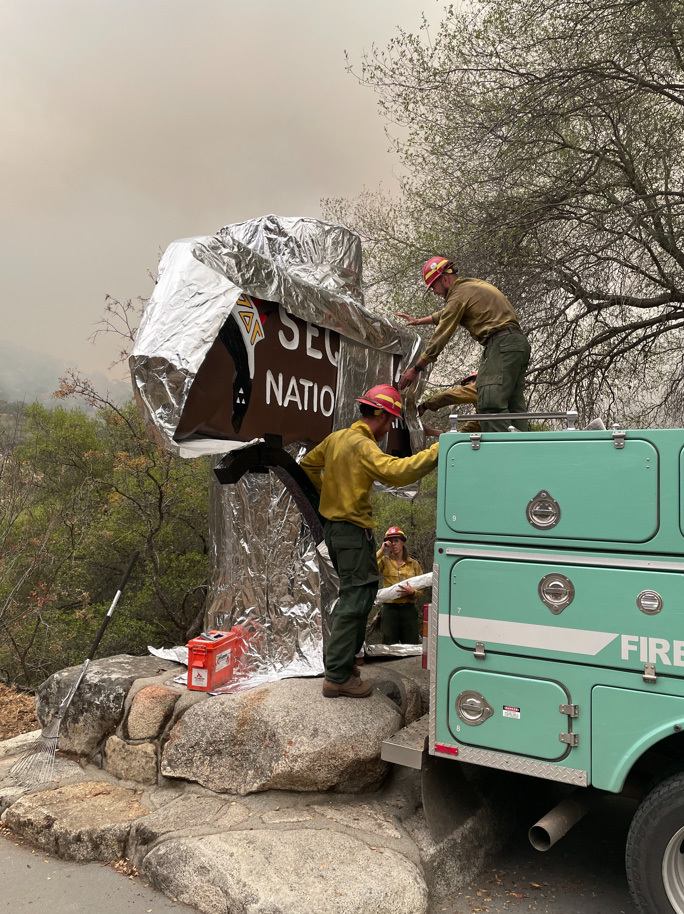
Firefighters wrap the historic Ash Mountain Entrance Sign with protective foil

Ground crews on the Colony Fire were beleaguered by six-foot (1.8 m) flames and many hazardous snags. Meanwhile, the Paradise Fire's challenging location mid-slope with no safety zones or easy access caused officials to resort to an aircraft-only strategy, hoping to use water and fire retardant drops to keep the fire north of Paradise Ridge and south of the Kaweah River. By September 13, the area burned surpassed 200 acres (81 ha) for the Colony Fire and 800 acres (320 ha) for the Paradise Fire. Evacuations were ordered for the Mineral King area, and warnings instituted for Three Rivers. The response was still hampered by the rough terrain, as officials noted that ground access to the Paradise Fire had proved "impossible" thus far. Only 130 personnel were engaged on the incident.

That night, the Paradise Fire spread down-slope to the north, crossing the Middle Fork of the Kaweah River and the Generals Highway. Park employees at the Ash Mountain Headquarters Complex and in employee housing nearby evacuated. Both fires expanded considerably over the course of the following day (September 14), taking the Paradise Fire's total burned acreage to more than 5,900 acres (2,400 ha) and the Colony Fire to more than 1,100 acres (450 ha). Sequoia National Park closed to the public.

=== September 15–October 1 ===
On September 15 and 16, both fires grew moderately and on every flank. With the arrival of a Type 1 incident management team, the number of personnel on the incident grew to more than 400, even as the combined size of the two fires reached more than 11,000 acres (4,500 ha). As the Colony Fire moved within one mile (1.6 km) of the Giant Forest, containing the General Sherman Tree and thousands of other giant sequoias, firefighters began to protect specific trees by removing vegetation from around their bases and covering parts of the trees in a protective foil wrap, usually used to protect structures and for firefighters' emergency shelters.

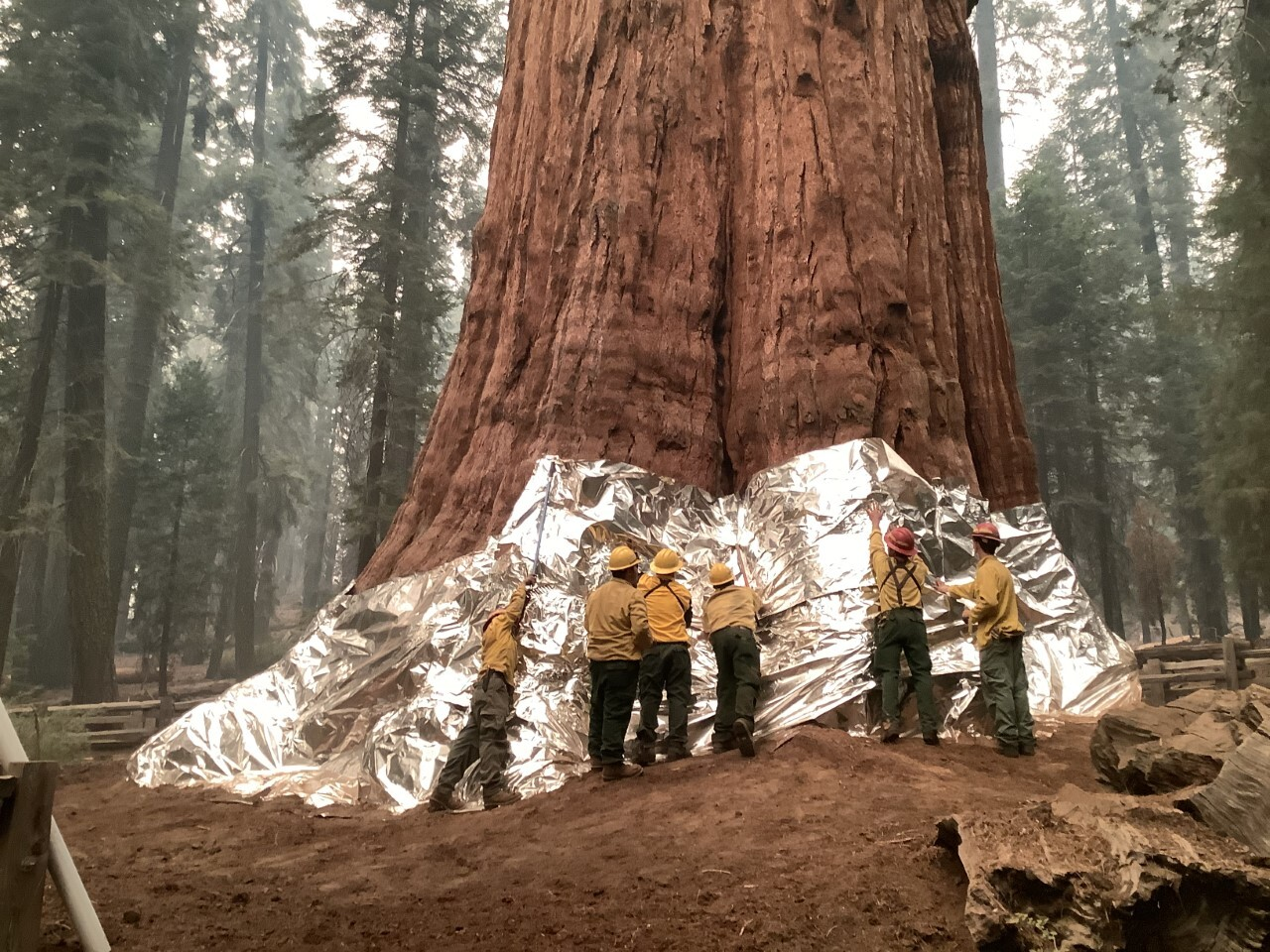
Firefighters and park personnel wrap the General Sherman Tree in protective foil to stop fire burning into old cavities or fire scars

On September 17, the Colony and Paradise fires met and merged in the drainage of the Marble Fork of the Kaweah River. Smoke that had stifled the combined fire's northeastern portion cleared away, and the resulting ventilation allowed the fire to grow. The northern portion of the blaze pushed up and out of the Marble Fork into the Halstead Creek drainage in a 6,500-acre (2,600 ha) "extreme head fire run", according to a National Park Service post-fire assessment, burning the entirety of the Suwanee Grove at almost entirely moderate to high severity. The fire also entered the westernmost edge of the Giant Forest grove for the first time, in the vicinity of the Four Guardsmen trees, but firefighters' protective efforts ensured all four survived. The total burned area reached 17,857 acres (7,226 ha) by September 18 as the complex became one of the highest-priority wildfires in the nation.

The complex slowly grew to just over 25,000 acres (10,000 ha) by September 21, causing Kings Canyon National Park to close. Portions of both parks east of the Pacific Crest Trail in the High Sierra remained open. As crews prepared for the fire's potential arrival in the Lost and Muir sequoia groves, the fire moved through the Giant Forest and reduced in intensity as it met areas that had already been treated with prescribed fire. Meanwhile, California Department of Forestry and Fire Protection (Cal Fire) personnel constructed control lines along Paradise Ridge to help check the fire's growth on its southern end.

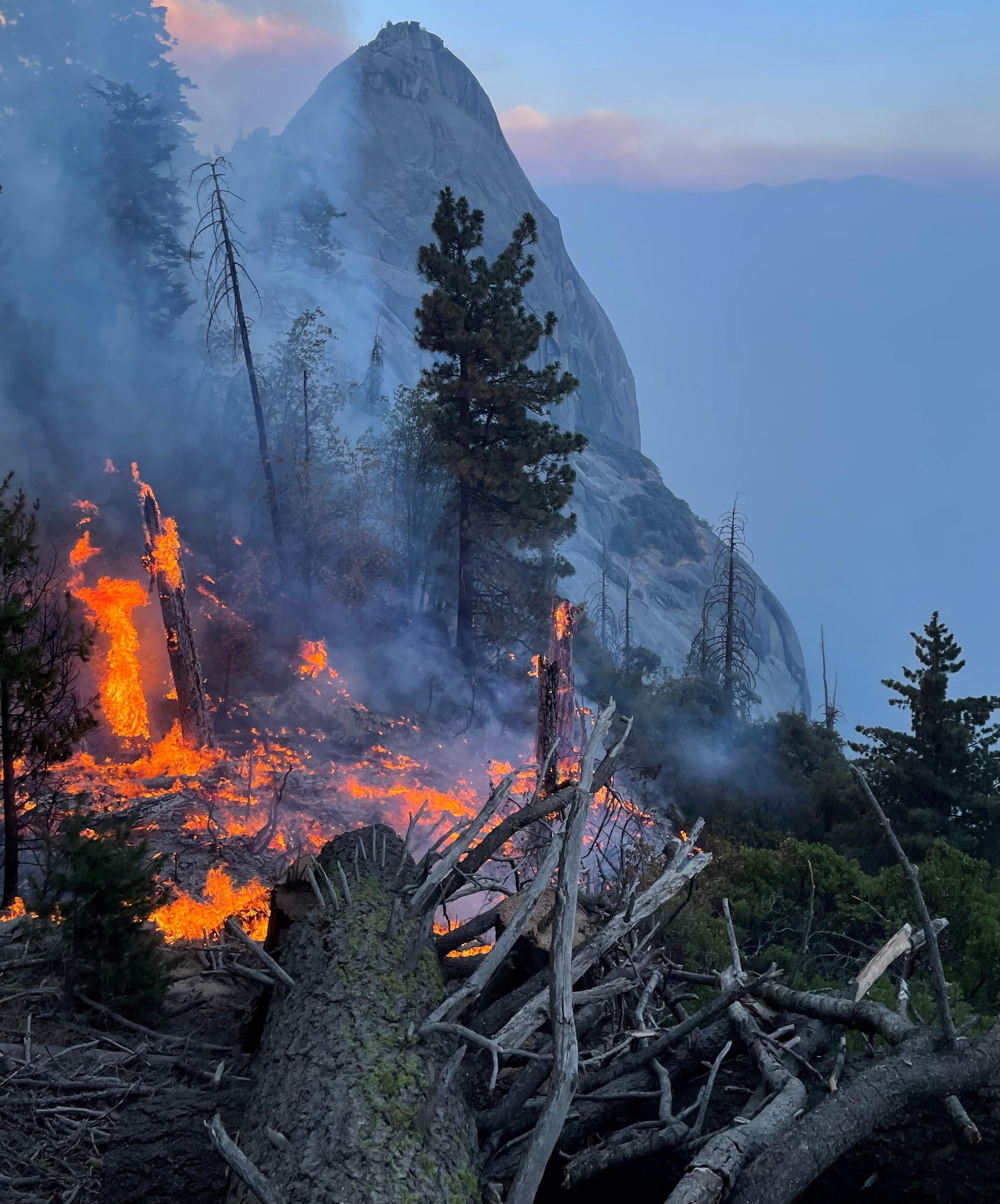
The KNP Complex Fire burns near the Giant Forest, with Moro Rock visible in the background

In late September, a high-pressure system settled in place over the area: higher humidity levels and lower temperatures, combined with a thick smoke inversion, stifled fire behavior somewhat even as the lack of visibility prevented aircraft from flying. Despite this, on September 24, fire activity ticked up as flames moved down from the conifer forests into the grass and oak woodlands closer to the visitors center in the foothills, and leapt past firefighters and their control lines on Paradise Ridge. Burnout operations helped catch the fire in the Mineral King Road and Ash Mountain areas. A giant sequoia killed by the fire fell across the Generals Highway, blocking travel between the northern and southern portions of the fire until equipment could be mustered to cut through it.

During the last week of September, the fire grew by several thousand acres per day, driven by gusty west winds. As its footprint increased, mandatory evacuation orders were issued on September 30 for Eshom and Hartland Camp in Tulare County. These orders were expanded on October 1 to include Grant Grove Village, Wilsonia, and Cedar Grove in Kings Canyon National Park, and Big Meadows, Weston Meadows, and Quail Flat areas in Giant Sequoia National Monument. Approximately 158 homes were threatened between those in Sequoia National Park, in the Lodgepole area, and in the communities of Three Rivers and Hartland. On September 30, the fire crossed the North Fork of the Kaweah River, and entered the lower portion of the Pierce Creek drainage to the north. On October 1, the fire pushed up through Pierce Creek, over the lower parts of the Redwood Mountain ridge, and into Redwood Canyon, taking the total burned area to more than 50,000 acres (20,000 ha).

=== October 1–October 5 ===
For the next two days, the fire backed down into Redwood Canyon, burning through Big Springs Grove and making occasional runs up towards Big Baldy (a high granite ridge to the east). Redwood Mountain Grove was singled out for concern—park officials knew that its southern section lay on a steep slope and was littered with excess fuel. Firefighters had begun burnout operations in the grove on October 1. Officials also decided to apply an experimental polyacrylamide fire retardant gel to the canopies of the giant sequoias, and some was dropped on trees in Muir Grove. Smoky conditions kept aircraft away from Redwood Mountain Grove, preventing gel drops there, and before long the wildfire outpaced the firefighters' burnout operations.

The fire produces a large pyrocumulonimbus cloud over the southern Sierra Nevada on October 4, as seen by the GOES-17 satellite

By October 3, the fire's footprint spanned over 60,000 acres (24,000 ha). The fire spotted across Mineral King Road, provoking evacuation orders for Sierra King Drive, Hammond, and Oak Grove. That evening, part of the fire still burning near Pierce Meadow surged up the western side of Redwood Mountain. By morning, it had merged with a fire front burning up through Redwood Canyon, and the combined head of the fire burned the central portion of the canyon, scorching the southern part of Redwood Mountain Grove at high severity. The fire burned hot in the canyon, putting up 40,000-foot (12,000 m) convective pyrocumulus or pyrocumulonimbus clouds visible from the far side of the Sierra Nevada. In the sequoia grove itself the fire generated winds strong enough to strip bark and foliage from the sequoia trees, and flames likely climbed into the canopies of the sequoias, moving from tree to tree as a crown fire. The fire's run took it across Generals Highway near Stony Creek. The Tulare County Sheriff’s Office issued immediate evacuation orders for Mineral King Road and Mineral King Drive. The fire's intensity subsided upon reaching Big Baldy and parts of the grove that had previously been treated with prescribed fire. The Redwood Canyon area growth took the fire's total burned area to just shy of 80,000 acres (32,000 ha) by October 5.

=== October 5–December 16 ===
Following the blow-up in Redwood Canyon, shifts in the weather began to enable firefighters to gain the upper hand. On October 8, storms brought rain to the whole of the fire. Some areas received as much as three-tenths of an inch (7.6 mm) of precipitation. During this same period the total number of personnel assigned to the fire peaked at over 2,000, and it remained around that level for most of the second week of October. The favorable weather, particularly on the fire's north end, allowed those crews to achieve 20 percent containment of the fire by October 10. Another storm on the night of the 17th brought more than two inches (5.1 cm) of snow to the fire area, slowing fire activity further even as hotshot crews built another contingency line beneath the Giant Forest through the snow. Containment rapidly increased to 60 percent by October 21: with a total burned area of 88,307 acres (35,737 ha), this marked the end of the fire's expansion.

On October 24, a significant atmospheric river made landfall in Northern California, delivering several inches of rain across much of the state. Though it weakened as it slid southward, two to three inches (51 to 76 mm) of rain fell on all parts of the fire and a flash flood watch was issued for the area. Christy Brigham, chief of resource management and science at Sequoia and Kings Canyon National Parks, declared it a season-ending event. At this point, with the fire largely out, much of the work was focused on repairing the damage from the suppression effort and stabilizing burned areas. A week later, control over the incident passed from the interagency incident management team back to the Forest Service and National Park Service. The KNP Complex Fire was declared completely contained on December 16, with no further growth expected outside of the existing perimeter. The area burned by the fire was calculated at 88,307 acres (35,737 ha), and the cost of fighting the fire came to $170 million.

== Giant sequoias ==
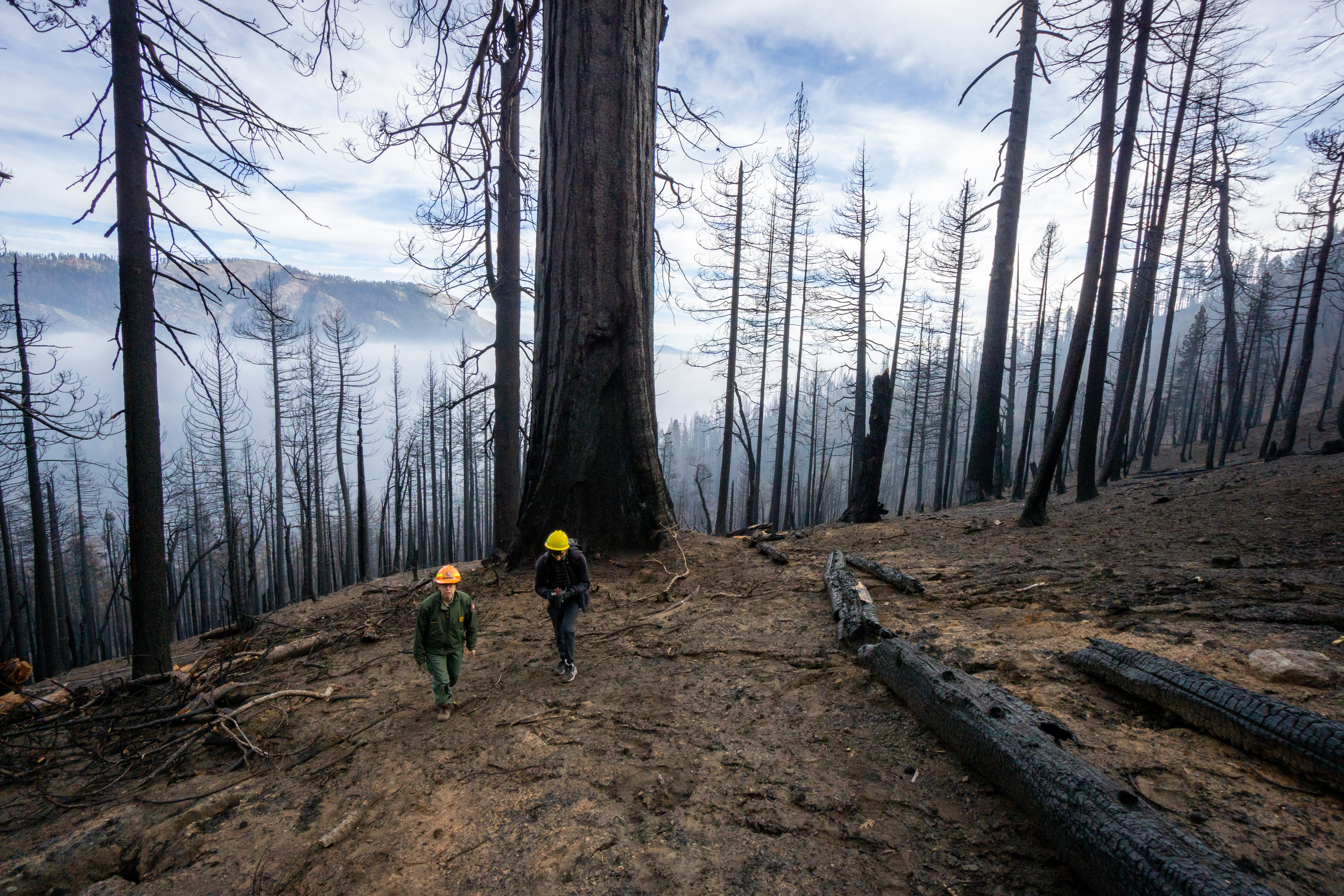
Two natural resource specialists walk through an area of Redwood Mountain Grove after the fire

Giant sequoias are typically resistant to wildfires, possessing thick bark and a canopy that grows well above the ground that protects them from smaller fires. Historically, giant sequoia groves had a fire return interval of approximately 15 years, and so long-lived giant sequoias might see dozens of wildfires throughout their lifetimes. As with the rest of the Sierra Nevada's forests, this ceased with European-American settlement. Sequoia and Kings Canyon parks together contain about 10,000 acres (4,000 ha) of giant sequoia groves, only 4,610 acres (1,870 ha) of which had seen prescribed or managed fire in the 20 years before the KNP Complex Fire. Most of that treated acreage was in the Giant Forest grove alone.

Because of the lack of milder wildfires—leading to fuel build-up—and the intensification of other factors (such as climate change and bark beetles), modern Californian wildfires burn with an increased proportion of moderate to high severity fire effects and such fires have become a "significant threat to the persistence of large sequoias", according to the Park Service's assessment. During the KNP Complex Fire's lifetime, it reached 16 separate giant sequoia groves, and affected some of them severely. The Park Service assessment reported: "Much of the fire’s growth occurred due to backing and flanking, with short uphill runs. However, in some areas terrain, fuels, and winds aligned to drive high intensity crown runs ranging from tens to hundreds of acres." Thus, while many groves received low-intensity flanking or backing fire producing effects that varied from "unburned" to "low" severity, several were affected by moderate or high severity runs that killed many mature giant sequoias. Studies have shown an 84 percent average mortality rate in old-growth sequoia groves burned at a high severity, and anecdotal evidence has shown that in multiple fires these areas fail to regenerate.

Following the fire's impingement on Castle Creek Grove and Redwood Mountain Grove, park officials wrote on Facebook that they suspected the fire had killed trees in those groves, possibly hundreds of them. Before the fire, Redwood Mountain Grove had been home to 5,509 large giant sequoias, and Castle Creek Grove home to another 419. Officials also wrote that protecting other threatened groves was the current priority and continued fire hazards precluded a complete assessment until later.

=== Sequoia mortality ===
On November 19, 2021, the Burned Area Emergency Response (BAER) team assigned to the KNP Complex Fire released their report, which discussed a variety of fire impacts, post-fire hazards, and potential actions for response. Analysis conducted by Nature Conservancy and National Park Service scientists used a combination of fire severity data, satellite imagery, aerial reconnaissance, and ground assessments to estimate possible large giant sequoia mortality from the KNP Complex Fire. In total, the National Park Service report estimated that the KNP Complex Fire killed between 1,330 and 2,380 large sequoias, defined as those over four feet (1.2 metres) in diameter. That figure includes both the sequoias killed outright and those expected to die in the three to five years following the fire. When combined with the estimated large sequoia mortality of 931–1,257 trees from the Windy Fire, the 2021 California wildfire season saw the potential loss of three to five percent of the global population of large giant sequoias. The National Park Service's assessment highlighted an "alarming trend" given the previous mortality from the Castle Fire portion of the 2020 SQF Complex Fire, which killed an estimated 10–14 percent of large sequoias (or between 7,500 and 10,600 individual trees). The mortality assessments suggest that in 2020 and 2021, 13–19 percent of the world's large sequoia population was lost in just three large wildfires. Prior to 2020, the total number of large sequoias within the groves of the Sierra Nevada was estimated at 75,580. The total number may have fallen to ~60,000 after the Castle, Windy, and KNP Complex fires.

=== Response ===
On September 23, 2021, Sequoia National Park was the backdrop for Governor Newsom's signature of a $15 billion climate change legislation package that included $1.5 billion for wildfire response and forest resilience. Newsom alluded to the nearby threatened giant sequoias in his remarks on the bill.

In June 2022, the Save Our Sequoias Act was introduced by Democratic member Scott Peters and Republican member Kevin McCarthy (whose district includes the majority of giant sequoia groves) in the House of Representatives. The bill sought to provide $350 million over the course of a decade to codify the Giant Sequoia Lands Coalition (an existing partnership between federal, state, tribal and local land managers), create a reforestation plan for groves destroyed by wildfires, and streamline the environmental review process for thinning and removing vegetation from other groves. Legislators working to draft the bill visited some of the worst-affected groves from the KNP Complex Fire in Sequoia National Park in May, prior to its introduction. Despite having 75 co-sponsors in the House, the bill was opposed by 81 environmental groups, including the Sierra Club, the League of Conservation Voters, Greenpeace, the Pacific Crest Trail Association, and Defenders of Wildlife. Their joint letter to Congress argued that the bill would "weaken existing environmental law to expedite potentially harmful logging projects that undermine the ecological integrity of sequoia groves and do nothing to protect these trees". An amended version of the legislation was introduced in the Senate in September 2022 by California senators Dianne Feinstein and Alex Padilla. The act was not passed in either chamber before the end of the 117th Congress in 2023.

In July 2022, the Forest Service announced that it would begin undertaking "emergency fuels reduction treatments to provide for the long term survival of giant sequoia groves against immediate wildfire threats" by removing vegetation and duff on the surface, thinning areas of the forest, and implementing prescribed burns. The announcement stated that the work would encompass 13,377 acres (5,413 ha) in and around 12 giant sequoia groves in Sequoia and Sierra National Forests, with the intent to complete the work by 2023 at a cost of $15 million in funds from the Infrastructure Investment and Jobs Act and a further $6 million then still unappropriated. In October 2022, the National Park Service separately announced its own emergency actions to protect 11 at-risk and remote giant sequoia groves in Sequoia and Kings Canyon parks by manually thinning vegetation around the trees, burning piles of potential fuels, and using prescribed fire in the thinned areas. In February 2023, the Park Service began seeking public feedback on replanting sequoia and conifer seedlings in several groves particularly affected by the KNP and SQF Complex fires.

=== List of groves impacted ===
Below is a summary of the groves that the KNP Complex impacted, the dates those groves burned, the acreage and percentage of each that burned at high severity, and a brief narrative. All information is taken from the National Park Service's report on giant sequoia mortality following the 2021 fire season. Redwood Mountain Grove, Atwell Grove, and Suwanee Grove saw the most acreage burned at high severity.

List of giant sequoia groves burned
Name	Date(s) impacted	Acreage burned at high severity	% grove burned at high severity	Comments
Oriole Lake Grove	Sep 16 – Sep 26	0.4 acres (0 ha)	0%	The fire slowly backed and flanked southeast into Oriole Lake Grove from Paradise Mountain ridge to the southeast, taking 10 days to move into higher elevations of the grove.
Suwanee Grove	Sep 17	17.5 acres (7 ha)	26%	The entirety of Suwanee Grove burned in a single "extreme head fire run" when the northern portion of the complex (formerly the Colony Fire) swept up the Marble Fork Kaweah River drainage. Most of the grove burned at moderate-to-high severity.
Giant Forest	Sep 17 – Oct 18	3.7 acres (1 ha)	0%	The fire entered western portions of the Giant Forest grove on September 17, and crossed the Generals Highway the following day. As the fire flanked through the grove, firefighter hotshot crews conducted low-intensity burnout operations to prevent any high-severity fire from entering the grove. These operations continued through late October. The bases of two of the Four Guardsmen trees were burned. The chief of resources management and science for SEKI characterized the fire's behavior in the Giant Forest as "mainly quite good", with beneficial effects.
Squirrel Creek Grove	Sep 18	0 acres (0 ha)	0%	The fire backed into this very small grove near the Oriole Lake Crossing.
Douglass Grove	Sep 22 – Sep 23	0 acres (0 ha)	0%	This very small grove burned in a head fire.
Redwood Creek Grove	Sep 22 – Oct 2	1.6 acres (1 ha)	3%	The fire backed through this grove from Conifer Ridge.
New Oriole Lake Grove	Sep 24 – Sep 25	3.1 acres (1 ha)	21%	The fire moved up into New Oriole Lake Grove from the Oriole Lake area, largely in a single push.
Skagway Grove	Sep 24 – Sep 29	1.3 acres (1 ha)	2%	The fire backed down through Skagway Grove from Pine Ridge.
Muir Grove	Sep 25 – Oct 5	6.8 acres (3 ha)	3%	After firefighters conducted burnout operations in Muir Grove on September 25, the fire entered the grove burning up-slope on September 30 and October 1. A special fire retardant gel was applied aerially to trees on the grove's borders.
Pine Ridge Grove	Sep 26 – Sep 30	0 acres (0 ha)	0%	Fire backing down from Pine Ridge moved through the grove, largely at low severity, but with some areas of moderate severity.
Castle Creek Grove	Sep 26 – Oct 2	2.4 acres (1 ha)	1%	The fire flanked east through portions of the grove between September 26 and September 29. On September 30, the fire advanced to the east below the grove and burned pockets of sequoias on the grove's lower-elevation edges, before a more sustained push upslope through the grove (with an associated convective column) on October 1.
Atwell Grove	Sep 30 – Oct 18	18.9 acres (8 ha)	2%	The fire first entered Atwell Grove from the west on September 30, which was followed by a more intense push from the west, originating in the Redwood Creek area, on October 1. After continuing to flank through the grove, the fire made a large high-severity upslope run into the center of the grove on October 5. Further minor spread occurred, with one final large run on October 18.
Big Springs Grove	Oct 2 – Oct 3	0 acres (0 ha)	0%	The fire moved through the entirety of this very small grove over two days.
Redwood Mountain Grove	Oct 4 – Oct 9	560.6 acres (227 ha)	21%	One finger of the fire ran across and down from Redwood Mountain ridge into Redwood Canyon, merging with another finger of the fire north of Big Springs Grove. The run burned lower elevations of the grove at high severity. The fire then ran to the north, crossing the Generals Highway, and then backed westwards through the remaining parts of the grove.
Lost Grove	Oct 4 – Oct 5	0 acres (0 ha)	0%	A low-intensity burnout operation was conducted in the grove on October 4, and a head fire run the following day barely missed the grove.
East Fork Grove	Oct 8 – Oct 18	0 acres (0 ha)	0%	A portion of the grove (on the northern side of the East Fork Kaweah River) burned over the course of three days (October 8, 9, and 18).

== Effects ==
On October 7, a falling tree struck four personnel (affiliated with Cal Fire and the California Conservation Corps). All four were transported via helicopter to nearby hospitals with serious injuries, but were listed as stable by that night and released from the hospital the following morning. On October 11, another firefighter was struck by a falling rock while working in Atwell Grove. They were hospitalized but were expected to recover.

On October 22, Gavin Newsom, the governor of California, declared a state of emergency in Tulare County and multiple other counties affected by the season's fires, allowing residents to access resources through the California Disaster Assistance Act. At least 659 people were displaced by evacuation orders during the fire's active period in early October.

The Giant Forest, which closed in mid-September, reopened first on a limited basis in December 2021 and then fully on March 11, 2022. The stretch of the Generals Highway between Sequoia and Kings Canyon reopened on March 18, 2022, though mudslides re-closed parts of it in the fall of 2022. During winter storms in early 2023, fire-weakened hillsides contributed to washouts and damaged culverts, again causing multiple closures along the highway.

=== Damage ===
The fire destroyed four structures and damaged one, according to Cal Fire. These included a number of historic buildings in Sequoia National Park. The Redwood Mountain Ranger Station (built in 1940), Moro Rock Comfort Station (built in 1934), and Barton's Log/Crose's Cabin, a downed hollow sequoia log converted into a cabin in the 1920s, all burned in the fire. Redwood Canyon Research Cabin and a private cabin at Oriole Lake were also destroyed. The fire destroyed radio transmission towers and other hardware on Eshom Point, damaged park communications equipment on Milk Ranch Peak, and damaged an electrical distribution line belonging to Southern California Edison.

No campgrounds, picnic areas, or administrative buildings in either park were directly impacted by the fire, but other park infrastructure was affected. For example, 62.3 miles (100 km) of trail within the fire's perimeter suffered varying degrees of damage. Sequoia National Park contained 44.2 miles (71 km) of the total and Kings Canyon National Park the remaining 18.1 miles (29 km). Nine miles (14 km), representing 20 percent of Sequoia National Park's burned trails, and 7.4 miles (12 km), representing 40 percent of the burned trails in Kings Canyon National Park, were within moderate or high burn severity areas. An additional 6.1 miles (10 km) of trails were used as containment lines along the fire's perimeter, and did not wholly burn. Other impacts included damage to signage throughout the park, including road reflectors, speed limit signs, and posts, and nearly 20,000 potentially hazardous burned trees along roads in the parks.

=== Environmental impacts ===
In addition to giant sequoia mortality, the Burned Area Emergency Response (BAER) team evaluated a host of other environmental impacts from the fire. The KNP Complex Fire burned critical habitat for the Pacific fisher, a small carnivorous mammal whose southern Sierra Nevada population is listed as endangered under the Endangered Species Act of 1973. One of the primary reasons for the species' listing is the loss and fragmentation of its habitat due to high-severity wildfire. More than 27,000 acres (10,927 ha) of proposed critical fisher habitat burned in the fire, 58 percent of it at moderate to high severities. More than 60,000 acres (24,281 ha) of spotted owl habitat (much of it overlapping with fisher habitat) also burned, 46 percent of it at moderate to high severities.

The BAER team also evaluated soil burn severity using satellite imagery and field observations for calibration. A qualitative metric based on the amount of remaining surface material, soil stability, and soil hydrophobicity, soil burn severity influences post-fire runoff and debris flow issues. The KNP Complex Fire's overall footprint was calculated to contain 12.4 percent unburned, 48.8 percent low, and 38.8 percent moderate-to-high soil burn severity.

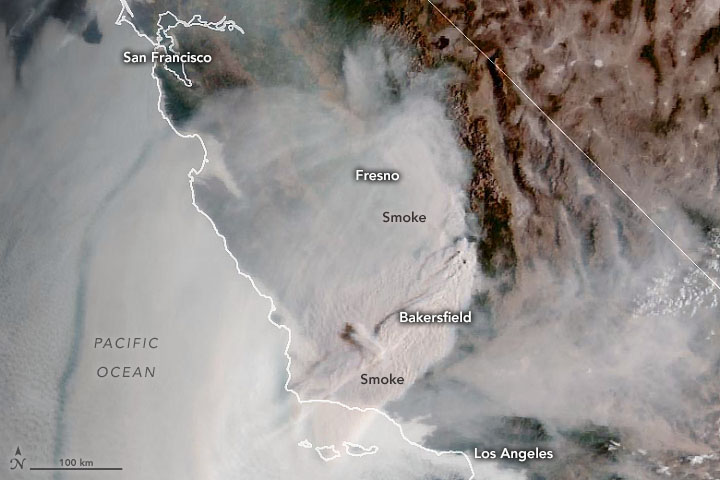
The KNP Complex and Windy fires inundated Southern California with smoke on September 24, 2021, as seen by NOAA's GOES-17 satellite

The KNP Complex Fire and the Windy Fire's smoke output created hazardous air quality conditions in the San Joaquin Valley, including the city of Fresno, between late September and early October. On September 27, the air quality index in Three Rivers near the KNP Complex Fire soared to 350 (the second-highest reading in the country that day after Kernville, which was inundated by smoke from the Windy Fire) and the South Coast Air Quality Management District issued a special air quality advisory for parts of the San Gabriel and San Bernardino mountains. When winds pushed smoke further south into the Los Angeles basin, many people called 911, and firefighters responded to multiple reports of drift smoke in the Angeles National Forest as skies turned hazy shades of brown and orange.

== Fire growth and containment ==
The table below shows how the fire grew in size and in containment during September and October 2021. Acreage reflects, where possible, the figure reported in the daily morning update following overnight aerial infrared mapping of the fire. The graph runs from September 10, the day the fires were discovered, until October 21, the last day where fire growth was reported (though the fire was not declared completely contained until nearly two months later).

Fire containment status Gray: contained; Red: active; %: percent contained
Date	Area burned (Note: Reported acreage decreased by 1 acre between October 11 and October 12; this is not a typo.)	Personnel	Containment
Sep 10	4.25 acres (2 ha)	...	
Sep 11	104 acres (42 ha)	...	
Sep 12	350 acres (142 ha)	...	
Sep 13	1,037 acres (420 ha)	130 personnel	
Sep 14	3,024 acres (1,224 ha)	...	
Sep 15	7,039 acres (2,849 ha)	...	
Sep 16	9,365 acres (3,790 ha)	482 personnel	
Sep 17	11,365 acres (4,599 ha)	416 personnel	
Sep 18	17,857 acres (7,226 ha)	416 personnel	
Sep 19	21,777 acres (8,813 ha)	614 personnel	
Sep 20	23,743 acres (9,608 ha)	810 personnel	
Sep 21	25,147 acres (10,177 ha)	965 personnel	
Sep 22	28,328 acres (11,464 ha)	1,412 personnel	
Sep 23	33,046 acres (13,373 ha)	1,518 personnel	
Sep 24	36,850 acres (14,913 ha)	1,620 personnel	
Sep 25	42,048 acres (17,016 ha)	1,729 personnel	
Sep 26	44,828 acres (18,141 ha)	1,780 personnel	
Sep 27	46,976 acres (19,011 ha)	1,804 personnel	
Sep 28	48,344 acres (19,564 ha)	1,822 personnel	
Sep 29	48,872 acres (19,778 ha)	1,802 personnel	
Sep 30	49,349 acres (19,971 ha)	1,949 personnel	
Oct 1	51,596 acres (20,880 ha)	1,494 personnel	
Oct 2	58,283 acres (23,586 ha)	1,345 personnel	
Oct 3	62,761 acres (25,398 ha)	1,357 personnel	
Oct 4	67,708 acres (27,400 ha)	1,357 personnel	
Oct 5	79,382 acres (32,125 ha)	1,566 personnel	
Oct 6	84,166 acres (34,061 ha)	1,866 personnel	
Oct 7	85,952 acres (34,784 ha)	1,951 personnel	
Oct 8	85,952 acres (34,784 ha)	2,069 personnel	
Oct 9	87,145 acres (35,266 ha)	1,972 personnel	
Oct 10	87,145 acres (35,266 ha)	1,935 personnel	
Oct 11	87,468 acres (35,397 ha)	2,118 personnel	
Oct 12	87,467 acres (35,397 ha)	2,083 personnel	
Oct 13	87,786 acres (35,526 ha)	2,019 personnel	
Oct 14	87,786 acres (35,526 ha)	1,588 personnel	
Oct 15	87,786 acres (35,526 ha)	1,460 personnel	
Oct 16	87,850 acres (35,552 ha)	780 personnel	
Oct 17	87,890 acres (35,568 ha)	747 personnel	
Oct 18	88,068 acres (35,640 ha)	657 personnel	
Oct 19	88,184 acres (35,687 ha)	695 personnel	
Oct 20	88,278 acres (35,725 ha)	671 personnel	
Oct 21	88,307 acres (35,737 ha)	567 personnel	
...	...	...	
Dec 16	88,307 acres (35,737 ha)	...	

== See also ==
- Glossary of wildfire terms
- Rough Fire (2015) – Killed giant sequoias in General Grant Grove
- Pier Fire (2017) – Killed giant sequoias in Black Mountain Grove
- Railroad Fire (2017) – Killed giant sequoias in Nelder Grove
- Washburn Fire (2022) – Threatened giant sequoias in Mariposa Grove
