= Belknap Complex =

Giant sequoia grove in Tulare County, California, United States

- Location within California

Geography
- Location: Tulare County, California, United States
- Coordinates: 36°08′07″N 118°35′05″W

Ecology
- Dominant tree species: Sequoiadendron giganteum

The Belknap Complex, sometimes referred to as Belknap Grove, is a complex of three giant sequoia groves located in the Tule River watershed of Giant Sequoia National Monument, just south of Camp Nelson, California. It is formed from the larger McIntyre Grove and Wheel Meadow Grove, and the smaller Carr Wilson Grove. The grove is home to a rich collection of old-growth giant sequoias spread out over 4,666 acres (18.88 km^{2}). The grove is fairly easy to reach by car given its close proximity to Highway 190. Forest Trail 31E30 meanders through the heart of the complex.

During the Castle Fire of 2020, approximately 59% of the Belknap Complex was subject to high-intensity fire, which is estimated to kill between 75 and 100% of the giant sequoia in its path.

== Noteworthy trees ==
Some trees of special note found within the complex included:

- The Patriarch Tree was the largest tree in the grove with a volume of 30,020 cubic feet (850 m^{3}). The tree was unusually short for a giant sequoia but had a trunk with a diameter of 72.6 feet (22.1 m). The Patriarch Tree was destroyed in the Castle Fire.
- Near Gutless Tree: Second largest tree in grove with a volume of 26,737 cubic feet (757.1 m^{3}).
- Gutless Goliath: Remnants of a once larger tree, but still 26,564 cubic feet (752.2 m^{3}) in volume.
- The Kathryn Tree: a giant sequoia tree with exceptionally large limbs.

== See also ==
- List of giant sequoia groves
- List of largest giant sequoias
