= SQF Complex =

2020 wildfire in Central California

SQF Complex fire
- Part of the August 2020 California lightning siege
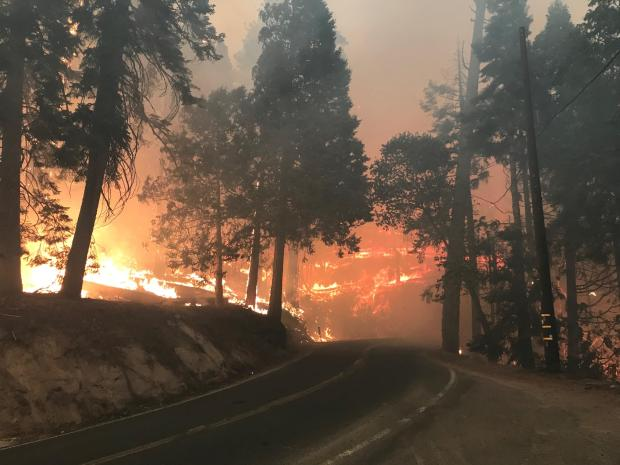
- Fire near Cedar Slope on September 15, 2020
- Date: August 19, 2020 –; January 6, 2021
- Location: Tulare County, California, United States
- Coordinates: 36.255°N 118.497°W

Statistics
- Total fires: 2
- Total area: 174,178 acres (70,487 ha)

Impacts
- Deaths: 0
- Injuries: 17
- Evacuated: >3,000
- Structures destroyed: 228
- Cost: $122.3 million

Ignition
- Cause: Lightning

Map
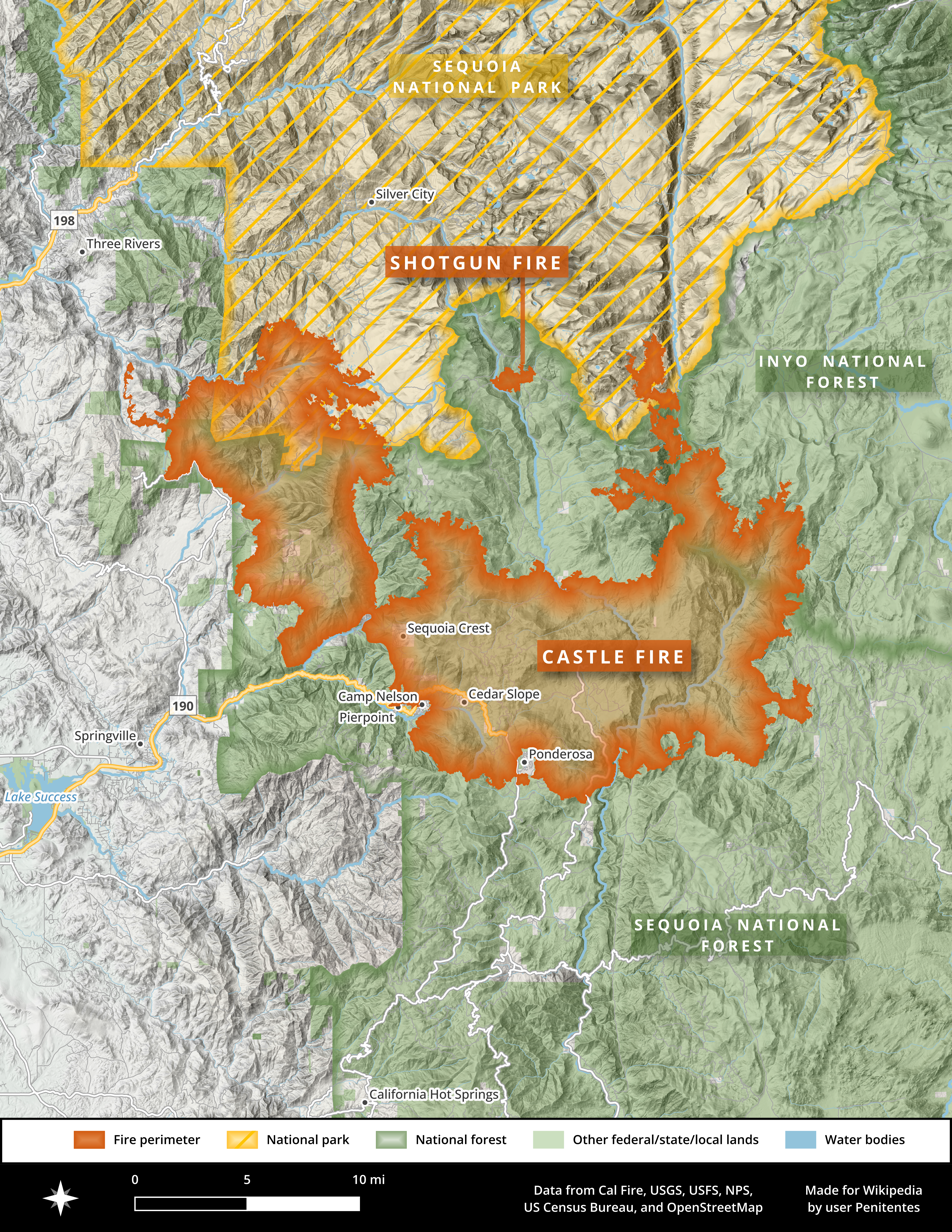
- A map of the extent of the SQF Complex

- Location in California

The SQF Complex fire—also called the SQF Lightning Complex—was a wildfire complex that burned in Tulare County in Central California in 2020. Comprising the Castle and Shotgun fires, it affected Sequoia National Forest and adjacent areas. Both fires began on August 19, 2020, and burned a combined total of 175,019 acres (70,828 hectares) before the complex as a whole was declared 100 percent contained on January 6, 2021. In the course of the fires, 232 structures were destroyed. There were no fatalities.

The Castle and Shotgun fires were both begun by lightning, part of a 'siege' of hundreds of wildfires caused by dry thunderstorms across California in mid-August 2020. The lightning siege contributed to California's largest wildfire season, by burned acreage, ever recorded. The Castle Fire is notable for its devastating effects on native sequoia (Sequoiadendron giganteum) groves in the southern Sierra Nevada. It is estimated to have caused the death of 10–14 percent of the native large sequoia population there. While the SQF Complex consisted of the two fires together, the Castle Fire was responsible for nearly all of the burned acreage.

== Progression ==
=== August ===
Both fires began in the morning hours of August 19. The Castle Fire was discovered that same day in the Golden Trout Wilderness by a spotter plane. On August 20, six handcrews totaling 120 personnel were dispatched to the fire. The Shotgun Fire was discovered on August 21 at the confluence of Pistol and Shotgun creeks by aircraft fighting the Castle Fire. On August 23, the Castle Fire crossed the Little Kern River, its burned area increasing from 400 acres (160 ha) to roughly 4,000 acres (1,600 ha).

For several weeks, the Castle Fire was not considered a major threat to Sequoia National Park or its giant sequoias.

=== September ===
On September 12, low relative humidity levels and strong southeast winds combined to drive the fire to more than 74,000 acres (30,000 ha), and it crossed the North Fork of the Middle Fork of the Tule River on the morning of September 13. The 60-mile-per-hour (97 km/h) winds pushed the fire through the 530-acre (210 ha) privately owned Alder Creek Grove of giant sequoias, killing an estimated 80 or more trees.

The number of resources on the fire peaked in late September, with more than 160 fire engines assigned and more than 40 bulldozers.

=== October onwards ===
The SQF Complex was declared 100 percent contained on January 6, 2021. The total cost of the fire suppression effort reached $122.3 million.

A giant sequoia was found still smoldering in Board Camp Grove in May of 2022, and another tree was observed by a helicopter smoldering in the Belknap Complex in July of 2022.

== Effects ==
=== Damage ===
The small community of Cedar Slope was largely destroyed by the fire with 57 of its 65 cabins completely burned. In the nearby communities of Alpine Village and Sequoia Crest, 37 and 49 cabins were lost in the fire respectively. No structure damage was reported in nearby Camp Nelson or Ponderosa. The area remains at risk for mud flows and flash floods due to the charred soil being unable to absorb water.

=== Closures and evacuations ===
As a result of the fire, parts of Route 190 and Route 198 were closed, Sequoia National Park was closed for two weeks and parts of Three Rivers were under mandatory evacuation orders. By mid-September, more than 3,000 people had been forced to evacuate their homes.

=== Giant sequoias ===
The Castle fire swept through portions of 22 named giant sequoia groves of the roughly 75 groves scattered along the Sierra Nevada. Some of the most heavily impacted groves included Freeman Creek Grove and the three groves of the Belknap Complex: McIntyre Grove, Wheel Meadow Grove, and the Carr Wilson/Bear Creek Grove. Initially, researchers estimated that hundreds of giant sequoias had been killed, but the toll was only revised upward. A 2021 report led by National Park Service scientists concluded that over 7,500–10,600 mature trees, 10–14 percent of the species' population, had likely been lost in the fire. Near Sequoia Crest, one-third of the Alder Creek Grove of Giant Sequoia is reported as severely damaged. The large Stagg Tree in Alder Creek Grove was not impacted. Other areas experienced "light fire" which is expected to be ecologically beneficial in the long run. The Homers Nose Grove was also reported as "badly burned". In virtually every grove affected, extensive Giant Sequoia regeneration thrived especially in places where the fire was severely hot and had killed the most trees.

== See also ==
- Rough Fire – 2015 wildfire in Fresno County that killed giant sequoia trees
- Railroad Fire – 2017 wildfire in Mariposa and Madera counties that killed giant sequoia trees
- Pier Fire – 2017 wildfire in Tulare County that killed giant sequoia trees
- KNP Complex Fire – 2021 wildfire in Tulare County that killed giant sequoia trees
- Windy Fire – 2021 wildfire in Tulare County that killed giant sequoia trees
