= Evans Grove Complex =

Seven sequoia groves California, US

- Location within California

Geography
- Location: Fresno County, California, United States
- Coordinates: 36°46′26″N 118°49′09″W

Ecology
- Dominant tree species: Sequoiadendron giganteum

The Evans Grove Complex is a complex of seven giant sequoia groves located in the Kings River watershed on the southern slopes of Kings Canyon in Giant Sequoia National Monument (Sequoia National Forest). It is formed from the Evans, Lockwood, Little Boulder, Boulder, Kennedy, Windy Gulch, and Horseshoe Bend groves. The complex is home to a rich collection of old-growth giant sequoias covering a combined 2,270 acres (9.2 km^{2}).

== History ==
Evans Grove Complex derives its name from Evans Grove, the largest constituent grove, which itself is named after John Evans, who lived nearby and protected the trees from fire.

The complex and its surroundings were heavily impacted by the Rough Fire in 2015 and have since been closed by the Sequoia National Forest However it is open as of 2024

== Noteworthy trees ==
Some trees of special note found within the complex include:

- Ishi Giant—an old, fire-scarred giant sequoia with few visitors and was the 14th tallest giant sequoia in the world. In 2015, the tree lost significant trunk volume, over 27 ft (8.2 m) in height, and over half of its crown during the Rough Fire. A new volume and height estimate is needed to determine its size.
- Evans Tree—a giant sequoia that was measured in 1981, and had a volume of 30,232 cubic feet (856.1 m^{3}).

== See also ==
- List of giant sequoia groves
- List of largest giant sequoias
