= Placer County Big Trees Grove =

Giant sequoia grove in California

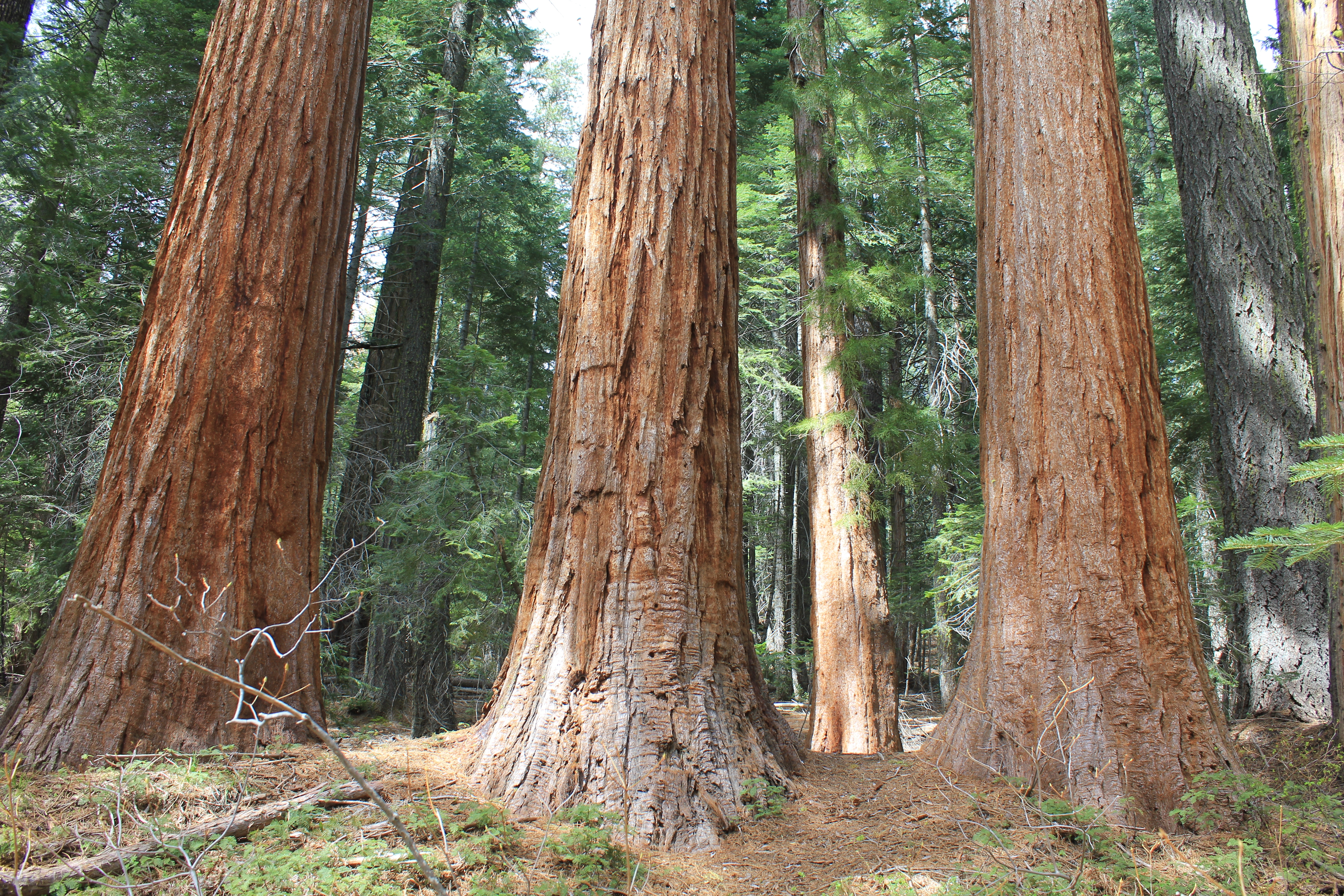
- Four of the six living giant sequoias at Placer County Big Trees Grove

- Location within California

Geography
- Location: Placer County, California, United States
- Coordinates: 39°03′30″N 120°34′30″W
- Elevation: 5,600 ft (1,700 m)

Ecology
- Dominant tree species: Sequoiadendron giganteum

Placer County Big Trees Grove is a small, isolated giant sequoia grove located along Mosquito Ridge Road in the American River watershed of Tahoe National Forest, California. It is known for being the northernmost and furthest removed of all giant sequoia groves.

The grove contains six old-growth giant sequoias, two of which are of considerable size. The trees occupy a small, bowl-shaped depression with a small seasonal creek flowing through it. The grove itself has never been logged. Four of the six trees are named after World War I veterans.

== Noteworthy trees ==
- The Joffre Tree: the tallest and second largest tree of the grove.
- The Pershing Tree: the largest tree of the grove, featuring a diameter of 3.66 m (12.0 ft).

== See also ==
- List of giant sequoia groves
