= Milk Ranch Peak =

Mountain in California, United States

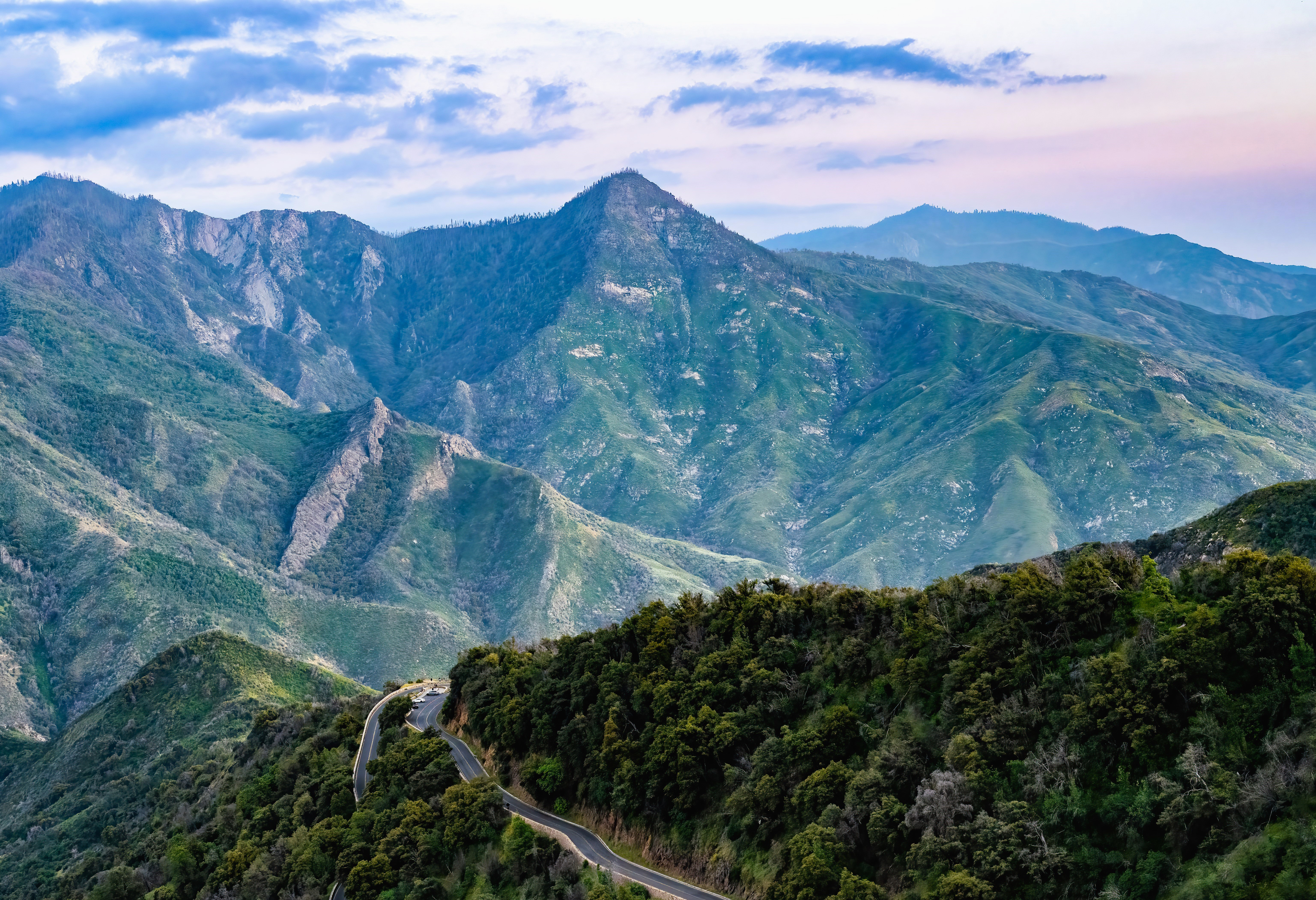
- North aspect

Highest point
- Elevation: 6,250 ft (1,905 m)
- Prominence: 430 ft (131 m)
- Parent peak: Paradise Peak (9,362 ft)
- Isolation: 3.88 mi (6.24 km)
- Coordinates: 36°29′00″N 118°46′51″W

Geography
- Location within California Location within the United States
- Country: United States
- State: California
- County: Tulare
- Protected area: Milk Ranch/Case Mountain WSA; Sequoia National Park
- Parent range: Sierra Nevada
- Topo map: USGS Case Mountain

Geology
- Rock age: Early Cretaceous
- Rock type: Granodiorite

Milk Ranch Peak is a 6,250-foot-elevation (1,905-meter) mountain summit in Tulare County, California, United States.

== Description ==
Milk Ranch Peak is situated in the Sierra Nevada mountain range along the boundary shared by Milk Ranch/Case Mountain Wilderness Study Area and Sequoia National Park. It is the highest point within the Milk Ranch/Case Mountain Wilderness Study Area. Precipitation runoff from the mountain drains into tributaries of the Kaweah River. Topographic relief is significant as the summit rises 4,450 feet (1,356 meters) above the river in two miles. Near the summit is the historic Milk Ranch Peak Fire Lookout. The lookout and communications equipment were damaged in 2021 by the Paradise Fire which combined with the Colony Fire to become the KNP Complex Fire. This mountain's toponym was officially adopted in 1946 by the United States Board on Geographic Names and the name refers to the "Milk Ranch" that was on the south slope one-half mile from the summit. The Milk Ranch cattle grazing grounds on the mountain ridge was used by the Lovelace and Works families during the mid-1800s.

== Climate ==
According to the Köppen climate classification system, Milk Ranch Peak is located in an alpine climate zone. Most weather fronts originate in the Pacific Ocean, and travel east toward the Sierra Nevada mountains. As fronts approach, they are forced upward by the peaks (orographic lift), causing them to drop their moisture in the form of rain or snowfall onto the range.

== See also ==
- List of mountain peaks of California
