= Freeman Creek Grove =

Giant sequoia grove in Tulare County, California, United States

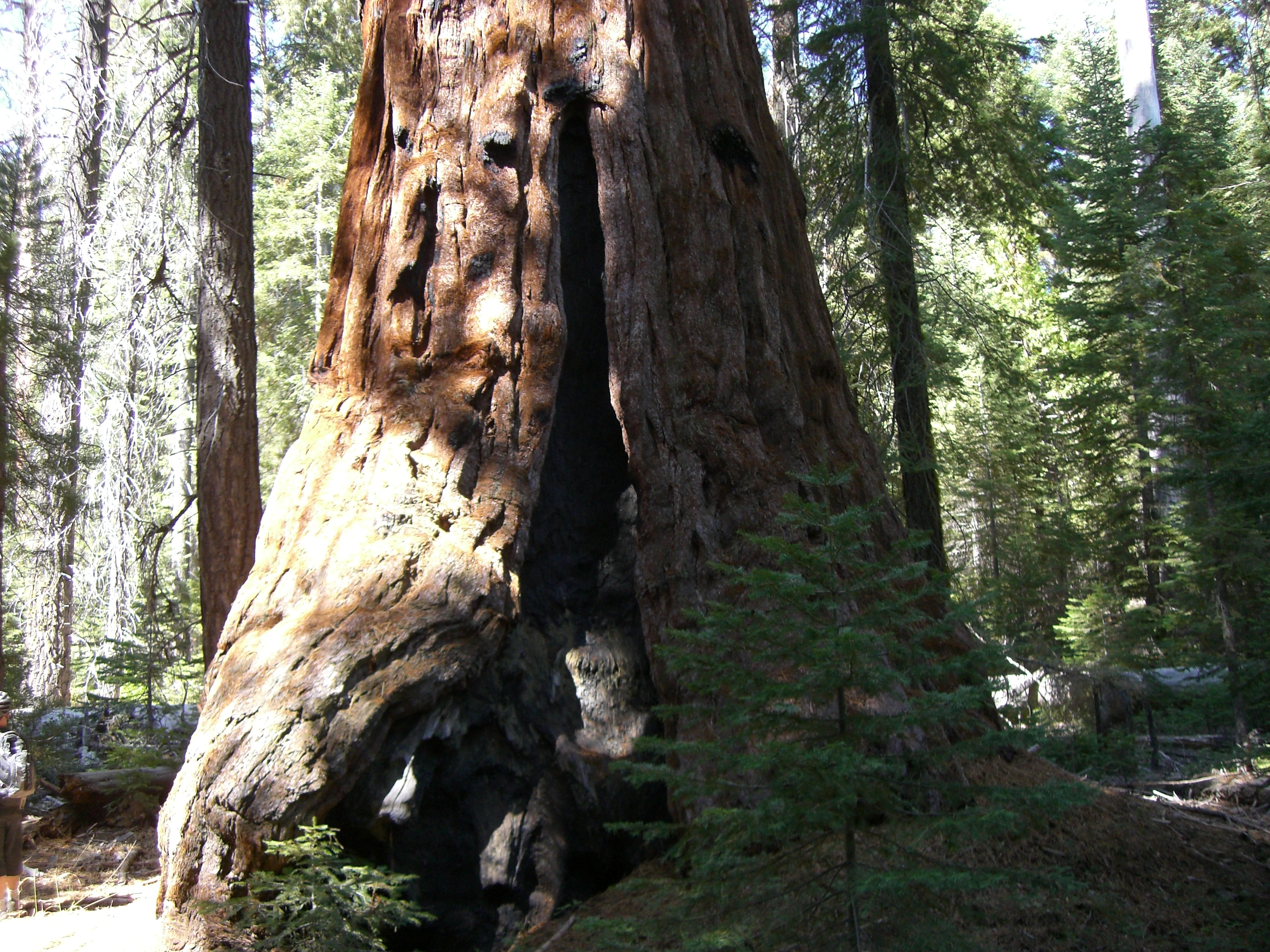
- The George H. W. Bush Tree

- Location within California

Geography
- Location: Tulare County, California, United States
- Coordinates: 36°08′22″N 118°30′33″W

Ecology
- Dominant tree species: Sequoiadendron giganteum

Freeman Creek Grove is a grove of giant sequoias located in Giant Sequoia National Monument in the Sierra Nevada in eastern California. The area is a botanical reserve under administration by the Sequoia National Forest, except for one small inholding. The largest unlogged grove outside of a national park, it covers about 1,425 acres (5.77 km^{2}) in the Freeman Creek Watershed, mainly south of Freeman Creek. Freeman Creek itself is a tributary of the Kern River.

== Noteworthy trees ==
There are several large sequoias in this grove, including:

- Great Goshawk Tree: The largest tree in the grove at 32,783 cubic feet (928.3 m^{3}). Named by Bill Croft in 1988, this is the 29th or 28th largest giant sequoia in the world. The exact location of the tree is not publicly known.
- President George H. W. Bush Tree: This tree was named to commemorate the Presidential Proclamation delivered and signed by President George H. W. Bush to protect, preserve and restore all of the sequoia groves on National Forest System lands throughout the Sierra Nevada. Bush delivered and signed the proclamation while standing beside the tree in 1992.
- Loren's Tree: This is one of the largest trees in the grove, with a volume somewhere between 28,000 and 30,000 cubic feet (850 m^{3}).
- Bannister's Tree: A remnant of a once larger tree, but still around 26,000 cubic feet (740 m^{3}).
- Castro Tree: A telescope giant sequoia.

== See also ==
- List of giant sequoia groves
- Evans Grove
