= Deer Creek (Tulare County, California) =

Deer Creek More's Creek
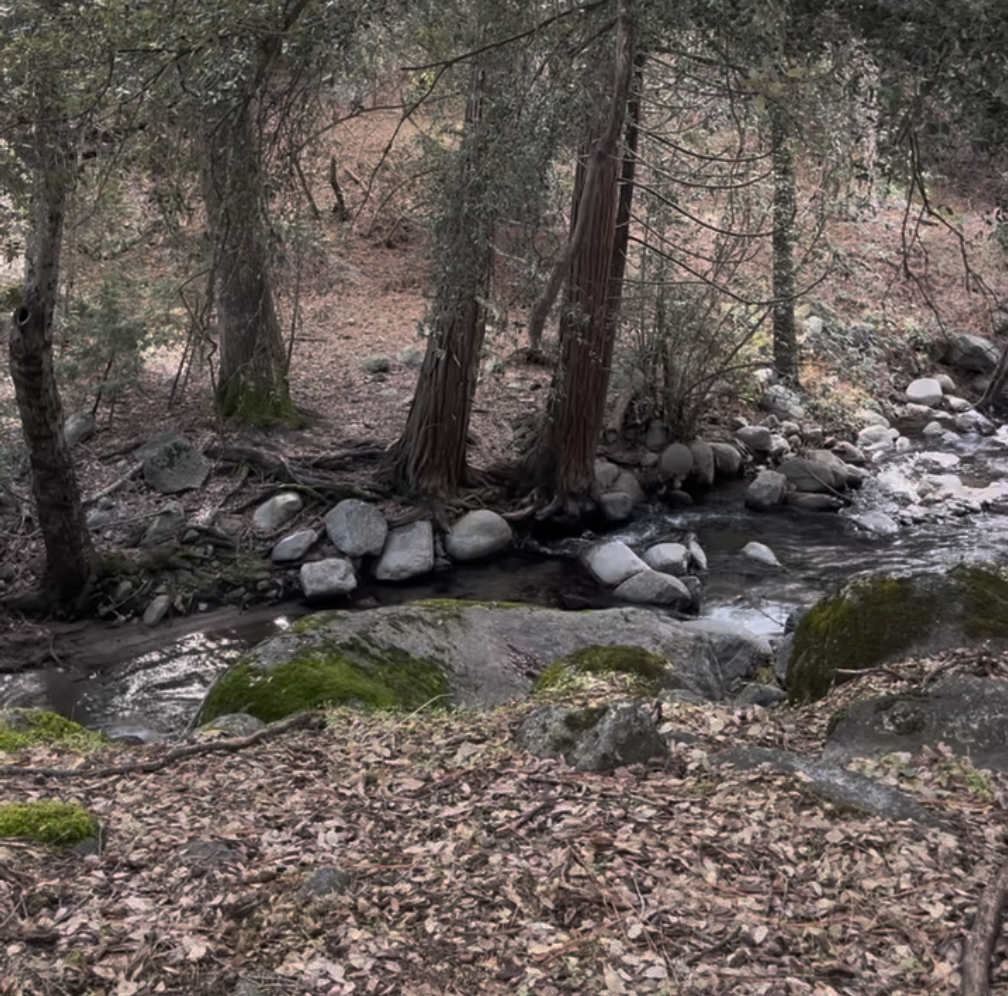
- A photo of Deer Creek in its course just outside of California Hot Springs, California (January 7th, 2025)

- Location of the mouth within California

Location
- Country: United States
- State: California
- Region: Tulare County

Physical characteristics
- Source: source
  - location: on the west slope of the Greenhorn Mountains, in the Sierra Nevada Mountain range, Tulare County
  - coordinates: 35°54′10″N 118°34′13″W
  - elevation: 7,560 ft (2,300 m)
- Mouth: mouth
  - location: terminates at the Lakeland and Homeland Canals in the San Joaquin Valley, Tulare County
  - coordinates: 35°56′05″N 119°28′23″W
  - elevation: 203 ft (62 m)

Deer Creek, formerly More's Creek, is a creek in Tulare County, California. Its source is on the west slope of the Greenhorn Mountains, in the Sierra Nevada Mountain range. From there Deer Creek runs west to terminate at the Lakeland and Homeland Canals in the San Joaquin Valley just east of the Tulare - Kings County border. Originally it ran into Tulare Lake before it was diverted for agriculture.
