= Camp Nelson, California =

- census-designated place
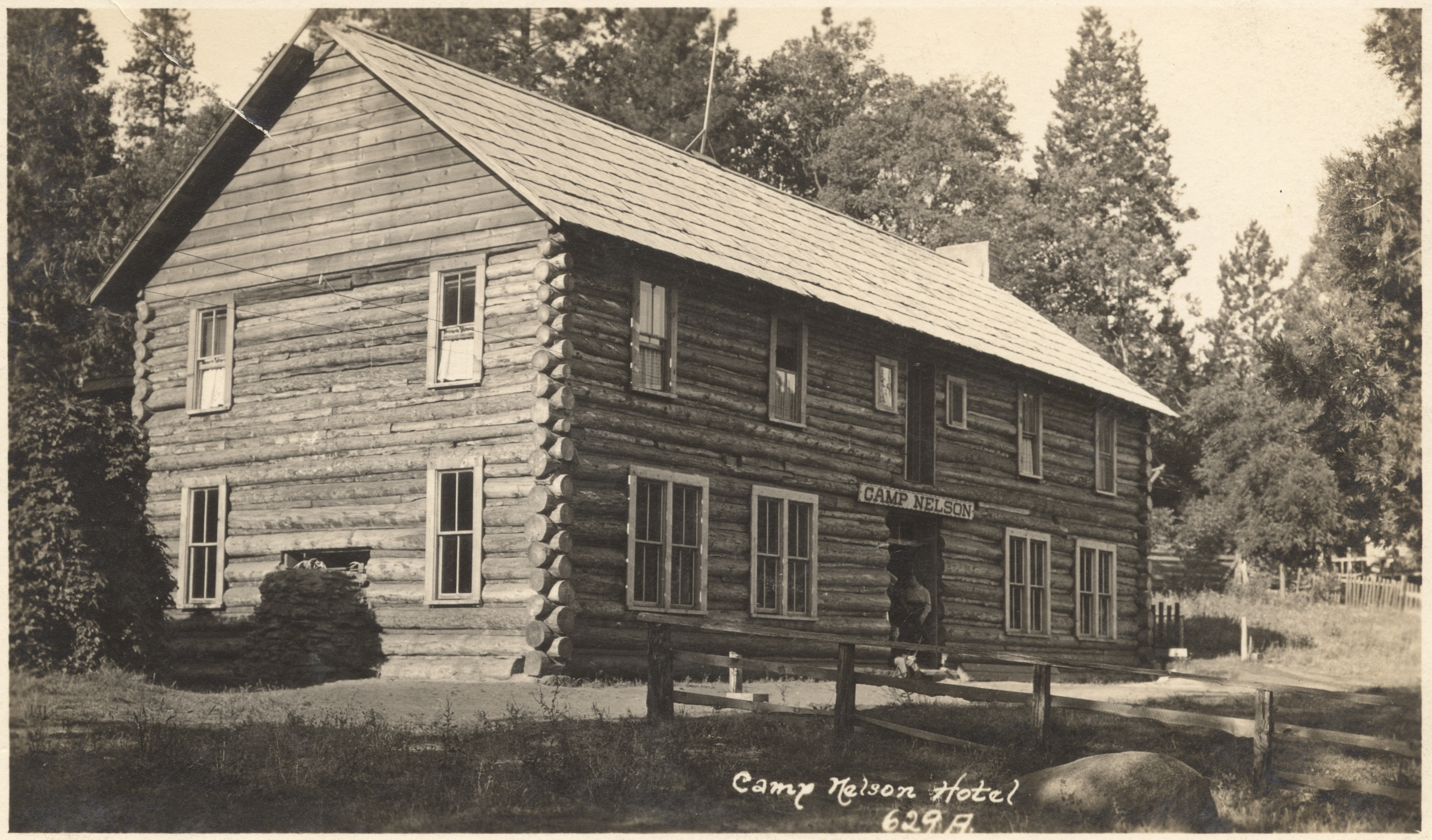
- Camp Nelson Hotel

- Location of Camp Nelson in Tulare County, California.

- Location within California Location within the United States
- Coordinates: 36°08′34″N 118°36′33″W
- Country: California
- County: Tulare

Area
  - Total: 1.24 sq mi (3.21 km^{2})
  - Land: 1.24 sq mi (3.21 km^{2})
  - Water: 0 sq mi (0.00 km^{2}) 0%
- Elevation: 4,898 ft (1,493 m)

Population (2020)
  - Total: 106
  - Density: 85.6/sq mi (33.05/km^{2})
- Time zone: UTC-8 (Pacific (PST))
  - Summer (DST): UTC-7 (PDT)
- ZIP code: 93265
- Area code: 559
- GNIS feature IDs: 1660426; 2585405

Camp Nelson is a census-designated place in Tulare County, California, United States. Camp Nelson is 12 miles (19 km) east of Springville. Camp Nelson has a post office with ZIP code 93208. The population was 109 at the 2020 census, up from 97 at the 2010 census. Camp Nelson can be reached from Porterville by 33 curvy miles on California State Route 190 with an elevation gain of 4,439 feet.

== Geography ==
According to the United States Census Bureau, the CDP covers an area of 1.2 square miles (3.2 km^{2}), all land.

=== Climate ===
This region experiences warm (but not hot) and dry summers, with no average monthly temperatures above 71.6 °F. According to the Köppen Climate Classification system, Camp Nelson has a warm-summer Mediterranean climate, abbreviated "Csb" on climate maps.

== Demographics ==
Historical population
Census	Pop.	Note	%±
2010	97		—
2020	106		9.3%
U.S. Decennial Census; 1850–1870 1880-1890; 1900 1910 1920; 1930 1940 1950; 1960 1970 1980; 1990 2000 2010

Camp Nelson first appeared as a census designated place in the 2010 U.S. census.

Annually, the town hosts the summer Mountain Festival in the Camp Nelson Meadow, which was established through the John M. Nelson conservancy. Apart from the annual festival, visitors come to Camp Nelson to see the grove of Sequoias near Belknap campground. A small tungsten mine operated in the area until the 1950s.

=== 2020 census ===
As of the 2020 census, Camp Nelson had a population of 106. The population density was 85.6 inhabitants per square mile (33.1/km^{2}). The entire population lived in rural areas.

The median age was 63.3 years. The age distribution was 4 people (3.8%) under the age of 18, 1 person (0.9%) aged 18 to 24, 14 people (13.2%) aged 25 to 44, 39 people (36.8%) aged 45 to 64, and 48 people (45.3%) who were 65 years of age or older. There were 46 males and 60 females; for every 100 females there were 76.7 males, and for every 100 females age 18 and over there were 72.9 males age 18 and over.

There were 69 households in Camp Nelson, of which 15.9% had children under the age of 18 living in them. Of all households, 44.9% were married-couple households, 5 (7.2%) were cohabiting couple households, 21.7% were households with a male householder and no spouse or partner present, and 26.1% were households with a female householder and no spouse or partner present. About 33.3% of all households were made up of individuals and 18.8% had someone living alone who was 65 years of age or older. The average household size was 1.54. There were 42 families (60.9% of all households).

There were 361 housing units at an average density of 291.6 units per square mile (112.6 units/km^{2}), of which 69 (19.1%) were occupied year round, all by homeowners, and 292 (80.9%) were used seasonally. The homeowner vacancy rate was 0.0% and the rental vacancy rate was 0.0%.

Racial composition as of the 2020 census
Race	Number	Percent
White	92	86.8%
Black or African American	0	0.0%
American Indian and Alaska Native	6	5.7%
Asian	3	2.8%
Native Hawaiian and Other Pacific Islander	0	0.0%
Some other race	3	2.8%
Two or more races	2	1.9%
Hispanic or Latino (of any race)	3	2.8%

== History ==
In 1886, John Nelson began to homestead land above Porterville that became Nelson’s Camp. This became a popular stopover spot for cattlemen, sheepmen, hunters, and fishermen. Nelson soon enlarged his house and remodeled it into a two-story hotel. Afterwards, a few cabins were added and the spot became known as Nelson’s Camp. John Nelson died August 3, 1909, aged 79. With his death, his daughter, Emma, and her husband took over the operation. In 1922, a road suitable for automobiles was completed to the camp. The camp was sold in 1937 and operated by different families over the years. Electricity reached Camp Nelson in 1951 and in the mid-1960’s, the road was upgraded to all year access. From 1976 to 1979, the Civil War Re-Enactment Society held Civil War skirmishes in Nelson Meadow with a "Blue and Grey" ball later at the Lodge.

After some complicated financial dealings, the property and business were sold to Jim and Bonnie Hood in June 1987. In a case that attracted national attention, Bonnie Hood was murdered August 19, 1990 as she slept at the lodge. Bruce Beauchamp, an employee of Jim Hood, was acquitted of her murder on March 29, 1991. Jim Hood later shot Beauchamp to death and he was convicted of that murder in a second trial.

Later, Jim Hood deeded the Lodge to his attorney, Philip Bourdette. Ron Peterson, who held the mortgage on the Lodge, foreclosed and won the proceedings. Ron Peterson sold the Lodge to Steven Huth and Mike Quatacker. The Lodge and motel were later sold to Len Aten. Aten held a few conferences and special events in the Lodge, but it was never open to the general public.

The John M Nelson Conservancy (a California non-profit public benefit corporation) was created in 1985 due to the breakup of the Camp Nelson Resort properties. The primary aim of the Conservancy was to acquire the six and a half acre Camp Nelson meadow. After raising $85,000 in public donations, the Conservancy acquired the meadow in December, 1997. Special events are held in the meadow from time to time.

In September, 2020, Camp Nelson was spared the destruction of other small communities in the area by the naturally sparked Sequoia Complex Fire (SQF Complex).

== Education ==
Camp Nelson is served by the Springville Union Elementary School District as well as by the Porterville Unified School District for secondary school.
