= Muir Grove =

Giant sequoia grove in Sequoia National Park, California, United States

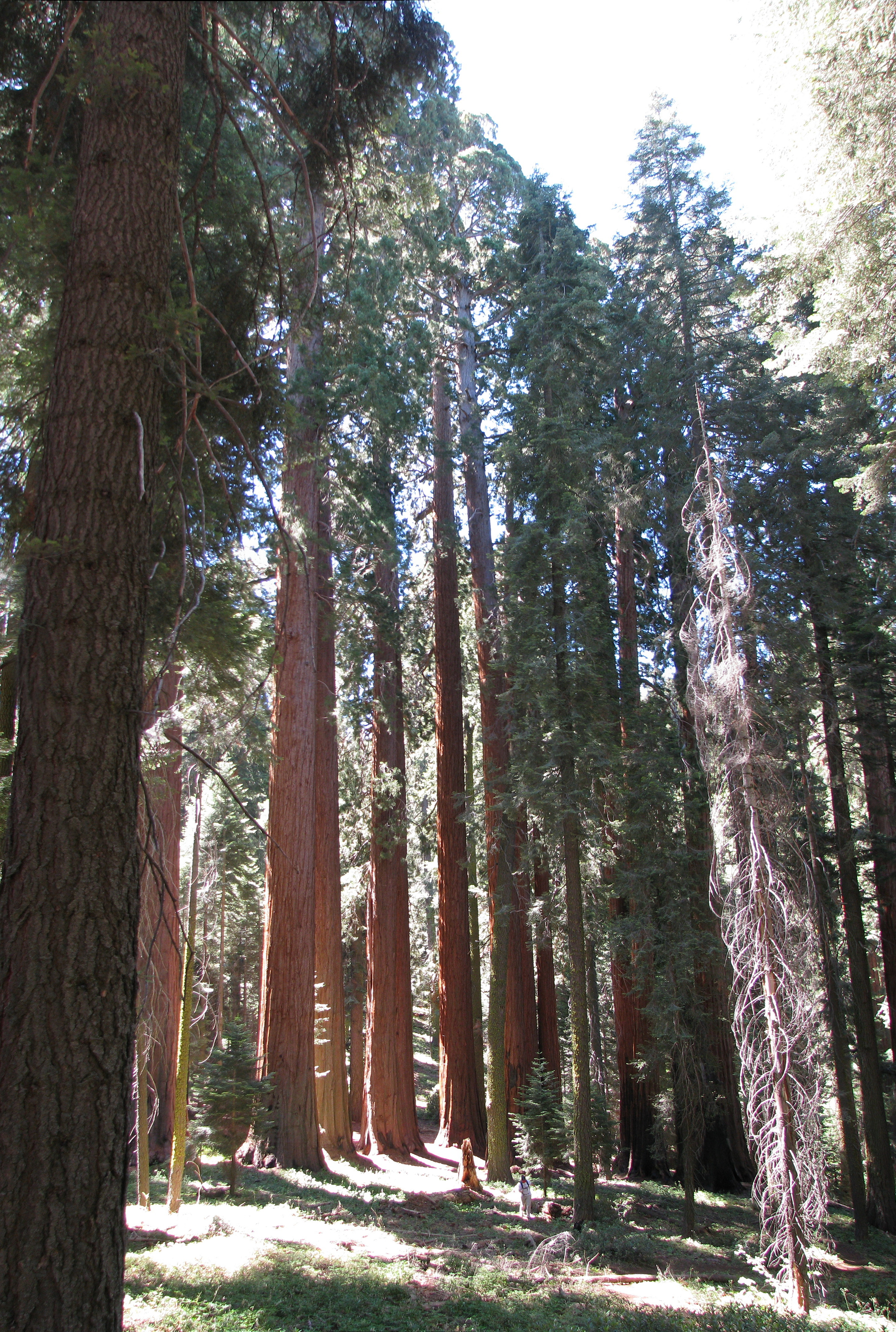
- Muir Grove

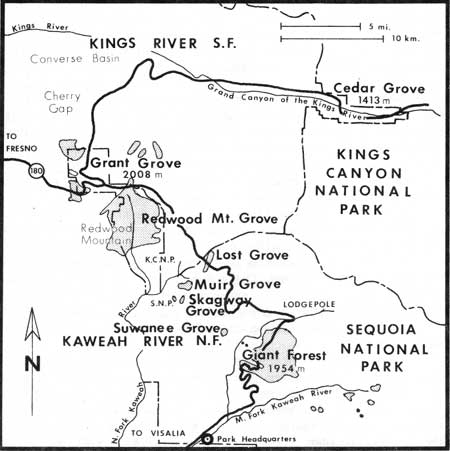
- Map of Muir Grove within Sequoia National Park

Geography
- Location: Sequoia National Park, California, United States
- Coordinates: 36°37′53″N 118°50′10″W
- Elevation: 6,293 ft (1,918 m)
- Area: 215 acres (0.87 km^{2})

Ecology
- Dominant tree species: Sequoiadendron giganteum

Muir Grove is a giant sequoia grove in Sequoia National Park of the Tulare County, which covers about 215 acres (0.87 km^{2}). The grove, located in the northwest corner of the park, is accessed by the Muir Grove Trail which begins from the Dorst Creek Campground. Because of its relatively remote location in the park, it is significantly less visited than the more popular groves of large sequoia trees in the park. The isolated atmosphere helps keep Muir Grove untouched and preserved.

== History and Origin ==
Muir Grove was named after the Scottish-American naturalist and author John Muir. His advocacy for the preservation of wilderness in the United States made him well known among environmentalists and politicians. His writing about nature and conservation efforts helped sway many public and political opinions. His attempts lead to the creation of Sequoia and General Grant National Parks.

== Vegetation ==
Muir Grove has a total of 629 coniferous trees that scatter the terrain. The giant sequoia reproduction is relatively slim compared to other groves in the California National Parks. The high relative density of mature trees compensates for the lack of young trees. There is an increased reduction of trees between one and five feet in diameter compared to other mature groves.

Abies concolor dominates the grove, with 523 trees (83% of the total). The next most important species in the moderate-elevation grove is Pinus lambertiana, with 71 trees (11% of the total). There are 33 specimens of the well-known Sequoiadendron giganteum (5% of the total). There also are Libocedrus decurrens (0.3% of the total), which grow on dry or rocky surfaces.

There are 56 different species present in the ground-covered vegetation. It's relatively moist, creating mesic conditions. There is only 16% land without vegetation in Muir Grove. Ground cover includes Chrysolepis sempervirens (covering 2.7% of the ground area), Corylus cornuta var. californica (2.4% of ground area), and Cornus nuttallii (0.2% of ground area).

== Muir Grove Trail ==
Muir Grove Trail is about a 4.2 mi hike, climbing 530 feet. Beginning from the Dorst Creek Campground, hikers can travel west for 1.9 miles, which leads to the edge of the old-growth sequoia grove. Few travelers take the time to walk this trail to witness the mammoth sequoias. Along the trail itself, there are almost no sequoias, but it has Sierra woodland scenery which people admire. There are two creeks, pinewoods, and other large trees that encompass the scenery. As hikers finally reach Muir Grove, the trail stops and the grove becomes a shallow saddle around the outskirts. There are abundant sequoias that scatter the grove making it an isolated domain.

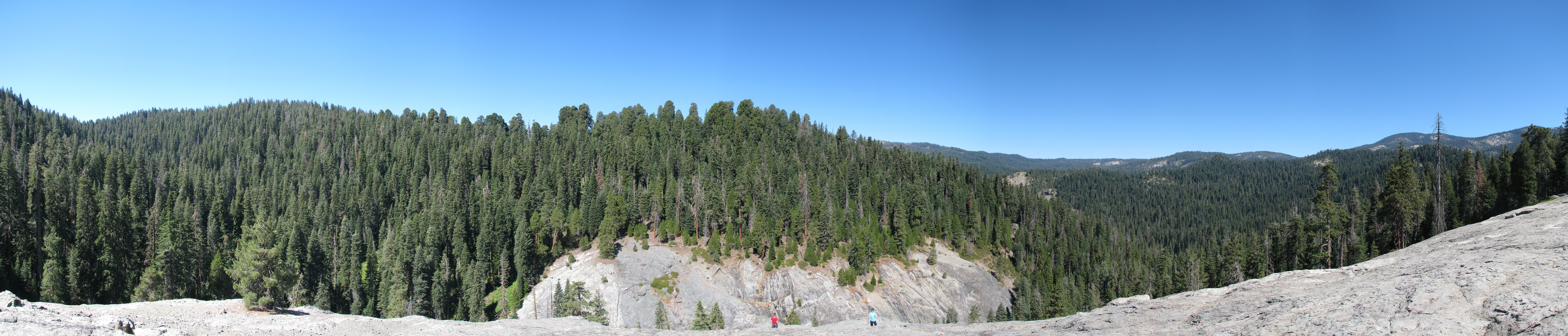
Panoramic View from Muir Grove Trail

== See also ==
- List of giant sequoia groves
