= Rough Fire =

2015 wildfire in Central California

- Part of the 2015 California wildfires
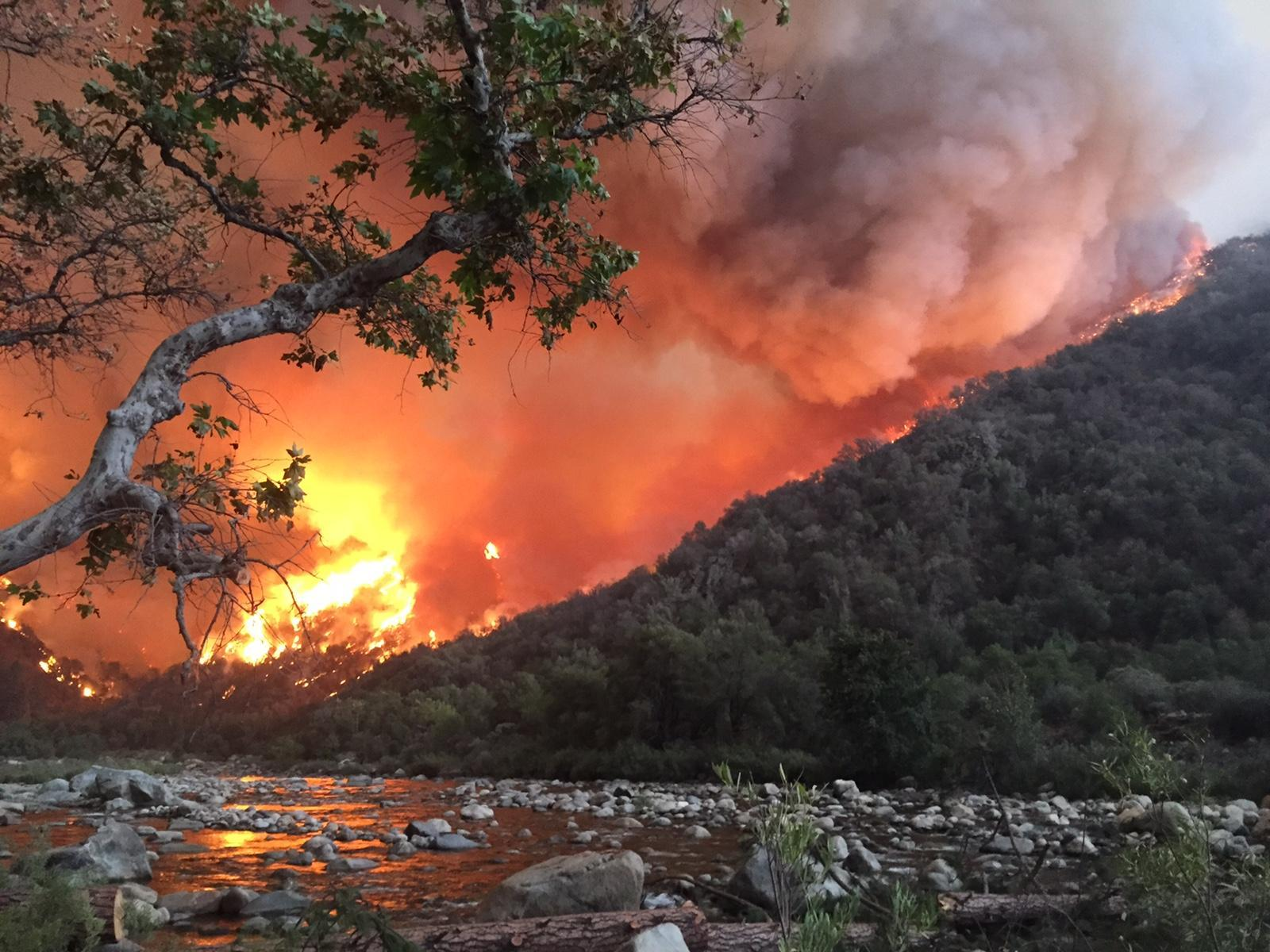
- The Rough Fire burning on a mountainside in September 2015
- Date: July 31 –; November 5, 2015; (98 days)
- Location: Fresno County, California, United States
- Coordinates: 36.874°N 118.905°W

Statistics
- Burned area: 151,623 acres (61,360 ha; 237 sq mi; 614 km^{2})

Impacts
- Deaths: 0
- Injuries: 12
- Evacuated: >2,500
- Structures destroyed: 4
- Cost: $120.9 million; (equivalent to about $155.9 million in 2024)

Ignition
- Cause: Lightning strike

Map
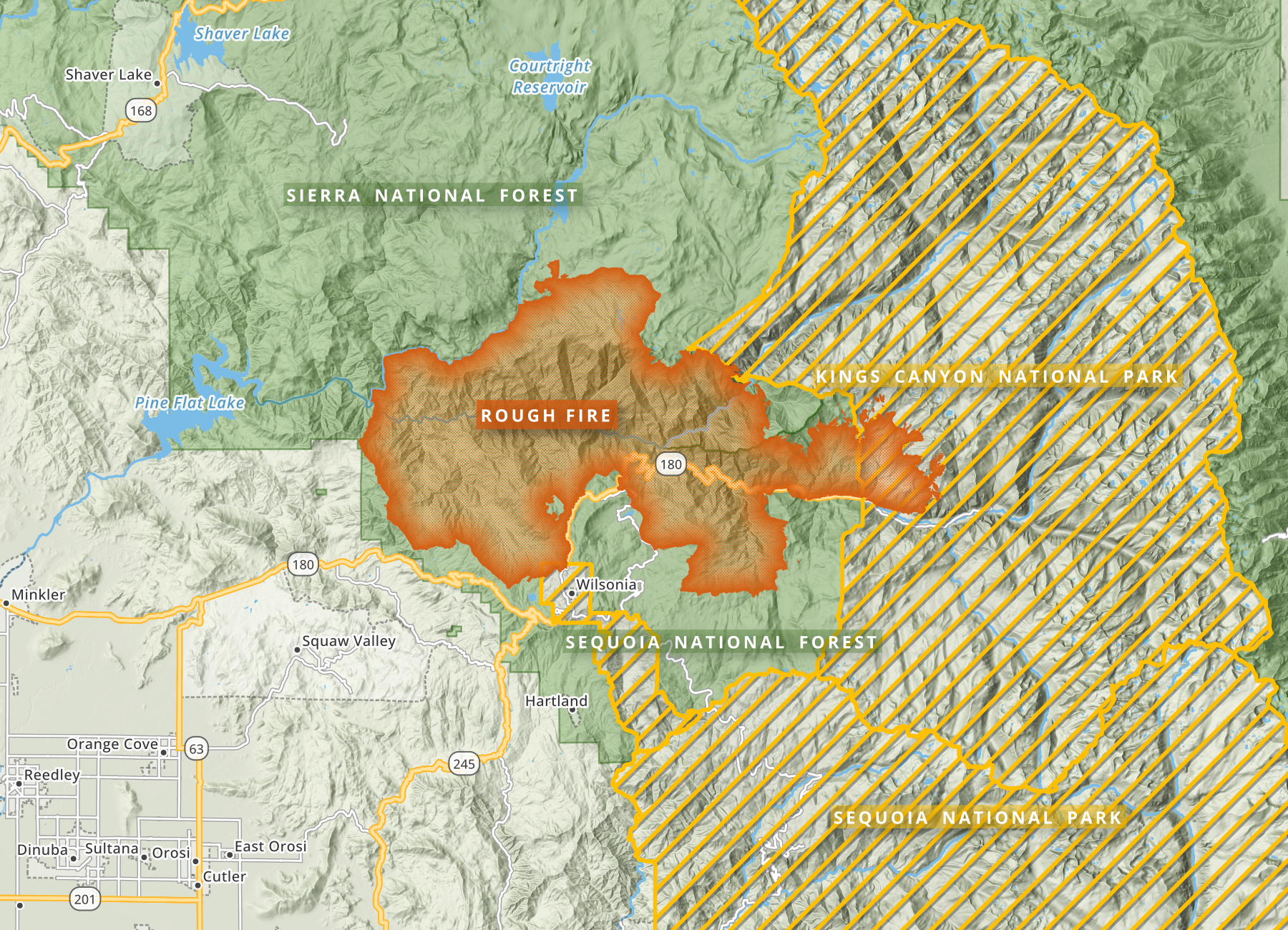
- The footprint of the Rough Fire, which largely remained in the Sierra National Forest and Sequoia National Forest

- The general location of the fire in Central California

The Rough Fire was a major wildfire in Fresno County, California, and the largest of the 2015 California wildfire season. The fire was ignited by a lightning strike on July 31 and burned 151,623 acres (61,360 ha), largely in the Sierra National Forest and the Sequoia National Forest, before it was declared contained on November 6, 2015. At the time it occurred, the fire was the thirteenth largest in recorded California history.

The Rough Fire destroyed four structures and caused zero fatalities. Twelve injuries were recorded among the firefighters that responded to the incident, who numbered more than 3,700 at peak staffing in mid-September. The effort to contain the fire cost an estimated $120 million.

== Background ==
A severe and multi-year drought worsened wildfire risk in California in 2015. The drought and ensuing bark beetle predation on weakened trees contributed to the accumulation of over ten million dead trees in the southern Sierra Nevada by the time of the fire. In addition to these factors, there was little prior fire history—natural or intentional burns—in the area, in some cases extending back 150 years.

== Progression ==
=== July 31–August 31 ===
The Rough Fire was begun by a lightning strike in the evening hours of Friday, July 31, 2015. The location of the fire's ignition was in the southern Sierra National Forest, partway up Deer Ridge between Rough Creek and Deer Creek in the upper drainage of the Kings River. It was first detected by the Buck Rock fire lookout in Sequoia National Forest to the south, and the location of the fire was triangulated with the help of several other lookouts. Lightning touched off several other fires in the region that night, but all were quickly contained.

The Rough Fire—dubbed as such for its initial proximity to Rough Creek, in typical wildfire naming fashion—owed its survival to its rugged and remote location; there were no roads or trails that ground crews could use to access the fire. The section of the Kings Canyon drainage in question contained slopes of eighty to ninety degrees, too steep for ground crews to work safely in. Forest Service experts considered the chances of quelling the fire with air power alone impracticable.

By August 6, a week after ignition, authorities reported the fire as having burned 500 acres (200 ha) with no containment. By Tuesday, August 11, it had grown to more than 5,000 acres (2,000 ha).

=== September 1–31 ===
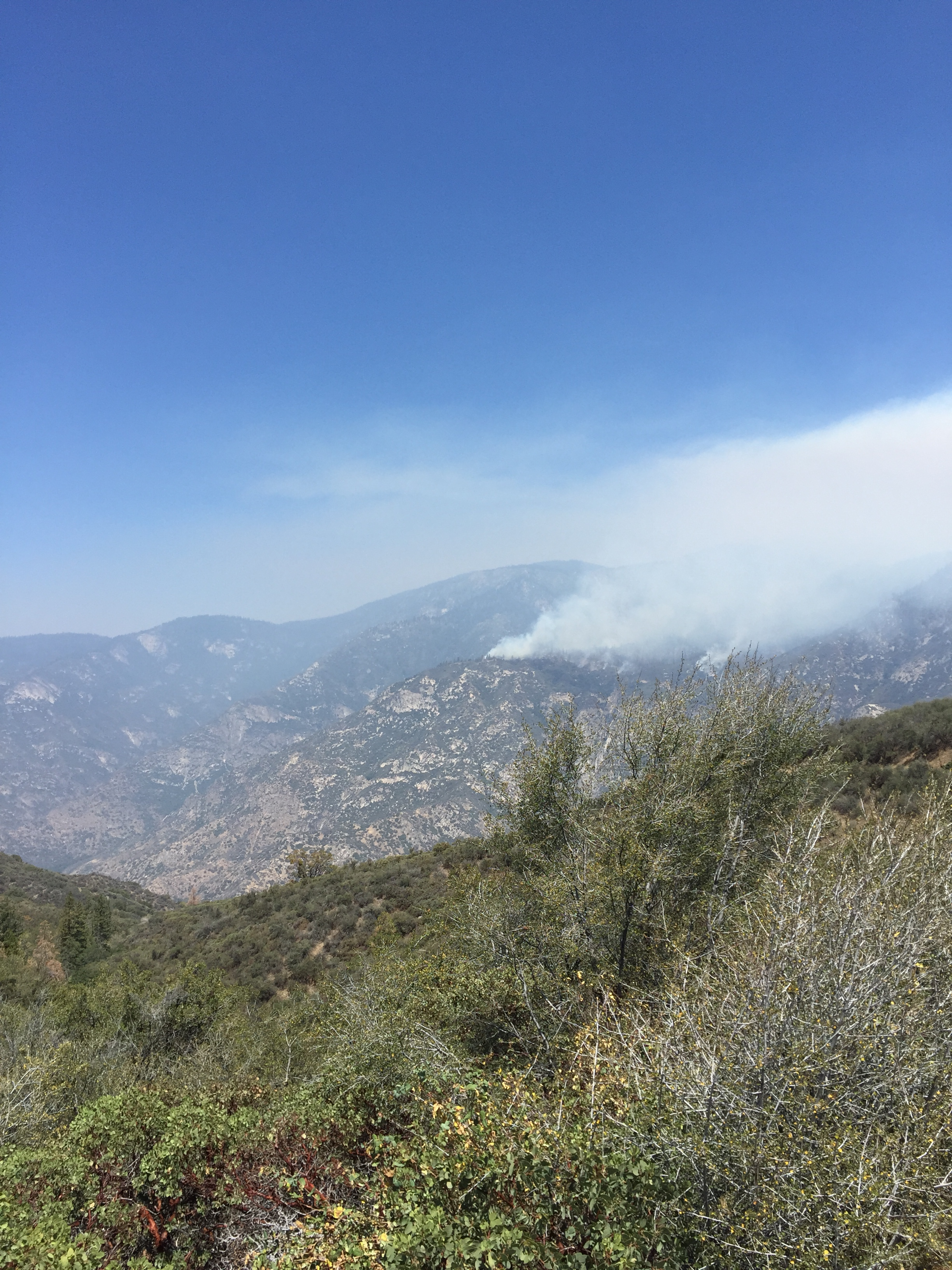
The Rough Fire as viewed on August 8—the area this picture was taken from burned one week later

On September 2, over 2,500 people were safely evacuated from Hume Lake Christian Camps and surrounding area. All camp events were cancelled and only security personnel remained.

On September 5, the fire reached Kings Canyon National Park as it crossed the 85,800-acre (347 km^{2}) mark.

On September 7, a severely burned firefighter was airlifted to the Community Regional Medical Center in Fresno.

On September 10, officials at Kings Canyon National Park began evacuating all visitors and employees from the Wilsonia and General Grant Grove areas. A mandatory evacuation order was issued for Dunlap, effective September 11.

On September 14, moisture and lower temperatures associated with the remnants of Hurricane Linda arrived in the southern Sierra. Light rain fell in Sierra/Sequoia National Forests and Kings Canyon, allowing firefighters to access the fire directly instead of preparing control lines at a distance.

On September 15, as the fire slowed and with favorable weather conditions, evacuation orders and warnings in Dunlap and Squaw Valley were lifted. By that time, 3,742 firefighters, 345 engines, 19 helicopters and 45 bulldozers had been deployed.

=== October 1 onwards ===
The Rough Fire was declared 100 percent contained on November 6, and then declared controlled sometime later in the month. The total cost of the firefighting effort was estimated by the National Interagency Coordination Center at $120.93 million.

The fire was, at the time it occurred, the thirteenth largest in recorded California history and the largest in the history of Fresno County. It no longer numbers among even the twenty largest fires in the state.

== Effects ==
The Rough Fire destroyed four structures. One of these was the Kings Canyon Lodge off Highway 180 in Kings Canyon National Park.

More than one hundred giant sequoia trees died in the Rough Fire.

The total number of evacuees reached more than 2,500 on August 20, following the fire's leap across the Kings River and Highway 180.

On September 11, Fresno health officials reported an unprecedented increase in hospital emergency department visits due to respiratory problems, and urged residents to avoid outdoor activities when the air is smoky.

== Area by ownership ==
As of October 6, 2015, the total burned area breaks down into:

Owner	Acres	Km^{2}
Sequoia National Forest	82,573	334.2
Sierra National Forest	58,541	236.9
Kings Canyon National Park	9,413	38.1
Private lands	1,090	4.4
State lands	6	0.0
Total	151,623	613.6

== Growth and containment ==
Fire containment status Gray: contained; Red: active; %: percent contained;
Date	Total area burned	Personnel	Containment
Jul 31	...	...	...
Aug 1	...	...	...
Aug 2	26 acres (11 ha)	...	
Aug 3	65 acres (26 ha)	...	
Aug 4	...	...	...
Aug 5	450 acres (182 ha)	...	
Aug 6	500 acres (202 ha)	274 personnel	
Aug 7	975 acres (395 ha)	...	
Aug 8	1,200 acres (486 ha)	321 personnel	
Aug 9	3,770 acres (1,526 ha)	...	
Aug 10	5,217 acres (2,111 ha)	...	
Aug 11	6,815 acres (2,758 ha)	...	
Aug 12	9,918 acres (4,014 ha)	...	
Aug 13	...	...	...
Aug 14	13,267 acres (5,369 ha)	...	
Aug 15	...	...	...
Aug 16	16,258 acres (6,579 ha)	...	
Aug 17	20,978 acres (8,489 ha)	1,064 personnel	
Aug 18	23,600 acres (9,551 ha)	1,098 personnel	
Aug 19	30,901 acres (12,505 ha)	1,141 personnel	
Aug 20	32,414 acres (13,117 ha)	1,501 personnel	
Aug 21	39,400 acres (15,945 ha)	1,605 personnel	
Aug 22	47,079 acres (19,052 ha)	1,484 personnel	
Aug 23	47,396 acres (19,180 ha)	2,275 personnel	
Aug 24	49,440 acres (20,008 ha)	2,126 personnel	
Aug 25	51,794 acres (20,960 ha)	1,984 personnel	
Aug 26	55,900 acres (22,622 ha)	2,152 personnel	
Aug 27	55,989 acres (22,658 ha)	2,051 personnel	
Aug 28	60,238 acres (24,377 ha)	2,033 personnel	
Aug 29	61,316 acres (24,814 ha)	2,068 personnel	
Aug 30	66,542 acres (26,929 ha)	2,121 personnel	
Aug 31	72,300 acres (29,259 ha)	2,121 personnel	
Sep 1	77,287 acres (31,277 ha)	2,121 personnel	
Sep 2	79,973 acres (32,364 ha)	1,901 personnel	
Sep 3	81,549 acres (33,002 ha)	1,901 personnel	
Sep 4	83,464 acres (33,777 ha)	1,902 personnel	
Sep 5	85,894 acres (34,760 ha)	2,038 personnel	
Sep 6	85,894 acres (34,760 ha)	1,967 personnel	
Sep 7	95,183 acres (38,519 ha)	1,940 personnel	
Sep 8	97,884 acres (39,612 ha)	1,960 personnel	
Sep 9	103,244 acres (41,781 ha)	1,900 personnel	
Sep 10	110,134 acres (44,570 ha)	1,900 personnel	
Sep 11	119,069 acres (48,186 ha)	2,229 personnel	
Sep 12	128,796 acres (52,122 ha)	2,570 personnel	
Sep 13	129,877 acres (52,559 ha)	2,961 personnel	
Sep 14	138,053 acres (55,868 ha)	3,073 personnel	
Sep 15	139,133 acres (56,305 ha)	3,741 personnel	
Sep 16	140,760 acres (56,964 ha)	3,742 personnel	
Sep 17	141,036 acres (57,075 ha)	2,267 personnel	
Sep 18	141,201 acres (57,142 ha)	1,411 personnel	
Sep 19	141,491 acres (57,259 ha)	1,493 personnel	
Sep 20	141,599 acres (57,303 ha)	1,381 personnel	
Sep 21	141,950 acres (57,445 ha)	1,495 personnel	
Sep 22	142,629 acres (57,720 ha)	1,510 personnel	
Sep 23	143,559 acres (58,096 ha)	1,334 personnel	
Sep 24	143,559 acres (58,096 ha)	1,070 personnel	
Sep 25	143,559 acres (58,096 ha)	935 personnel	
Sep 26	150,876 acres (61,057 ha)	787 personnel	
Sep 27	150,876 acres (61,057 ha)	654 personnel	
Sep 28	151,493 acres (61,307 ha)	651 personnel	
Sep 29	...	...	...
Sep 30	151,623 acres (61,360 ha)	344 personnel	
...	...	...	...
Nov 6	151,623 acres (61,360 ha)	...	
