= Fire River =

Fire River may refer to:

- Fire River (Ontario), Canada
- Fire River, Ontario, Canada
- Little Fire River, a river in northeastern Ontario, Canada

== See also ==
- River fire (disambiguation)
