= River fire =

River fire may refer to:

- Mendocino Complex Fire, a 2018 California wildfire that consisted of the smaller fires, the River Fire and the Ranch Fire
- Cuyahoga River in Ohio, a river famous for catching fire in 1969
- River Fire (2020), a wildfire in Monterey County, California
- River Fire (2021), a wildfire in Placer and Nevada Counties, California
- River Complex 2021 fires, a wildfire complex in Siskiyou County, California

== See also ==
- River of Fire (disambiguation)
- RiverFire, an event on the Brisbane River in Queensland, Australia
- Fire River (disambiguation)
- River fires
