= Antelope Fire =

2021 wildfire in California

- Part of the 2021 California wildfires
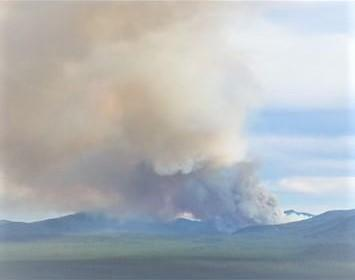
- The Antelope Fire on August 3, 2021
- Date: August 1, 2021 –; October 15, 2021
- Location: Klamath National Forest, Siskiyou County, California, United States
- Coordinates: 41.521°N 121.919°W

Statistics
- Burned area: 145,632 acres (58,935 ha)

Ignition
- Cause: Lightning strike

Map
- Location in California

The Antelope Fire was a large wildfire that burned in the Klamath National Forest, the Modoc National Forest, the Shasta-Trinity National Forest, and in Lava Beds National Monument in Siskiyou County, California, in the United States. The fire was started by a lightning strike and was first reported on August 1, 2021. As of October 15, the fire had burned 145,632 acres (58,935 ha).

== Progression ==
=== August ===
The Antelope Fire was first reported in the drainage of Antelope Creek in the Goosenest Ranger District of the Klamath National Forest in Siskiyou County, California, on August 1, 2021, around 10:30 AM. The fire was one of many started by lightning strikes in the area during a thunderstorm. The fire was fueled by ponderosa pine and mixed conifer. On August 3, the communities of Bray, Tennant, and Antelope Creek were evacuated due to the fire. The fire spread through the Antelope Creek drainage, growing to 2,700 acres (1,093 ha) by the end of the day. On August 4, a temporary flight restriction was put in place for the fire area. Overnight, red flag warning conditions enabled the fire to grow to over 20,000 acres (8,094 ha). The fire burned around the town of Tennant and threatened the community of Antelope Creek. Additional evacuation orders were put in place for Mount Hebron and areas of Round Valley later in the day. On August 5, Governor Gavin Newsom declared a state of emergency due to the Antelope Fire.

Overnight from August 5 to the morning of the 6th, the fire exhibited extreme fire behavior, including flame lengths over 100 feet. The fire pushed east toward Garner Mountain as fire crews worked to further protect Tennant, Bray and Shasta Wood. By August 7, the fire was 20 percent contained and had started burning in Shasta-Trinity National Forest. Evacuation orders were extended to Shasta Wood and Duck Lake and the communities of Medicine Lake, Payne Springs, and Blanche Lake were place under evacuation warnings. The Forest Service also closed the forest area in and around the fire. The fire was 24 percent contained at 41,958 acres (16,980 ha) by August 8. An evacuation warning for Red Rock Road was put in place and the evacuation center in Dorris was moved to Yreka, California. A 20-30 acre spot fire crossed the control line on the eastern perimeter near Garner Mountain, which was contained as soon as possible by firefighters. As of August 25, the fire had burned 69,700 acres (28,207 ha) and was 37 percent contained.

=== September ===
Fire activity remained minimal until September 8, when extreme fire behavior occurred under a red flag warning. Over the next week, the fire pushed into the Lava Beds National Monument and behind Sheepy Ridge, effectively doubling in size. After the red flag warning was lifted, the fire showed no significant fire growth.

=== October ===
The rugged terrain in the fire zone made containment a slow process. Crews focused on using handlines, dozer lines, and defensive burning to minimize fire spread, protect timber resources, and minimize the fire's impact on the landscape. On October 15, the Antelope Fire was 100% contained.

== Effects ==
=== Closures ===
Portions of Klamath National Forest were closed through November 25, 2021, due to the fire.

=== Environment ===
Air quality was impacted in the region surrounding the fire. Ash was reported as "blanketing cars" and smoke "choking the air" in the Klamath Basin. In early August, smoke and ash from the fire reached the Bootleg Fire in Oregon, which helped to curb the Bootleg's growth.

=== Recreation and tourism ===
Like many fires burning during the 2021 California wildfire season, the Antelope Fire deeply impacted recreational and tourism activities in the area. On August 7, the forest service closed Klamath National Forest due to the Antelope and nearby Tennant Fire. The closure was lifted on November 25, 2021.

== Gallery ==
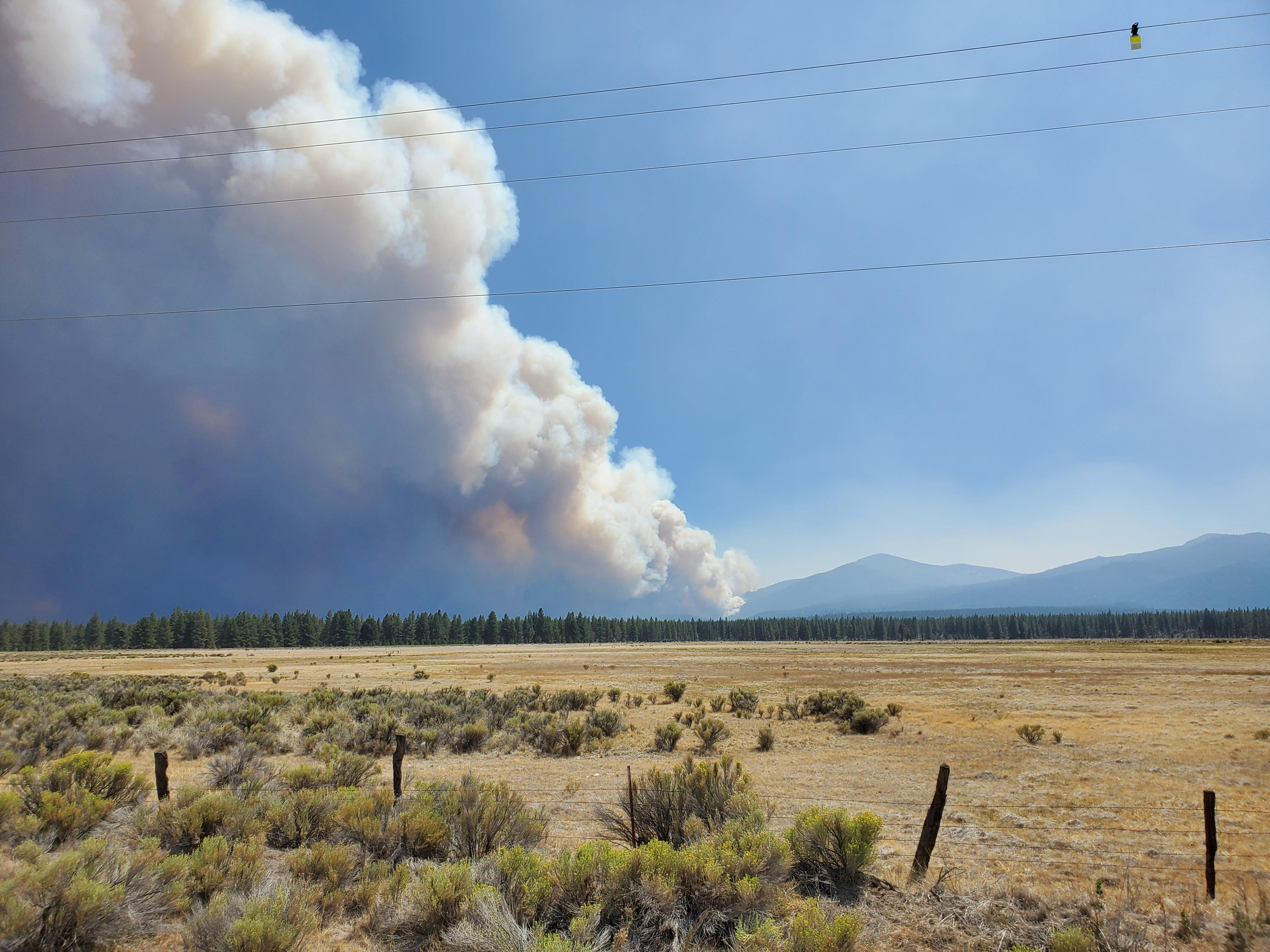
The Antelope Fire on August 4, 2021.

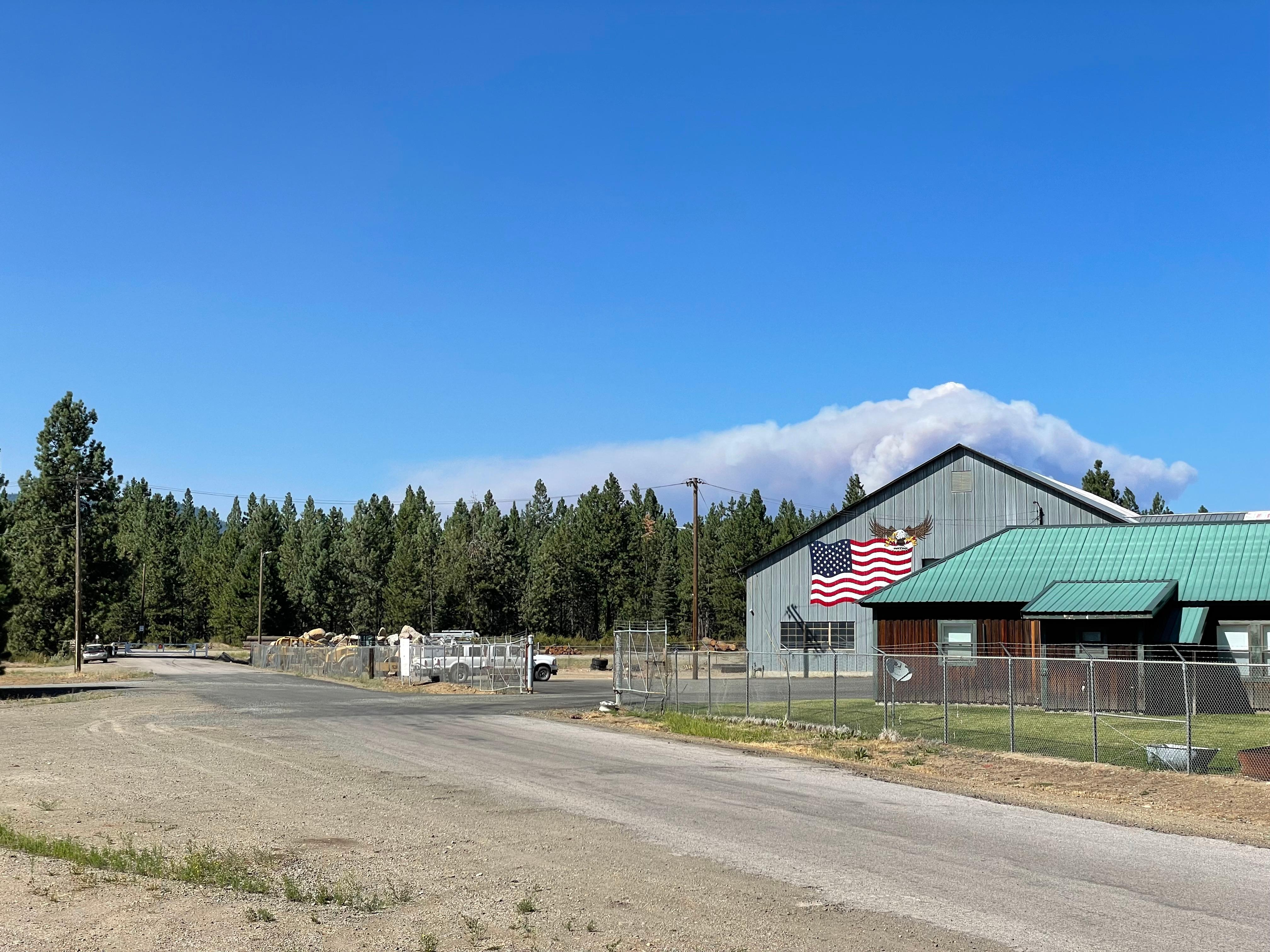
The fire seen from McCloud, California, on August 4, 2021.

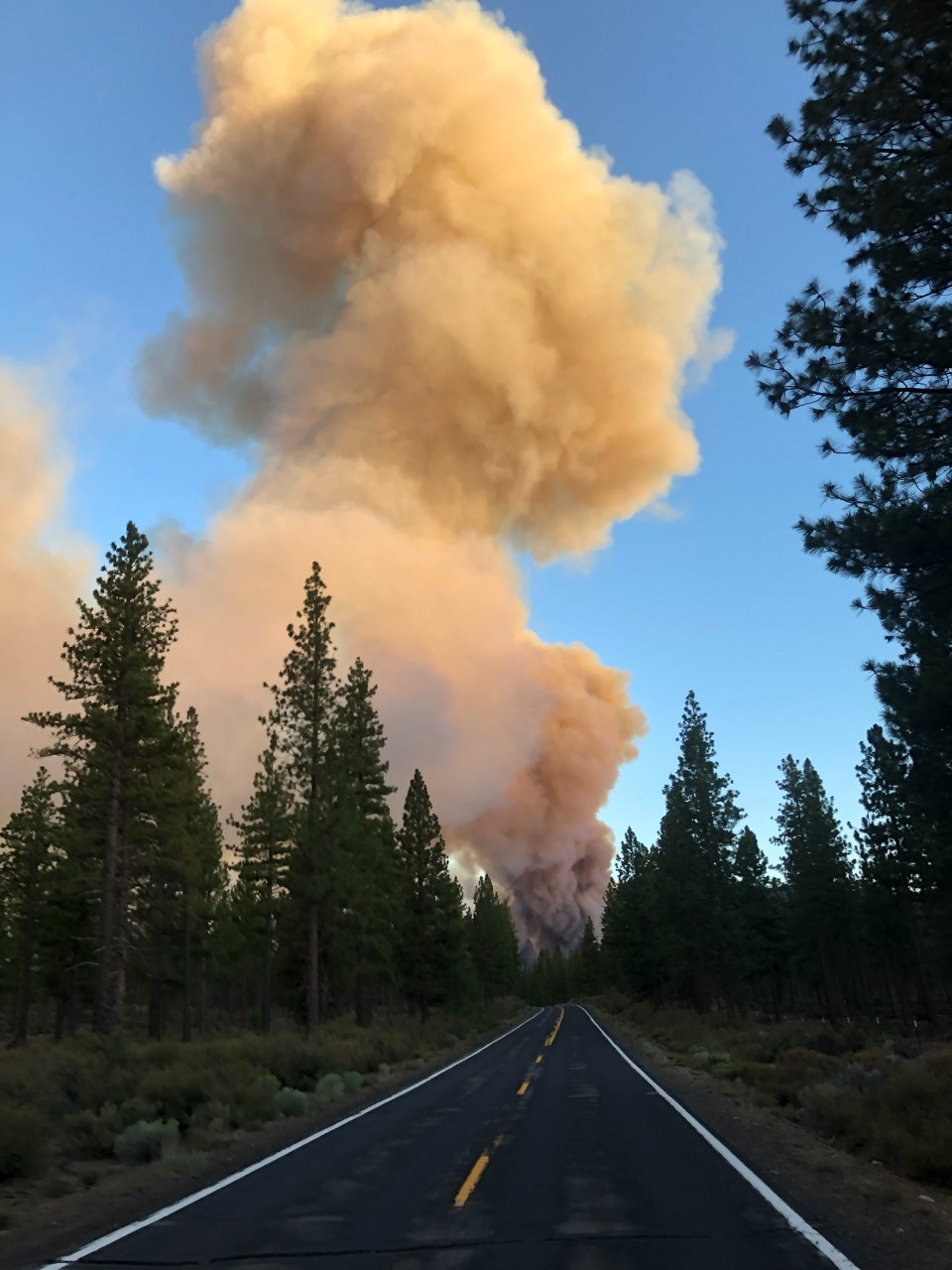
A smoke plume erupts on August 5, 2021.

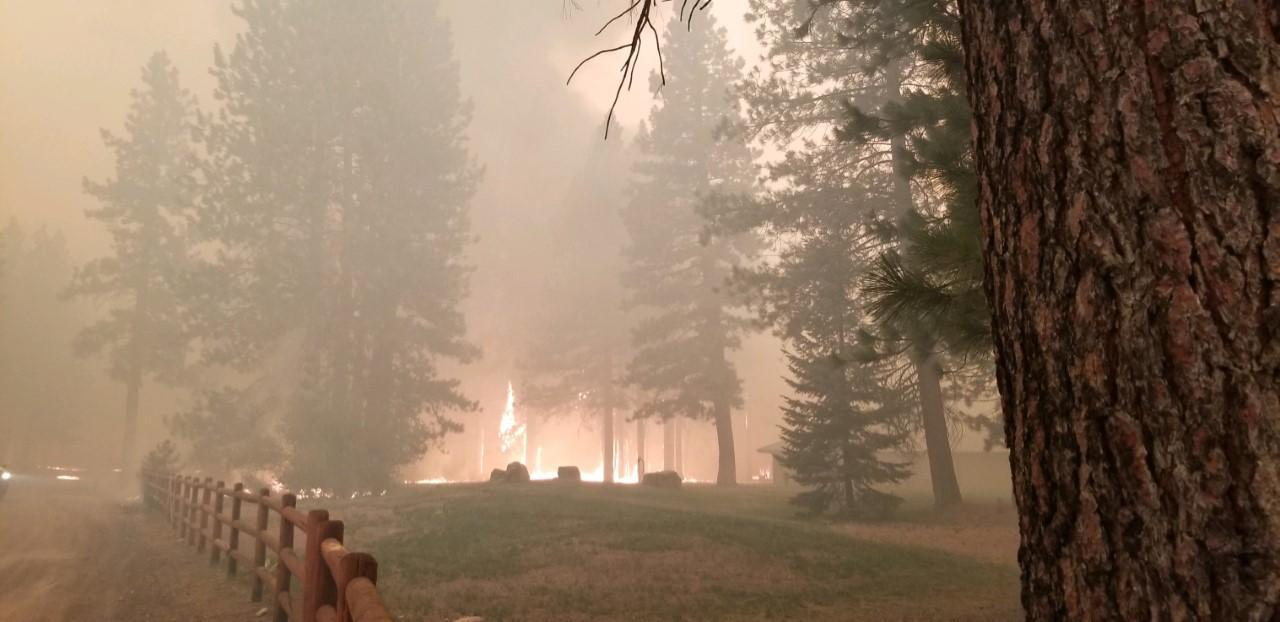
A backfire set by firefighters in Fish Camp on August 5, 2021.

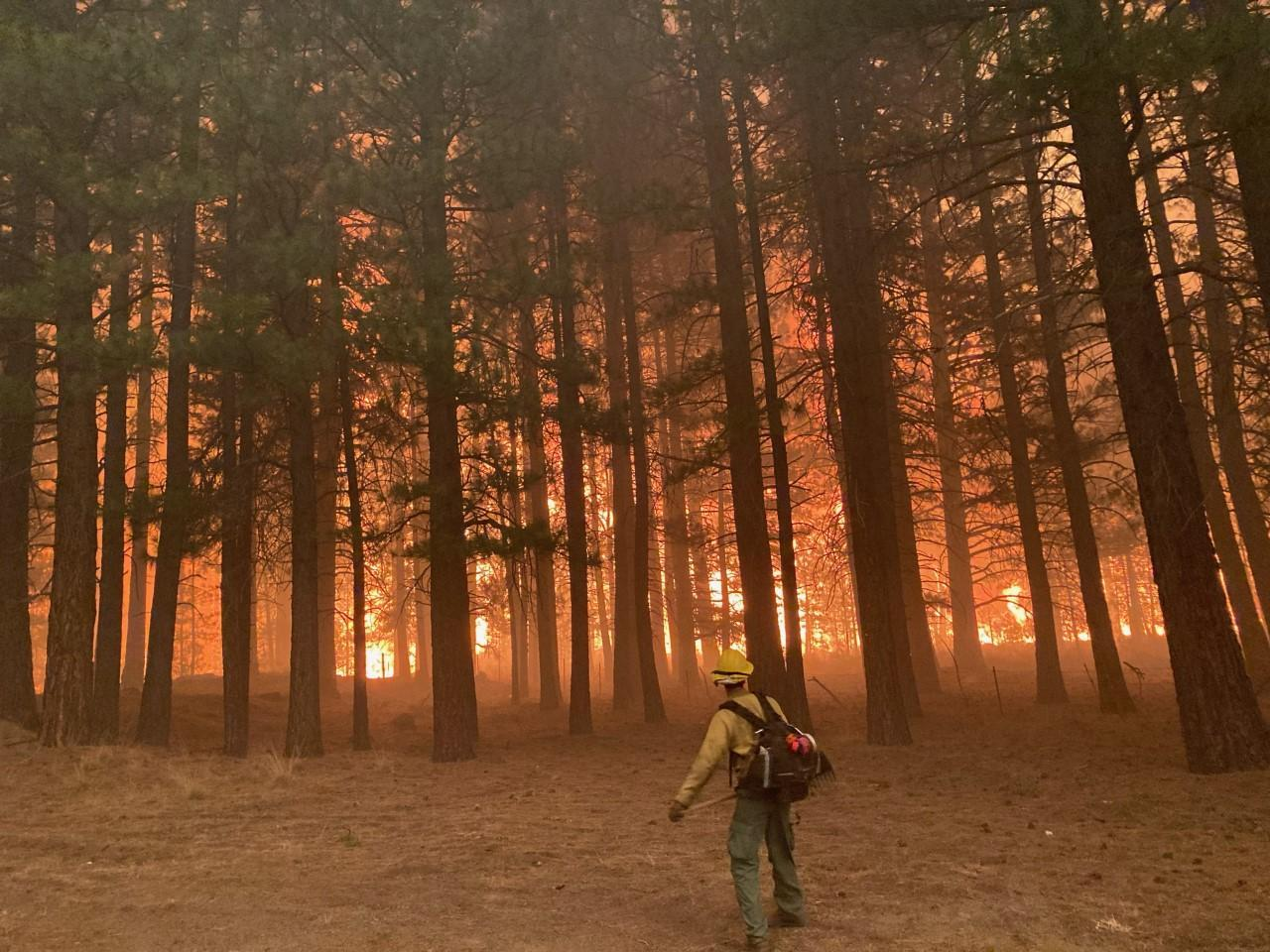
A firefighter watches impeding flames on August 7, 2021.

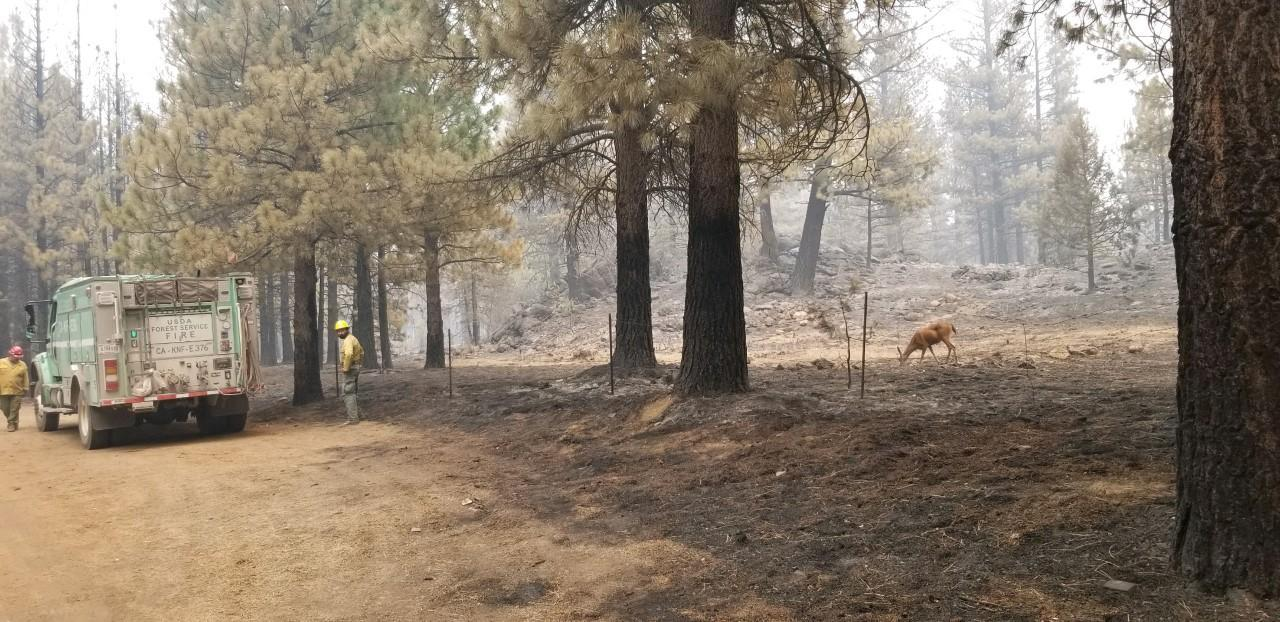
A deer grazes in the burn zone near Tennant on August 8, 2021.
