= Dishnish, Ontario =

Dishnish
- Railway point
- Location in Ontario
- Coordinates: 48°51′19″N 83°43′03″W
- Country: Canada
- Province: Ontario
- District: Algoma
- Geographic township: Legge
- Elevation: 327 m (1,073 ft)
- Time zone: UTC-5 (Eastern Time Zone)
  - Summer (DST): UTC-4 (Eastern Time Zone)
- Postal Code FSA: P0M

Dishnish is an unincorporated place and railway point in geographic Legge Township, in the Unorganized North part of Algoma District in northeastern Ontario, Canada. It is on the Canadian National Railway transcontinental railway main line between the Dispersed Rural Community of Minnipuka to the west and the railway point of Fire River to the east, has a passing track, and is passed but not served by Via Rail transcontinental Canadian passenger trains. The place is on Dishnish Creek, a left tributary of the Fire River.

== History ==
Dishnish is part of a section of what was originally the Canadian Northern Railway that was under construction from 1912 to 1913.
