= McCash Fire =

2021 wildfire in Northern California

- Part of the 2021 California wildfires
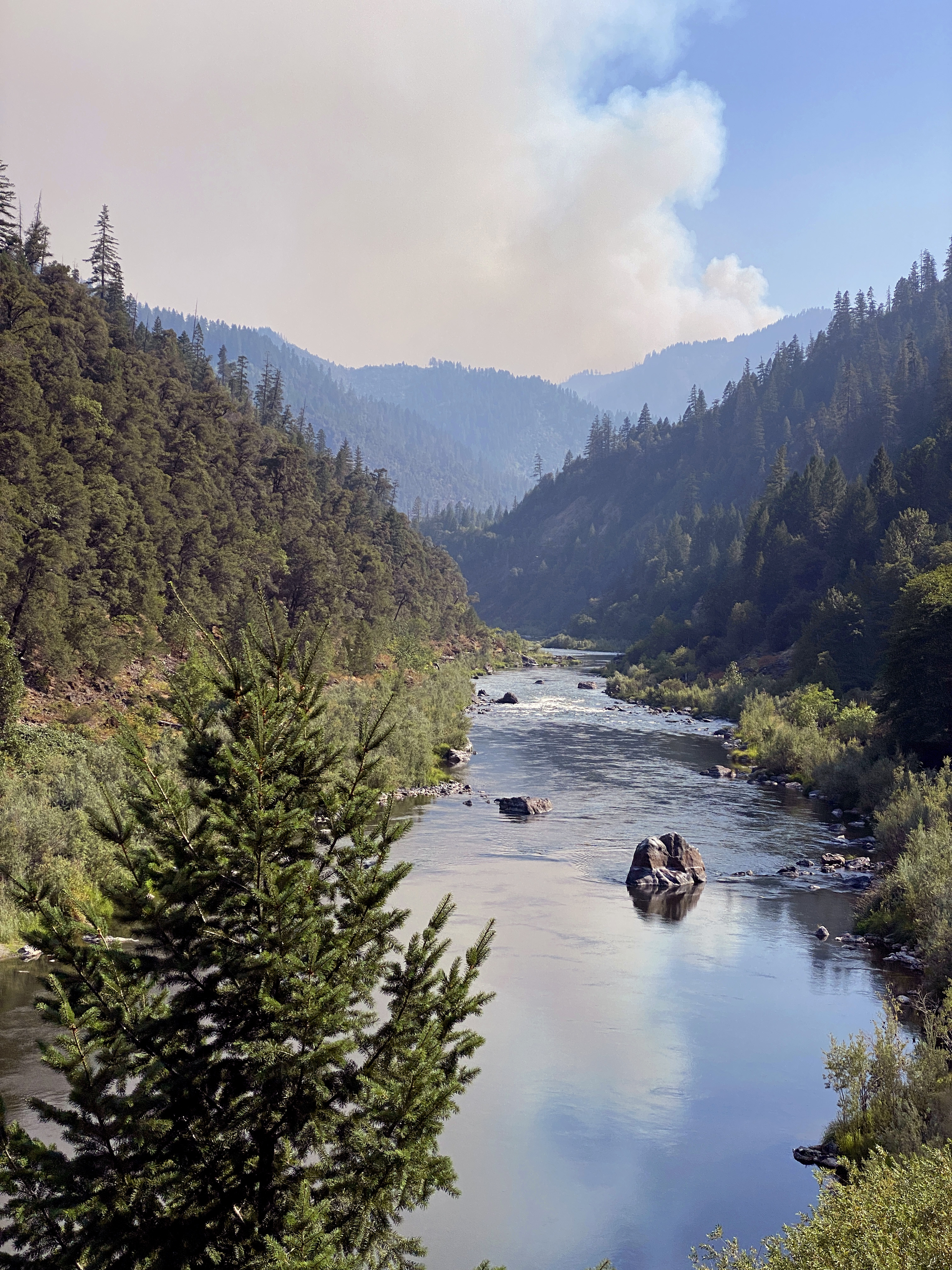
- A smoke column from the McCash Fire rises above the Klamath River on August 25, 2021
- Date: July 31 –; October 27, 2021; (89 days)
- Location: Siskiyou County, Northern California, United States
- Coordinates: 41.564°N 123.404°W

Statistics
- Burned area: 94,962 acres (38,430 ha; 148 sq mi; 384 km^{2})

Impacts
- Deaths: 1
- Structures destroyed: 0
- Cost: $53.3 million

Ignition
- Cause: Lightning

Map
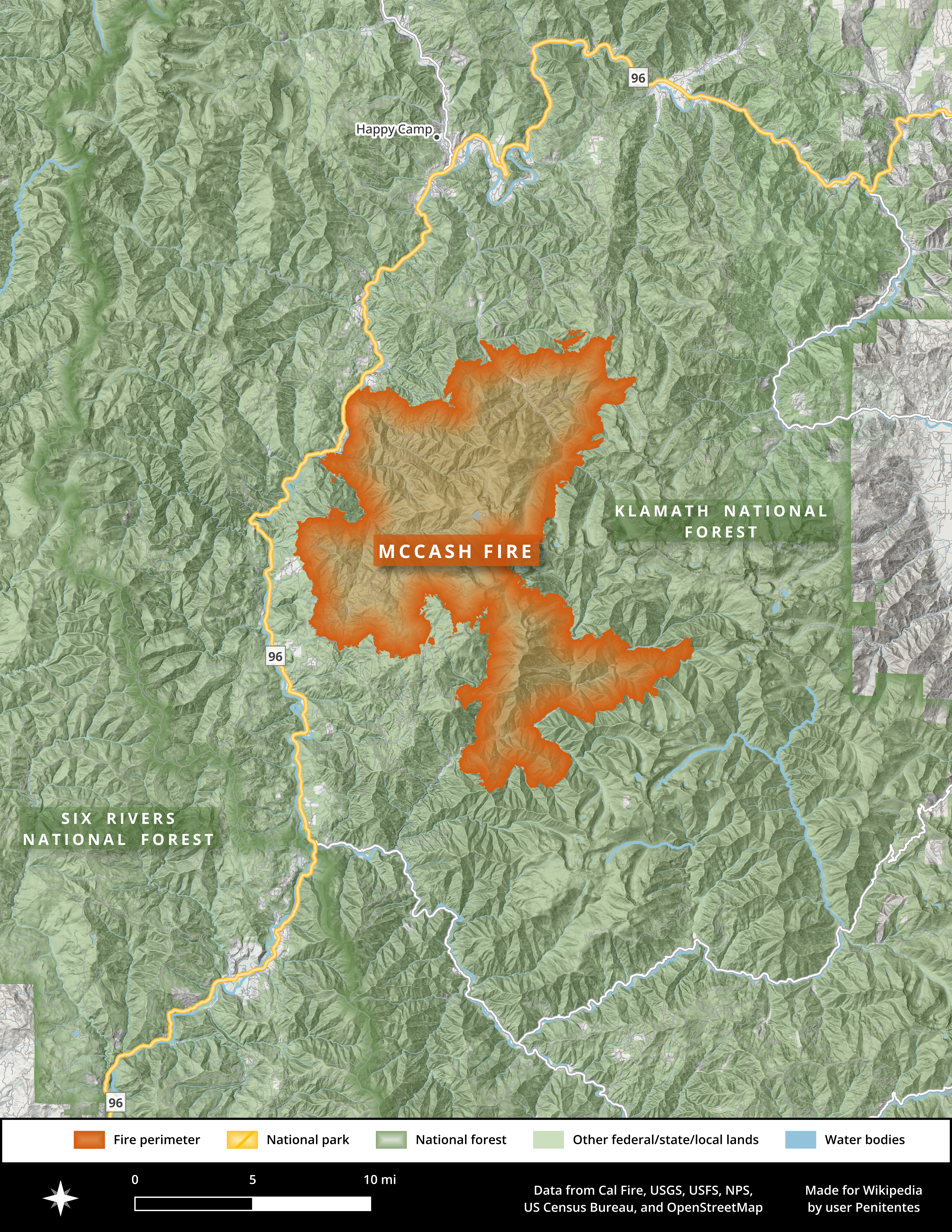
- This map shows the footprint of the McCash Fire in the Klamath National Forest

- The McCash Fire burned in far northwestern California.

The McCash Fire was a large wildfire in Siskiyou County in Northern California during the 2021 California wildfire season. Ignited by lightning on July 31, the fire burned 94,962 acres (38,430 hectares) before its containment on October 27. The fire burned within the Klamath National Forest and the Six Rivers National Forest.

== Progression ==
The McCash Fire was one of multiple large wildfires, including the Monument and McFarland fires, ignited by thunderstorms in Northern California in late July. It was first detected on July 31 at about 7:00 p.m., burning in the McCash Fork drainage of Ukonom Creek (from which the incident got its name). The area is a rugged and inaccessible part of the Six Rivers National Forest. By the afternoon of August 2, the fire had burned 500 acres (200 ha) of primarily timber understory, brush, and grass near Bear Mountain. At this point, 172 personnel were engaged on the fire, including three hotshot crews, a group of smokejumpers, and two helicopters. The fire initially burned east, reaching the Marble Mountain Wilderness two miles (3.2 km) distant by August 5. At that point, mapping assessed the fire as having burned 1,161 acres (470 ha).

A month after the fire's detection, it had burned 38,906 acres (15,745 ha). In the first nine days of September the fire's growth accelerated, reaching 69,725 acres (28,217 ha). At the height of the fire, firefighters employed nine aircraft: eight helicopters and a supervisory fixed-wing air attack plane.

Between 1.2 and 1.4 inches (3.6 cm) of rain fell over the fire on September 18 and 19, temporarily miring firefighting operations with muddy roads and cloud cover as the fire remained 22 percent contained. Though immediately followed by warm and dry conditions, the subdued fire activity following the wet weather meant that firefighters were able to engage the fire directly (see direct attack) on its northern, western, and southern flanks. The eastern side of the fire in the Marble Mountain Wilderness was held in check by old fire scars as officials opted for a confinement strategy instead of direct attack.

Containment of the fire reached 48 percent by September 27 as another weather system moved through the area and dropped 0.6–0.8 inches (1.5–2.0 cm) of rain. The incident management team characterized fire suppression operations as "largely complete" by September 29. All evacuation warnings and orders still in place were lifted on October 13, 2021, with minimal fire activity.

The McCash Fire was declared 100 percent contained by 6:00 p.m. on October 27, 2021. The cost of containing the fire was calculated at $53.3 million in 2021 dollars ($63.3 million adjusted for inflation). The fire burned 94,962 acres (38,430 ha) in total; a post-fire environmental evaluation estimated that 53,636 acres (21,706 ha) had burned within the Klamath National Forest, 41,051 acres (16,613 ha) had burned within the Six Rivers National Forest, and the remaining ~200 acres (81 ha) had burned on private or other types of land.

== Effects ==
The sole casualty of the McCash Fire was 41-year-old wildland firefighter and paramedic Marshall Grant Brookfield. Brookfield contracted COVID-19 and a fungal infection associated with wildfires and smoke inhalation while deployed to Orleans in September and passed away after several weeks in the ICU.

No structures were damaged or destroyed by the fire.

The burned area emergency response (BAER) team assigned to the McCash Fire analyzed soil burn severity across the fire footprint using remote sensing and soil data from the field. Separate from vegetation burn severity, soil burn severity is a qualitative metric based on the amount of remaining surface material, soil stability, and soil hydrophobicity. Soil burn severity influences post-fire runoff and debris flow issues. The BAER team found that the McCash Fire's overall footprint burned at 69 percent very low/low, 26 percent moderate, and five percent high soil burn severity.

== See also ==
- Monument Fire
- McFarland Fire
