= 2021 California wildfires =

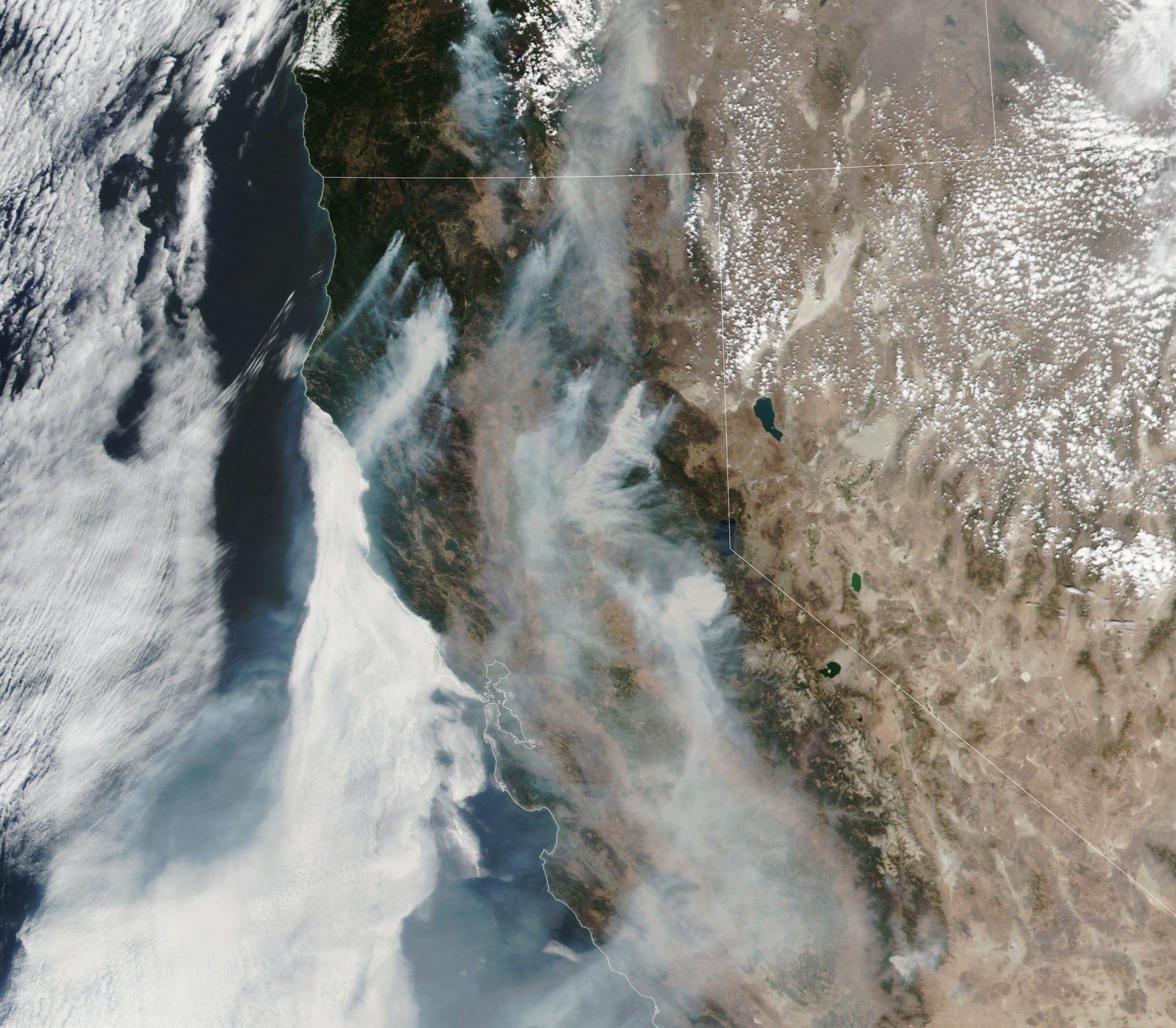
- Smoke from multiple wildfires in California
- Date: January 14 – December 16

Statistics
- Total fires: 7,396
- Total area: 2,569,386 acres (1,039,794 ha)

Impacts
- Deaths: 3
- Injuries: 22
- Structures destroyed: 3,846
- Cost: Unknown

Map
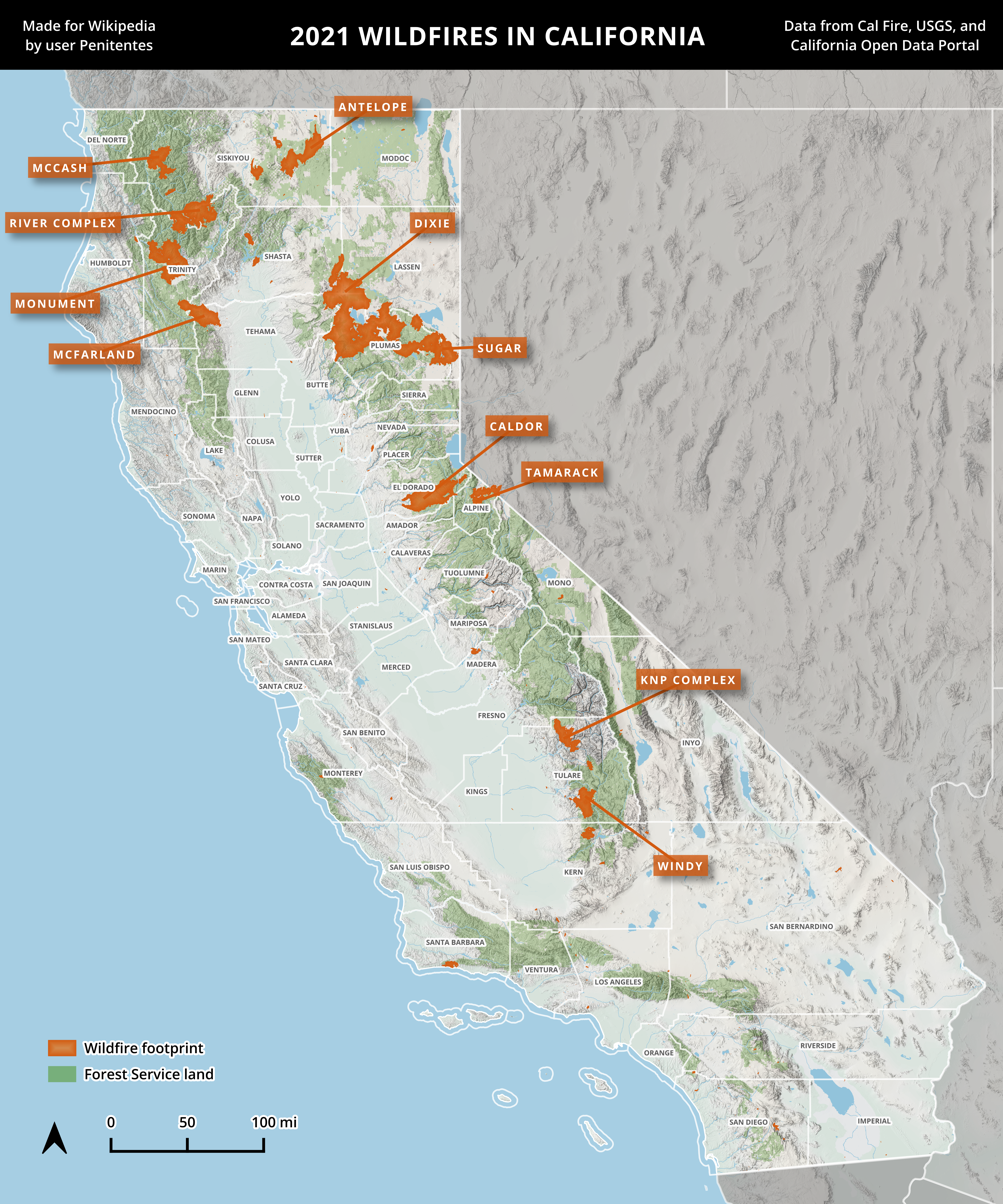
- A map of wildfires in California in 2021, using Cal Fire data

By the end of 2021, a total of 7,396 wildfires burned 2,569,386 acres (1,039,794 ha) across the U.S. state of California. Approximately 3,629 structures were damaged or destroyed by the wildfires, and three firefighters died during the wildfire season.

The wildfire season in California experienced an unusually early start amid an ongoing drought and historically low rainfall and reservoir levels. In January 2021 alone, 297 fires burned 1,171 acres (4.74 km^{2}) on nonfederal land according to the California Department of Forestry and Fire Protection, which is almost triple the number of fires and more than 20 times the acreage of the five-year average for January. The January fires were exacerbated by unseasonably strong Santa Ana winds, and some of them burned in the same areas as previous fires like the CZU Lightning Complex.

The long term trend is that wildfires in the state are increasing due to climate change in California. The 2021 wildfire season was exceptionally severe in California, although it did not approach the extent of the previous year's wildfire season, which was the largest season in the state's recorded history. By July 11 of that year, more than three times as many acres had burned compared to the previous year, with drought, extreme heat, and reduced snowpack contributing to the severity of the fires. The state also faced an increased risk of post-wildfire landslides.

As of August 18, 2021, the state of California was facing "unprecedented fire conditions" as multiple fires including the Dixie Fire, McFarland Fire, Caldor Fire, and others, raged on. The USDA Forest Service temporarily closed all of California's national forests at the end of August to mitigate the impact of potential fires.

On October 18, 2021, much of the state—particularly Northern California, where the majority of the significant fires had been located—received its first major precipitation since the start of the wildfire season. This significantly lowered wildfire risk in the region.

== Background ==
The timing of "fire season" in California is variable, depending on the amount of prior winter and spring precipitation, the frequency and severity of weather such as heat waves and wind events, and moisture content in vegetation. Northern California typically sees wildfire activity between late spring and early fall, peaking in the summer with hotter and drier conditions. Occasional cold frontal passages can bring wind and lightning. The timing of fire season in Southern California is similar, peaking between late spring and fall. The severity and duration of peak activity in either part of the state is modulated in part by weather events: downslope/offshore wind events can lead to critical fire weather, while onshore flow and Pacific weather systems can bring conditions that hamper wildfire growth.

== Impact ==
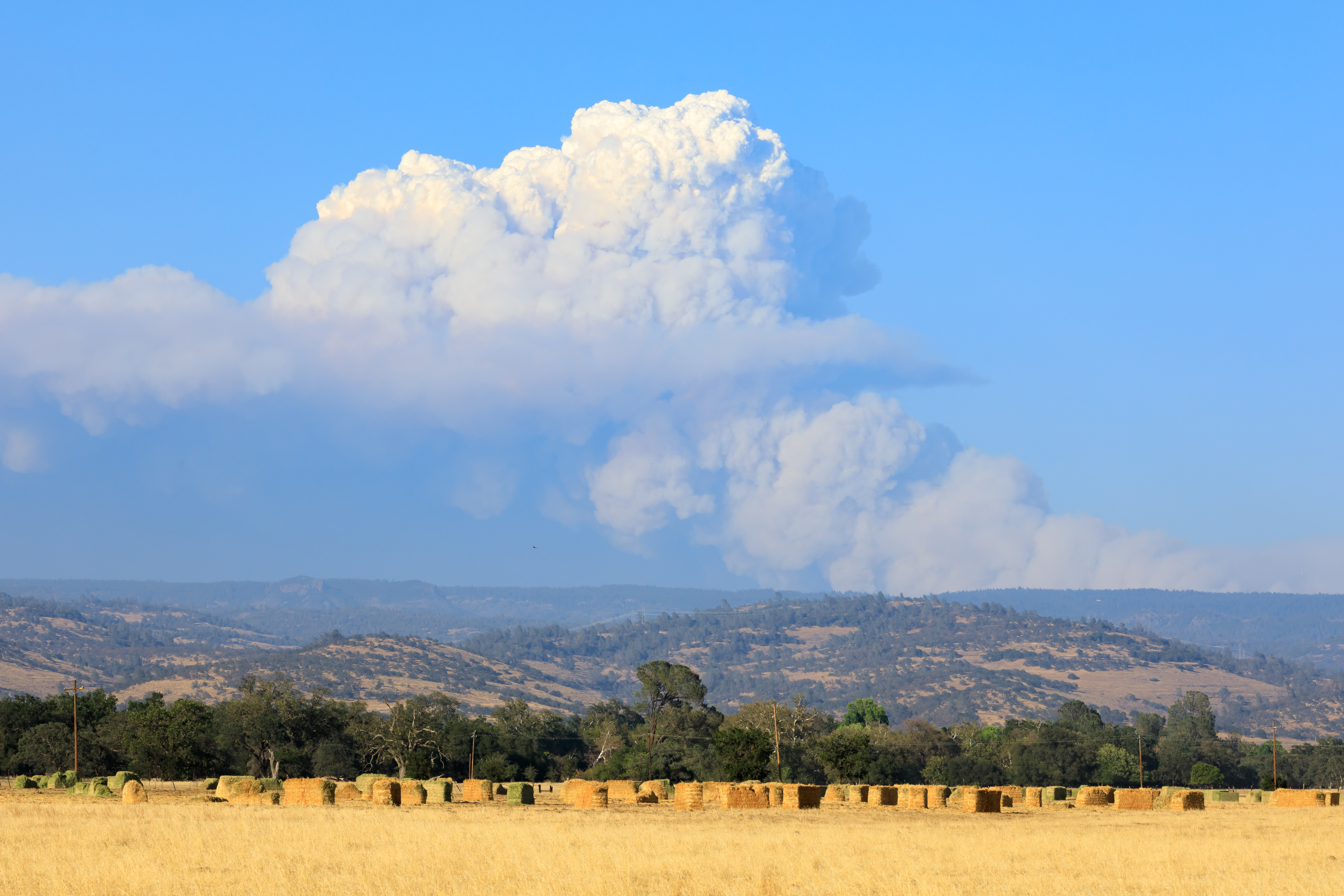
Fire cloud produced by the Dixie Fire, which became the largest single (non-complex) wildfire in California history by August 6, 2021

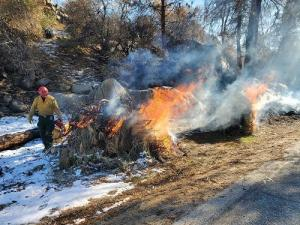
Firefighters setting a prescribed fire on January 27, 2021 near Ant Canyon in Kern County

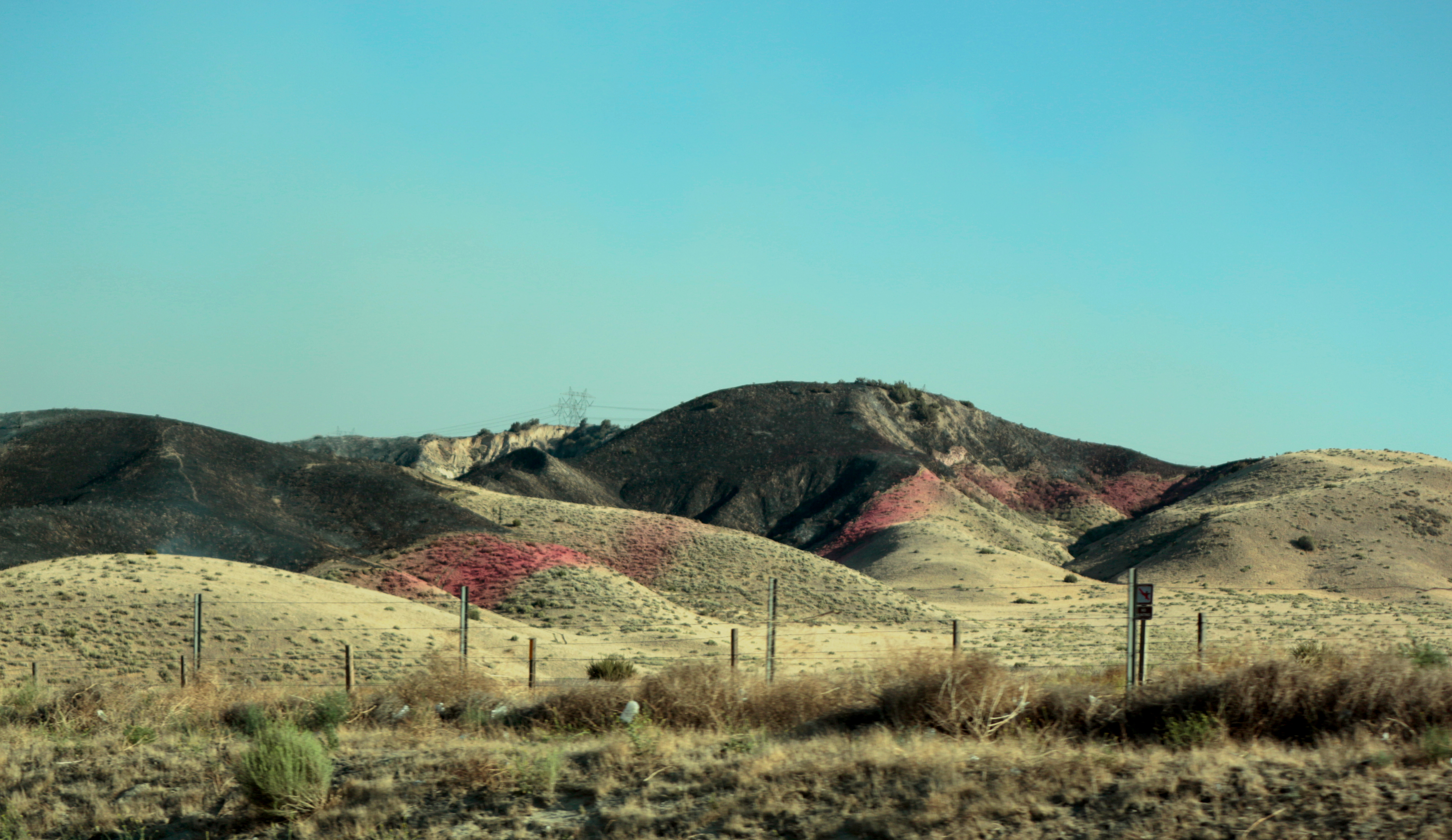
Fire retardant and smoldering brush in the Tumbleweed Fire north of Los Angeles in July 2021

PG&E and other utility companies preemptively spent billions of dollars to reduce the risk of wildfires and avoid an year similar to the previous year's fire season. Firefighters have also set prescribed fires to prevent other fires burning. During evacuations from the Lava Fire, an illegal marijuana farmer was shot and killed by police after brandishing a firearm at authorities, while "defending his farm".

A 2023 study found that these wildfires are affecting the California ecosystem and disrupting the habitats. It found that in the 2020 and 2021 fire seasons 58% of the area affected by wildfires occurred in those two seasons since 2012. These two fires destroyed 30% of the habitat of 50 species as well as 100 species that had 10% of their habitats burn. 5-14% of the species' habitats burned at a "high severity."

== List of wildfires ==
The Government of California's video about COVID-19 protocols in place at wildfire evacuation centers

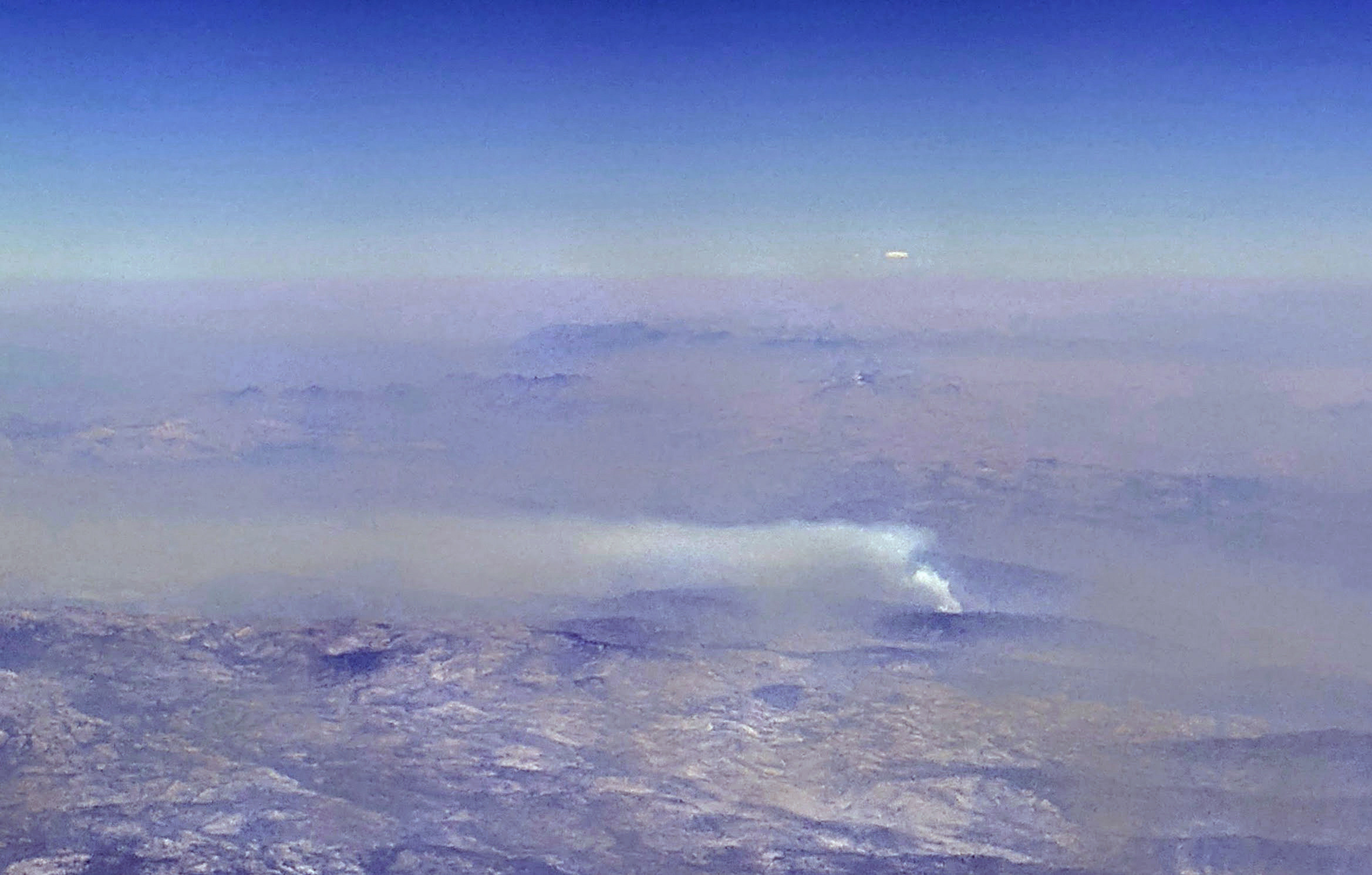
Aerial view from the northwest of the Tiltill Fire's smoke plume, just north of the Hetch Hetchy in Yosemite

The following is a list of fires that burned more than 1,000 acres (400 ha), or produced significant structural damage or casualties.

Name	County	Acres	Start date	Containment date (Note: Containment means that fire crews have established and secured control lines around the fire's perimeter. These lines are artificial barriers, like trenches or cleared vegetation, designed to stop the fire's spread, or natural barriers like rivers. Containment reflects progress in managing the fire but does not necessarily mean the fire is starved of fuel, under control, or put out.)	Notes	Ref
Owens	Kern	1,512	May 1	May 7	Unknown cause	
Southern	San Diego	5,366	May 2	May 6	4 structures destroyed	
Palisades	Los Angeles	1,202	May 14	May 26	Human-caused, suspected arson; 1 firefighter injured	
Sargents	Monterey	1,100	May 30	June 2	Unknown cause	
Sierra	San Diego	1,000	June 9	June 12		
Willow	Monterey	2,877	June 17	July 12	Unknown cause	
Mojave	San Bernardino	2,490	June 17	June 26	Caused by lightning	
Nettle	Tulare	1,265	June 18	July 2		
Henry	Alpine	1,320	June 24	July 27	Caused by lightning	
Lava	Siskiyou	26,409	June 25	September 3	Caused by lightning; 23 structures destroyed; 1 structure damaged; 6 firefighters injured	
Shell	Kern	1,984	June 27	July 2	Caused by a car fire	
Tennant	Siskiyou	10,580	June 28	July 12	Unknown cause; 9 structures destroyed	
Salt	Shasta	12,660	June 30	July 19	Caused by hot material falling off of a vehicle; 43 structures destroyed	
East Fork	Alpine	1,136	July 1	July 11	Caused by lightning	
Beckwourth Complex	Plumas, Lassen	105,670	July 3	September 22	Caused by lightning; includes the Dotta Fire and the Sugar Fire; 148 structures destroyed; 23 structures damaged	
Tamarack	Alpine, Mono, Douglas (NV)	68,637	July 4	October 8	Caused by lightning; 25 structures destroyed; 7 structures damaged	
Juniper	Modoc	1,011	July 5	July 13	Unknown cause	
River	Mariposa, Madera	9,656	July 11	July 19	Unknown cause; 12 structures destroyed; 2 structures damaged	
Dexter	Mono	2,965	July 12	July 27	Caused by lightning	
Dixie	Butte, Lassen, Plumas, Shasta, Tehama	963,309	July 13	October 25	Caused by contact between tree and power lines; 1,329 structures destroyed; 95 structures damaged; 1 firefighter fatality; 3 firefighter injuries. Merged with the Fly Fire on July 24. Second-largest wildfire and the largest single (non-complex) wildfire in recorded California history	
Peak	Kern	2,098	July 20	August 12	Unknown cause; 1 structure destroyed	
Fly	Plumas	4,300	July 22	October 25	Unknown cause; merged with the Dixie Fire on July 24	
McFarland	Shasta, Tehama, Trinity	122,653	July 29	September 16	Caused by lightning; 46 structures destroyed; 1 structure damaged; 6 firefighters injured	
Monument	Trinity	223,124	July 30	October 25	Caused by lightning; 52 structures destroyed; 3 structures damaged	
River Complex	Siskiyou, Trinity	199,359	July 30	October 25	Caused by lightning; 122 structures destroyed; 2 structures damaged; consists of 22 fires, of which the largest are the Haypress Fire, the Summer Fire, and the Cronan Fire	
McCash	Siskiyou	94,962	July 31	October 27	Caused by lightning; 1 firefighter fatality	
Tiltill	Tuolumne	2,323	July 31	October 15	Caused by lightning	
Antelope	Siskiyou	145,632	August 1	October 15	Caused by lightning; 18 structures destroyed; 4 structures destroyed	
River	Nevada, Placer	2,619	August 4	August 13	Unknown cause; 142 structures destroyed; 21 structures damaged; 4 injuries	
Caldor	El Dorado, Amador, Alpine	221,835	August 15	October 21	Unknown cause; 1,003 structures destroyed; 81 structures damaged; 5 injuries	
Walkers	Tulare	8,777	August 14	September 18	Caused by lightning	
French	Kern	26,535	August 18	October 19	Human-caused; 49 structures destroyed; 6 structures damaged; 1 firefighter fatality	
South	San Bernardino	819	August 25	September 1	Unknown cause; 17 structures destroyed	
Chaparral	San Diego, Riverside	1,427	August 28	September 9	Unknown cause; 3 structures destroyed	
Knob	Humboldt	2,421	August 29	September 12	Unknown cause	
Windy	Tulare	97,528	September 9	November 15	Caused by lightning; 128 structures destroyed; 4 injuries	
KNP Complex	Tulare	88,307	September 10	December 16	Caused by lightning; includes the Colony Fire and the Paradise Fire; 4 structures destroyed; 1 structure damaged	
Fawn	Shasta	8,578	September 22	October 2	Suspected arson; 185 structures destroyed; 26 structures damaged; 3 injuries	
Alisal	Santa Barbara	16,970	October 11	November 16	Unknown cause; 12 structures destroyed	

== Wildfires listed by month ==
Month	Number of wildfires
January	10
February	0
March	3
April	10
May	24
June	51
July	36
August	27
September	14
October	9
November	1
December	0
Source	Cal Fire incidents 2021

== Gallery of maps ==
Maps of significant wildfires in 2021 in California

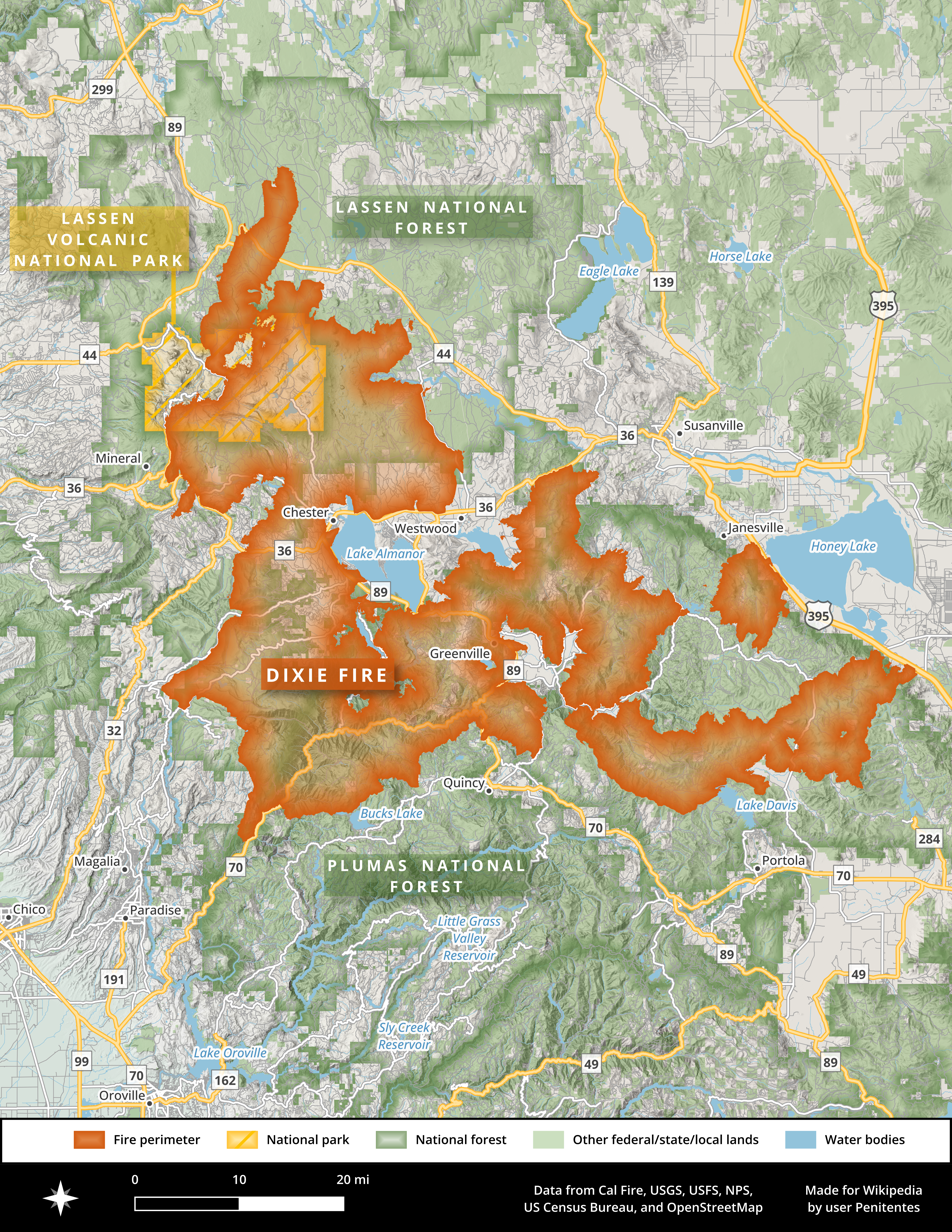
Dixie Fire

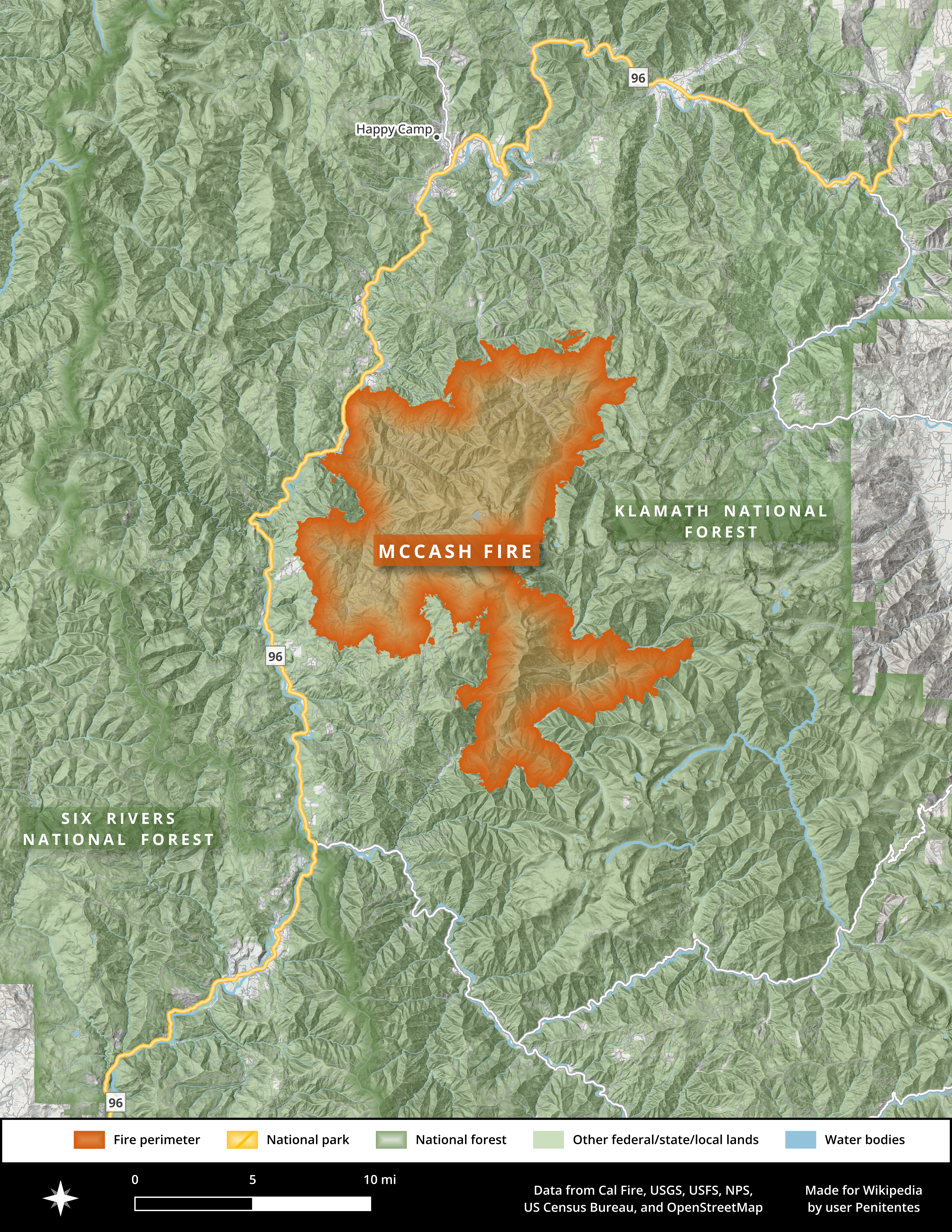
McCash Fire

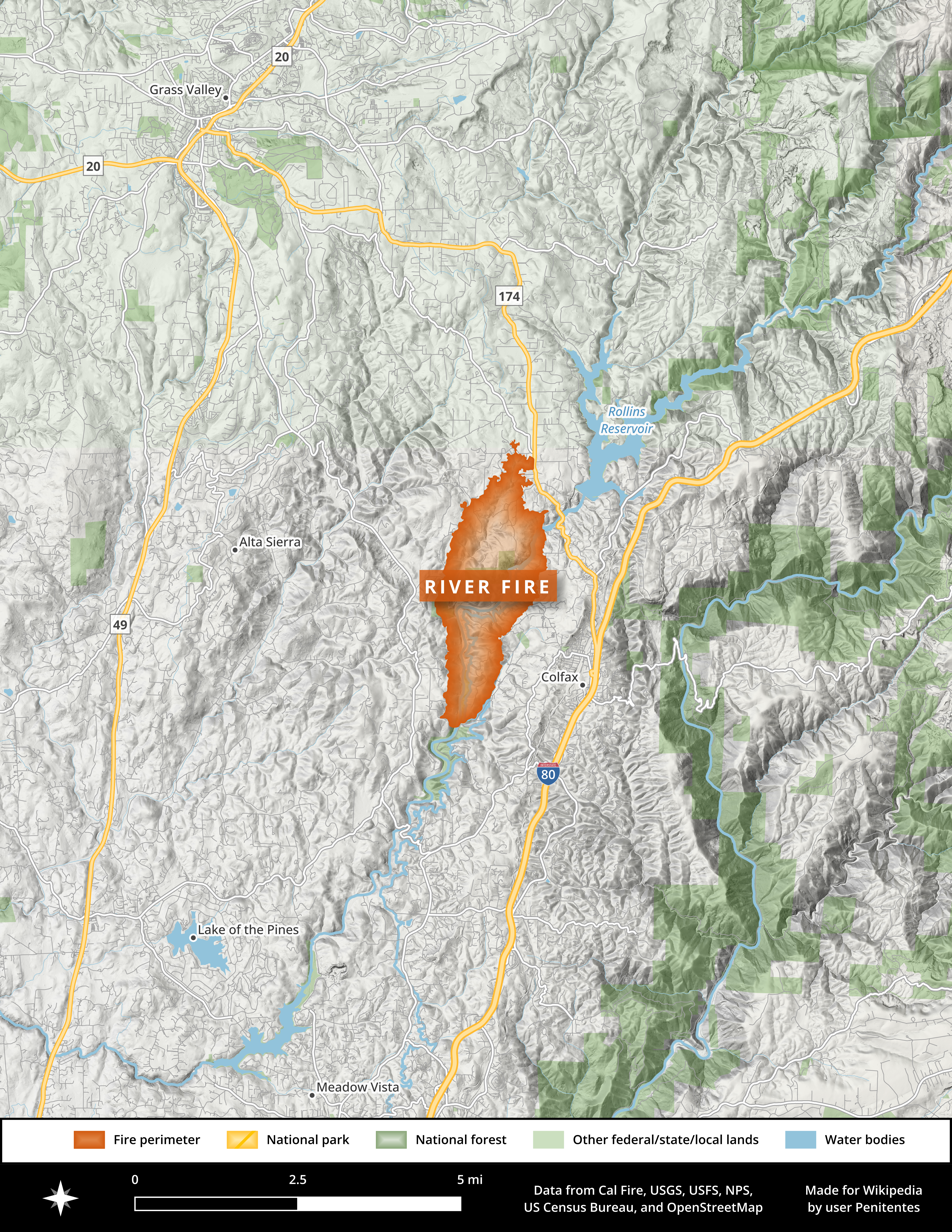
River Fire

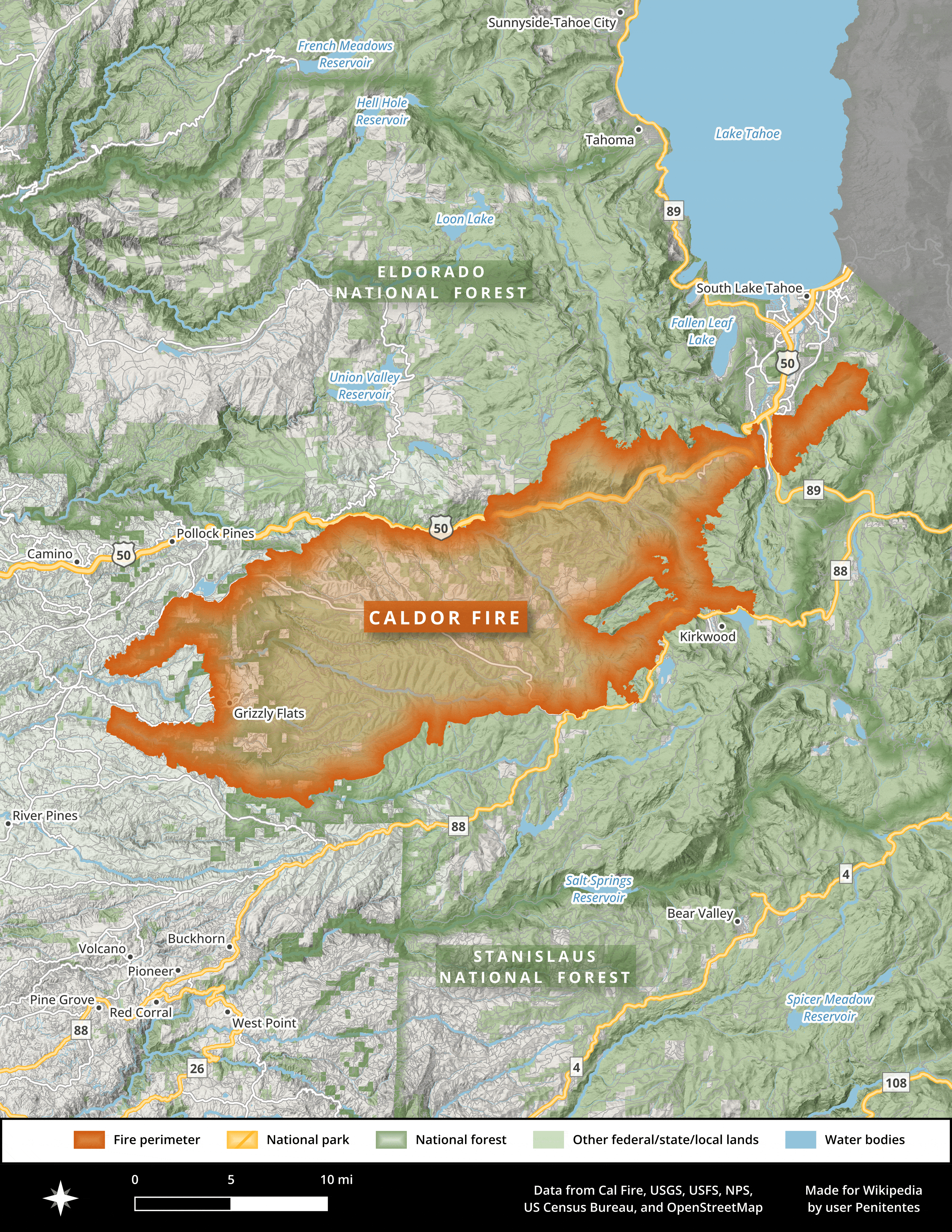
Caldor Fire

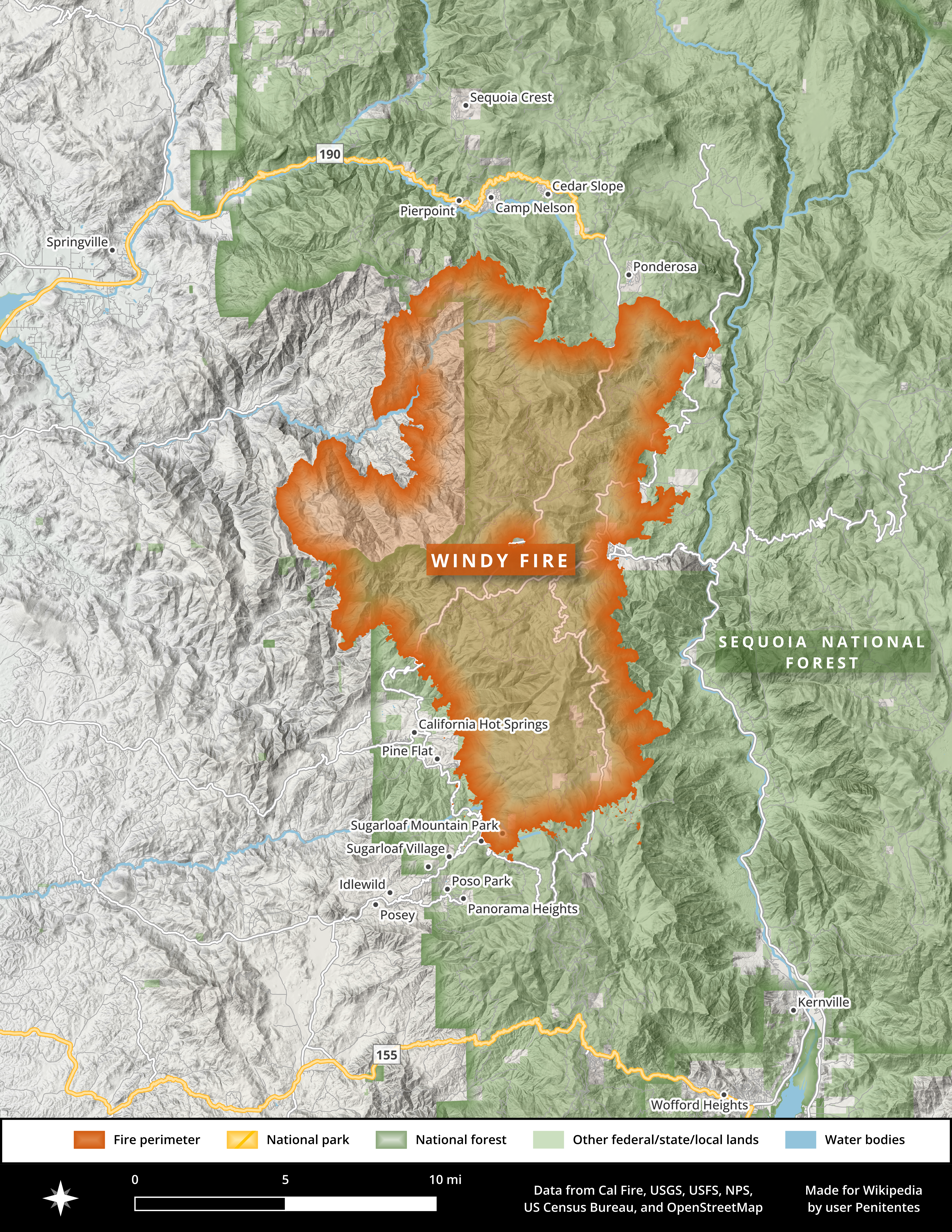
Windy Fire

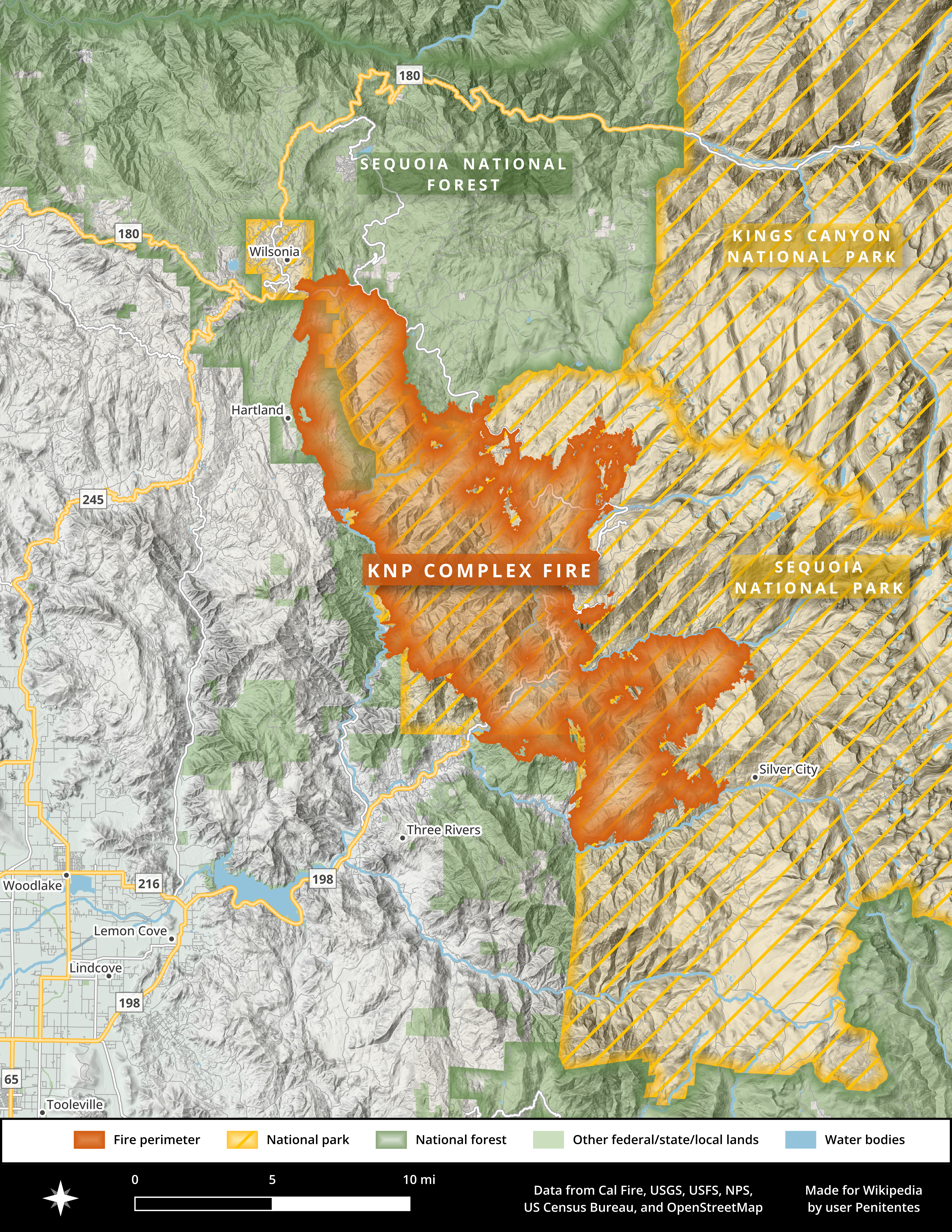
KNP Complex Fire

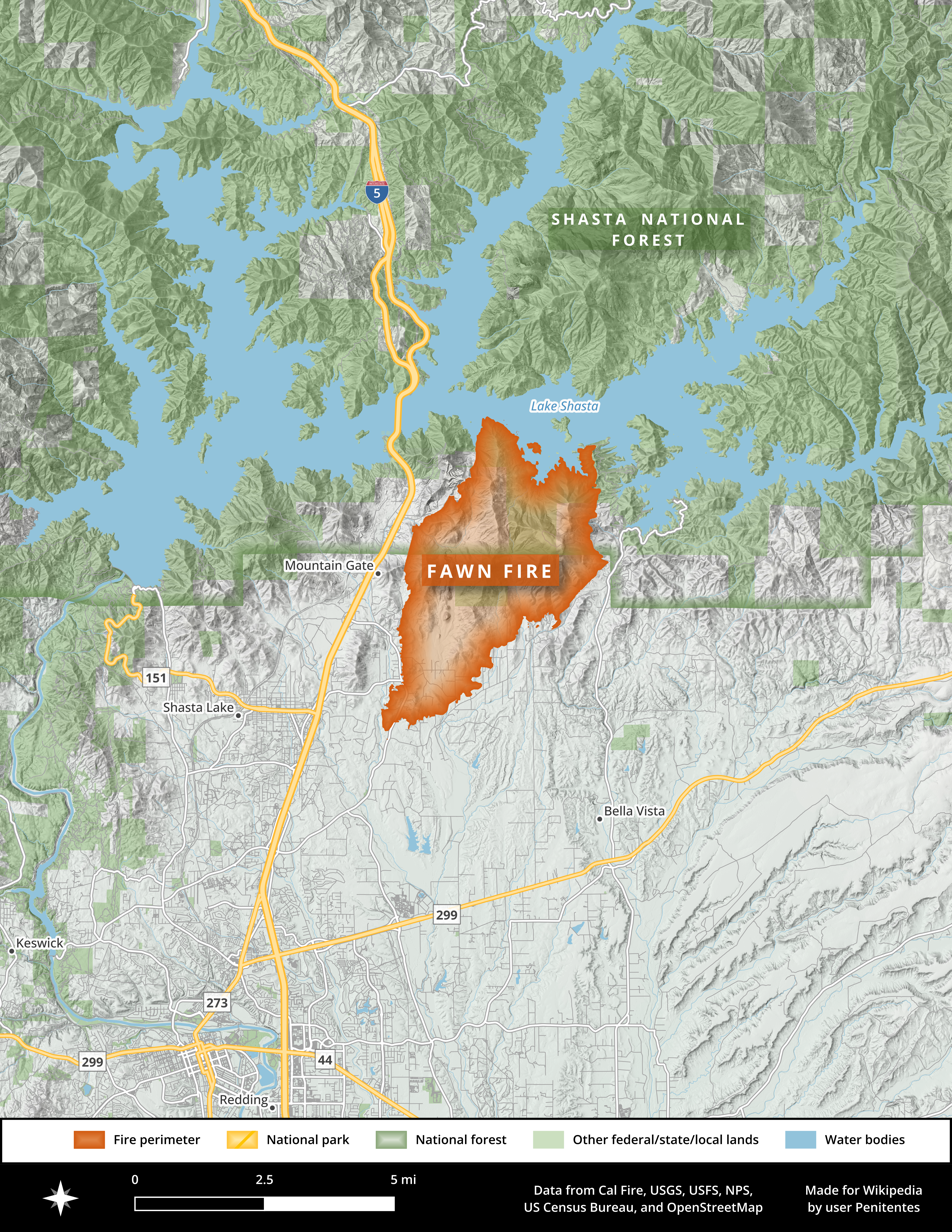
Fawn Fire

== See also ==
- List of California wildfires
