= Willow Fire =

2021 wildfire in Central California

- Part of the 2021 California wildfires
- Date: June 17, 2021 –; July 12, 2021
- Location: Ventana Wilderness, California
- Coordinates: 36.207°N 121.56°W

Statistics
- Burned area: 2,877 acres (1,164 ha)

Ignition
- Cause: Unknown

Map
- Location in Western California

The Willow Fire was a wildfire that burned in the Ventana Wilderness in Monterey County, California, in the United States as part of the 2021 California wildfire season. The fire started on June 17, 2021, burned 2,877 acres (1,164 ha), and was fully contained on July 12, 2021. The cause of the fire is under investigation and is currently unknown.

== Effects ==
The Willow Fire forced evacuations in the areas around Tassajara Road and Arroyo Seco Road in the Ventana Wilderness of the Los Padres National Forest. Various campgrounds, including the China Camp Campground and Arroyo Seco Campground, were forced to close.

The fire threatened the Tassajara Zen Mountain Center, a buddhist monastery located deep in the mountains along the Big Sur coast. Although much of the monastery was evacuated, a number of trained firefighters from the monastery known as "fire monks" stayed behind to help defend the monastery from the fire. The fire monks cleared brush around the monastery and ran a sprinkler system they called "Dharma rain," while also coordinating with local authorities.

== See also ==
- 2021 California wildfires
- List of California wildfires
