= Tennant Fire =

2021 wildfire in Northern California

- Part of the 2021 California wildfires
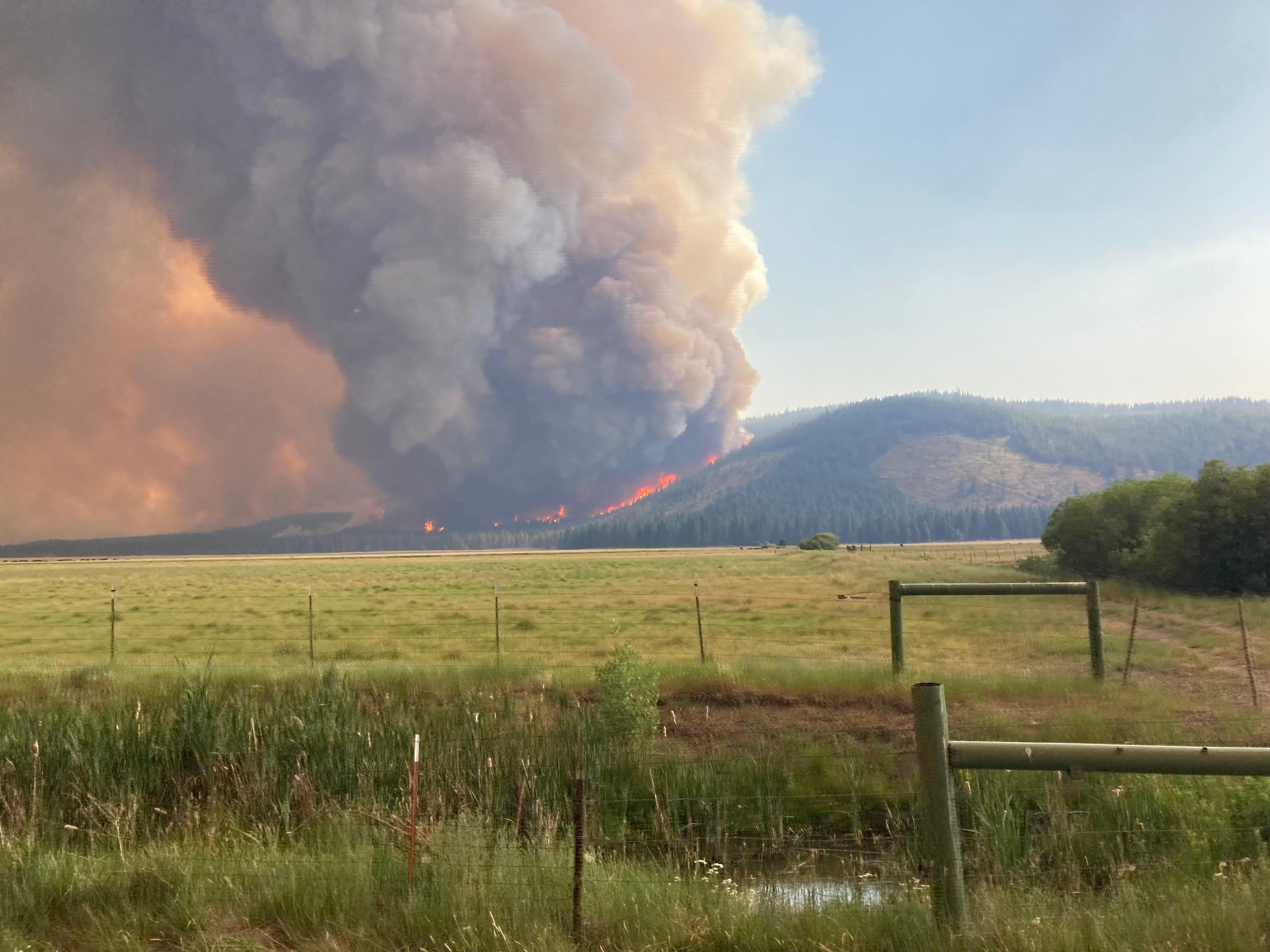
- The Tennant Fire on June 29, 2021
- Date: June 28, 2021 –; July 12, 2021
- Location: Klamath National Forest, Siskiyou County, California, United States
- Coordinates: 41.665°N 122.039°W

Statistics
- Burned area: 10,580 acres (4,282 ha)

Impacts
- Structures destroyed: 5 destroyed

Ignition
- Cause: Under investigation

Map
- Location in California

The Tennant Fire was a wildfire that burned in the Klamath National Forest in Siskiyou County, California, in the United States as part of the 2021 California wildfire season. The fire was first reported just east of Highway 97, three miles northwest of Bray, California on June 28, 2021. The fire was contained on July 12, 2021. The fire burned 10,580 acres (4,282 ha), destroyed five structures, and caused evacuations in Macdoel, California. The cause remains under investigation. The Tennant Fire was one of three fires burning at the same time in the Lake Shasta region, the others being the Lava Fire and the Salt Fire.

== Progression ==
While the cause of the fire remains under investigation, radio scanner traffic reported an automobile traveling along Tennant Road caught fire and spread fire to nearby wildland.

=== June ===
The Tennant Fire was first reported burning on Tennant Road around 4 PM on June 28, 2021, just east of Highway 97, three miles northwest of Bray, California, in the Klamath National Forest in Siskiyou County, California. Emergency responder radio scanner feeds reported that the fire may have started when a car fire spread to nearby vegetation. By the next morning, June 29, the fire had burned 1,700 acres (688 ha) and was five percent contained. The fire was burning rapidly in dry brush and flammable young timber. By the afternoon, a mandatory evacuation order was put in place for portions of the Macdoel area east of Highway 97 to E. Ball Mountain Road and from Bray to Old State Highway. A portion of Highway 97 was also closed from Dorris to Weed. By the end of the day, the Tennant Fire had grown to 6,000 acres (2,428 ha).

By the morning of June 30, the fire had burned almost 9,500 acres (3,845 ha), was six percent contained, and had destroyed five structures, two of which were homes. New evacuation orders were put in place for additional areas of the Macdoel area, as the fire grew, threatening 300 homes.

=== July ===
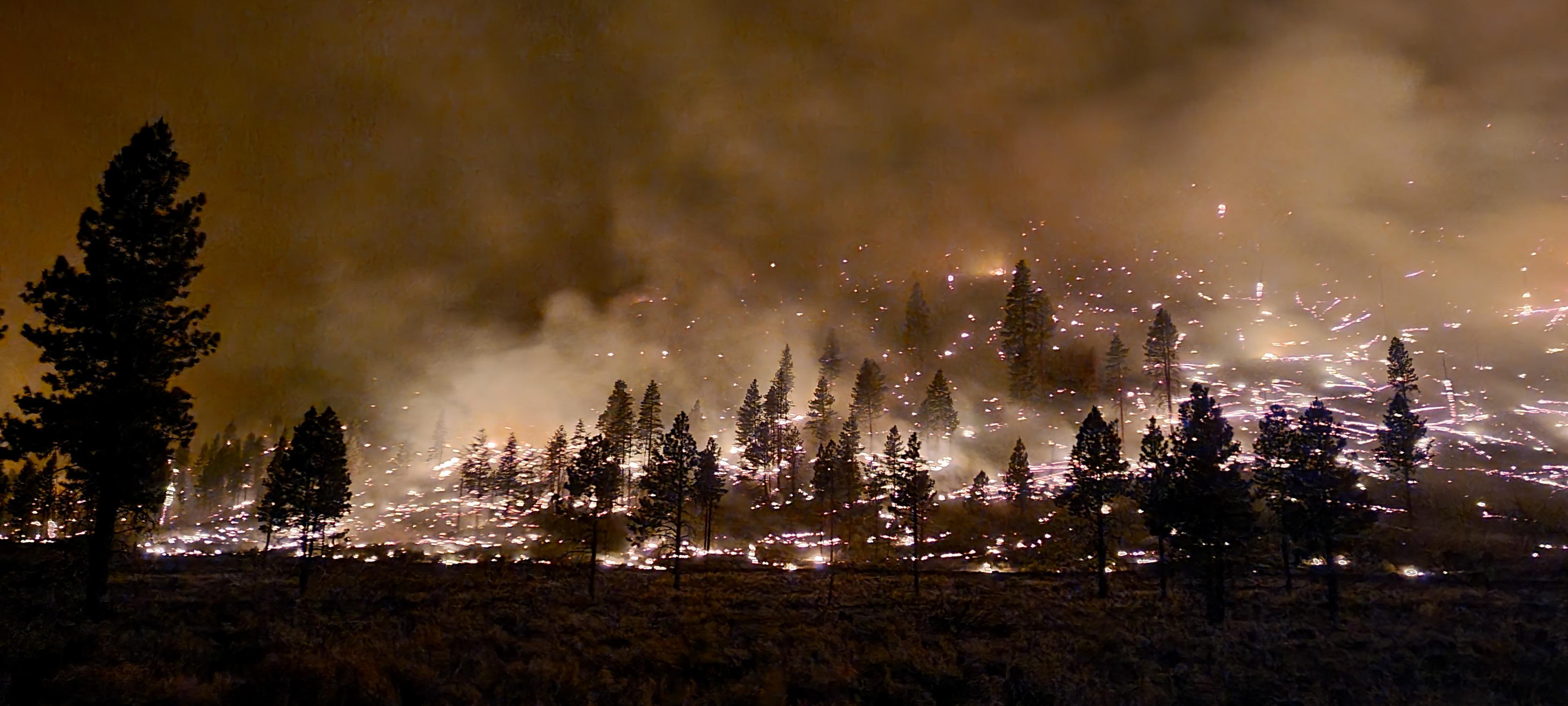
Nighttime firing operations on the Tennant Fire on July 3, 2021.

The Tennant Fire had burned over 10,000 acres (4,047 ha) and was 17 percent contained by July 3. A heat advisory was also in effect for the area, through July 4, leading to concerns about increased fire activity. The fire's eastern flank remained a priority area, with concerns about the fire moving easterly towards Bray, Tennant, Mt. Shasta Woods, Juanita Lake and Shafter Campground.

As of Monday, July 5, the fire was 51 percent contained, with full containment being expected by July 31, according to the United States Forest Service. Controlled burns on the eastern flank helped keep the fire in check, lessen threats to local communities, and increase containment. This resulted in the reopening of the Highway 97 corridor that evening. At this point, the fire also began burning in the burn scar of the 2009 Tennant Fire. Cooler weather helped to increase containment, which grew to 89 percent by Thursday, July 8.

The Tennant Fire was 100 percent contained by July 12 and evacuation orders were lifted. The fire burned a total of 10,580 acres (4,282 ha).

== Effects ==
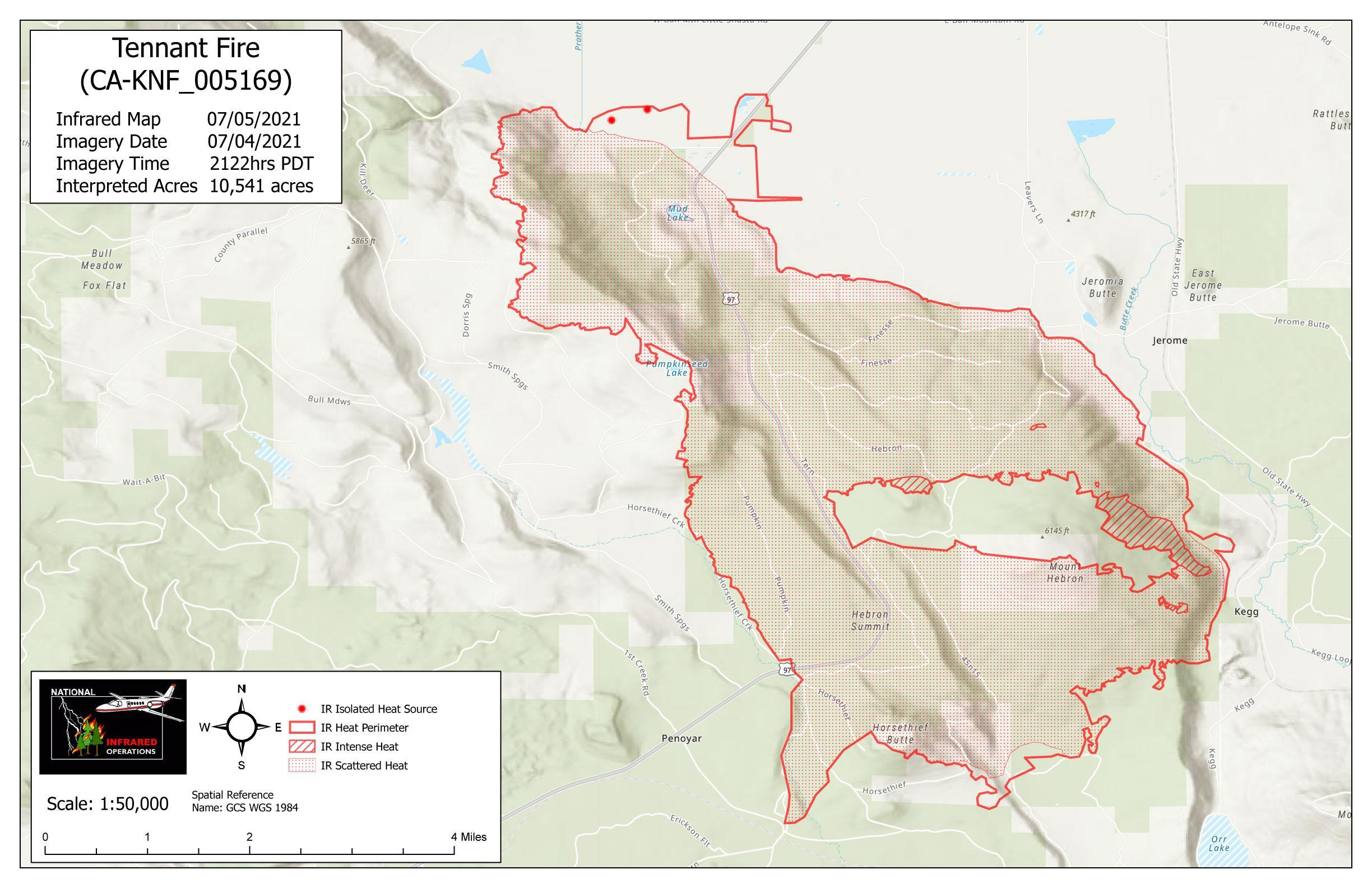
Infrared map of the Tennant Fire on July 5, 2021.

=== Evacuations and closures ===
The Tennant Fire resulted in the evacuation of residents and businesses in portions of Macdoel, California starting June 29. Dorris City Hall served as an evacuation center. Evacuations lasted fourteen days. The fire also resulted in the closure of the Highway 97 corridor from Dorris to Weed for seven days.

=== Infrastructure ===
The fire threatened 300 homes and destroyed five structures, including two homes. The Tennant Fire also threatened railway lines along the Highway 97 corridor.

=== Environmental ===
The Tennant Fire impacted air quality in northern California and portions of Oregon. Klamath Falls and Lakeview, Oregon, implemented a five air quality advisory due to the smoke.

The post-fire Burned Area Emergency Response (BAER) evaluation reported that approximately 55 percent of the 11,513 acres (4,659 ha) evaluated were unburned or had low soil burn severity, meaning only partial consumption of fine fuels took place during the fire and litter coverage remains relatively intact. Additionally, plant root systems and structures are undamaged, therefore, recovery time will be short-term. Of that same acreage, 39 percent had moderate soil burn severity, meaning trees and some shrubs did suffer burn damage and will take time to recover. The land could also suffer from water repellent conditions, specifically run off. Finally, 6 percent suffered from high soil burn severity, meaning the land experienced intense fire and that recovery time for conifers will be considerably long.

=== Cultural ===
The fire burned much of the remaining wood at the Cookhouse Cultural Site, a historic cookhouse located at a former sawmill. The cookhouse was already deteriorating before the fire. Much of the structure had already collapsed pre-fire. According to archeologists examining the cultural site after the Tennant Fire, the site is still of historic value. However, the artifacts and deposits that remain are fragile and vulnerable to further environmental impacts.
