= River of Fire =

River of Fire may refer to:

== Literature ==
- Le Fleuve de feu (The River of Fire, tr. 1954), 1923 French novel by François Mauriac
- Aag Ka Darya, English title of the 1959 landmark historical novel by Qurratulain Hyder
- River of Fire, a 1993 novel in the Stormrider series by Victor Milán with the pen name Robert Baron
- River of Fire, a 1996 novel in the Fallen Angels series by Mary Jo Putney
- River of Fire, River of Water, 1998 book on Buddhism by Taitetsu Unno
- River of Fire: The Clydebank Blitz, 2010 book by John Macleod about the World War II Clydebank Blitz bombing raids on Clydebank, Scotland
- River of Fire and Other Stories, 2012 English translation of short stories by Korean writer Oh Jung-hee
- "River of Fire" (《火河》), 2015 short story by Chinese-Australian writer Mister Slow of Joondalup, published in English in The Stinging Fly in 2023 in a translation by Freya Tong
- River of Fire, a 2018 novel in the Warriors: A Vision of Shadows series by Erin Hunter
- River of Fire: The Rattlesnake Fire and the Mission Boys, a 2018 book about the 1953 Rattlesnake Fire in northern California by John Maclean
- River of Fire: My Spiritual Journey, a 2019 memoir by Helen Prejean

== Film and television ==
- Aag Ka Dariya (English: River of Fire), a 1953 Indian Hindi-language film directed by Roop K. Shorey
- River of Fire, the third chapter in the 1941 American film serial Jungle Girl
- River of Fire, the first chapter in the 1951 American film serial Government Agents vs. Phantom Legion
- Bor Plerng Tee Pho Talee (English: River of Fire), a 1990 Thai film directed by Panna Rittikrai
- "River of Fire", a season 2 episode of Chūka Ichiban!

== Music ==
- "River of Fire", by Bif Naked from The Promise (2009)
- River of Fire, 1983 chamber music by Brian Cherney
- "River of Fire", a song by In This Moment from Ritual (2017)
- "River of Fire", 1992 single by Stan Meissner

== See also ==
- Ndocciata, a Christmas festival in Molise, southern Italy, with a parade of burning torches
- Phlegethon, a river in the ancient Greek underworld, sometimes translated as the "river of fire"
- Richibucto River, (lit. "river of fire" in the Mi'kmaq language) a river in eastern New Brunswick, Canada
- River fire (disambiguation)
