= French Fire (2021) =

2021 wildfire in California

- Part of the 2021 California wildfires
- Date: August 18, 2021 –; October 24, 2021
- Location: Lake Isabella, Kern County, California
- Coordinates: 35.687°N 118.55°W

Statistics
- Burned area: 26,535 acres (10,738 ha)

Impacts
- Deaths: 1 firefighter (non related)
- Structures lost: 18

Map
- Location in Central California

Location of French Fire

The French Fire was a wildfire that burned 26,535 acres (10,738 ha) near Shirley Meadows west of Lake Isabella in Kern County, California in the United States during the 2021 California wildfire season. The fire was initially reported on Wednesday, August 18, 2021, and ended around October 24, 2021. The fire threatened the communities of Shirley Meadows, Alta Sierra and Wofford Heights. The fire reportedly destroyed some 18 structures, including 9 residences. The fire was determined, as of September 13, 2021, to have been human-caused and suspicious in nature.

== Progression ==
The fire ignited shortly after 4:15 pm PST near Wagy Flat and Sawmill Road in an unincorporated area west of Isabella Highlands shortly before threatening it and the surrounding rural communities. Before 6 pm, the fire had reportedly burned 50 acres and was noted to be progressing at a rapid to critical rate of spread which lead to the reported acreage quickly ballooning to 900 acres by 7:34 pm. By 9:16 pm that night, the Kern County Fire Department had reported the fire at 2,155 acres in size with 0% containment and still burning aggressively in all directions due to the shifting winds.

The following day of Thursday, August 19, the fire continued to spread aggressively as the shifting winds pushed the fireline westward as the eastern portion of flames had moved into the 2,545 acres Shirley Fire burn scar of June 2014, slowing its eastern progression. On Friday, August 20, significant fire growth has caused the destruction of several properties in the Alta Sierra community. By Saturday, August 21, the fire had grown to 11,295 acres as resources became increasingly strained due to many being committed to other major conflagrations in the state during the season. As of Saturday morning, officials said the east and southeast winds pushed the fire to the Shirley Peak area where it gained significant growth as resources were sent to Alta Sierra to keep the fire from further destroying the community. By Sunday, August 22, the fire was 13,341 acres in size and was 10% contained as 846 fire fighting personnel were now engaging the fire. No firefighters were killed by the wildfires, but during extinguishing operations, one firefighter died of COVID-19.

== Effects ==
=== Closures and evacuations ===
In the initial eastward progression of the fire towards Lake Isabella, mandatory evacuation orders were placed for residents living along Wagy Flat Road between Old State Road south to Keysville. Additionally, residents of Wofford Heights, Rancheria Road east to Wofford Boulevard between Highway 155 and south to Old State Road were ordered to evacuate. The Red Cross set up an evacuation center at Kern River Valley Senior Center, 6403 Lake Isabella Road but was later moved to Woodrow Wallace Elementary School at 3240 Erskine Creek Road in Lake Isabella. Later in the week, evacuations where ordered for the small forest community of Alta Sierra. By Monday evening, August 23, the French Fire has forced the evacuation of approximately 2,145 residents in several communities surrounding the fire area.

=== Damage ===
As of September 13, 2021, the French Fire has destroyed 18 structures which included 9 residential structures.

== See also ==
- 2021 California wildfires
