= Minnipuka, Ontario =

Minnipuka
- Dispersed Rural Community
- Location in Ontario
- Coordinates: 48°54′07″N 83°50′26″W
- Country: Canada
- Province: Ontario
- District: Algoma
- Geographic township: Marjorie
- Elevation: 337 m (1,106 ft)
- Time zone: UTC-5 (Eastern Time Zone)
  - Summer (DST): UTC-4 (Eastern Time Zone)
- Postal Code FSA: P0M

Minnipuka is an unincorporated place and Dispersed Rural Community in geographic Marjorie Township, in the Unorganized North part of Algoma District in northeastern Ontario, Canada. It is on the Canadian National Railway transcontinental railway main line between the railway points of Neswabin to the west and Dishnish to the east, has a passing track, and is passed but not served by Via Rail transcontinental Canadian passenger trains. The place is on the east side of Minnipuka Lake, part of the Goat River system.

Geographic Minnipuka Township is the township adjacent diagonally to the northeast of Marjorie Township.

== History ==
Minnipuka is part of a section of what was originally the Canadian Northern Railway that was under construction from 1912 to 1913.
