= Little Fire River =

- Location of the mouth of the Little Fire River in Ontario

Location
- Country: Canada
- Province: Ontario
- Region: Northeastern Ontario
- District: Algoma
- Geographic township: Moorehouse

Physical characteristics
- Source: Unnamed Lake
  - coordinates: 48°39′23″N 84°03′07″W
  - elevation: 397 m (1,302 ft)
- Mouth: Nameibin Lake
  - coordinates: 48°38′21″N 84°02′19″W
  - elevation: 395 m (1,296 ft)

Basin features
- River system: James Bay drainage basin

The Little Fire River is a river in geographic Moorehouse Township, Algoma District in northeastern Ontario, Canada. It is in the James Bay drainage basin, and is a tributary of the Fire River.

The river begins at an unnamed lake. Though the outflow is in geographic Moorehouse Township, the lake extends north into geographic Martin Township. The river flows south into Little Fire Lake, then east into Nameibin Lake, the source of the Fire River. The Fire River flows via the Missinaibi River and the Moose River to James Bay.

The river is entirely within the Chapleau Crown Game Preserve.

== Sources ==
- Map 14 (PDF) (Map). 1 : 1,600,000. Official road map of Ontario. Ministry of Transportation of Ontario. 2010-01-01.
- Restructured municipalities - Ontario map #3 (Map). Restructuring Maps of Ontario. Ontario Ministry of Municipal Affairs and Housing. 2006.
