= McFarland Fire =

2021 wildfire in Northern California

- Part of the 2021 California wildfires
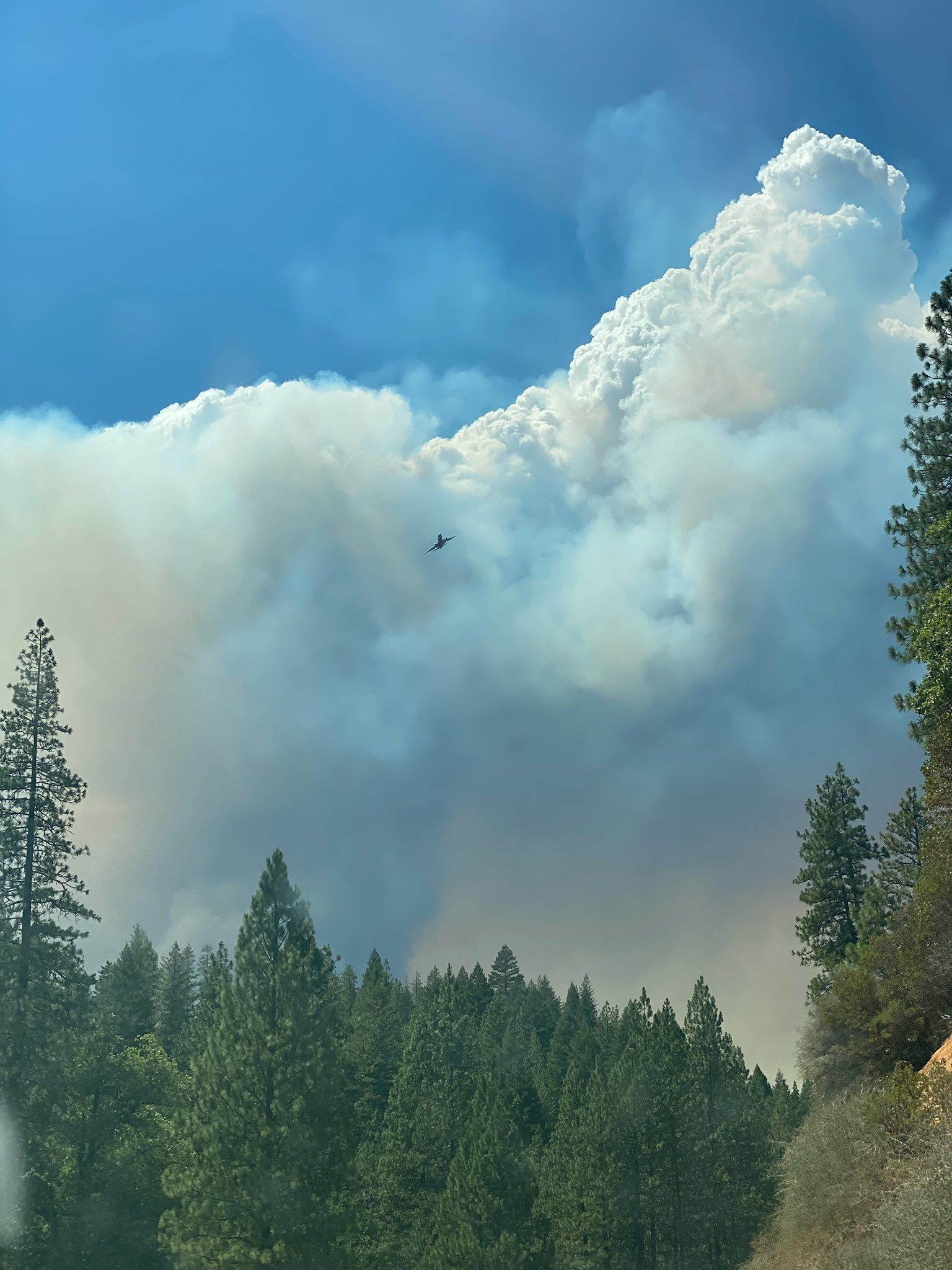
- The McFarland Fire on August 2, 2021
- Date: July 29, 2021 –; September 16, 2021
- Location: Shasta-Trinity National Forest, Shasta County and Trinity County, California, United States
- Coordinates: 40.35°N 123.034°W

Statistics
- Burned area: 122,653 acres (49,636 ha)

Impacts
- Injuries: 6
- Structures destroyed: 46

Ignition
- Cause: Lightning strike

Map
- Location in California

The McFarland Fire was a very large wildfire that burned in the Shasta-Trinity National Forest north of Wildwood in Trinity County, Shasta County, and Tehama County, California in the United States. Started by a lightning strike, the fire was first reported on July 29, 2021 on McFarland Ridge south of Highway 36. As of September 16, 2021, the fire had burned 122,653 acres (49,636 ha) and destroyed 46 structures.

== Progression ==
=== July ===
The McFarland Fire was first reported as burning on McFarland Ridge, south of Highway 36 in Shasta-Trinity National Forest in Trinity County, California, around 6:45 PM on July 29, 2021. Due to the fire's close proximity to Highway 36, fire crews began immediately building firelines to specifically protect the corridor. Red Flag Warnings were put in place for the weekend with potential to aid the fire's growth. On Sunday, July 30, Wildwood was placed under mandatory evacuation. An evacuation center was opened in Hayfork.

=== August ===
Fueled by Red Flag winds, dry conditions, and timber, chaparral, and timber litter, the fire grew to 3,200 acres (1,295 ha) by the morning of August 1. By the following morning, August 2, the fire was over 7,400 acres (2,995 ha). High winds caused the fire to spot up to three miles away from the main fire. However, fire crews had successfully contained five percent of the fire. The evacuation center in Hayfork was moved to a church in Weaverville. By August 3, the south side of the fire crossed Hayfork Creek and was burning in both Trinity and Shasta Counties. On the east side, residents and commercial structures are threatened. Crews worried that spot fires appear over Highway 36, however, the crews were able to hold the fire from crossing the highway. As a result of these concerns, evacuation warnings were put in place for Post Mountain, Trinity Pines, Shields Road, White Rock Road, and portions of Harrison Gulch.

By August 4, the fire continued to grow, fueled by dry vegetation. The southern part of the fire began burning towards the August Complex fire. On August 5, the Platina area was placed under evacuation warning. Smoke from the fire was carried into the Sacramento Valley and San Francisco Bay Area starting July 6. Six handcrew members were injured while working a spot fire on August 6, sustaining burns. On August 7, it was confirmed that the fire had destroyed four structures. The fire started spreading southeast, burning on the north slope of North Star Mountain. Heavy smoke from the fire caused air support to be suspended. That same day, the Forest Service announced that portions of Shasta-Trinity National Forest would be closed through October.

As of August 7, the fire had grown to 30,093 acres (12,178 ha) and was 21 percent contained. On August 16, strong west-northwest winds pushed the fire into Tehama County, adding an additional 40,000 acres over the course of the next two days. The fire sustained slow, but steady growth until August 27, when it hit 93% containment.

=== September ===
Minimal fire activity continued while crews worked to fully contain the fire. On September 16, the McFarland Fire was 100% contained.

== Effects ==
=== Environmental ===
Smoke from the McFarland Fire impacted the air quality in Hayfork, Yolla Bolla Middle Eel Wilderness, Sacramento Valley and the San Francisco Bay Area. In Platina, California, the smoke was so thick that the visibility was fifty feet.

=== Recreational ===
The impact of the fire resulted in the closure of portions of Shasta-Trinity National Forest for almost three months.
