= River Complex 2021 fires =

2021 wildfire in Northern California

River Complex (2021)
- Part of the 2021 California wildfires
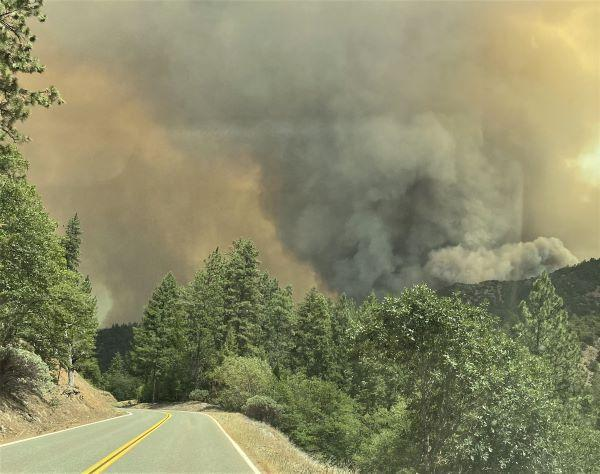
- The Haypress Fire on August 2, 2021
- Date: July 30, 2021 –; October 25, 2021
- Location: Klamath National Forest, Siskiyou County, California, U.S.
- Coordinates: 41.143°N 123.018°W

Statistics
- Burned area: 199,343 acres 311 square miles807 square kilometres80,671 hectares

Ignition
- Cause: Lightning strike

Map
- Location in Northern California

The River Complex 2021 was a wildfire complex burning in Klamath National Forest in Siskiyou County, California in the United States. The complex comprises over 20 wildfires that started as a result of lightning strikes during a series of thunderstorms in late July 2021. As of 25 October 2021, the fire had burned a total of 199,343 acres (80,671 ha) and became 100% contained. The largest fires in the complex were the Haypress–Summer Fire (183,145 acres (74,116 ha)) and the Cronan Fire (5,940 acres (2,404 ha)).

== Progression ==
=== July ===
A series of late July thunderstorms created lightning strikes that, over a series of days, started 29 wildfires on the western side of Klamath National Forest in Siskiyou County, California. Twenty-five of those fires started in the Salmon-Scott River Ranger District, resulting in the creation of the River Complex to manage the fires. The first fire was reported on July 30, 2021, around 7:00 AM, burning in timber and brush. The largest fire, as of July 31, was the Cronan Fire, burning 3.5 miles northeast of Sawyers Bar. At the time, it was reported to have burned 20 acres (8 ha). Five of the 25 fires were contained and two were declared "out" by fire crews, including the Bally Fire near Buckhorn Bally Lookout and the Lime Fire near Lime Gulch. On Saturday, July 31, two more fires were reported: a .25 acre fire (Glade Fire) on Sterling Mountain and a tree fire in the Slater Fire burn scar.

=== August ===
By August 2, a more robust evaluation of the fires burning in the Complex was available. Thirteen fires remained actively burning, including the three largest fires:

- Haypress Fire at 600 acres (243 ha) burning two miles southeast of Shadow Creek Campground. This fire caused the evacuations of Taylor Creek and warnings to be put in place for Forks of Salmon and Sawyers Bar.
- Summer Fire at 200 acres (81 ha) burning east of China Gulch Trailhead, near Cecil Lake. This resulted in the evacuation of the trail and immediate area and an evacuation center being opened in Etna, California.
- Cronan Fire at 150 acres (61 ha) burning 3.5 miles from Sawyers Bar in Cronan Gulch.

Smokejumpers were brought in to tackle fires in remote areas, including the 20 acres (8 ha) Packers Fire burning on Packers Peak in the Trinity Alps Wilderness and the 3 acres (1 ha) Island Fire near Lake of the Island in Marble Mountain Wilderness. The next day, on August 3, evacuations were put in place for Cecilville and Caribou Road. Evacuation warnings were put in place for areas surrounding Cecilville. Limited firefighting resources, due to other larger fires burning in the region, resulted in smaller fires being left to burn out and a focus on structure protection. The number of fires in the complex was increased to 22. The majority of the fires were .5 to 20 acres (8 ha) in size and 13 were contained. By the evening of August 6, the Haypress Fire grew to 13,500 acres (5,463 ha), the Summer Fire was 6,611 acres (2,675 ha) and the Cronan Fire was 662 acres (268 ha). The entire complex totaled 29,783 acres (12,053 ha) and was three percent contained. Additional evacuation orders were put in place for Summerville and Petersburg. A portion of Callahan-Cecilville Road was closed.

== Effects ==
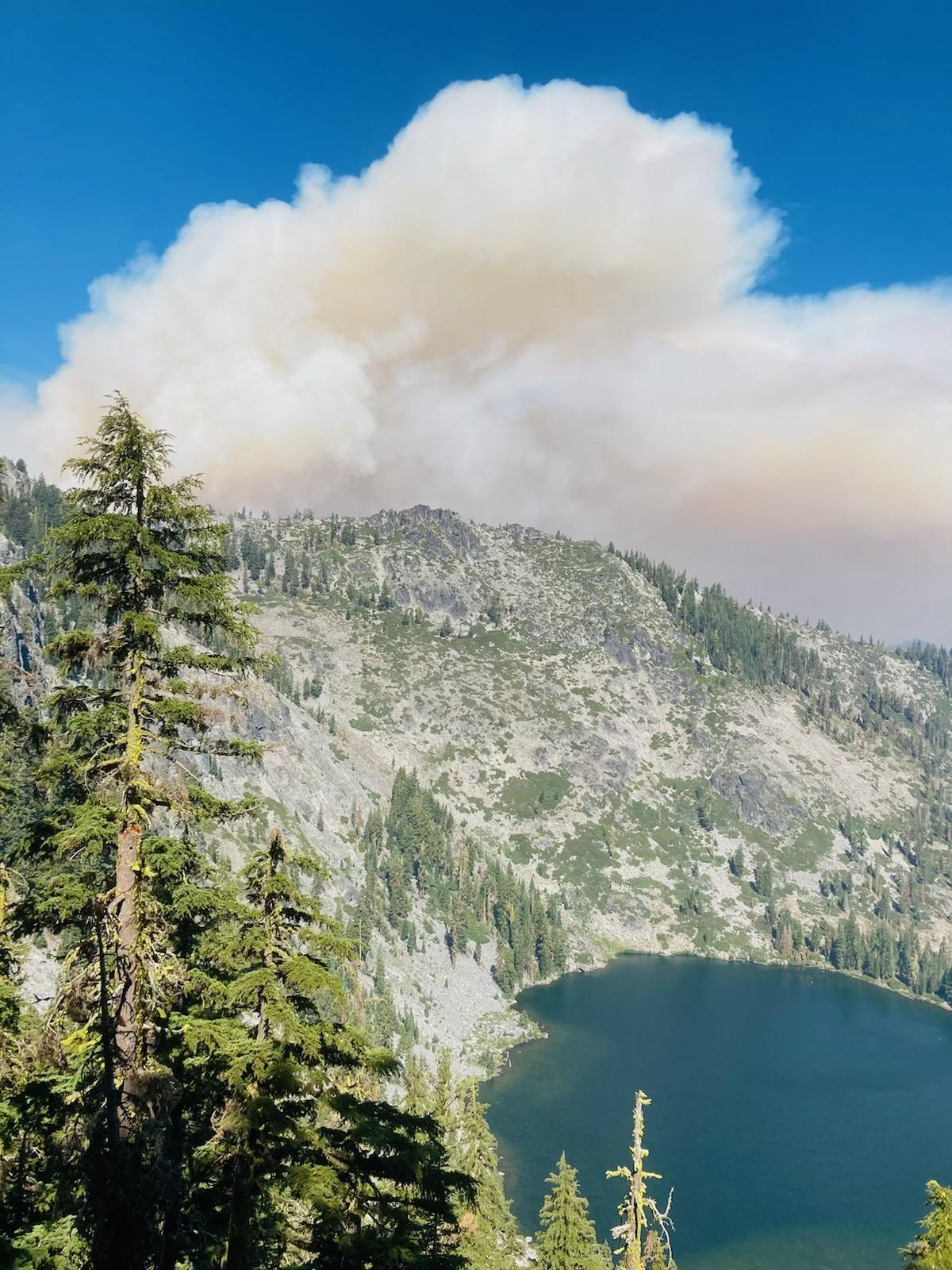
The Haypress Fire, as seen from the Trail Gulch Lake.

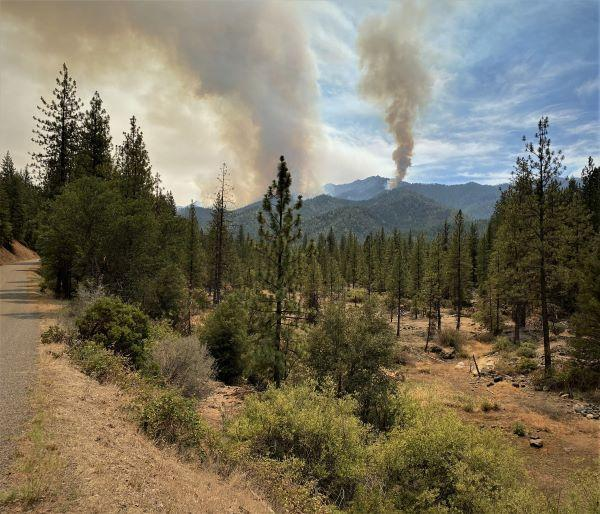
The Summer Fire on August 2, 2021.

Smoke from the River Complex impacted air quality in the San Francisco Bay Area from August 6 through August 8. The air quality levels prompted an air quality advisory for the area.

The Summer Fire resulted in an evacuation of the entire China Gulch Trailhead and a closure of the trail on August 2.

=== Evacuations ===
The following areas were under mandatory evacuation:

- Caribou Road
- Cecilville
- Petersburg
- Summerville
- Taylor Creek Road

The following areas were under evacuation warning:

- Black Bear
- Blue Ridge
- Eddy Gulch Road
- Forks of Salmon
- Godfried
- Sawyers Bar
- Uncle Sam Mine

An evacuation center was at Etna Fire Hall in Etna, California.

=== Road closures ===
The following roads were closed:

- Callahan-Cecilville Road was closed from approximately 1 mile west of the community of Callahan to Cecilville.

=== Recreational closures ===
The following areas were closed:

- China Gulch Trailhead
