= River Fire (2021) =

2021 wildfire in Northern California

- Part of the 2021 California wildfires
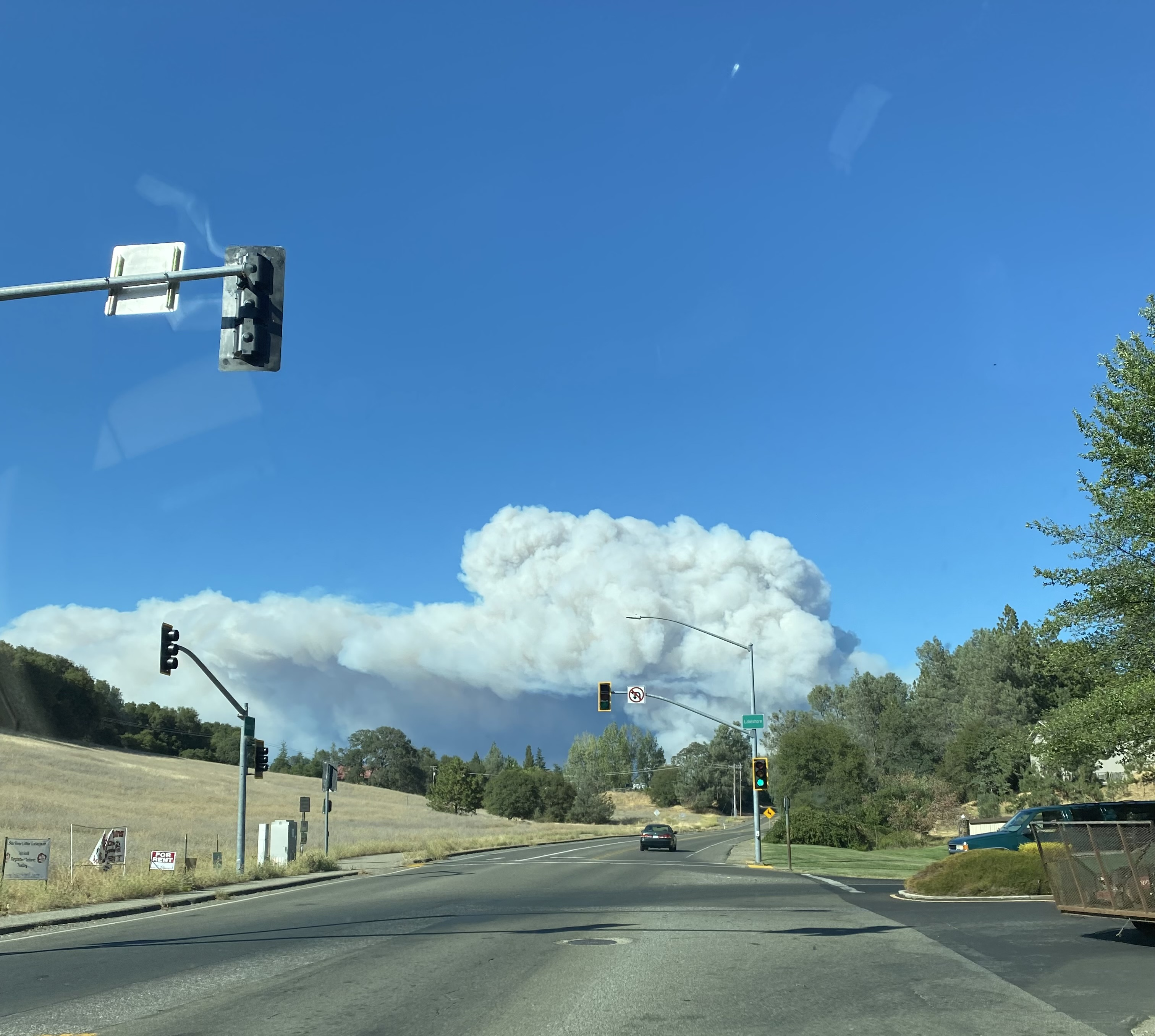
- Smoke column rising from the River Fire at roughly 5:00 p.m. on August 4, 2021
- Date: August 4, 2021 –; August 13, 2021
- Location: Placer County and Nevada County, Northern California
- Coordinates: 39.088°N 121.015°W

Statistics
- Burned area: 2,619 acres (1,060 ha; 4 sq mi; 11 km^{2})

Impacts
- Injuries: 4
- Evacuated: >7,000
- Structures lost: 142

Ignition
- Cause: Human-caused

Map
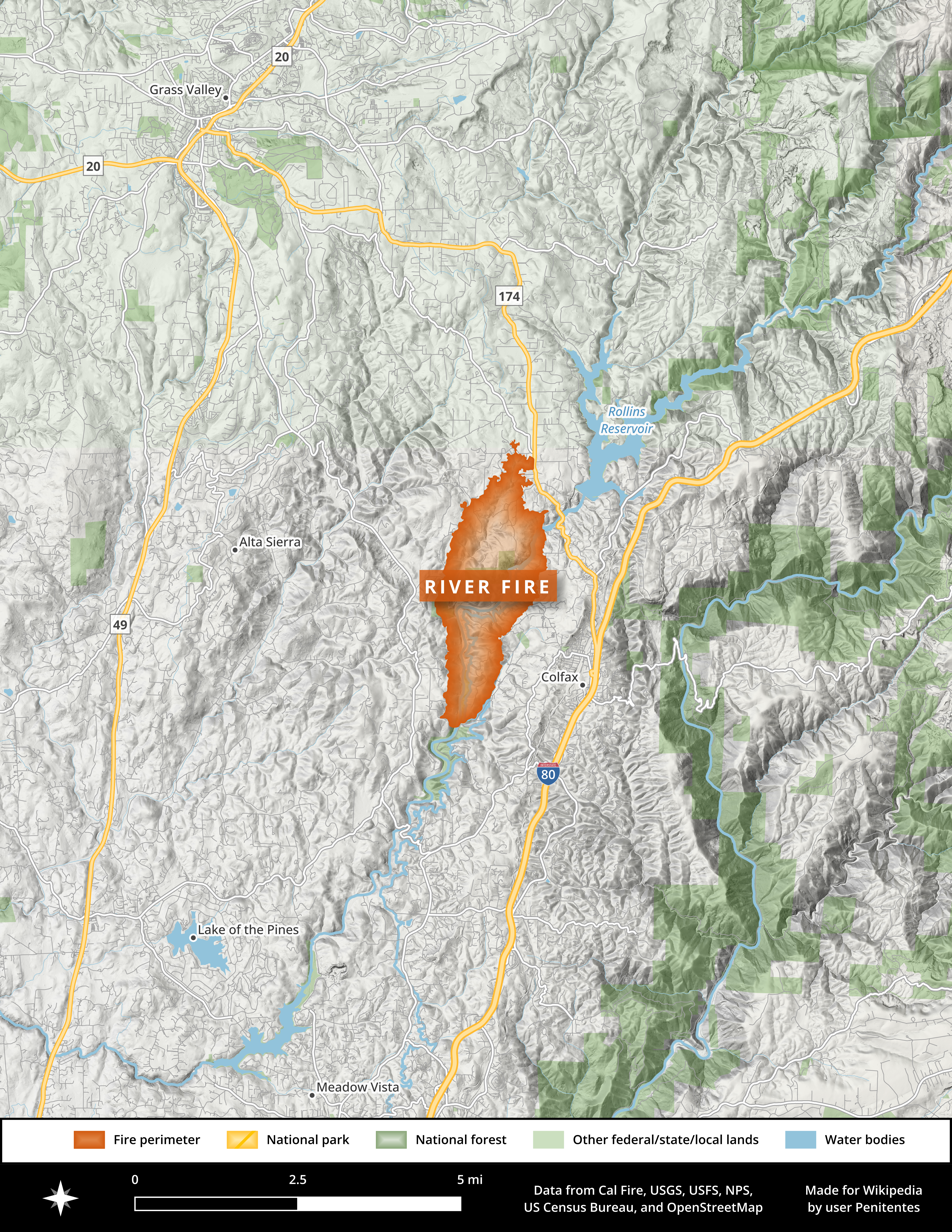
- The River Fire burned just to the west of Colfax and the Interstate 80 corridor

- The general location of the River Fire in Northern California

The River Fire was a destructive 2021 wildfire that burned 2,619 acres (1,060 ha) near Colfax in Nevada County and Placer County, California. The fire broke out on August 4, 2021, and burned 2,619 acres (1,060 ha) before it was fully contained on August 13, 2021. The River Fire destroyed 142 structures, damaged 21 more, and resulted in four injuries to firefighters and civilians. It was the fifth most destructive fire of California's 2021 wildfire season. The exact cause of the fire is unknown, but it was determined to have been of human origin by investigators who traced the ignition to a campground by the Bear River west of Colfax.

== Background ==
Increasing wildfire risk caused the California Department of Forestry and Fire Protection (Cal Fire) to suspend all outdoor residential burn permits in Yuba, Nevada, and Placer counties beginning on May 24, 2021. Before the fire started, the National Weather Service issued a red flag warning for much of northeastern California between August 4 and August 5, forecasting gusty winds and low humidity.

== Progression ==
On Wednesday, August 4, 2021, at approximately 1:59 p.m. PDT, the River Fire started in brush alongside the Bear River in the overnight camping area of Bear River Campground in Placer County. The fire quickly jumped the river into Nevada County, and expanded up along the river drainage towards the northeast, pushed by prevailing winds. Extreme fire behavior was reported, including flame lengths of 50 to 60 feet, a rapid rate of spread, and long-range spotting. At points the fire produced a pyrocumulus cloud.

Many aerial attack assets were committed to the fire in an effort to halt its progress and protect structures and lives. At one point up to 24 aircraft and helicopters were engaged on the incident.

Fire behavior moderated in the evening as the fire reached sparser fuels in the area of Chicago Park. By the end of the day the fire was assessed at 1,400 acres, which was revised to 2,400 acres the following morning. The fire experienced little major growth overnight or in the following days, with firefighting activity mostly confined to suppressing hotspots and building containment line.

On August 13, 2021, the River Fire was declared 100 percent contained. All evacuation warnings in Nevada and Placer Counties were lifted, as well as all evacuation orders in Placer County. On August 16, 2021, all areas under an evacuation order in Nevada County were reopened to the public after residents were able to survey the damage and retrieve property.

== Effects ==
The River Fire forced the evacuation of more than 7,000 people, including at least 2,400 people in Placer County and 4,200 people in Nevada County. Mandatory evacuation orders included the entire town of Colfax.

The River Fire destroyed 142 structures. Of these, 102 were single-family residential buildings, one was a commercial building, and 39 were outbuildings. In addition to the 142 destroyed structures, 21 structures were damaged. Four people were injured by the fire: two civilians and two firefighters, including a water tender driver who suffered minor burns.

On August 24, 2021, President Joe Biden approved a disaster declaration request for counties impacted by the ongoing Dixie Fire and the River Fire. Nevada and Placer Counties were able to seek public assistance for emergency work and repairs, and individuals affected in those counties were able to request financial assistance for any disaster-related needs through FEMA.

In late October, during widespread heavy precipitation brought by an atmospheric river and the October 2021 Northeast Pacific bomb cyclone, some areas that burned in the River Fire were again temporarily placed under mandatory evacuation orders due to potential for flash flooding.

== Cause ==
Cal Fire and Placer County Fire Department investigators began working immediately to determine the cause of the fire. On September 10, 2021, Cal Fire released their initial findings: "It has been determined that the River Fire started in the overnight camping area of the Bear River Campground and was human caused. This is an active case, and CAL FIRE investigators will continue to work on determining the specific details leading to the cause of the fire."

On March 7, 2022, Cal Fire released another update on the investigation. It specified that investigators had determined that the River Fire started on the brush alongside the Bear River's edge in the overnight camping area of the Bear River Campground, but did not start in a designated camp site. According to the investigation news release, "Multiple people tried to extinguish the fire in its early stages. During the investigation, items were found near the fire's origin indicating a person(s) had recently been present in the area." The report also stated that there was "no evidence to support any malicious intent or criminal charges at this time."

Bear River Campground does not permit open fires in the summer, between July 1 and October 1, or fireworks at any time of year. The campground did permit propane lanterns and stoves.

== See also ==
- 49er Fire – Another wind-driven and destructive wildfire in Nevada County
