= Bray, California =

Unincorporated community in California, United States

- Unincorporated community
- Location within California Location within the United States
- Coordinates: 41°38′42″N 121°58′3″W
- Country: United States
- State: California
- County: Siskiyou
- Elevation: 4,649 ft (1,417 m)
- Time zone: UTC-8 (Pacific (PST))
  - Summer (DST): UTC-7 (PDT)
- Area code: 530
- GNIS feature ID: 1658128

Bray is an unincorporated community in Siskiyou County, California, United States. Bray is approximately 20 miles (32 km) northeast of Mount Shasta and about 23 miles (37 km) south of the border with Oregon. It is located on the Union Pacific railroad (formerly the Southern Pacific Cascade Line).

Bray was established in 1907 when the railroad had been built up to that point. It was named for a nearby ranch. In its early days, Bray was a vacation destination for campers and hunters from distant parts of California.

The timber industry dominated Bray's economy for decades. Bray was the site of a wooden box factory, and several small sawmills operated in the surrounding forests. The box plant burned to the ground on July 17, 1928, nearly taking the town with it; the plant was never rebuilt. Later, during the Great Depression, Bray was the site of a Civilian Conservation Corps camp, Camp Leaf.

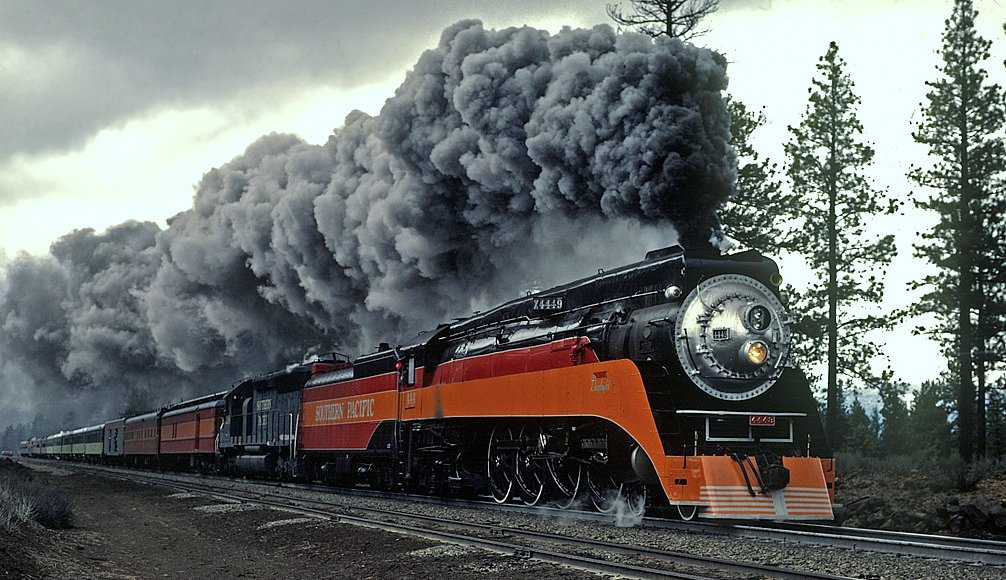
Southern Pacific 4449 passing through Bray in 1981

For a brief period in the 1930s, US Route 97 passed through Bray when it was first rerouted into California. In 1938, the current routing of US 97 via Mt. Hebron Summit and Grass Lake opened to traffic, once again isolating Bray from the state and federal highway network.

The Bray schoolhouse stood until at least 1947, by which time it was being used as a dance hall. The Bray post office lasted until 1967. As of the mid-2020s, only a few homes remain at Bray. The railroad still sees heavy traffic, but trains have not stopped in Bray for many decades.
