= Fire River (Ontario) =

- Location of the mouth of the Fire River in Ontario

Location
- Country: Canada
- Province: Ontario
- Region: Northeastern Ontario
- District: Algoma

Physical characteristics
- Source: Nameibin Lake
  - location: Moorehouse Township
  - coordinates: 48°38′59″N 84°01′00″W
  - elevation: 395 m (1,296 ft)
- Mouth: Missinaibi River
  - location: Ericson Township
  - coordinates: 48°52′08″N 83°21′06″W
  - elevation: 260 m (850 ft)

Basin features
- River system: James Bay drainage basin
- Tributaries
  - right: Nebotik River, Little Fire River

The Fire River is a river in Algoma District in northeastern Ontario, Canada. It is in the James Bay drainage basin, and is a left tributary of the Missinaibi River.

== Course ==
The river begins at Nameibin Lake, the location of the mouth of the Little Fire River, in geographic Moorehouse Township, and flows southeast, then turns northeast at Makadawa Lake and enters geographic Makawa Township. It continues northeast into geographic Mildred Township, then geographic Hook Township, where it takes in the right tributary Nebotik River, and enters the northwest corner of geographic Hayward Township. The river turns southeast and is paralleled by the Canadian National Railway transcontinental railway main line, a section of track traversed by freight trains and Via Rail transcontinental Canadian passenger trains. It heads past the settlement and railway point of Fire River, heads again northeast into geographic Puskuta Township then northeast into geographic Ericson Township, enters Missinaibi Provincial Park, and reaches its mouth at the Missinaibi River. The Missinaibi River flows via the Moose River to James Bay.

The river up to the crossing of the CN mainline is within the Chapleau Crown Game Preserve.

== Tributaries ==
- Puskuta Creek (left)
- Dishnish Creek (left)
- Nebotik River (right)
- Mildred Creek (left)
- Woodosgoon Creek (right)
- Gay Creek (right)
- Nameibin Lake (source)
  - Little Fire River

== Sources ==
- Map 14 (PDF) (Map). 1 : 1,600,000. Official road map of Ontario. Ministry of Transportation of Ontario. 2010-01-01.
- Restructured municipalities - Ontario map #3 (Map). Restructuring Maps of Ontario. Ontario Ministry of Municipal Affairs and Housing. 2006. Archived from the original on 2014-04-10.
