= Windy Fire =

2021 wildfire in Central California

- Part of the 2021 California wildfires
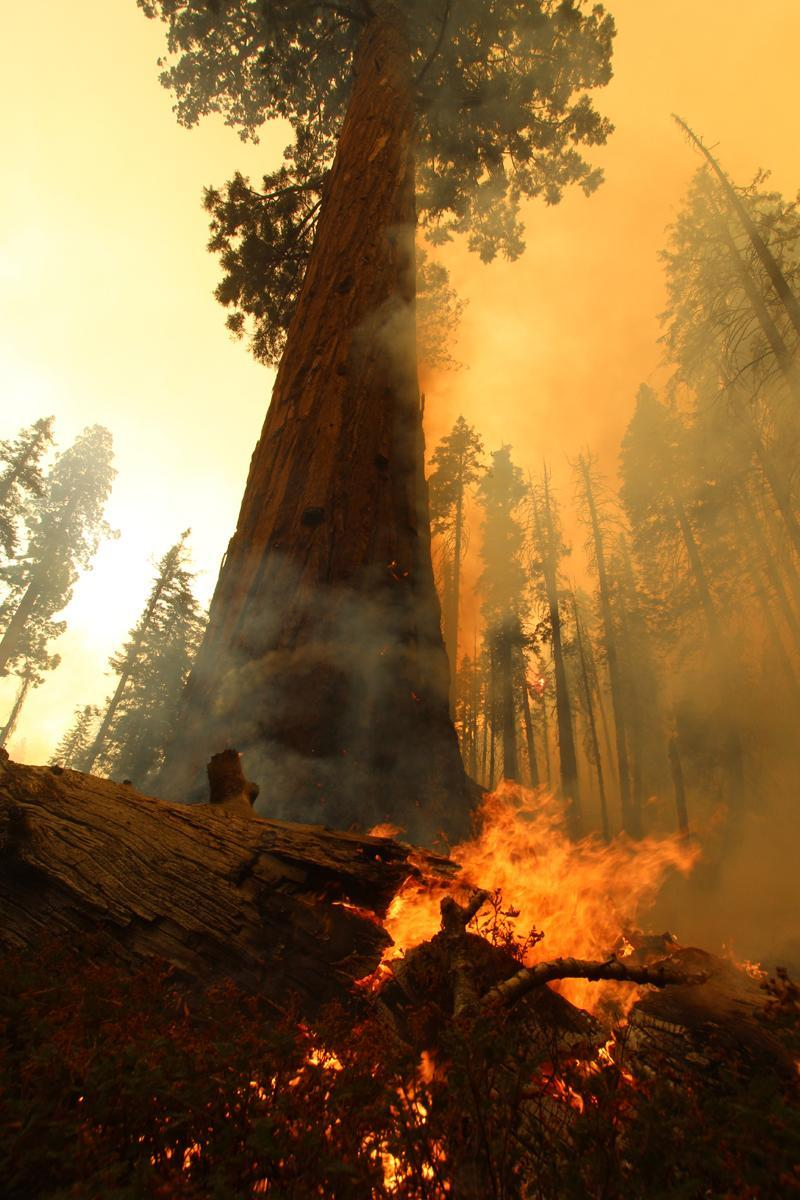
- The Windy Fire burns at the base of a giant sequoia near the Trail of 100 Giants
- Date: September 9 –; November 11, 2021; (64 days)
- Location: Tulare County, Central California, United States
- Coordinates: 36.058°N 118.625°W

Statistics
- Burned area: 97,528 acres (39,468 ha; 152 sq mi; 395 km^{2})

Impacts
- Injuries: ≥4
- Evacuated: >200
- Structures lost: 128
- Cost: $78.4 million

Ignition
- Cause: Lightning

Map
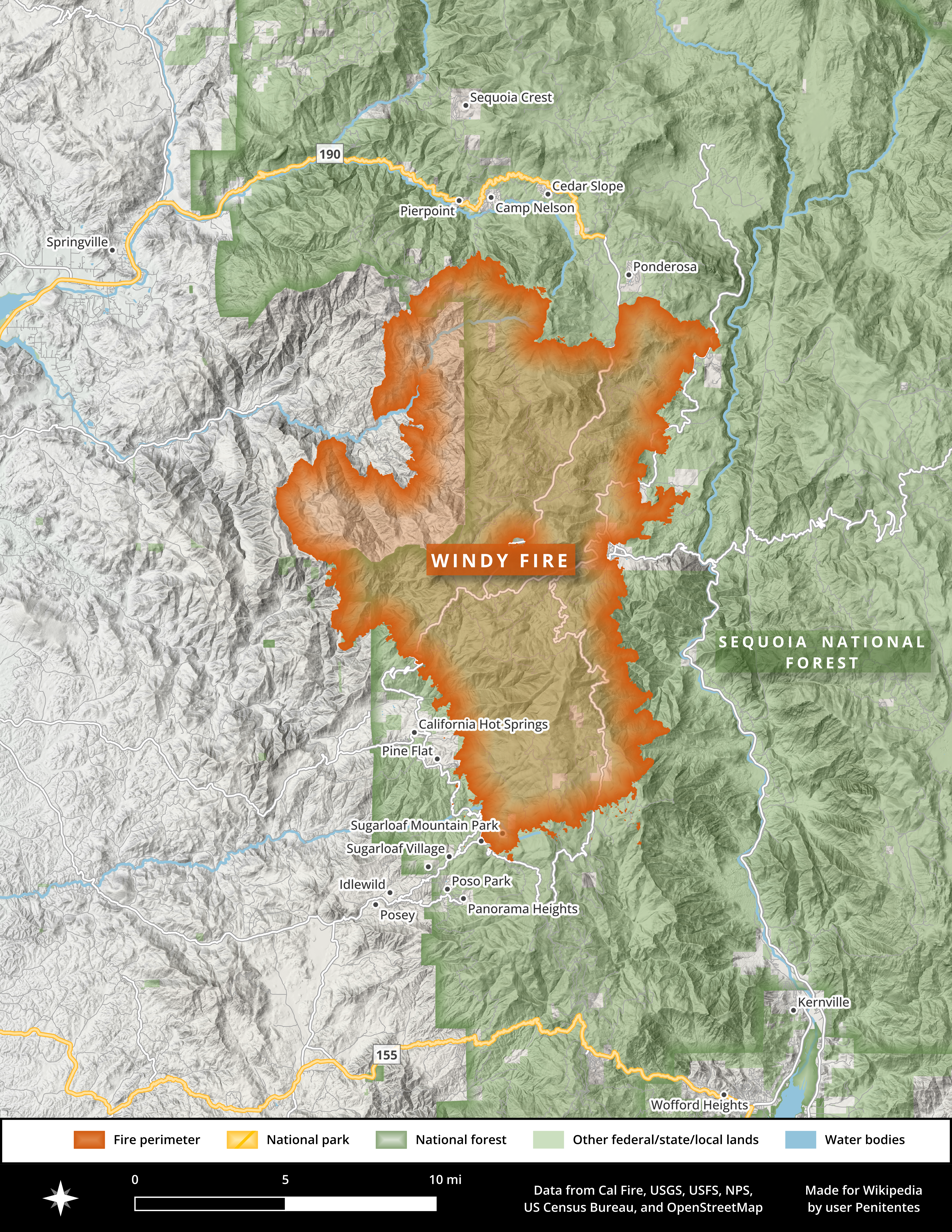
- The Windy Fire's perimeter (orange) was mostly in Sequoia National Forest (green)

- The general location of the Windy Fire in central California

The 2021 Windy Fire was a large wildfire in the Sequoia National Forest in Central California's Tulare County. Ignited by a lightning strike in the southern Sierra Nevada on September 9, the fire burned 97,528 acres (39,468 ha) over the course of a month, threatening communities like Ponderosa and Johnsondale. Multiple atmospheric rivers in October and November eventually subdued the fire, which was declared fully contained in mid-November. Total firefighting costs came to $78.4 million. The Windy Fire was the eight-largest fire of California's 2021 wildfire season.

Though it destroyed 128 structures, the Windy Fire was also notable for its major impacts on the endangered giant sequoia population, which grows in less than a hundred natural groves on the western slopes of the Sierra Nevada. The National Park Service estimated that the Windy Fire killed 900–1,300 large giant sequoias, part of a significant toll that high-severity wildfires have taken on the species in the 21st century. The KNP Complex Fire, which burned contemporaneously, burned 88,307 acres (35,737 ha) and killed up to 2,400 more large giant sequoias in Sequoia and Kings Canyon National Parks. The two fires are estimated to have killed as much as 3–5 percent of the total population of large giant sequoias.

== Background ==
The Windy Fire primarily burned within the Giant Sequoia National Monument, a 328,315-acre (132,864 ha) protected portion of the Sequoia National Forest containing dozens of giant sequoia groves.

The Windy Fire area saw many fewer fires in the period between 1970 and 2020 than occurred historically (prior to 1850). According to Christy Brigham, in charge of Resources Management and Science at Sequoia and Kings Canyon National Parks, more than fifty lightning fires were suppressed in the century or so prior to the fire that she argued could have been managed for beneficial effects in the region's sequoia groves. As fuels built up from the accumulating effects of fire suppression, widespread conifer die-off also occurred between 2012 and 2016. Drought and bark beetle infestations joined forces to kill an "estimated 147 million trees" in California.

California saw its second-driest water year ever in 2020–2021, exceeded in aridity only by that of 1923–1924. It was the driest ever water year on record for the southern Sierra Nevada in particular, with only 9.9 inches (25 cm) of rainfall compared to the region's average of 28.8 inches (73 cm). The summer of 2021 was also California's hottest ever recorded. The prolonged hot and dry conditions, courtesy of a high-pressure system that loitered over the state, contributed to a rash of significant wildfires.

The Washington Post listed the Windy Fire as an example of a wildfire that experienced "significant overnight growth", representative of the climate change-driven increase of the vapor pressure deficit at night in the western United States since 1980. The vapor pressure deficit, a key meteorological variable that drives fire-conducive weather, reached record high levels in California during the Windy Fire.

== Progression ==
=== September 9–16 ===
On the night of September 9, a procession of dry thunderstorms rolled across California. More than 1,100 cloud-to-ground lightning strikes were recorded in the state by the following morning, and associated rainfall was not enough to quench some of the small fires left in their wake. Eleven fires started in the Sequoia National Forest and the Giant Sequoia National Monument). The Windy Fire began that night on the Tule River Indian Reservation. The National Interagency Coordination Center reported on the morning of September 11 that the Windy Fire had burned 115 acres (47 ha) in timber and brush, exhibiting "active fire behavior with uphill runs, backing and flanking". By 4:00 p.m. on September 12, the fire had burned onto the Sequoia National Forest, spreading to 450 acres (182 ha). California Incident Management Team 11 entered into unified command over the firefighting response with the Forest Service and the Bureau of Indian Affairs.

The fire impacted the Peyrone Grove of giant sequoias by September 13. On September 15, the Forest Service announced a closure order for part of the Sequoia National Forest, effective September 16 until December 31. Overnight, the fire exhibited "significant" spread: in the morning update on the fire for September 16, officials gave the Windy Fire's burned area as 3,924 acres (1,588 ha) and its containment at zero percent. That same day, the fire's eastern flank crossed the Western Divide Highway and its southern flank reached the Long Meadow Grove of giant sequoias.

The Forest Service increased the size of the National Forest closure area on September 20, citing the fire's recent and anticipated growth. At around 8:00 p.m. on September 22, the Tulare County Sheriff's Office announced additional evacuation orders for the communities of Camp Nelson, Pierpoint, Coy Flat, Mountain Aire, Cedar Slope, Alpine Village, Rogers Camp, and Sequoia Crest. The fire grew by ~12,000 acres (4,856 ha) between September 22 and 23 for a total burned area of 43,745 acres (17,703 ha), stoked by the arrival of a dry air mass with attendant higher winds and lower humidity levels. The Forest Service closed more recreation sites in the Sequoia National Forest, primarily along the upper Kern River, on September 25. By September 29, the fire's advance to the south entered the burn scar from the 2016 Cedar Fire, limiting the fire activity there. On September 30, Forest Service smokejumpers, normally trained to climb trees to retrieve their parachutes, scaled the Bench Tree along the Trail of 100 Giants in order to extinguish flames in the canopy of an adjacent giant sequoia.

On October 2, the evacuation orders for areas Sugarloaf Village, Panorama Heights, Poso Park, Idlewild, Pleasant View, Balance Rock, Posey and Vincent Ranch were reduced to evacuation warnings. Following the reduction, only 200 or so people remained under evacuation orders in all Tulare County. The decreased evacuations followed an increase in containment to 52 percent. But despite the cooler perimeter, an area of high pressure remained over the fire area in early October, keeping the weather hot and dry, and supporting unusually vigorous fire activity at night. The Windy Fire's incident commander, Mark Morales, described conditions as "more like what you would observe in August: very dry with high temperatures and low humidity." Despite the conditions, the fire's last day with any growth recorded was October 9, one month after it had begun. By November 3, the fire was 92 percent contained. The remaining eight percent of uncontained perimeter, north of Cold Springs Creek and south of the Tule River Indian Reservation, lay in an area too difficult for ground personnel to access. It was left to burn itself out, under the supervision of aircraft, until the arrival of winter storms.

The Windy Fire's precise date of containment is variously recorded as November 10 by the National Interagency Coordination Center, November 11 by the National Park Service, and November 15 by Cal Fire; whichever the case, by that time the fire had not grown in size for over a month. The total cost of fighting the Windy Fire came to $78.4 million. The total burned area included more than 75,000 acres (30,000 ha) in Sequoia National Forest, more than 19,000 acres (7,700 ha) on the Tule River Indian Reservation, and more than 1,000 acres (400 ha) each of BLM land and private land.

National Forest infrastructure slowly resumed operation over the following months: the fire closure area was reduced in size on November 23, the Western Divide Highway reopened to through traffic on November 30, and the Trail of 100 Giants in Giant Sequoia National Monument reopened to the public on May 13, 2022.

In July 2022, the USFS reported multiple small holdover fires caused by smoldering giant sequoia trees, two of them from the Windy Fire the year before. The Cougar Fire in Red Hill Grove was contained at one acre (0.40 ha). The Crawford Fire, less than a half mile away, was contained at one-quarter acre (0.10 ha).

== Effects ==
At least four personnel sustained injuries in the course of fighting the Windy Fire; all were minor but one: a firefighter was taken to a Fresno hospital with second-degree burns on September 30. The fire caused zero fatalities.

The National Interagency Coordination Center records that 128 structures were lost to the Windy Fire. (Note: According to Cal Fire, the Windy Fire destroyed 21 structures. The reason for the discrepancy is unknown.) Of those, 20 were residences, two were commercial buildings, and the remaining 106 were outbuildings. The destroyed residences included at least 14 homes in Sugarloaf Village. Destroyed Forest Service structures included a boardwalk at the Trail of 100 Giants, the Frog Meadow Guard Station, the Powder Horn and Speas Dirty Camp historic cabins, the Mule Peak Lookout and its radio repeater, and other outbuildings, storage sheds, and wooden bridges. The Mule Peak Lookout, established in 1935, was one of the last remaining fire lookouts in the Sequoia National Forest.

=== Giant sequoias ===
The Windy Fire impacted eleven giant sequoia groves, comprising more than 1,735 acres (702 ha). (Note: According to the National Park Service, this acreage estimate "does not include two groves on the Tule River Reservation for which there is not publicly available spatial data".) On November 19, 2021, the Burned Area Emergency Response (BAER) team assigned to the Windy and KNP Complex fires released their report, which discussed a variety of fire impacts, post-fire hazards, and potential actions for response. Within the report, an analysis conducted by Nature Conservancy and National Park Service scientists used a combination of fire severity data, satellite imagery, aerial reconnaissance, and limited ground assessments to estimate possible large giant sequoia mortality from the Windy Fire. In total, the National Park Service report estimated that the Windy Fire killed between 931 and 1,257 large sequoias, defined as those over four feet (1.2 metres) in diameter. The estimate includes the sequoias killed outright as well as those expected to die in the three to five years following the fire. When combined with the estimated large sequoia mortality of 1,330–2,380 trees from the KNP Complex Fire, the two wildfires are responsible for the death of 3–5 percent of the large sequoia population.

The National Park Service's assessment highlighted an "alarming trend" given the previous large sequoia mortality from the Castle Fire in 2020—part of the SQF Complex fire—which killed an estimated 10–14 percent of large sequoias (or between 7,500 and 10,600 individual trees). The two mortality assessments suggest that in 2020 and 2021, 13–19 percent of the world's large sequoia population was lost in just three wildfires. Prior to 2020, the total number of large sequoias within the groves of the Sierra Nevada was estimated at 75,580; the total number may have fallen to ~60,000 after the Castle, Windy, and KNP Complex fires. Land managers attributed the excessive toll to fuel loads and fire behavior too severe for the trees to tolerate, driven by climate change, drought, and the zealous suppression of wildfire in those areas for a hundred years or more.

==== List of groves impacted ====
The following is a summary of all the groves that the Windy Fire impacted. High severity fire refers to that causing overstory mortality greater than 80 percent. Most of the giant sequoias in high severity fire areas were killed.

List of giant sequoia groves burned
Name	Total grove acreage	Total burned acreage	% burned at high severity	Comments
Black Mountain Grove	3,084 acres (1,248 ha)	90 acres (36 ha)	3%	Past fire history and fuels reduction efforts reduced the damage to this grove.
Cunningham Grove	32 acres (13 ha)	32 acres (13 ha)	0%	Past fire history and fuels reduction efforts reduced the damage to this grove.
Deer Creek Grove	144 acres (58 ha)	144 acres (58 ha)	53%	The Windy Fire burned through this grove on or around September 23, resulting in "'heavy scorch' to many trees".
Long Meadow Grove	568 acres (230 ha)	568 acres (230 ha)	29%	Firefighters prepared this grove in advance of the Windy Fire's arrival, at times pumping 20,000 gallons of water per day onto the trees via dozens of sprinklers. In concert with past fuels reduction efforts near the Trail of 100 Giants, the measures ensured the heart of Long Meadow Grove received less damage. At least 29 giant sequoias were "incinerated" elsewhere in the grove.
Packsaddle Grove	533 acres (216 ha)	528 acres (214 ha)	32%	
Peyrone Grove	741 acres (300 ha)	741 acres (300 ha)	12%	
Redhill Grove	602 acres (244 ha)	602 acres (244 ha)	31%	Past fire history and fuels reduction efforts reduced the damage to this grove.
South Peyrone Grove	115 acres (47 ha)	115 acres (47 ha)	21%	
Starvation Complex	182 acres (74 ha)	182 acres (74 ha)	92%	The Starvation Complex comprises the Starvation Creek Grove and the Powderhorn Grove, both small groves located in the Deer Creek drainage. The Starvation Creek grove had no recent fire history, and crews only had several hours to conduct emergency preparations for the Windy Fire's arrival. The Starvation Creek Grove entirely burned in the Windy Fire, killing approximately 116 giant sequoias and leaving only four alive.
North Cold Spring Grove	---	---	---	The North Cold Spring Grove is within the Tule River Indian Reservation. While it burned in the Windy Fire, it was left out of Forest Service analyses. A forester with the Tule River Indian Tribe estimated that more than 20 large giant sequoias had been killed on reservation lands.
Parker Peak Grove	---	---	---	The Parker Peak Grove is within the Tule River Indian Reservation. While it burned in the Windy Fire, it was left out of Forest Service analyses. A forester with the Tule River Indian Tribe estimated that more than 20 large giant sequoias had been killed on reservation lands.

=== Other environmental impacts ===
A Forest Service burned area emergency response (BAER) assessment team evaluated the fire's burned area. The area's soil burn severity was mapped, with approximately 43 percent of it at unburned to low severity, 47 percent of it at moderate severity, and 10 percent of the area burned at a high soil burn severity. The Windy Fire also burned more than 93,000 acres (38,000 ha) of fisher habitat in conifer and hardwood forests, more than 43,000 acres (17,000 ha) of which burned at a high severity.

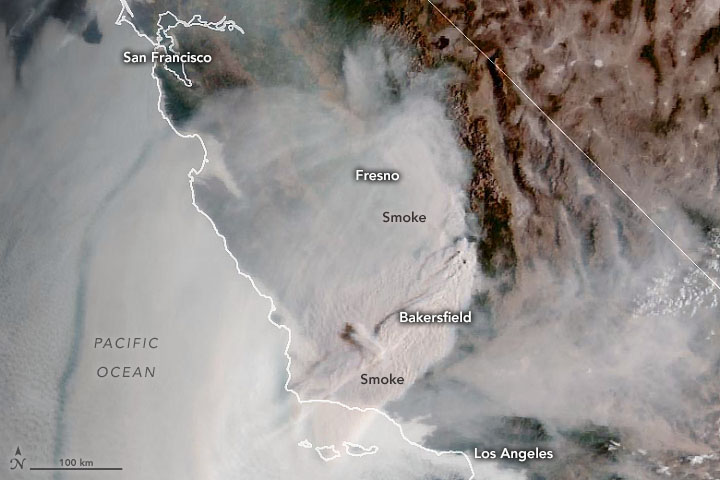
The Windy and KNP Complex Fires put out smoke plumes over Southern California on September 24, 2021, as seen by NOAA's GOES-17 satellite

Smoke from the Windy and KNP Complex fires inundated large portions of California during late September and early October, largely affecting the San Joaquin Valley but occasionally impacting Southern California. Thick smoke in San Joaquin, Stanislaus, Merced, Madera, Fresno, Tulare, Kings, and Kern counties caused local high schools to cancel football games, and those with respiratory ailments were advised to remain indoors. Areas affected included Fresno, Bakersfield, Kernville, and Lake Isabella. On September 27, the air quality in Kernville to the southeast of the Windy Fire was the worst in the country, with an air quality index (AQI) of 437, well into the 'hazardous' level of health concern. At least once, north winds pushed smoke more than a hundred miles south. Dozens of people in the Los Angeles area called 911 to report the smoke and the South Coast Air Quality Management District issued a special air quality advisory for parts of the San Gabriel and San Bernardino mountains for multiple days.

In August 2023, the California Department of Fish and Wildlife confirmed that the Windy Fire burn area had become home to a pack of at least five gray wolves, marking the species' first presence in the Sequoia National Forest since they were extirpated approximately 150 years prior. Researchers attributed the return to increased deer and other prey populations, which had benefited from the fire stimulating increased grass growth.

== Growth and containment ==
The table below shows how the fire grew in size and in containment during September and October in 2021. Acreage reflects, where possible, the figure reported in the daily morning update following overnight aerial infrared mapping of the fire. The graph runs from September 9, the day the fire began, until October 9, the last day where fire growth was reported (though the fire was not declared completely contained for more than a month afterward).

Fire containment status Gray : contained; Red : active; %: percent contained
Date	Area burned (Note: The maximum reported acreage decreased by 26 acres between October 9 and November 11; this is likely due to more accurate infrared mapping or GIS calculations.)	Personnel	Containment
Sep 9	...	...	...
Sep 10	...	...	...
Sep 11	115 acres (47 ha)	47 personnel	
Sep 12	450 acres (182 ha)	...	
Sep 13	974 acres (394 ha)	...	
Sep 14	1,454 acres (588 ha)	...	
Sep 15	2,202 acres (891 ha)	...	
Sep 16	3,924 acres (1,588 ha)	...	
Sep 17	6,849 acres (2,772 ha)	...	
Sep 18	12,370 acres (5,006 ha)	...	
Sep 19	21,598 acres (8,740 ha)	...	
Sep 20	25,191 acres (10,194 ha)	...	
Sep 21	27,183 acres (11,001 ha)	...	
Sep 22	31,388 acres (12,702 ha)	...	
Sep 23	43,745 acres (17,703 ha)	...	
Sep 24	56,802 acres (22,987 ha)	1,540 personnel	
Sep 25	71,349 acres (28,874 ha)	1,776 personnel	
Sep 26	78,428 acres (31,739 ha)	2,136 personnel	
Sep 27	85,383 acres (34,553 ha)	2,303 personnel	
Sep 28	87,318 acres (35,336 ha)	2,402 personnel	
Sep 29	87,901 acres (35,572 ha)	2,393 personnel	
Sep 30	88,068 acres (35,640 ha)	2,498 personnel	
Oct 1	89,804 acres (36,342 ha)	2,500 personnel	
Oct 2	91,237 acres (36,922 ha)	2,342 personnel	
Oct 3	92,473 acres (37,422 ha)	2,284 personnel	
Oct 4	94,746 acres (38,342 ha)	2,284 personnel	
Oct 5	97,014 acres (39,260 ha)	1,972 personnel	
Oct 6	97,459 acres (39,440 ha)	1,573 personnel	
Oct 7	97,514 acres (39,463 ha)	1,506 personnel	
Oct 8	97,514 acres (39,463 ha)	1,356 personnel	
Oct 9	97,554 acres (39,479 ha)	1,287 personnel	
...	...	...	...
Nov 11	97,528 acres (39,468 ha)	...	

== See also ==
- Glossary of wildfire terms
- Rough Fire (2015) – Killed giant sequoias in General Grant Grove
- Pier Fire (2017) – Killed giant sequoias in Black Mountain Grove
- Railroad Fire (2017) – Killed giant sequoias in Nelder Grove
- Washburn Fire (2022) – Threatened giant sequoias in Mariposa Grove
