= Sequoia National Forest =

National forest in California, United States

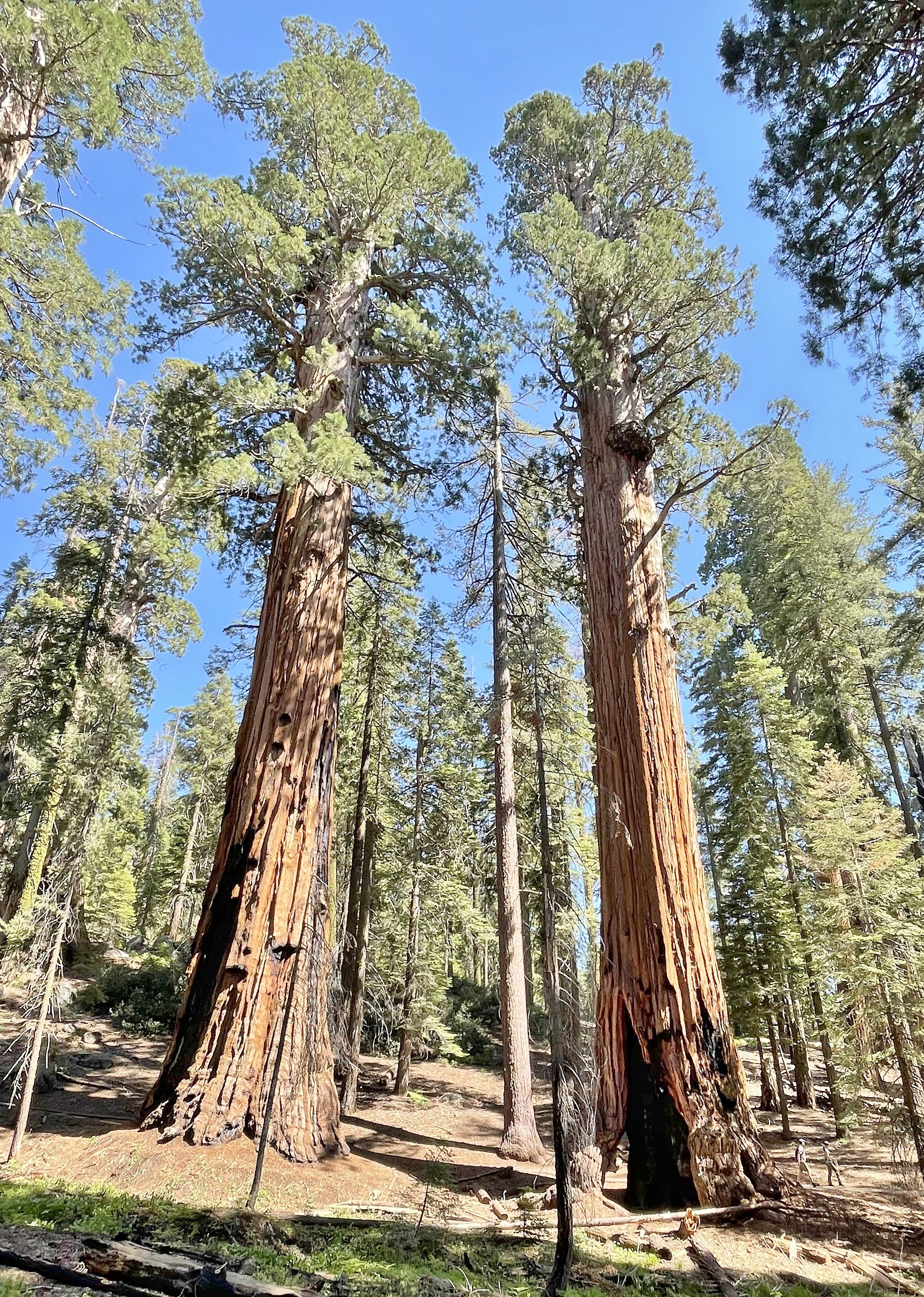
- Gothic Arch aka Alta Twin Sequoia Trees in Sequoia National Park
- Interactive map of Sequoia National Forest
- Location: Tulare / Kern / Fresno counties, California, US
- Nearest city: Bakersfield, CA / Porterville, CA
- Coordinates: 36°2′24″N 118°30′16″W
- Area: 1,193,315 acres (4,829.17 km^{2})
- Established: 1908
- Governing body: U.S. Forest Service
- Website: Sequoia National Forest

Sequoia National Forest is a U.S. national forest located in the southern Sierra Nevada mountains of California. It is named for the majestic Giant Sequoia (Sequoiadendron giganteum) trees which populate 38 distinct groves within its boundaries.

The Giant Sequoia National Monument is located in the national forest. Other notable features include glacier-carved landscapes and impressive granite monoliths. The Needles are a series of granite spires atop a narrow ridge above the Kern River. Forest Service headquarters are located in Porterville, California. There are local ranger district offices in Dunlap, Kernville, Lake Isabella, and Springville.

== Geography ==
The Sequoia National Forest covers 1,193,315 acres (1,864.555 sq mi; 4,829.17 km^{2}), and ranges in elevation from 1,000 feet (300 m) in the foothills of the Sierra Nevada to over 12,000 feet (3,700 m). Its giant sequoia (Sequoiadendron giganteum) groves are part of its 196,000 acres (790 km^{2}) of old growth forests. Other tree species include:

- Jeffrey pine (Pinus jeffreyi)
- Red fir (Abies magnifica)
- Coast Douglas-fir (Pseudotsuga menziesii var. menziesii)
- Ponderosa pine (Pinus ponderosa)
- White fir (Abies concolor)
- Lodgepole pine (Pinus contorta)

The National Forest contains over 2,500 miles (4,000 km) of road and 850 miles (1,370 km) of trails, and hosts a number of camping and recreational facilities. The forest is adjacent to Sequoia and Kings Canyon National Parks.

=== Wilderness areas ===
There are six wilderness areas within Sequoia NF that are part of the National Wilderness Preservation System. Some of these extend into neighboring National Forests, as indicated. Two of them also extend into land that is managed by the Bureau of Land Management.

- Domeland Wilderness (partly BLM)
- Golden Trout Wilderness (mostly in Inyo NF)
- Jennie Lakes Wilderness
- Kiavah Wilderness (mostly BLM)
- Monarch Wilderness (partly in Sierra NF)
- South Sierra Wilderness (mostly in Inyo NF)

=== Giant Sequoia National Monument ===
On April 15, 2000, President Bill Clinton proclaimed 328,000-acre (1,330 km^{2}) of the Sequoia National Forest as the Giant Sequoia National Monument by Presidential Proclamation 7295, published in the Federal Register, Tuesday, April 25, 2000, Vol. 65, No. 80.

The monument is in two sections. The northern section surrounds General Grant Grove and other parts of Kings Canyon National Park and is administered by the Hume Lake Ranger District. The southern section is directly south of Sequoia National Park and is administered by the Western Divide Ranger District, surrounding the eastern half of the Tule River Indian Reservation.

=== The Needles ===
The Needles are a series of granite spires atop a narrow ridge above the Kern River.(36.1214°N 118.5044°W) The Needles Lookout trail, which takes you up to the rock formation, is 2.5 miles long. The Needles Fire Lookout Tower, which sat on top of a spire referred to as “The Magician” was destroyed in a structure fire on July 28, 2011.

== Climate ==
According to the Köppen climate classification system, Sequoia National Forest encompasses five climate types listed here from highest to lowest elevation; Tundra (ET), Mediterranean-influenced Subarctic climate (Dsc), Mediterranean-influenced warm-summer Humid continental climate (Dsb), Warm-summer Mediterranean climate (Csb), and Hot-summer Mediterranean climate (Csa). Precipitation also decreases with elevation. According to the United States Department of Agriculture, the Plant Hardiness zone at Giant Forest Visitor Center (6,444 ft (1,964 m)) is 8a with an average annual extreme minimum temperature of 12.0 °F (−11.1 °C).

== Flora and fauna ==
While the Sequoia National Forest contains many overlapping species between itself and Sequoia National Park, the geographical differences make more species abundant in either territory.

The Sequoia National Forest contains four distinct ecological zones, each of which are found at different elevations and support different species. The lowest points in the Forest consist of Chaparral and Oak woodland, containing several species of wildflower, shrubs, and oak trees. This zone creeps into the Montane forest, which supports the white fir, red fir, sugar pine, incense-cedar, and ponderosa pine. The giant sequoias can also been found within this zone. Above this zone is the subalpine and alpine forests, which supports varied sorts of alpine tundra flora, notably lodgepole pine and red fir. The Sequoia National Forest also contains scattered wetland niches.

The Sequoia National Forest is home to a variety of wildlife, including mammals like black bears, mule deer, mountain lions, and squirrels; birds like the California quail and scrub jay; reptiles like gopher snakes and the Western fence lizard; and amphibians like the California newt. The forest also supports several species of fish, including the threatened Little Kern golden trout.

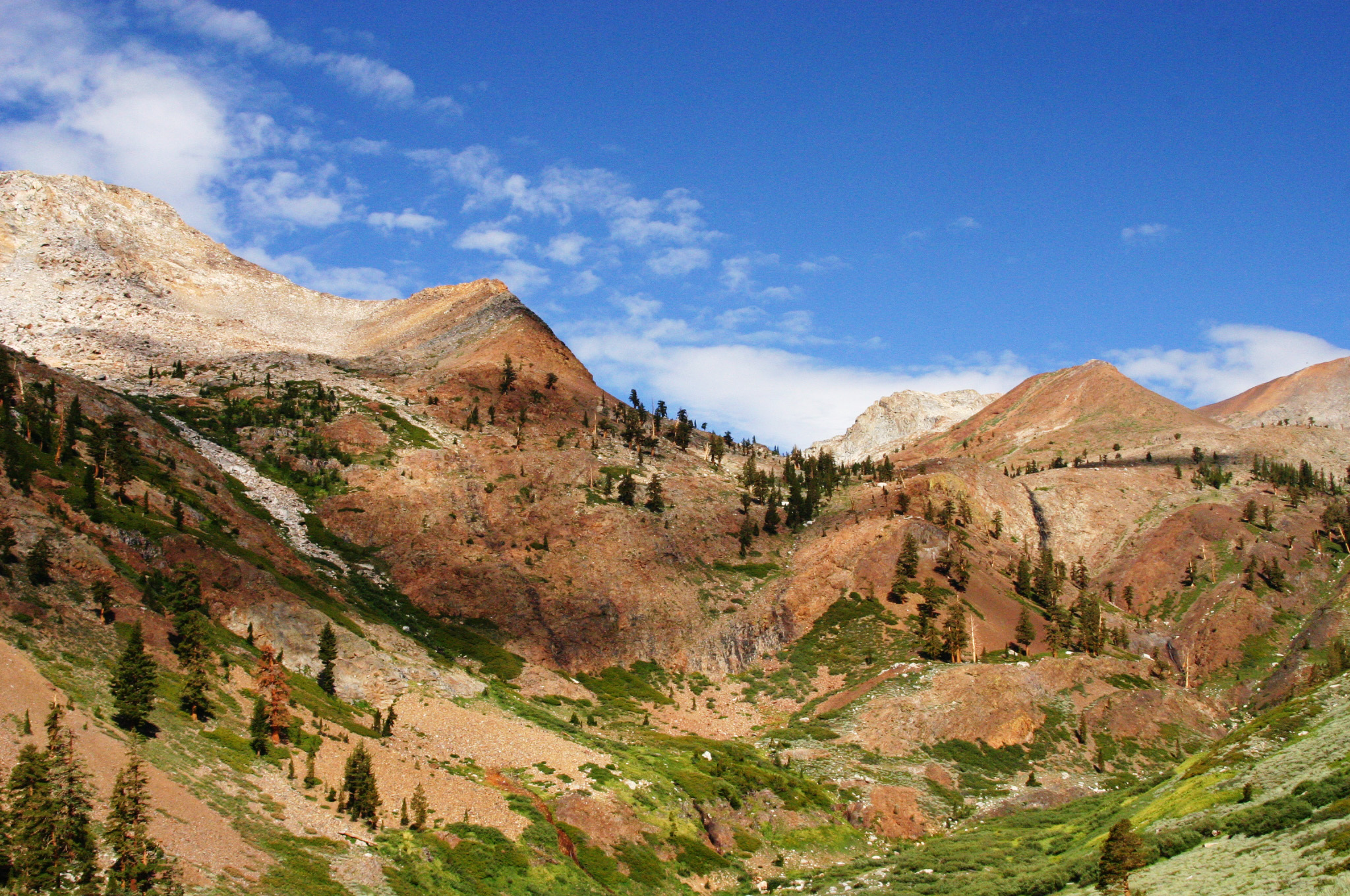
Farewell Gap in the Golden Trout Wilderness

== History ==
Sequoia National Forest was established on July 1, 1908, from a portion of Sierra Forest Reserve. On March 2, 1909, Theodore Roosevelt added land by Presidential Proclamation. On July 1, 1910 1,951,191 acres (7,896.19 km^{2}) was removed from the forest to create the Kern National Forest. This land was returned to Sequoia National Forest on July 1, 1915.

=== Fire impact ===
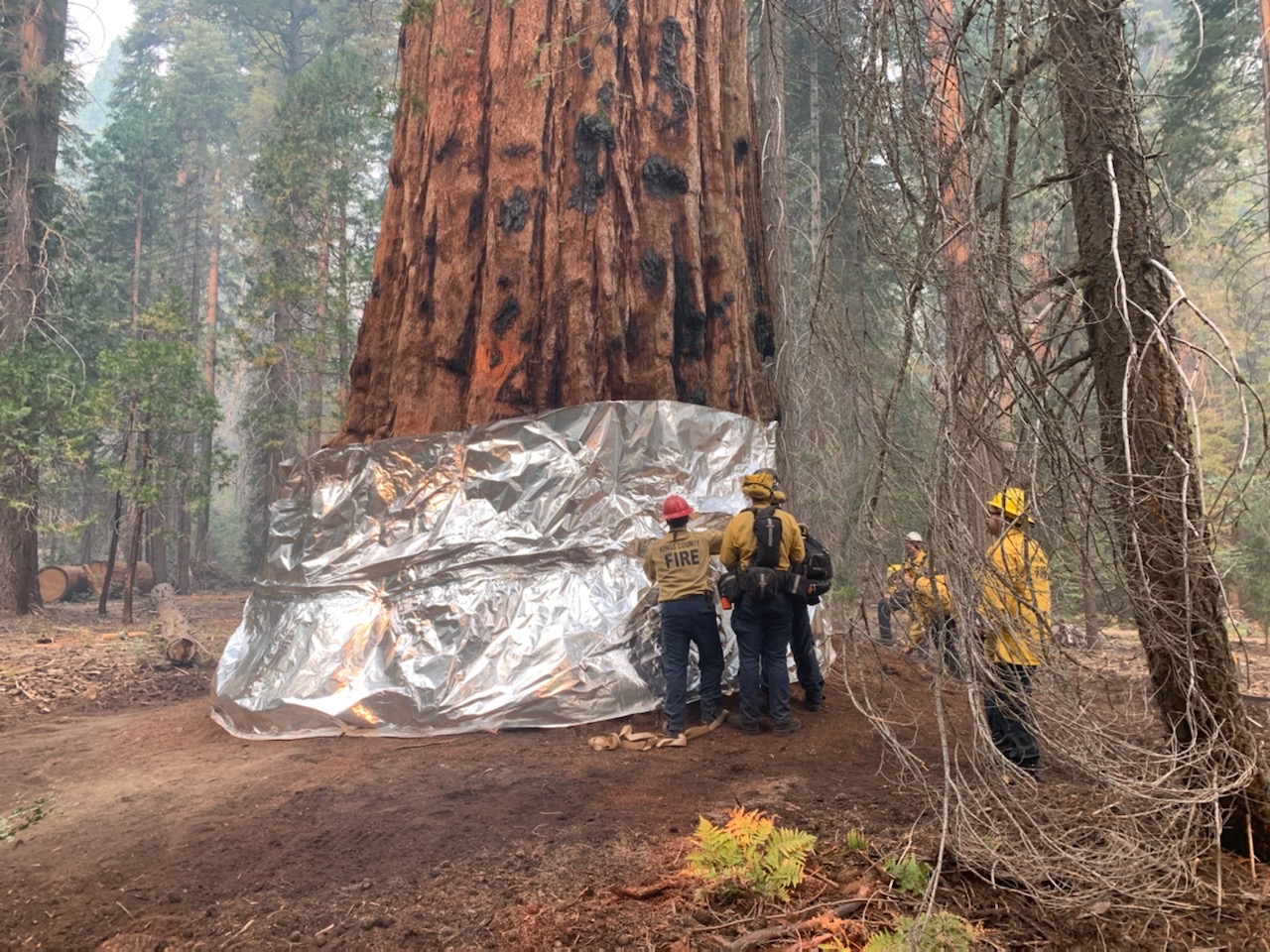
Fire protection foil being applied to a tree in summer 2022

The Castle Fire in 2020 burned 131,087 acres (53,049 ha) in the forest, with 13,600 acres (5,500 ha) of giant sequoia groves burned The fire swept through portions of the Dillonwood, Mountain Home, Alder Creek, Freeman Creek, McIntyre, and Wheel Meadow, Belknap, Burro Creek, Silver Creek, Middle Tule, Upper Tule, and Wishon Groves. The fire burned at high intensity in 6,000 acres (2,400 ha) of sequoia groves: high-intensity fire kills more than 90% of the giant sequoias in the area. The number of mature Sequoia Trees that died overall is estimated at over 7500–10,600 mature trees, or over 10-14% of the species' population.

The most intense previous fire in this area is dated to 1297 based on tree ring data. The McIntrye Grove, a short distance to the south from Cedar Slope, was heavily damaged. Near Sequoia Crest, one-third of the Alder Creek Grove of Giant Sequoia was severely damaged. The large Stagg Tree in Alder Creek Grove was not impacted. Other areas experienced "light fire" which is expected to be ecologically beneficial in the long run.

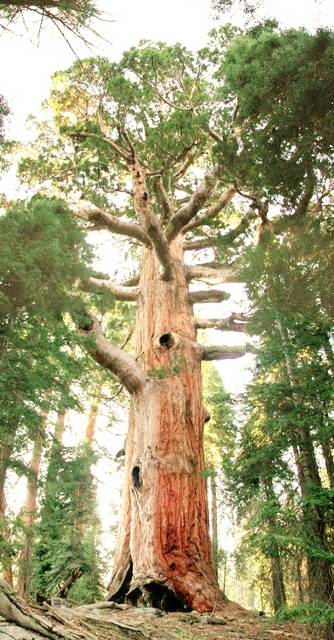
The Great Bonsai tree was destroyed in the Castle Fire of 2020

The following individual large Giant Sequoias in the forest have been reported to be damaged or destroyed in the Castle Fire:

- Genesis Tree (heavily damaged, previously the seventh-largest tree)
- Great Bonsai tree
- Summit Road Tree (damaged, the 15th-largest tree)
- Waterfall Tree (previously the sequoia with the largest ground perimeter
- Window Tree
- The Patriarch Tree

The Windy Fire in 2021 burned over 97,528 acres (39,468 ha), including a large area in the forest. A number of groves were completely within the fire perimeter, including the Cunningham, Deer Creek, Long Meadow, Packsaddle, Peyrone, Redhill, South Peyrone, and Starvation Creek Groves. Over 3,000 acres (1,200 ha) of groves were within the fire perimeter. Satellite image analysis showed that 50% of that area was burned at moderate or high intensity: over 1,000 giant sequoia were estimated to be destroyed in the forest. Only four mature giant sequoia survived the fire in the Starvation Creek Grove.

== Giant sequoia groves ==
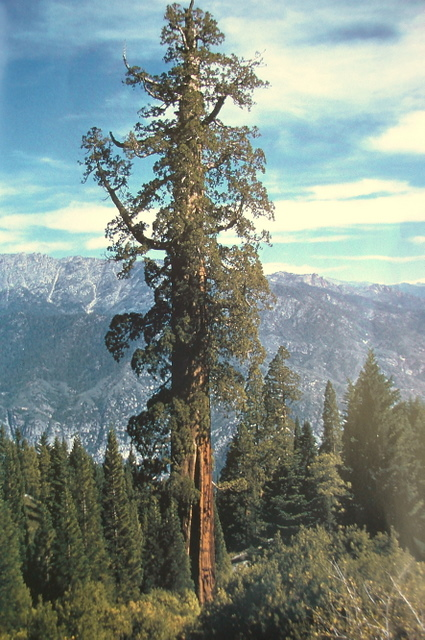
The Boole Tree, the sixth-largest tree by volume

The Sequoia National Forest has 34 giant sequoia groves.

- The 14 groves in the Kings River watershed are in the northern section of Giant Sequoia National Monument (GSNM), or in the Sequoia National Forest (SeNF), in southernmost Fresno County and Tulare County:
1. Indian Basin Grove (GSNM) A mid-size grove, mostly logged. It can be accessed by paved roads. The grove contains many young sequoias approaching diameters of up to 10 feet (3.0 m). 36°48′N 118°56′W 1800–2000 m.
2. Converse Basin Grove (GSNM). Once the second-largest grove, but much logged around 1890–1900; However, nearly 100 widely scattered old-growth Giant Sequoias remain (apparently bypassed by the loggers), also good regrowth of younger trees. Home of the Boole Tree, which the loggers spared as it was by far the largest tree in the grove and is now identified as the sixth-largest tree by volume. Also home of the Chicago Stump, which is the remnant of the General Noble Tree that was cut for the 1893 World Columbian Exposition; the General Noble Tree was the second largest tree in the grove (after the Boole Tree) and it was the largest tree ever cut down. Although not among the very largest Giant Sequoias, the General Noble Tree was perhaps among the top 30 largest Giant Sequoias before it was cut. 36°48′N 118°58′W 1800–2000 m.
3. Lockwood Grove (GSNM). 36°48′N 118°52′W 1700–1800 m.
4. Monarch Grove (GSNM). Immediately north of the Agnew Grove, near Monarch Wilderness boundary. On Forest Service GSNM map.
5. Evans Grove (GSNM). Partially logged, before 1920. 36°48'N 118°49'30"W 2050–2250 m.
6. Agnew & Deer Meadow Grove (GSNM). 36°47′20″N 118°46′45″W 1950–2000 m.
7. Cherry Gap Grove (GSNM). Logged. Located between Converse Basin Grove and General Grant Grove, near McGee Overlook (36°46′40″N 118°57′30″W). 2070 m. Cherry Gap Grove is a small sequoia grove of about thirty-five acres in Sequoia national forest; it was logged of all of its old growth sequoias.
8. Abbott Creek Grove (GSNM). 36°46′N 118°58′W 1900 m. Listed by Rundel and Flint; very small (largely logged); too few trees to qualify as a grove according to Willard.
9. Kennedy Grove (GSNM). 36°46′0″N 118°49′20″W 2050–2250 m. Contains the 13th largest giant sequoia in the world, The Ishi Giant.
10. Little Boulder Creek Grove (GSNM). 36°45′10″N 118°49′0″W 2000 m.
11. Boulder Creek Grove (GSNM). 36°45′N 118°49′W 2050 m.
12. Landslide Grove (GSNM). 36°45′0″N 118°51′50″W 2050–2250 m.
13. Bearskin Grove (GSNM). 36°45′0″N 118°54′40″W 1850–1900 m.
14. Big Stump Grove (KCNP/GSNM). 36°43′N 118°58′W 1850 m.
- One grove in the Kaweah River watershed:
1. Redwood Mountain Grove (KCNP/GSNM). The largest grove, 1240 ha (3100 acres), with 15,800 sequoias 30 cm (one foot) or more in diameter at the base.

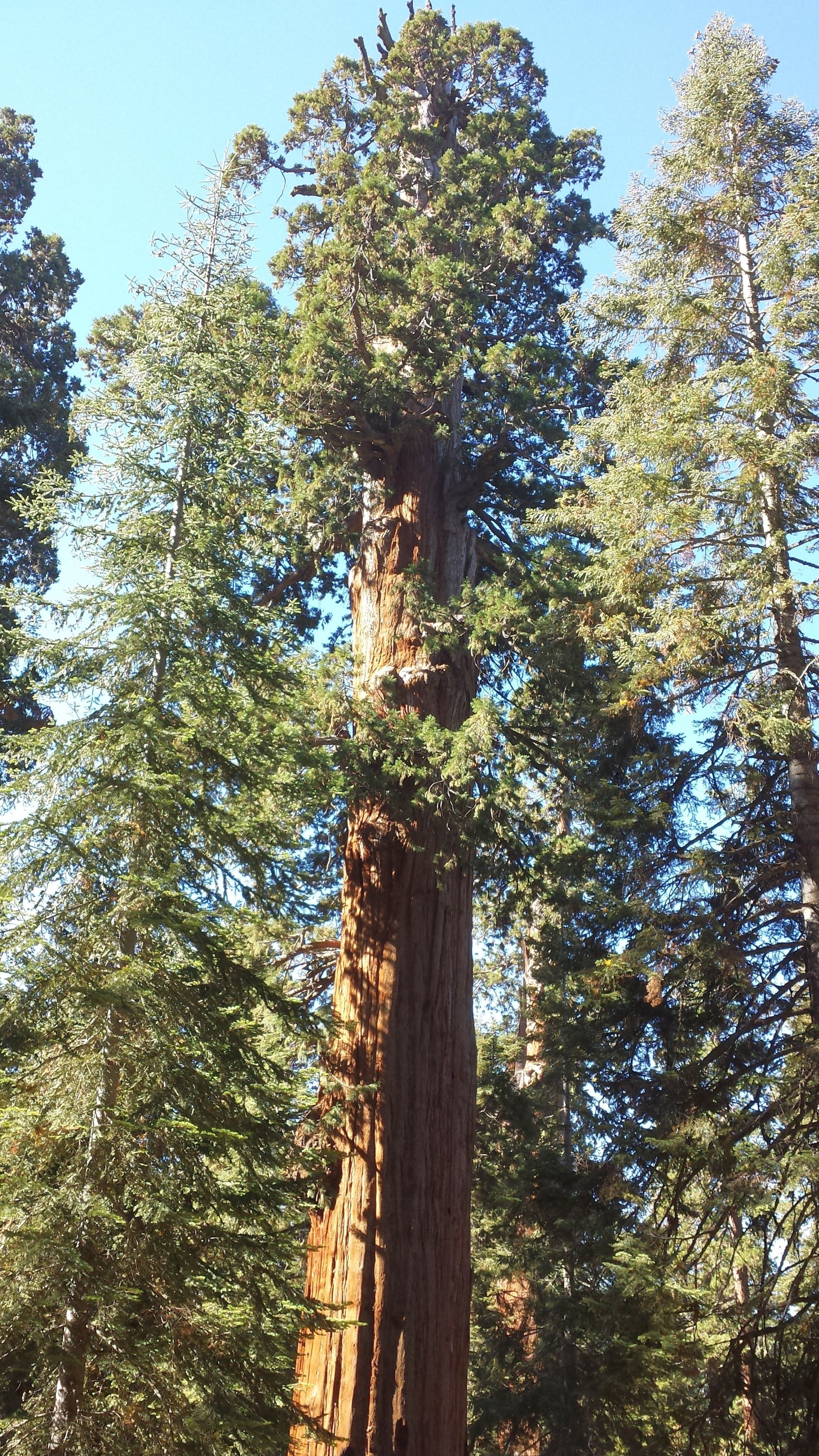
The Genesis Tree, 7th-largest tree in the world (before the Castle Fire in 2020)

- The 19 groves in the Tule River and Kern River watersheds are mostly in Giant Sequoia National Monument (GSNM); all in southern Tulare County.
1. Upper Tule Grove (GSNM). Included on Forest Service GSNM map.
2. Maggie Mountain Grove (GSNM).
3. Silver Creek Grove (GSNM).
4. Mountain Home Grove (CSF / GSNM). Home of the 'Genesis' tree, seventh largest by volume, this grove also contains the smaller Middle Tule Grove
5. Burro Creek Grove (GSNM).
6. Wishon Grove (GSNM). South of Silver Creek Grove. Included on Forest Service GSNM map.
7. Alder Creek Grove (GSNM / private); also known as Hossack, Pixley, or Ross Creek Grove. Home of 'Alonzo Stagg', the fifth largest tree by volume. Also home to the Waterfall tree, which has the largest circumference and diameter at ground level of any sequoia.
8. McIntyre Grove (GSNM).
9. Carr Wilson Grove(GSNM); also known as Bear Creek Grove.
10. Freeman Creek Grove (GSNM).
11. Black Mountain Grove (GSNM / TIR / private). Heavily logged in 1984, though mature sequoias were not cut.
12. Red Hill Grove (GSNM / private).
13. Peyrone Grove (GSNM / TIR).
14. South Peyrone Grove (GSNM) New discovery by Willard in 1992.
15. Long Meadow Grove (GSNM), Site of the Trail of 100 Giants and one tree of great size.
16. Cunningham Grove (GSNM).
17. Starvation Creek Grove (GSNM).
18. Packsaddle Grove (GSNM).
19. Deer Creek Grove (GSNM). The southernmost grove.

== See also ==
- List of giant sequoia groves
- List of national forests of the United States
- List of plants of the Sierra Nevada (U.S.)
- Category:Fauna of the Sierra Nevada (United States)
- Ecology of the Sierra Nevada
- Hume-Bennett Lumber Company
- macOS Sequoia

== Notes ==
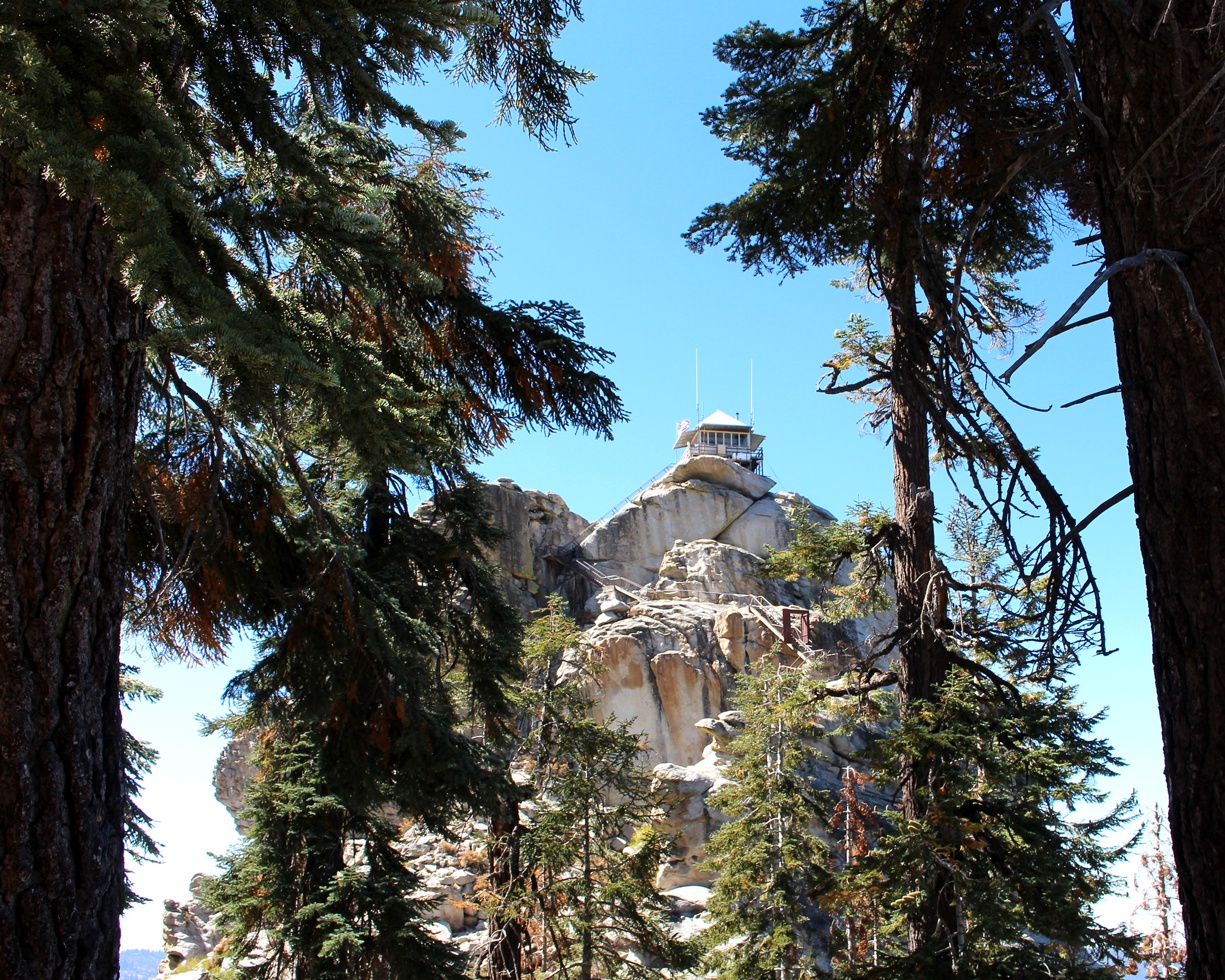
Buck Rock Fire Lookout, Sequoia National Forest, was built in 1923

=== References ===
- "Sequoia National Forest". United States Department of Agriculture Forest Service. Retrieved August 8, 2005.
- Willard, D. (1994). The natural Giant Sequoia groves of the Sierra Nevada, California - an updated annotated list. USDA Forest Service Gen. Tech. Rep. PSW-GTR-151: 159–164.
