= Pier Fire =

2017 wildfire in Central California

- Part of the 2017 California wildfires
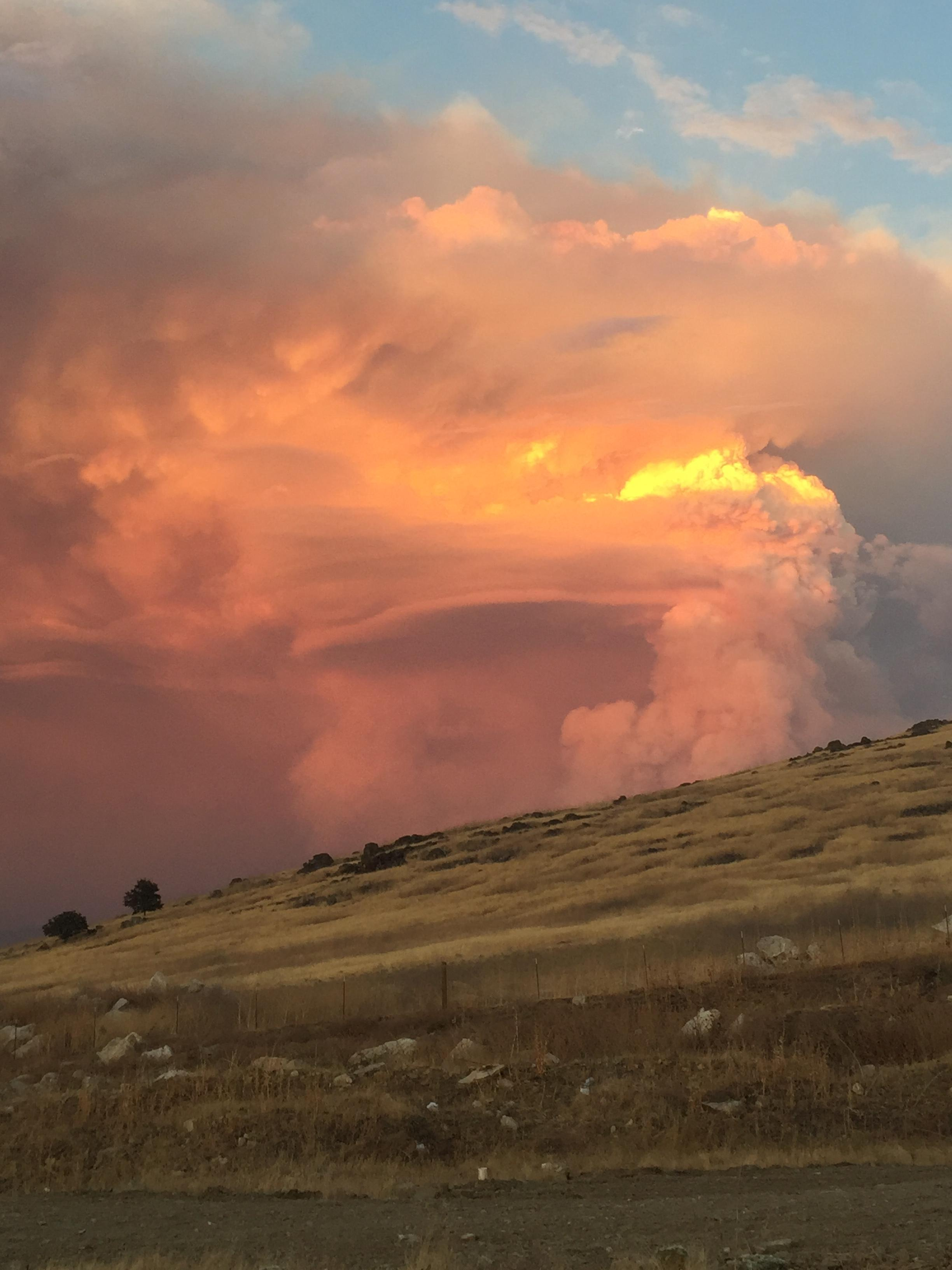
- Pier Fire on the evening of August 29, 2017
- Date: August 29, 2017 –; November 29, 2017
- Location: Sequoia National Forest, California, United States; Springville, California, United States
- Coordinates: 36.159°N 118.696°W

Statistics
- Burned area: 36,556 acres (148 km^{2})

Impacts
- Injuries: 5

Ignition
- Cause: Human caused

Map
- Location of fire in California.

The Pier Fire was a wildfire that burned near Springville and in the Sequoia National Forest, in California in the United States. The fire was reported on August 29, 2017. The cause of the fire is under investigation, but is believed to be human-caused. The fire was completely extinguished on November 29, after it had burned 36,556 acres (148 km^{2}). The fire threatened old growth sequoia trees, the Tule River Indian Reservation, and many small communities in the area.

== Progression ==
The Pier Fire was first reported on August 29 at 2:30 AM. The fire was spotted in the Tule River Canyon just north of Springville, California (reportedly, the fire was started by an individual or individuals who had stolen a car, set it on fire and pushed it into a ravine, which then caught fire. Since the site where the fire started was in a national forest, federal authorities along with state authorities are investigating). By the end of the day the fire had burned 1,650 acres (7 km^{2}) north and south of Highway 190 in Giant Sequoia National Monument in Sequoia National Forest. This led to numerous mandatory evacuations in the area and the closure of Highway 190 in select areas.

By August 30, the fire had grown to 4,655 acres (19 km^{2}) and threatened the Tule River Reservation and two groves of sequoia trees: Mountain Home Grove and Black Mountain Grove. Crews had limited access to the fire due to the steep slopes, heavy fuels and limited roads. Highway 190 remained closed in some sections and Balch Park and Mountain Home Demonstration State Forest were both closed.

On September 1, the fire grew to 10,311 acres (42 km^{2}). The fire jumped Highway 190 and the middle fork of the Tule River, nearing campgrounds. Additional crews were recruited due to the overwhelming nature of the fire, including CAL FIRE and Tulare County crews, totaling 1,243 individuals. More residents, specifically those residing on Balch Park and Bear Creek Roads were evacuated.

California Assemblyman Devon Mathis visited the incident command post for a site visit on September 2. That day, the fire had grown by approximately 4,000 acres, driven by dry fuels rather than the previous nights winds. On September 3, a Southern California Edison flume was destroyed in the fire, costing an estimated $3-$5 million to replace. Additionally, Southern California Edison also lost a valve house, six distribution poles and a transmission structure.

By September 11, the fire was declared to be 60% contained and at 27,586 acres (112 km^{2}). Evacuation status of Cow Mountain, Springville and Upper Rio Vista was downgraded to voluntary. Crews successfully controlled fires on the Tule River Tribe of the Tule River Reservation. On the evening of September 14, mandatory evacuations for the communities of Alpine Village, Camp Nelson, Cedar Slope, Doyle Springs, Mountain Aire, Rogers Camp, Pierpoint Springs, Sequoia Crest and Wishon were downgraded to voluntary.

IN mid-September 2017, fire crews were finishing up containment of spot fires near Pine Flat Road and will proceed to initiate firing operations and hand lines in Soda Springs on the Tule River Reservation, including structure protection.

On September 24, the Pier Fire's perimeter was 100% contained, with a total burn area of 36,556 acres (148 km^{2}). However, hot spots continued with burn within the fire perimeter for another couple of months, until they were extinguished by rainfall from a winter storm on November 29.

== Effects ==
=== Evacuations and closures ===
A portion of Highway 190 is closed to all traffic from the Tule Power House to Pierpoint Springs. Sequoia National Forest lands, trails and roads around the fire remain closed.

== See also ==
- 2017 California wildfires
