= Long Meadow Grove =

Giant sequoia grove in Tulare County, California, United States

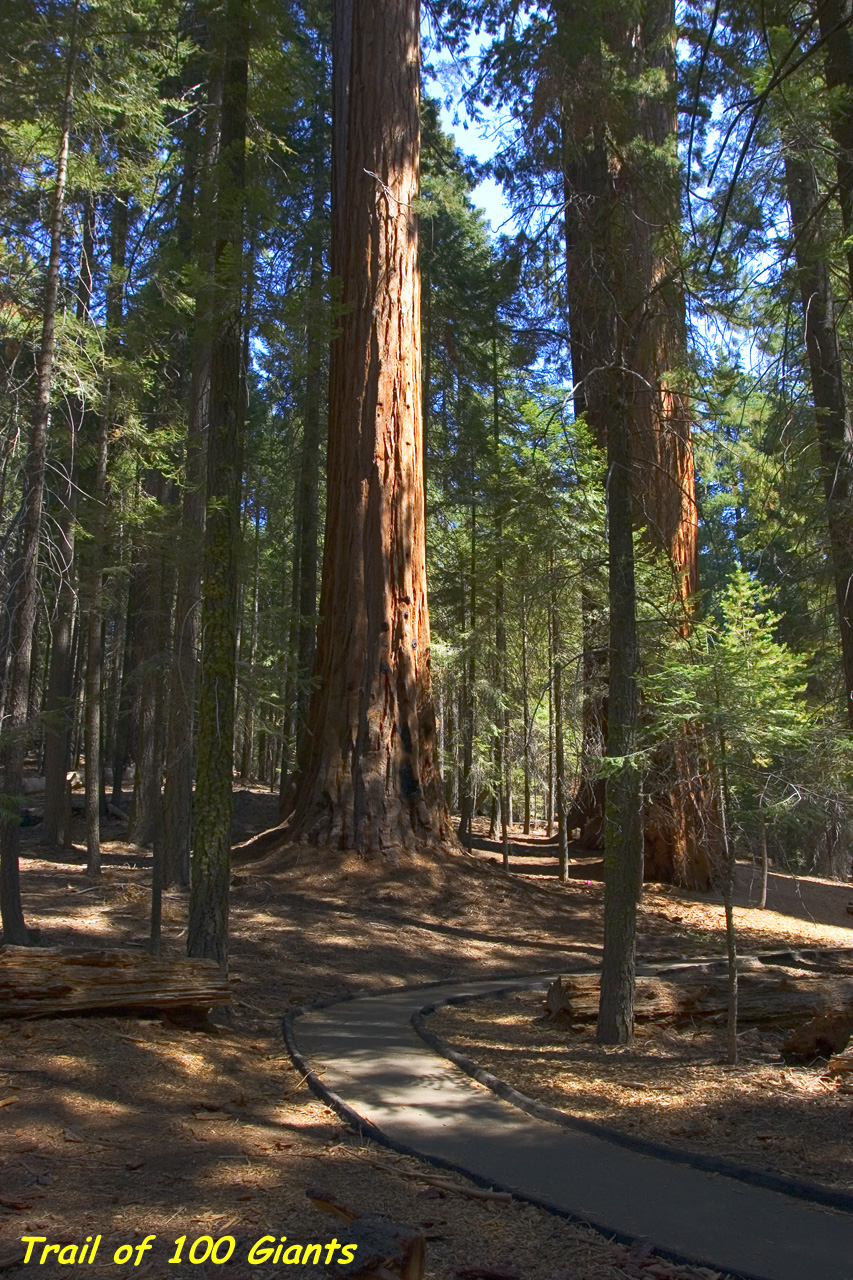
- The "Trail of 100 Giants"

- Location within California

Geography
- Location: Tulare County, California, United States
- Coordinates: 35°58′42″N 118°35′22″W
- Elevation: 6,690 ft (2,040 m)
- Area: 340 acres (140 ha)

Ecology
- Dominant tree species: Sequoiadendron giganteum

Long Meadow Grove, also known as Redwood Meadow Grove, is a giant sequoia grove located within Sequoia National Forest approximately 3.25 mi (5.23 km) west of Johnsondale, California. The grove is part of the southern section of Giant Sequoia National Monument and is administered by the U.S. Forest Service.

== Overview ==
Long Meadow Grove is located primarily on the west side of Western Divide Highway (M 107), directly across the road from Redwood Meadow Campground. The grove is relatively flat and easily accessible from the main road. It is best to visit in the summer when the road is open, or in the winter when accessible only by skis or snowmobile. A small vehicle fee is charged to help maintain and improve facilities at the grove, the most recent of which was the construction of a wooden boardwalk that was completed in 2018.

The grove itself is about 340 acres (1.4 km^{2}) large with giant sequoias found on considerably less acreage. Despite this, the grove is home to approximately 125 giant sequoias greater than 10 ft (3.0 m) in diameter and 1 giant sequoia greater than 20 ft (6.1 m) in diameter. A 1.3 mi (2.1 km) long interpretative trail called the Trail of 100 Giants that winds through the densest collection of old-growth giant sequoias found at the grove. A long grassy meadow bisects the grove.

== History ==
On April 15, 2000, then president Bill Clinton proclaimed the establishment of the Giant Sequoia National Monument from beneath what is now called the Proclamation Tree.

After the winter of 2003-2004, approximately 200 dead trees (none of which were giant sequoias) threatened the safety of visitors and forced the closure of the trail. On April 29, 2004, the Forest Service held a public meeting at the trail to see the hazard trees and to discuss public concerns and options. In May, a short portion of the trail was cleared and reopened while forest officials determined how best to remove the remaining hazards.

On August 23, 2004, the entire trail was closed so that remaining hazard trees could be removed. Extra measures were taken during the removal to protect the giant sequoias and local wildlife. Sequoia National Forest personnel felled the hazard trees and removed debris that could increase fire danger. Some logs were left to provide ecological benefits, some were chipped, and over 300 cords (over 1,087 cubic meters) of wood were made available to the public purchasing personal use firewood permits. Some limbs were piled and burned by fire crews. A helicopter was hired under contract to fly out some of the largest pieces of wood. On July 1, 2005, the trail reopened after it was repaired and rehabilitated.

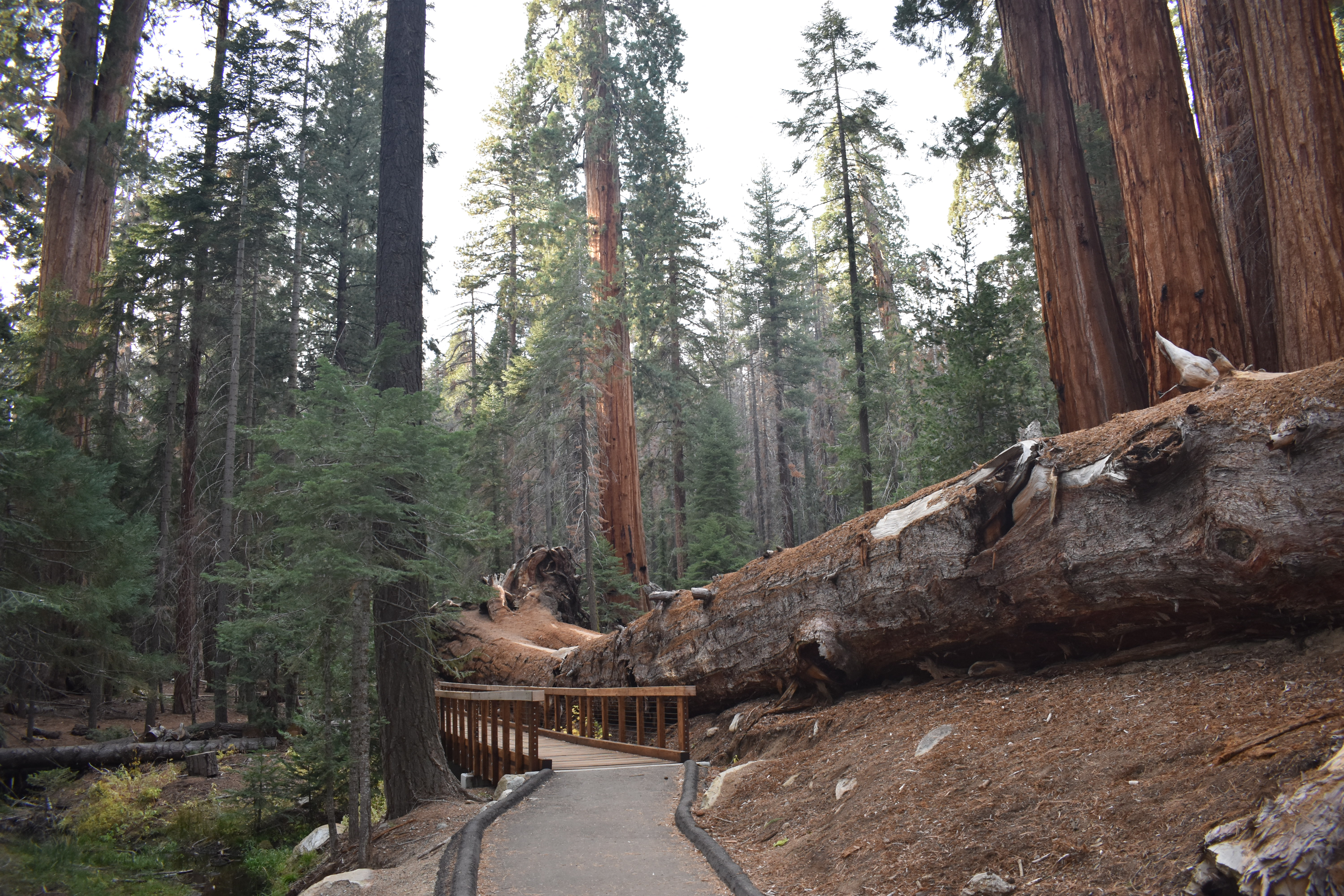
The collapsed pair of giant sequoias as seen in November 2017. A third giant sequoia (left, out of frame) collapsed across the northeast end boardwalk the following year.

On September 30, 2011, a pair of intertwined giant sequoias collapsed across the northernmost section of the main loop trail. Later, during the winter of 2018/19, another giant sequoia fell across the first two from the southwest, destroying part of the newly constructed boardwalk. Both events were determined to have been caused by heavy soil saturation during the unseasonably wet winters of 2010/2011 and 2018/19.

This grove was heavily impacted by the Windy Fire in 2021, with nearly a third of the grove burning at high severity. However, trees along the Trail of 100 Giants were saved by firefighters and previous prescribed burning operations.

== Noteworthy Trees ==
There are several noteworthy sequoias in this grove, including:

- Cedoia: a giant sequoia and a cedar tree growing together as one.
- Fallen Giant: a fallen giant sequoia that is slowly being reclaimed by the surrounding forest.
- Proclamation Tree: the tree under which then president Bill Clinton proclaimed the establishment of the Giant Sequoia National Monument on April 15, 2000.
- The Sentinels: a close circle of five giant sequoias growing together.
- Red Chief: one of the largest giant sequoias in the world with a volume of 28,723 cubic feet (813.3 m^{3}). Red Chief was documented by Wendell Flint and Mike Law in two editions of their book To Find the Biggest Tree (1987, 2002). In 1986, Red Chief was measured at 220.6 feet (67.24 m) tall and 20 feet (6.1 m) in diameter at breast height. Red Chief is located in a logged area in the upper portion of the grove. There is no trail leading to the tree. The sequoia survived the 2021 Windy Fire.

== See also ==
- List of giant sequoia groves
