= Deer Creek Grove =

Giant sequoia grove in Tulare County, California, United States

- Location within California

Geography
- Location: Tulare County, California, United States
- Coordinates: 35°52′19″N 118°36′12″W
- Elevation: 5,900 ft (1,800 m)

Ecology
- Dominant tree species: Sequoiadendron giganteum

Deer Creek Grove is a small giant sequoia grove located in the Deer Creek watershed of the Giant Sequoia National Monument in the western Sierra Nevada of California, near the end of a steep 0.8 mi (1.3 km) trail south from the end of Deer Creek Mill Road. It is the southernmost giant sequoia grove, about halfway up a pine-covered mountain that rises above a valley of grassy foothills and containing a scattering of old-growth giant sequoias on a sheltered east-facing slope.

While the present day distribution of this species is limited to a small area of California, it was once much more widely distributed in prehistoric times, and was a reasonably common species in North American and Eurasian coniferous forests until its range was greatly reduced by the last ice age.

Over half the grove burned in the Windy Fire in 2021.

== Noteworthy trees ==
- Wishbone Tree - a giant sequoia featuring a hole big enough to ride a horse through. The hole was formed by an intense wildfire sometime in the distant past.

== See also ==
- List of giant sequoia groves
