= Packsaddle Grove =

Giant sequoia grove in Tulare County, California, United States

- Location within California

Geography
- Location: Tulare County, California, United States
- Coordinates: 35°55′26″N 118°35′34″W
- Elevation: 6,760 ft (2,060 m)

Ecology
- Dominant tree species: Sequoiadendron giganteum

Packsaddle Grove is a medium-sized sequoia grove on Giant Sequoia National Monument located in the South Creek of the Kern River watershed. It is a fairly wet grove as it straddles Packsaddle Creek and its tributaries.

This compact grove is a rare example of an old growth forest where California condors have lived. The main access to this grove is via dirt roads and steep cross-country hiking. The grove can only be visited in the summer when the roads are open. The main option for seeing the grove itself is to hike cross-country through it.

This grove was heavily impacted by the Windy Fire in 2021, with over a third of the grove burning at high severity.

== Noteworthy trees ==
- Packsaddle Giant, which was killed in the Windy Fire. It had a volume of approx. 32,156 cubic feet (910.6 m^{3}) and the fourth-largest ground perimeter of any sequoia at 107 feet (33 m), making it the largest giant sequoia south of Stagg.
- Candelabra Tree, with a volume of 26,341 cubic feet (745.9 m^{3}), It has many large limbs that lead to a great crown of foliage.
- Ghost Tree (sometimes referred to as General Lee Tree, of which however exist several in different groves), a once much larger tree with a heavily broken top, but growing a new top shoot (leader). This tree has a volume of 25,047 cubic feet (709.3 m^{3}). It was heavily damaged in the Windy Fire.

== See also ==
- List of giant sequoia groves
