= Black Mountain Grove =

Giant sequoia grove in Tulare County, California, United States

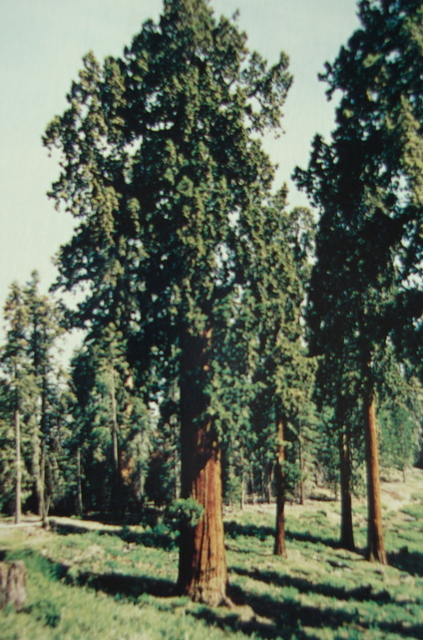
- Black Mountain Beauty, the largest tree in the grove

- Location within California

Geography
- Location: Tulare County, California, United States
- Coordinates: 36°06′16″N 118°39′19″W
- Elevation: 6,400 ft (2,000 m)
- Area: 3,310 acres (1,340 ha)

Ecology
- Dominant tree species: Sequoiadendron giganteum

Black Mountain Grove is a large sequoia grove containing more than 500 large trees, on the slopes of Black Mountain located between the Middle and South Forks of Tule River. It lies partly in the Tule River Indian Reservation. Black Mountain Grove is 19.3 miles long and is the sixth largest specimens in the world of all groves. It is dry and hot during summer time which is potentially negative to the forest because it is a higher risk for wildfires. During the winter time, it is cold and fresh. The Black Mountain Grove was a highlight in history because it was the conventional point to stop logging in groves. It played a significant role in the creation of Giant Sequoia National Monument.

The grove is partly on Giant Sequoia National Monument, Tule River Indian Reservation and in private ownership and contains old and young growth sequoias. The main access to this grove is by road or hiking across country. The grove is estimated at 3,310 acres (13.4 km^{2}) with sequoias sprawling across the divide forming the Middle and South Forks of the Tule River.

== History ==
In 1928, the wildfire burned more than 2,600 acres (11 km^{2}), which left a large clearing in the forest.

In 1987, a lawsuit was filed against the Solo Timber Sale by the Sierra Club to stop logging the groves. The judgement made for that lawsuit was that the groves would be restored to their natural state. The 1990 Mediated Settlement Agreement (MSA) to the Sustainable land management plan extended the grove boundaries and prohibited timber harvesting within the groves. In 1992, President Bush visited the large sequoias and boosted the terms by completely protecting them from harvesting, mining, and development.

In 2008, another wildfire burned about 12% of the grove.

In 2017, the Pier Fire burned through a large section of the grove. The fire killed 53 giant sequoias greater than 0.91 m (3.0 ft) in diameter, of which 31 were at least 3.05 m (10.0 ft) in diameter. The high mortality rate was caused by a combination of poor management of local fuel loads and climate change.

== Wildlife ==
Before there were laws to protect the trees in the grove, more than 500 acres of non-sequoia trees were destroyed, and more than 70% of the groves were logged. The forest still has many different kinds of species of trees standing including ponderosa pine trees, willow trees, dogwood trees, white fir trees, black oak trees, incense cedar trees, and the rarest of them all, the largest sugar pine tree located at the north side of the forest. The smaller plants underfoot are fern, grasses, and forbs.

== Wildfires ==
Black Mountain Grove gets fire threats from around the area; for example, from Long Canyon or South and Middle Fork. There was a lot of dead wood around Black Mountain Grove, the dead wood, or just the high fuel in general, has not been removed since 2003; which means, it would burn a good portion of the sequoias if it were to catch on fire. This high fuel load caused the MSA to demand a “fuel load reduction plan,” which included plans for logging. Unfortunately this dense fuel load would go on to fuel two devastating wildfires in 2008 and 2017.

Climate change has also been a contributing factor to an increase in the frequency and intensity of wildfires.

== Noteworthy trees ==
- Black Mountain Beauty: the largest known sequoia in the grove with a volume of 32,224 cubic feet (912.5 m^{3}).
- Patriarch II: the second largest giant sequoia of the grove.
- Blasted Mammoth: the third largest giant sequoia of the grove. The tree may have once been the largest tree in the grove. It is broken off about 90 feet (27 m) above the ground and is still alive.
- Flower Pot Tree: a giant sequoia with a Pacific dogwood growing out of its canopy.
- Snaggle-Top: a giant sequoia with a distinctive shape.
- Twisted Harlequin: a giant sequoia with red and pink-colored bark twisting up most of its height.

== See also ==
- List of giant sequoia groves
