= The Needles (Sequoia National Forest) =

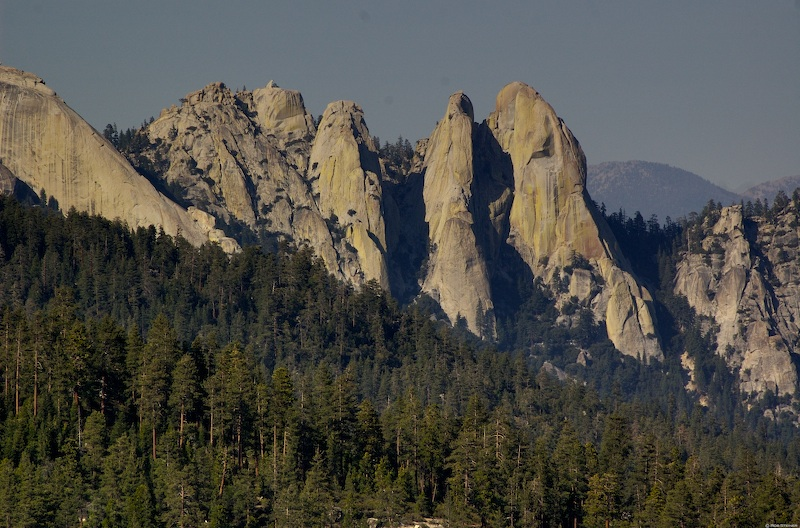
- The Needles from Dome Rock

Highest point
- Elevation: 8,258 ft (2,517 m) NAVD 88
- Prominence: 454 ft (138 m)
- Coordinates: 36°06′34″N 118°29′04″W

Geography
- Location within California
- Location: Tulare County, California, U.S.
- Parent range: Sierra Nevada
- Topo map: USGS Durrwood Creek

The Needles are a series of massive granite rock formations rising up from the North Fork of the Kern River near its junction with the Little Kern River.

== Background ==
The Needles Lookout is located 2.5 miles (4.0 km) off the Western Divide Highway, 10 miles (16 km) north of Mountain Road 50. Johnsondale, California is the nearest town, with Boy Scout Camp Whitsett around 4 miles (6.4 km) from Johnsondale. On July 28, 2011, the Needles lookout, constructed in 1937–1938 by the Civilian Conservation Corps, was destroyed in a structure fire. The lookout tower stood atop the rock formation at 8,245 feet (2,513 m).

== Gallery ==
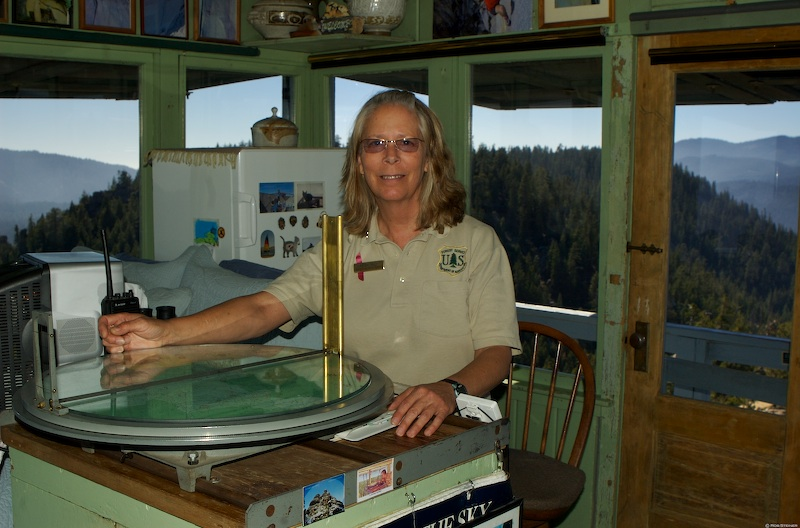
Margee Kelly has served as a Fire Lookout Ranger at The Needles for 20+ years.

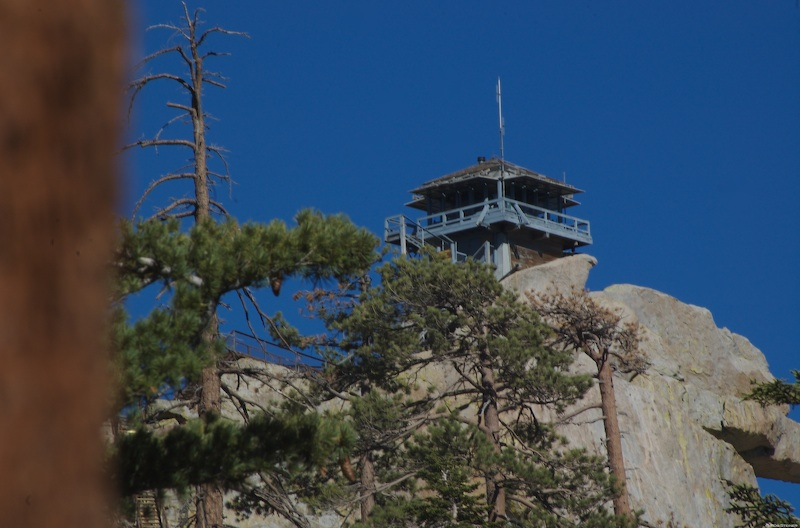
The Needles Lookout

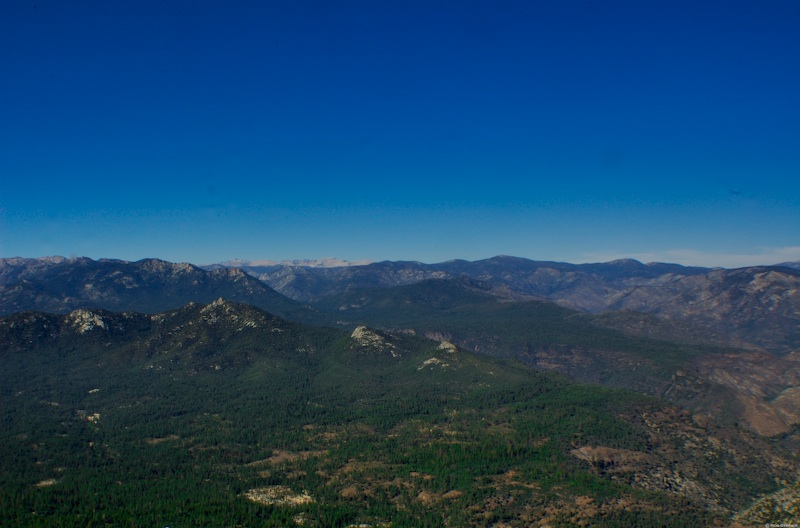
View NE over the Golden Trout Wilderness Area. Mount Whitney is visible in the distance.

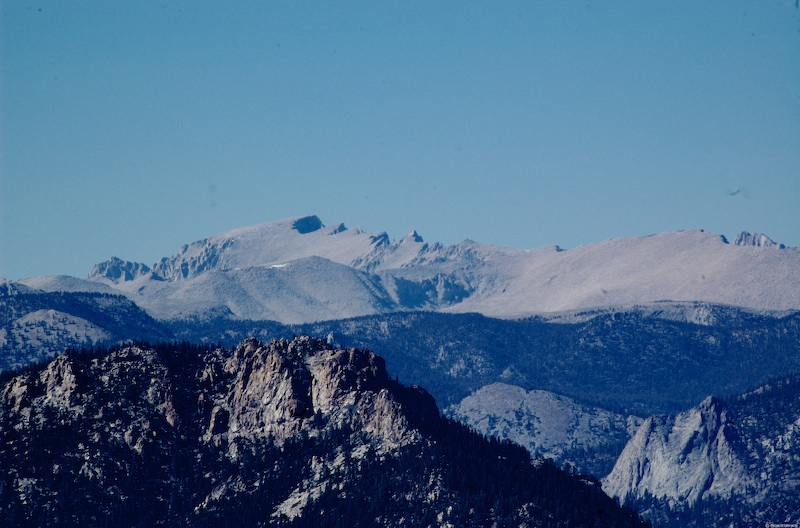
Mount Whitney from The Needles Lookout

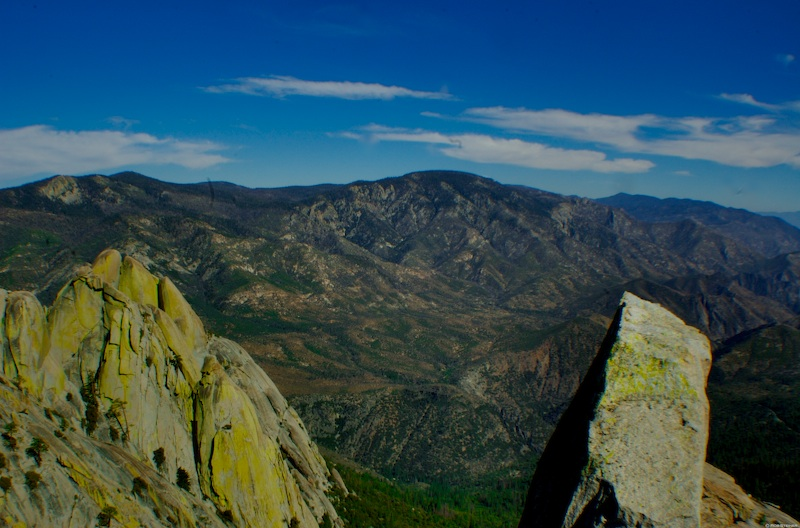
View SE from The Needles Lookout

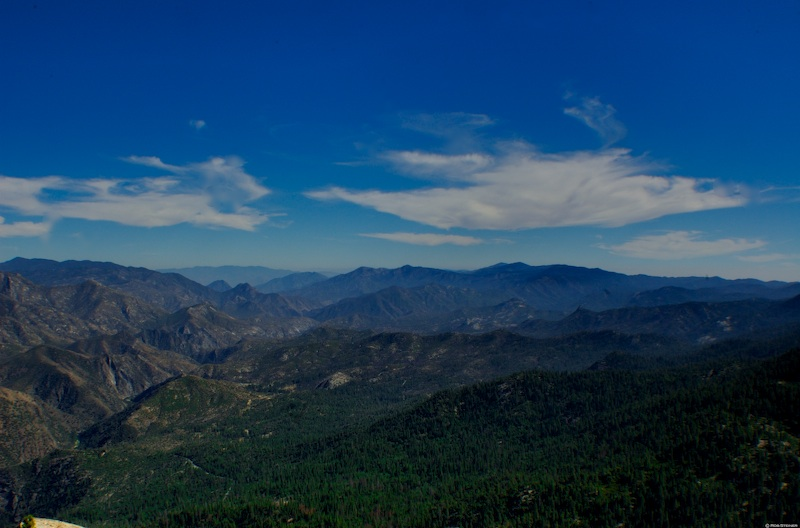
View S towards the Kern Canyon from The Needles Lookout

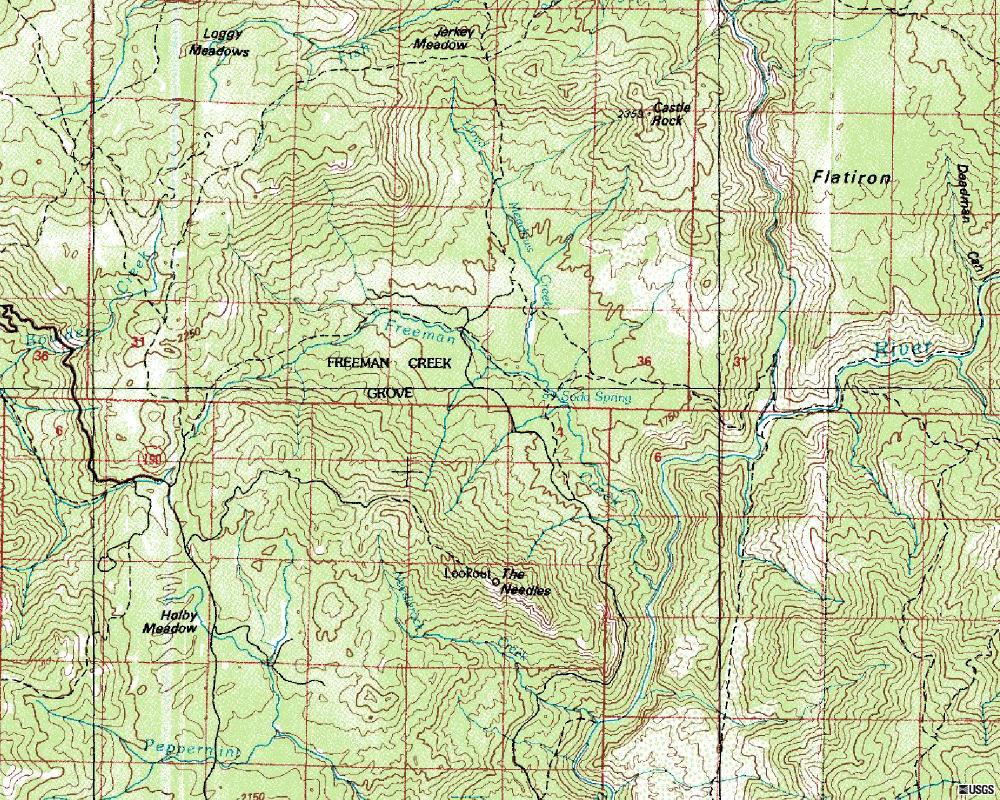
Map
