= Kern National Forest =

National forest in California, U.S.

Kern National Forest was established by the U.S. Forest Service in California on July 1, 1910 with 1,951,191 acres (7,896.19 km^{2}) from a portion of Sequoia National Forest and other lands. On July 1, 1915 the entire forest was transferred back to Sequoia and the name was discontinued.
