= Jennie Lakes Wilderness =

Protected wilderness area in California, United States

- IUCN category Ib (wilderness area)
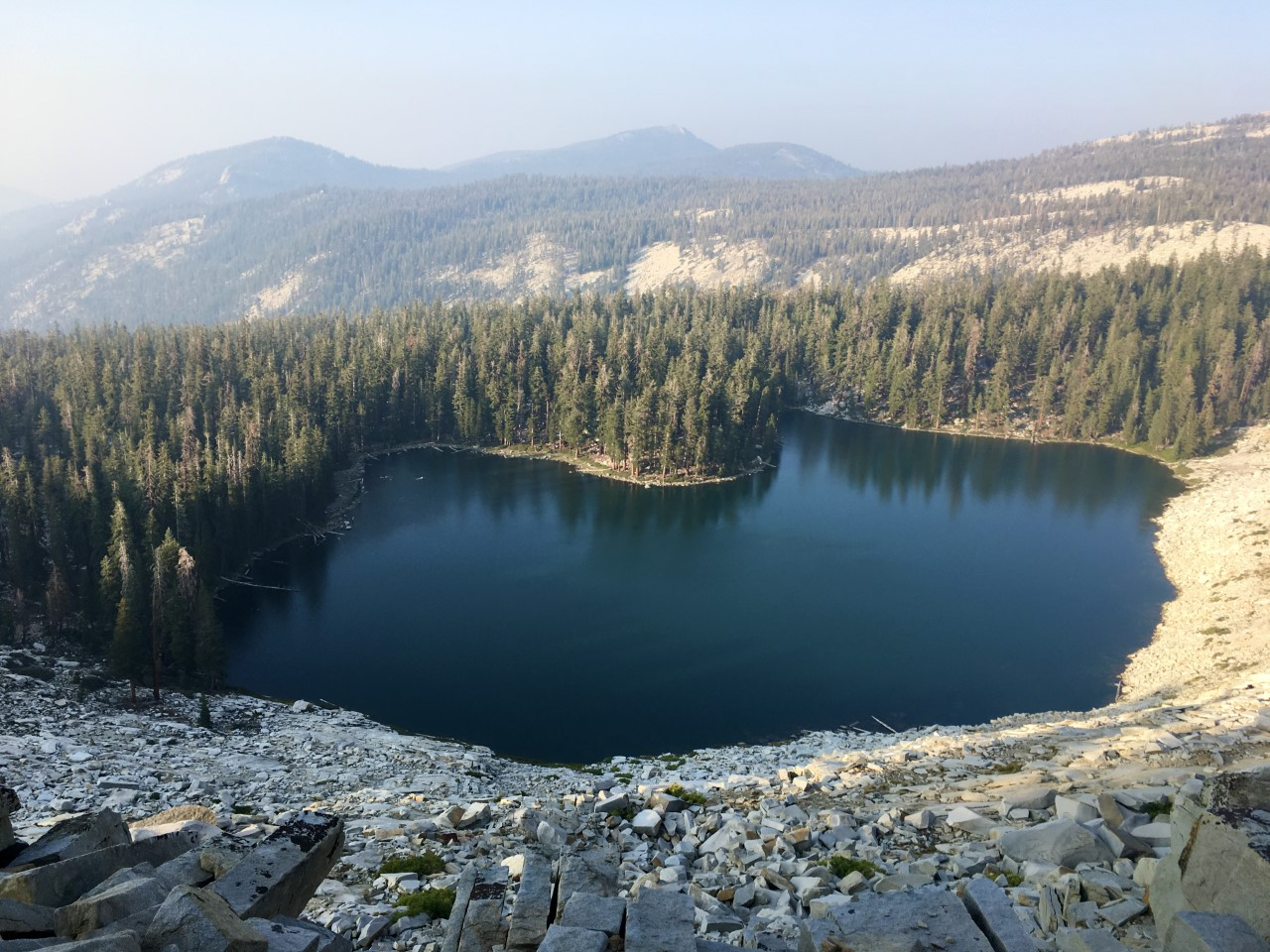
- Jennie Lake in August 2021

- Location within California Location within the United States
- Interactive map of Jennie Lakes Wilderness
- Location: Tulare County, California
- Nearest city: Fresno
- Coordinates: 36°41′00″N 118°40′00″W
- Area: 10,556 acres (42.72 km^{2})
- Established: 1984
- Governing body: U.S. Forest Service
- Website: Jennie Lakes Wilderness

Jennie Lakes Wilderness is a protected area in the Sierra Nevada, in Tulare County, California. It is located 60 miles (97 km) east of Fresno and managed by the US Forest Service. Jennie Lakes Wilderness is about nine square miles within the Sequoia National Forest, that was established by the California Wilderness Act of 1984, and added to the National Wilderness Preservation System.

The Jennie Lakes Wilderness is a classic high Sierra landscape. It is a 10,500-acre area with a mixture of lakes, mountain peaks, forests, meadows and streams, most of which is above 7,000 feet (2,100 meters) in elevation. The wilderness contains variations of alpine and sub-alpine forest. Lodgepole Pines, Red and White Firs and White (Mountain) Pine dominate the area, while Jeffrey Pines and a few juniper are also present. In the summer, wildflowers are common. Jennie Lake sits about 9,000 feet (2,700 meters) above sea level and Weaver Lake is slightly lower. The summit of Mitchell Peak is the highest point in the wilderness at 10,365 feet (3,159 meters) and features views of the surrounding area and of Kings Canyon National Park.

In the Jennie Lakes Wilderness, there are two principal lakes, Jennie Ellis Lake and Weaver Lake. Both lakes tend to be busy on weekends (especially holidays). Weaver Lake attracts many day hikers as it lies close to the trailhead. Jennie Lake is often a stop for hikers coming from or going into Sequoia National Park to the south. Smaller and more remote, there is also a pond above JO Pass about a mile east of Jennie Lake and "Poison Pond" sits about a half-mile south of Weaver Lake. Both have a few campsites around them. Jennie Lake was named by Sam Ellis for his wife, Jennie (Cortney) Ellis. Sam Ellis "discovered" the lake in 1890. He became the Chief Game Warden for Fresno County and led the initiative, beginning in 1914, to stock Golden trout in lakes and streams in the Sierra Nevada Bullard Family History.

== Geography ==
Jennie Lakes Wilderness is situated immediately north of Sequoia National Park and west of Kings Canyon National Park. The wilderness area is bisected by the Boulder Creek canyon that is 1,000 feet (300 m) deep. The eastern half is a high plateau bounded by a ridge and the western half is dominated by Shell Mountain 9,594 feet (2,924 m) as well as Weaver Lake. Elevations range from 6,640 to 10,365 feet (2,024 to 3,159 m) at Mitchell Peak. There are six lakes within the wilderness, with Jennie Lake the largest and highest in elevation at 9,000 feet (2,700 m). Boulder Creek flows from Jennie Lake and is a major tributary to the South Fork Kings River. Stony Creek begins south of Shell Mountain and flows into the North Fork Kaweah River.

== Ecology ==
Red fir and lodgepole pine are the primary forest cover with granitic outcroppings typical of the Sierra Nevada Mountains. Black bears are common in the area.

== Recreation ==
Recreational activities include day hiking, backpacking, horsepacking, fishing, and cross-country skiing. There are four trailheads that give access to 26 miles of trails as well as connecting walkers to the Sequoia & Kings Canyon National Park's backcountry - Big Meadow, Rowell Meadow, Marvin Pass and Stony Creek.

The Forest Service encourages the practice of Leave No Trace principles of outdoor travel to minimize human impact on the environment. Campers are expected to avoid camping within 100' of either of the main lakes. Due to growing overuse, a Forest Order is in effect during the busy summer season to help protect the riparian areas near the lakeshores.

== See also ==
- List of plants of the Sierra Nevada (U.S.)

== Footnotes ==
Adkinson, Ron Wild Northern California. The Globe Pequot Press, 2001
