= Springville, California =

Springville
- Unincorporated Community; Census Designated Place
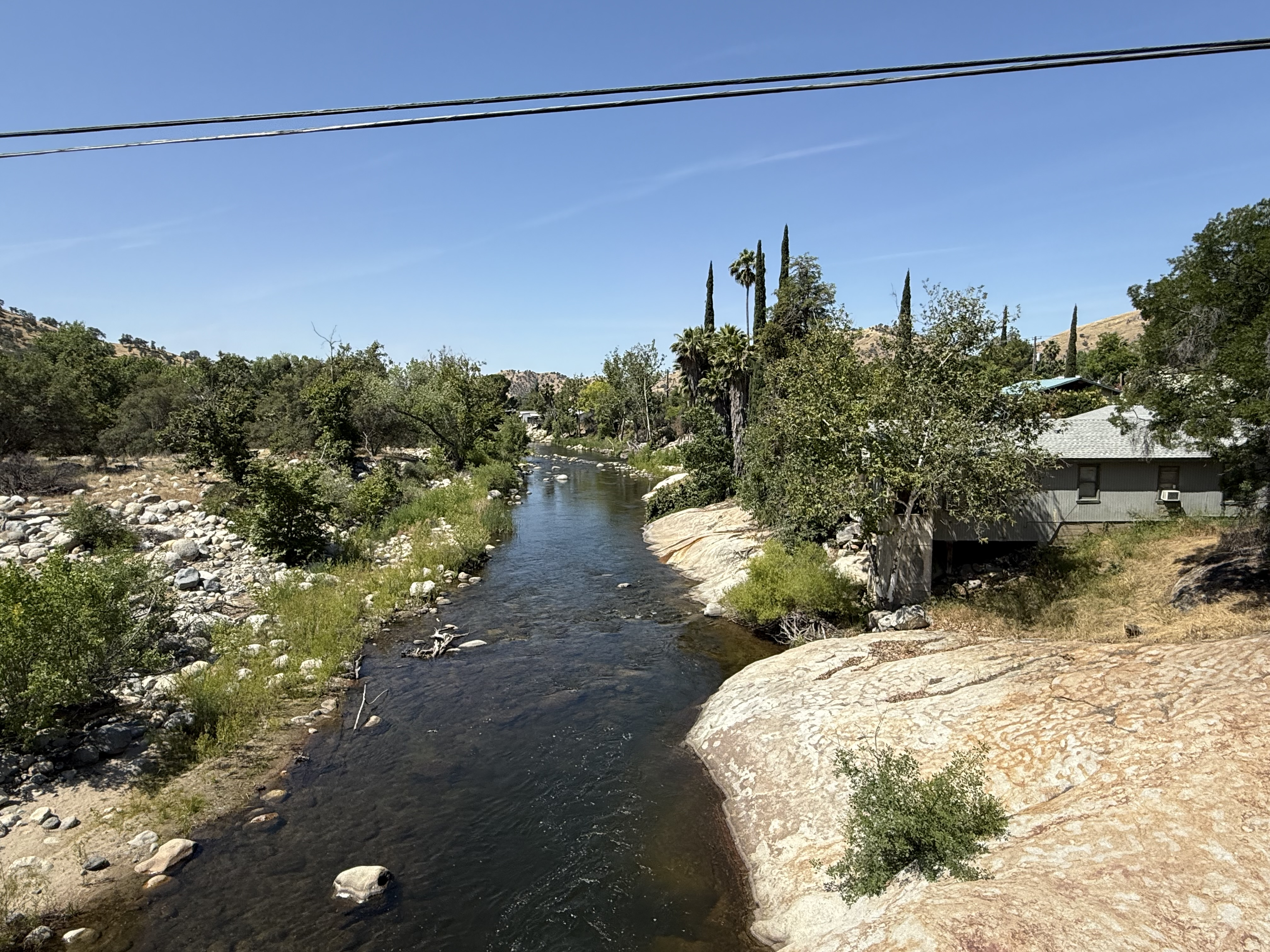
- Tule River

- Location in Tulare County and the state of California

- Location in the United States
- Coordinates: 36°7′42″N 118°49′8″W
- Country: United States
- State: California
- County: Tulare

Area
  - Total: 4.200 sq mi (10.878 km^{2})
  - Land: 4.183 sq mi (10.834 km^{2})
  - Water: 0.017 sq mi (0.044 km^{2}) 0.41%
- Elevation: 1,024 ft (312 m)

Population (2020)
  - Total: 967
  - Density: 231/sq mi (89.3/km^{2})
- Time zone: UTC-8 (Pacific (PST))
  - Summer (DST): UTC-7 (PDT)
- ZIP codes: 93208, 93265
- Area code: 559
- FIPS code: 06-73710
- GNIS feature ID: 0249828

Springville is a census-designated place (CDP) in Tulare County, California, United States. The population was 967 at the 2020 census, up from 934 at the 2010 census. The original name of the town was “Daunt”, after William Daunt, a settler who opened the first store in the town in 1860. The name was changed to “Springville” in January, 1911, in reference to the soda springs found in the area.

== Geography ==
Springville is located at 36°7′42″N 118°49′8″W (36.128378, -118.819001).

According to the United States Census Bureau, the CDP has a total area of 4.2 square miles (11 km^{2}), of which 4.2 square miles (11 km^{2}) is land and 0.02 square miles (0.052 km^{2}) (0.41%) is water.

=== Climate ===
This region experiences warm and dry summers, during which the temperature can reach above 100 F. According to the Köppen Climate Classification system, Springville has a warm-summer Mediterranean climate, abbreviated "Csb" on climate maps. Csb = Warm-summer Mediterranean climate; coldest month averaging above 0 °C (32 °F) (or −3 °C (27 °F)), all months with average temperatures below 22 °C (72 °F), and at least four months averaging above 10 °C (50 °F). At least three times as much precipitation in the wettest month of winter as in the driest month of summer, and driest month of summer receives less than 30 mm (1.2 in).

== Demographics ==
Historical population
Census	Pop.	Note	%±
2000	1,109		—
2010	934		−15.8%
2020	967		3.5%
U.S. Decennial Census; 1860–1870 1880-1890; 1900 1910 1920; 1930 1940 1950; 1960 1970 1980; 1990 2000 2010

Springville first appeared as a census designated place in the 2000 U.S. census.

=== 2020 ===
The 2020 United States census reported that Springville had a population of 967. The population density was 636.6 inhabitants per square mile (245.8/km^{2}). The racial makeup of Springville was 767 (79.3%) White, 2 (0.2%) African American, 13 (1.3%) Native American, 14 (1.4%) Asian, 0 (0.0%) Pacific Islander, 76 (7.9%) from other races, and 95 (9.8%) from two or more races. Hispanic or Latino of any race were 170 persons (17.6%).

The whole population lived in households. There were 452 households, out of which 84 (18.6%) had children under the age of 18 living in them, 160 (35.4%) were married-couple households, 39 (8.6%) were cohabiting couple households, 141 (31.2%) had a female householder with no partner present, and 112 (24.8%) had a male householder with no partner present. 174 households (38.5%) were one person, and 90 (19.9%) were one person aged 65 or older. The average household size was 2.14. There were 240 families (53.1% of all households).

The age distribution was 195 people (20.2%) under the age of 18, 41 people (4.2%) aged 18 to 24, 181 people (18.7%) aged 25 to 44, 299 people (30.9%) aged 45 to 64, and 251 people (26.0%) who were 65 years of age or older. The median age was 50.7 years. For every 100 females, there were 91.1 males.

There were 555 housing units at an average density of 365.4 units per square mile (141.1 units/km^{2}), of which 452 (81.4%) were occupied. Of these, 239 (52.9%) were owner-occupied, and 213 (47.1%) were occupied by renters.

=== 2010 ===
At the 2010 census Springville had a population of 934. The population density was 222.4 inhabitants per square mile (85.9/km^{2}). The racial makeup of Springville was 836 (89.5%) White, 5 (0.5%) African American, 20 (2.1%) Native American, 7 (0.7%) Asian, 0 (0.0%) Pacific Islander, 25 (2.7%) from other races, and 41 (4.4%) from two or more races. Hispanic or Latino of any race were 109 people (11.7%).

The whole population lived in households, no one lived in non-institutionalized group quarters and no one was institutionalized.

There were 427 households, 96 (22.5%) had children under the age of 18 living in them, 181 (42.4%) were opposite-sex married couples living together, 39 (9.1%) had a female householder with no husband present, 21 (4.9%) had a male householder with no wife present. There were 17 (4.0%) unmarried opposite-sex partnerships, and 4 (0.9%) same-sex married couples or partnerships. 156 households (36.5%) were one person and 53 (12.4%) had someone living alone who was 65 or older. The average household size was 2.19. There were 241 families (56.4% of households); the average family size was 2.85.

The age distribution was 173 people (18.5%) under the age of 18, 62 people (6.6%) aged 18 to 24, 161 people (17.2%) aged 25 to 44, 343 people (36.7%) aged 45 to 64, and 195 people (20.9%) who were 65 or older. The median age was 50.3 years. For every 100 females, there were 95.0 males. For every 100 females age 18 and over, there were 87.4 males.

There were 516 housing units at an average density of 122.9 per square mile, of the occupied units 264 (61.8%) were owner-occupied and 163 (38.2%) were rented. The homeowner vacancy rate was 3.3%; the rental vacancy rate was 15.1%. 581 people (62.2% of the population) lived in owner-occupied housing units and 353 people (37.8%) lived in rental housing units.

=== 2000 ===
At the 2000 census, the median household income was $24,271 and the median family income was $35,000. Males had a median income of $34,375 versus $31,406 for females. The per capita income for the CDP was $19,695. About 21.6% of families and 25.7% of the population were below the poverty line, including 42.5% of those under age 18 and 10.7% of those age 65 or over.

== Politics ==
In the state legislature Springville is located in the 12th Senate District, represented by Republican Shannon Grove, and in the 32nd Assembly District, represented by Republican Stan Ellis.

In the United States House of Representatives, Springville is in California's 20th congressional district, represented by Republican Vince Fong.

== Natural history ==
The rare wildflower Clarkia springvillensis was discovered near and named after Springville in 1964.

== Education ==
Springville is served by the Springville Union Elementary School District as well as the Porterville Unified School District for secondary school.

== Fictional references ==
In the science fiction novel Lucifer's Hammer, written by Larry Niven and Jerry Pournelle, fragments of a comet strike the Earth, causing massive tidal waves to destroy most of the planet's coastal cities. Los Angeles is completely destroyed, and the collapse of dams throughout California causes the San Joaquin Valley to become an inland sea. The second half of this novel focuses on an enclave of civilization in the fictional "Silver Valley", located slightly east or northeast of Springville, and just north of the Middle Fork of the Tule River.

Several key scenes in Alfred Hitchcock's Saboteur (1942) take place at a ranch in Springville.

== See also ==
- Pier Fire
