= Johnsondale, California =

Unincorporated community in California, United States

- Unincorporated community
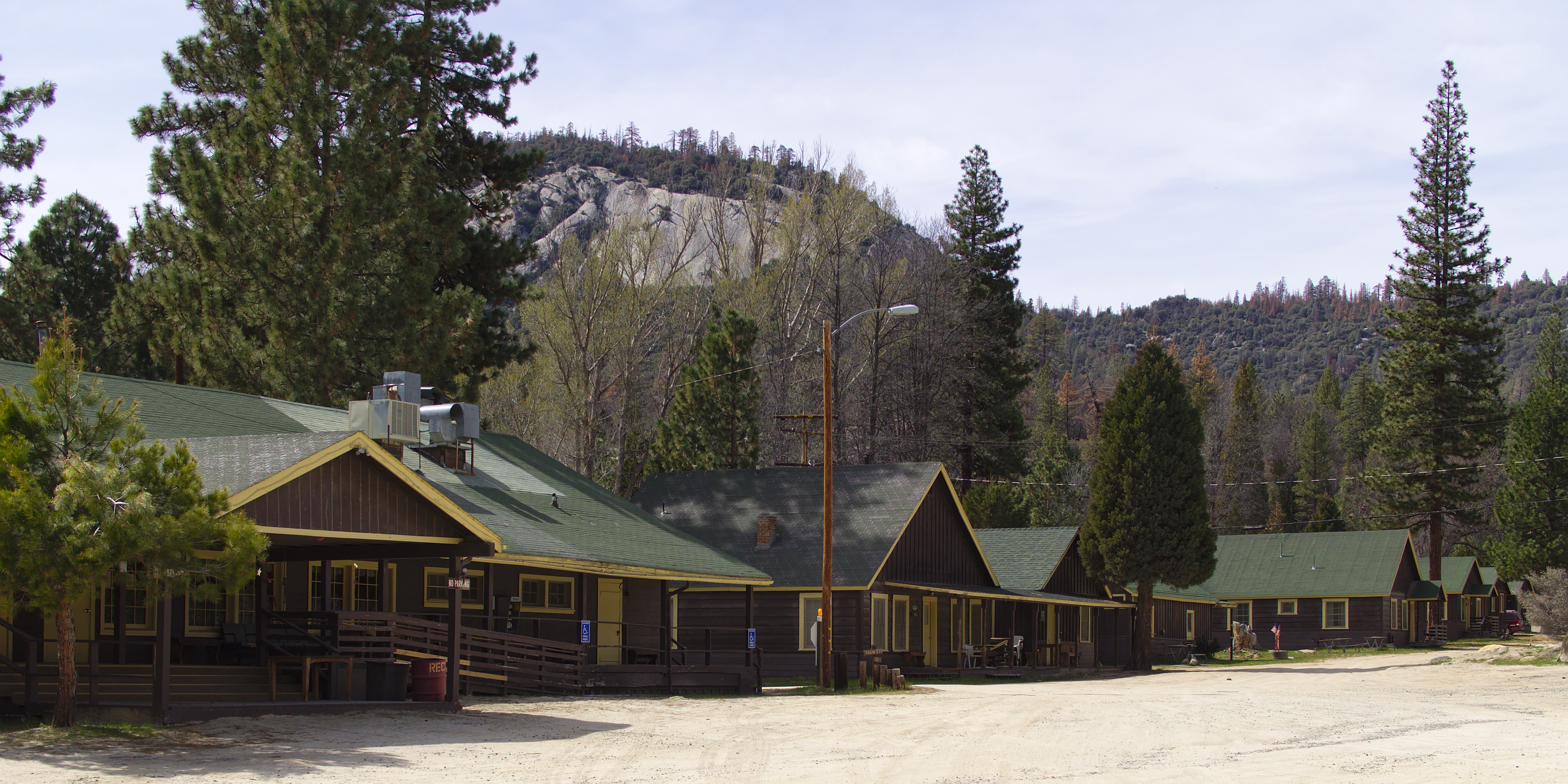
- Store and cabins at Johnsondale

- Location within California Location within the United States
- Coordinates: 35°58′29″N 118°32′27″W
- Country: United States
- State: California
- County: Tulare
- Elevation: 4,711 ft (1,436 m)
- Time zone: UTC-8 (Pacific (PST))
  - Summer (DST): UTC-7 (PDT)
- Area code: 559
- GNIS feature ID: 1660818

Johnsondale is an unincorporated community in Tulare County, California, United States. Johnsondale is 20 miles (32 km) northeast of California Hot Springs. A post office opened in Johnsondale in 1939. The Post Office was closed on September 19, 1980. The community is named after Walter S. Johnson of the Mount Whitney Lumber Company.

== Climate ==
According to the Köppen Climate Classification system, Johnsondale has a semi-arid climate, abbreviated "BSk" on climate maps.
