= Tule River Indian Tribe of the Tule River Reservation =

Federally recognized tribe and reservation in California, U.S.

Coordinates: 36°01′53″N 118°42′54″W

Tule River Reservation
- Native American Reservation
- Tule River Indian Tribe of the Tule River Reservation
- Location of the Tule River Reservation in California
- Established: 1873
- 9 member seated Government: East of Porterville, CA

Government
  - Type: Tule River Tribal Council
  - Chairman: Lester Shine Nieto
  - Vice-Chairman: Franklin Carabay
  - Secretary: Amanda Sierra
  - Treasurer: Michele McDarment
  - Members: Neil Peyron, Charmaine McDarment, Heather Teran, Nick Martinez, Douglas Vera

Area
  - Total: 218.3 km^{2} (84.29 sq mi)
  - Land: 218.3 km^{2} (84.29 sq mi)

Population
  - Total: 1,049
- Website: https://tulerivertribe-nsn.gov/

The Tule River Indian Tribe of the Tule River Reservation is a federally recognized tribe of Native Americans. The Tule River Reservation is located in Tulare County, California. The reservation was made up of Yokuts, about 200 Yowlumne, Wukchumnis, and Western Mono and Tübatulabal. Tribal enrollment today is approximately 1,857 with 1,033 living on the Reservation.

== History ==
=== Tule River Farm ===
For thousands of years, this area was inhabited by varying cultures of indigenous peoples. Historic tribes encountered by Europeans in the area included the Yokuts, Mono and Tübatulabal. The area was first colonized by the Spanish and Mexicans, followed by European Americans after the US victory in the Mexican–American War in 1848.

After the Owens Valley Indian War and following the Tule River Indian War of 1856, the Tule River Farm, a farm attached to the Tejon Agency, was established in 1858 at the base of the foothills, near the present town of Porterville. The farm was established on 1,280 acres (5.2 km^{2}) on the South Fork of Tule River. In 1860, Thomas Madden, an Indian service employee, gained personal title to the Tule River Farm, by using state school warrants. The federal government rented the Tule River Farm and paid Madden $1,000 per year.

=== Tule River Reservation ===
In 1864, the Tule River Farm became the Tule River Reservation, one of five Indian reservations authorized by Congress. When the United States defeated Half the Owens Valley Paiutes in the Owens Valley Indian War of 1863, they were removed to the reservation, whose population nearly doubled. In 1864, the population consisted of 450 Tule River Indians and 350 Owens River Indians who were relocated there from Fort Tejon.

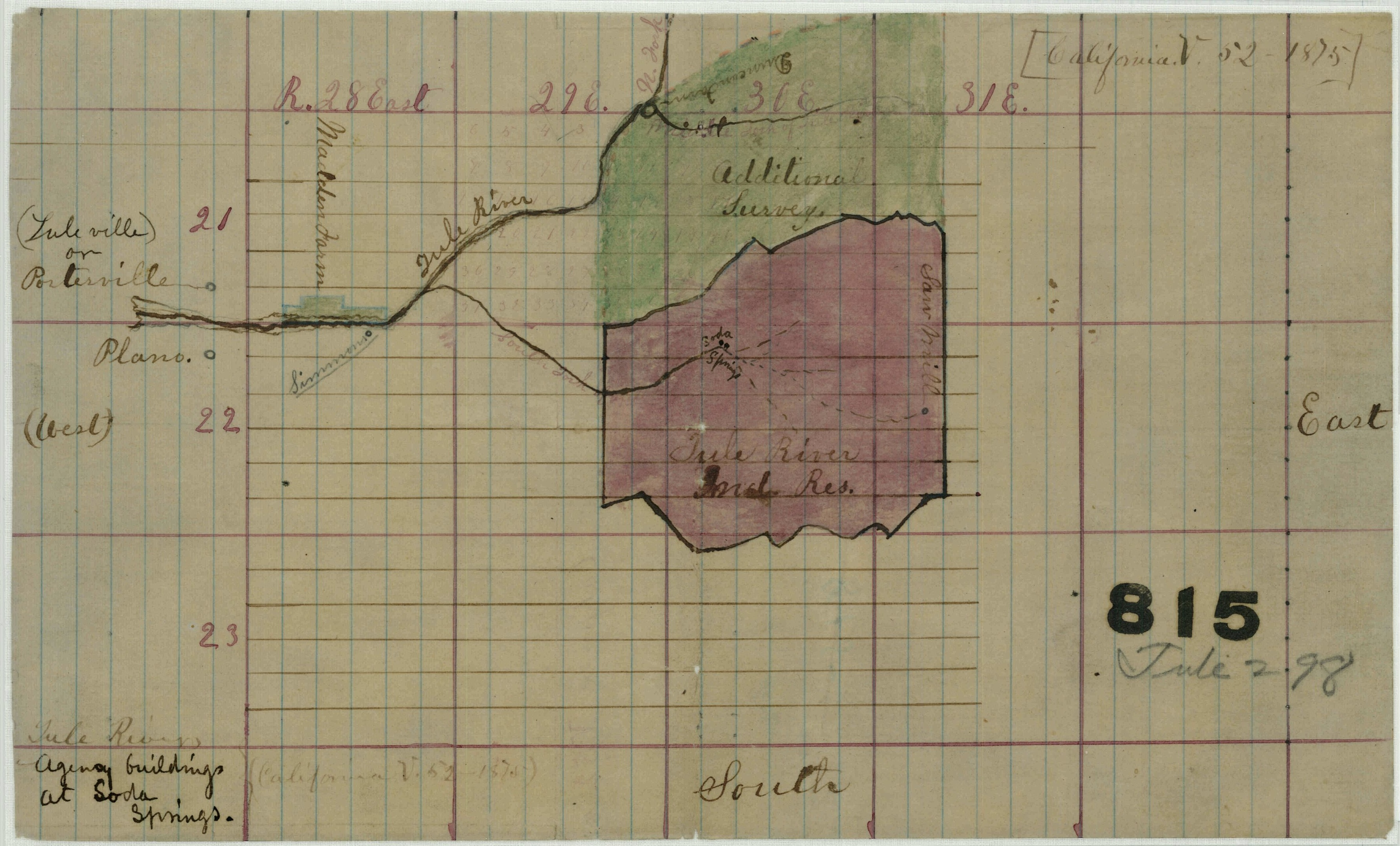
1875 survey of Tule River Indian Reservation (NAID 50926134)

The Owens Valley Paiutes were frightening settlers around the growing town of Porterville. The settlers began to demand removal of the Indians on the Tule River Farm to a more distant location. Indian agents clamored to provide the Indians with a more permanent home. Some also argued the need to separate the Indians from unscrupulous individuals who entered the reservation to entice the Indians to buy cheap liquor. As a result, the Tule River Indian Reservation was relocated; in 1873 it was established by Presidential Executive Order of Ulysses S. Grant as a homeland for Tule River, Kings River, Owens River, Monache Cajon and other scattered bands of Indians.

Traditionally, 60 Yokuts tribes lived-in south-central California to the east of Porterville. By the end of the 19th century their population was reduced by 75% due to warfare and high fatalities from European diseases. The surviving Yokuts banded together on the Tule River Reservation, including the Yowlumne, Wukchumni bands of Yokut. While the Tule River Indian Tribe includes Owens valley Paiutes and Tübatulabal members, the majority of the tribe are Yokuts. In 1917, some Kitanemuk people also lived in the reservation.

== Government ==
The tribe ratified their current tribal constitution in 1936 and last amended it in 1974. Their Tribal Council is democratically elected and includes a chairman, Vice Chairman, Secretary, and Treasurer and five Council Members. The Tule River Tribal Council Consists of nine council members. Each member is voted for by the Tule River Tribal Members. The elected officials then decide who will perform functions of chairman, Vice Chairman, Secretary and Treasurer.

The main piece of governing legislation is the Tule River Indian Tribe Constitution and Bylaws approved January 15, 1936.

== Reservation ==
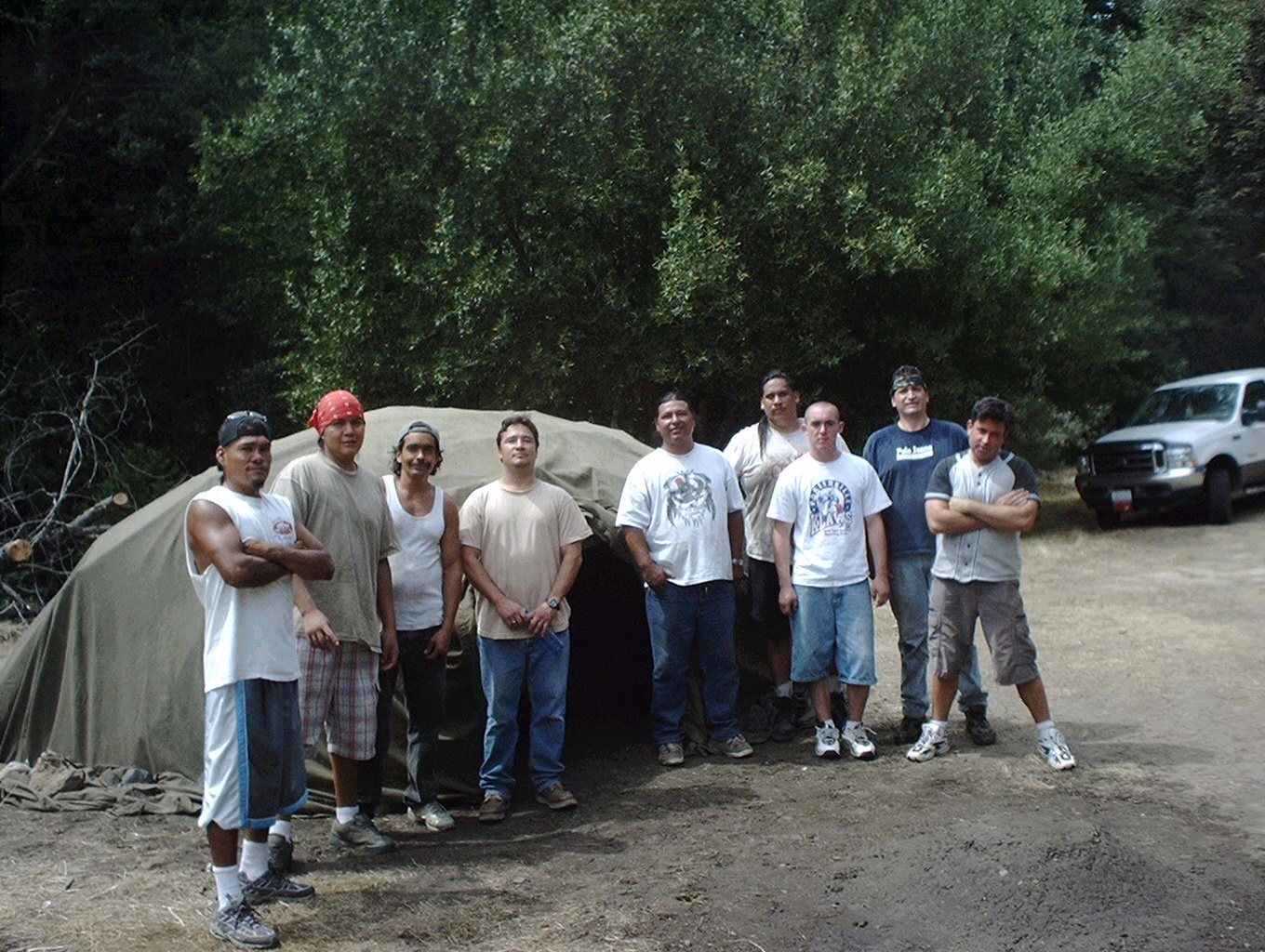
Yokuts and Miwok men outside of a sweat lodge on the Tule River Reservation, 2007

The Tule River Reservation was established in 1873 by a US Executive Order in the foothills of the Sierra Nevada. The reservation is the site of Painted Rock, an ancient petroglyph site. Located south of Fresno and north of Bakersfield, it occupies 55,356 acres (224.02 km^{2}). 566 tribal members live on the reservation. Accessible only by one winding 15-mile paved road (24 km) up into the mountains, the nearest town is East Porterville and/or Springville.

Due to the failure of wells in August 2022, families on the reservation had to use bottled water for drinking, cooking, and bathing.

== Programs ==
The tribe operates many programs to serve its members including a health clinic, a child care center, an adult and vocational education center, a college scholarship program, a housing authority, and a chemical dependency treatment center.

=== Healthcare ===
The Tule River Indian Health Center is a 501 (c) (3) non-profit organization founded in 1973 and dedicated to meeting the healthcare and health education needs of the Native American communities in Tulare County.

Tule River Indian Health Center is governed by a Health Advisory Board composed of local tribal members from the Tule River Indian Reservation.

=== Ecology ===
The Forest Service signed a co-stewardship agreement in 2022 with the tribe for incorporation of tribal practices into management of the Sequoia National Forest. As of 2025, they have committed to restoring the environment of their expanded reservation lands. In partnership with the California Department of Fish and Wildlife, they have released beaver and tule elk.

== Economy ==
=== Eagle Mountain Casino ===
On April 6, 2021, Tule River Tribe broke ground on the new property for Eagle Mountain Casino, to be moved from the reservation to Porterville. It opened in fall 2023.

=== Eagle Feather Trading Post ===
Eagle Feather Trading Post is one of the largest convenience stores in Tulare County, located on Hwy 190 just above Lake Success.

== Culture ==
Many of the stories told by the elders of the Tule River Indian reservation have been handed down from generation to generation. Almost all of these stories reflect the ways and life of the Tule River Tribes. All of the stories carry a strong message to the youth and adults in the region. Significant historical facts on these stories come from Painted Rock, a remarkable set of pictographs along the South Fork Tule River, at 1,608 feet (490 m) on the Tule Indian Reservation.

- Painted Rock
- Coyote and the Moon
- Coyote and the Sun
- Big Foot, The Hairy Man
- Soda Springs

== Education ==
The reservation is mostly served by the Porterville Unified School District with a small portion of it served by the Springville Union Elementary School District.

== See also ==
- Sebastian Indian Reservation
- Tejon Indian Tribe of California
