= Giant Sequoia National Monument =

National monument in the United States

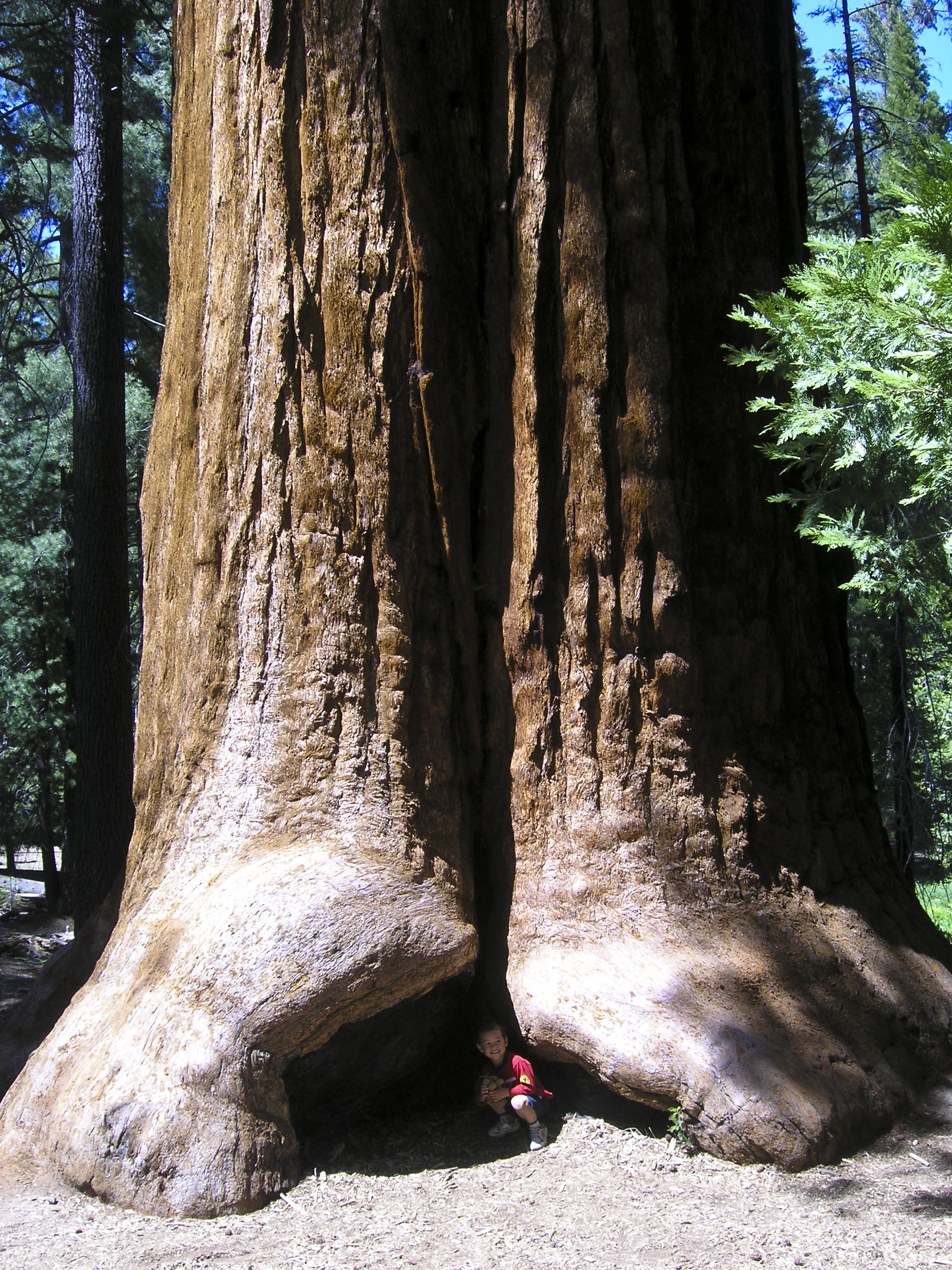
- The Proclamation Tree, a giant sequoia under which Giant Sequoia National Monument was established.

- Location within California Location within the United States
- Interactive map of Giant Sequoia National Monument
- Location: Tulare / Fresno / Kern counties, California, United States
- Nearest city: Porterville, CA
- Coordinates: 36°2′24″N 118°30′16″W
- Area: 328,315 acres (132,864 ha)
- Created: April 15, 2000
- Governing body: U.S. Forest Service
- Website: Giant Sequoia National Monument

U.S. National Monument

The Giant Sequoia National Monument is a 328,315-acre (512.992 sq mi) U.S. National Monument located in the southern Sierra Nevada in eastern central California. It is administered by the U.S. Forest Service as part of the Sequoia National Forest and includes 38 of the 39 Giant Sequoia (Sequoiadendron giganteum) groves that are located in the Sequoia National Forest, about half of the sequoia groves currently in existence, including one of the ten largest Giant Sequoias, the Boole Tree, which is 269 feet (82 m) high with a base circumference of 112 feet (34 m). The forest covers 824 square miles (2,130 km^{2}).

The monument is split in two portions: the Northern Portion and the Southern Portion. The northern section surrounds General Grant Grove and other parts of Kings Canyon National Park and is administered by the Hume Lake Ranger District. The southern section contains 20 groves east of Porterville and Springville, including Long Meadow Grove, Belknap Grove, Tule River Canyon, Trail of 100 Giants, and Freeman Creek Grove. This section is directly south of Sequoia National Park and is administered by the Western Divide Ranger District, surrounding the eastern half of the Tule River Indian Reservation.

The Giant Sequoia National Monument was created by President Bill Clinton in Proclamation 7295 on April 15, 2000, and published as 65 FR 24095 on April 25. The goal with this monument was to protect the ancient sequoia grovers and ecosystems in California's Sierra Nevada from harmful and destructive commercial logging and development.

In August 2023, gray wolves reappeared at Giant Sequoia National Monument for the first time in more than 100 years.

== Native history ==
The Giant Sequoias were found by European settlers in the mid 1800s, but were home to the Native American tribes of the region before European discovery. The Western Mono (also called Monache) lived in the western slopes of the Sierra Nevada and shared a deep connection with these trees. They relied on the giant sequoias for food, shelter, and even cultural practices. Descendants from this tribe, alongside other tribes found in the nearby areas, tend to the Sequoia land.

== Management ==
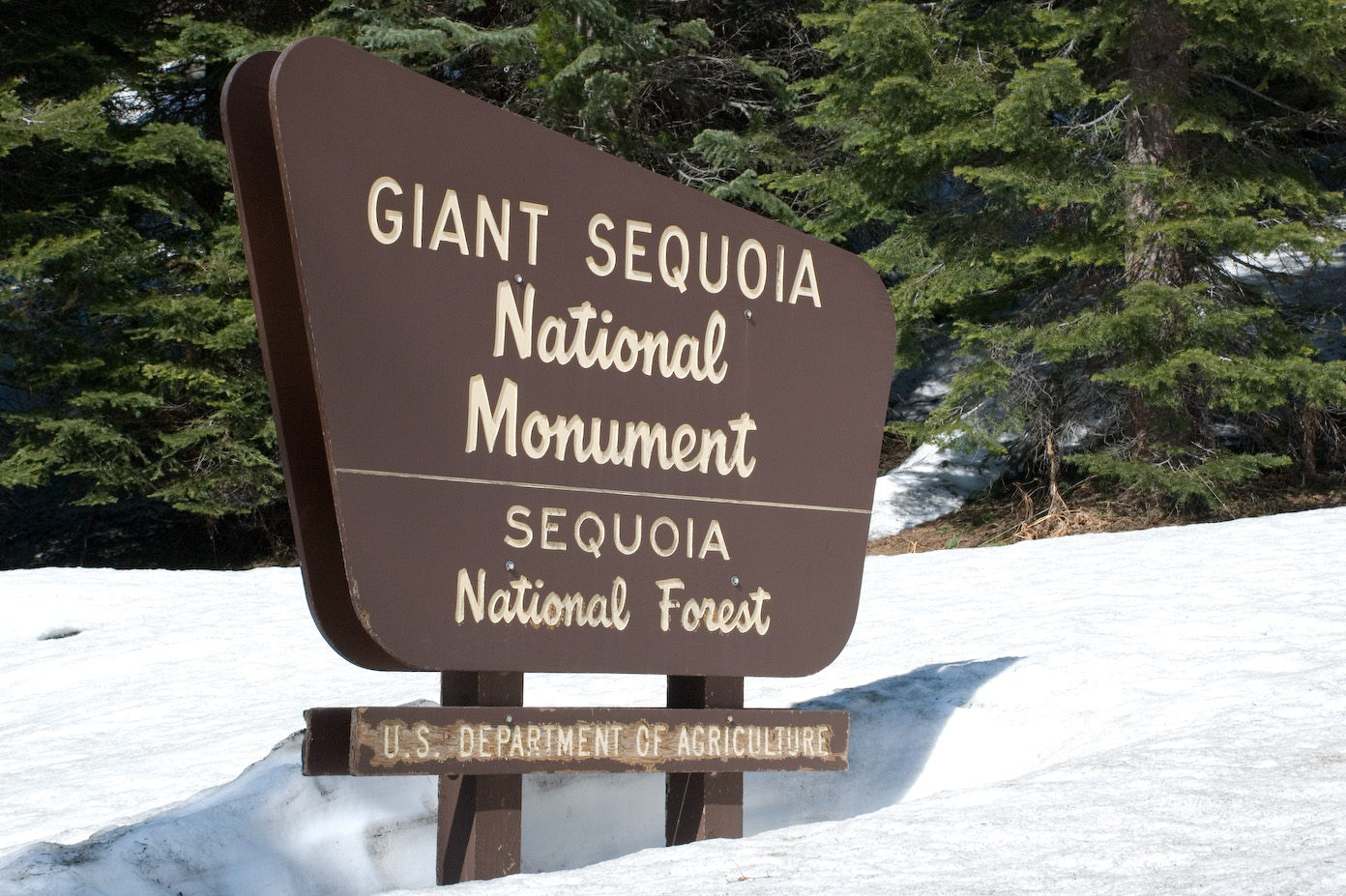
Entrance sign to Giant Sequoia National Monument.

Presidential Proclamation 7295 required that a management plan be completed within three years. In January 2004, the Sequoia National Forest published and began implementation of the Giant Sequoia National Monument Management Plan, which provided for use by an international public as well as for the protection and restoration of 33 giant sequoia groves and their ecosystems. Subsequently, two lawsuits were brought challenging the plan. In October 2006, Federal District Court Judge Charles Breyer found in favor of the plaintiffs and remanded the plan to the U.S. Forest Service "…so that a proper Monument Plan can be developed in accordance with the Presidential Proclamation,… and in compliance with the National Environmental Policy Act (NEPA)…"

In January 2008, the Sequoia National Forest published a notice of intent in the Federal Register that they intended to prepare an environmental impact statement and were beginning a year-long collaborative scoping process for development of a new Giant Sequoia National Monument Management Plan.

As of August 2010 only one location in the monument, the Generals Highway, is listed on the National Register of Historic Places, but the monument does have several hundred sites that are potentially eligible for the register.

== See also ==
- Converse Basin Grove
- Ecology of the Sierra Nevada
- List of giant sequoia groves
- List of largest giant sequoias
- List of plants of the Sierra Nevada (U.S.)
- List of national monuments of the United States
- Protected areas of the Sierra Nevada
- Fauna of the Sierra Nevada
- Flora of the Sierra Nevada
