= Floyd Otter Tree =

Giant sequoia in California, United States

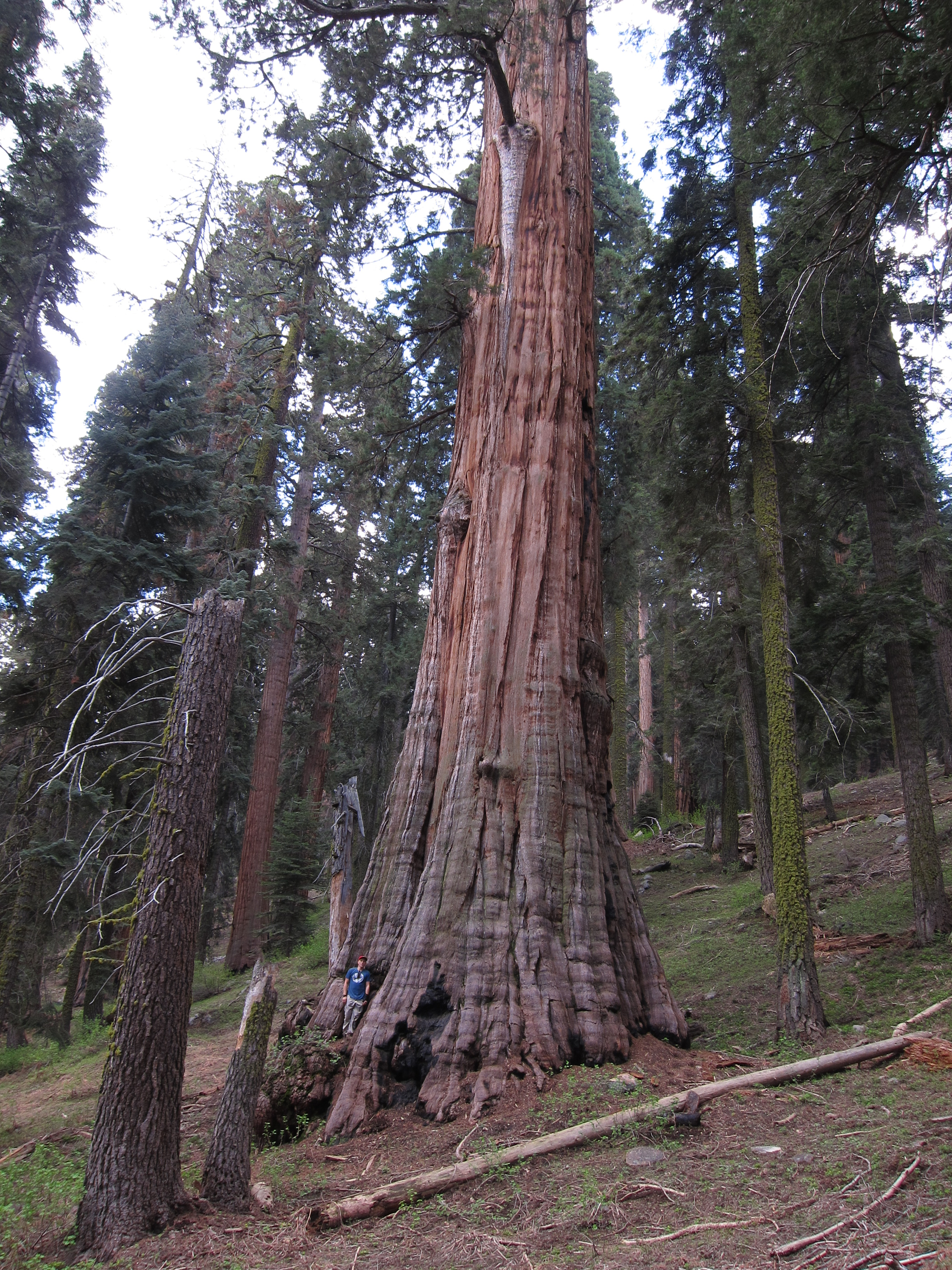
Floyd Otter Tree

The Floyd Otter Tree is a giant sequoia located in Garfield Grove, which is itself located near the town of Three Rivers, California. The tree was named after former Mountain Home Demonstration State Forest manager Floyd L. Otter. The tree is the twelfth largest giant sequoia in the world. It was severely burned in the Castle Fire in 2020 and may be moribund.

== History ==
In fall 1978, Naturalists Gus Boik, Wendell D. Flint, and Robert Walker discovered the two large giant sequoia trees (Eric De Groot Tree and Floyd Otter Tree) just upslope from the King Arthur Tree. However, the group did not have time to name or measure the two trees after measuring King Arthur. In 1993, Flint again mentioned the existence of an unnamed, roughly 25-foot (7.62 meter) diameter giant sequoia just upslope from the King Arthur Tree that he wasn't able to formally measure or name.

In 2001, naturalists James Chelebda, Arthur P. Cowley, Lawrence L. Otter (son of Floyd L. Otter), and Michael Reed were able to locate, measure, and name the Floyd Otter Tree while surveying Garfield Grove for the National Park Service. Their measurements were later published in December 2012, along with a definitive list of the 30 largest known giant sequoias and their respective measurements.

== Dimensions ==
Height above base	273.1 ft	83.2 m
Circumference at ground	99.5 ft	30.3 m
Estimated bole volume	39,562 cu ft	1,120 m^{3}

== See also ==
- List of largest giant sequoias
- List of individual trees
