= Black Mountain Grove (Southern California) =

Giant sequoia grove in Riverside County, California, United States

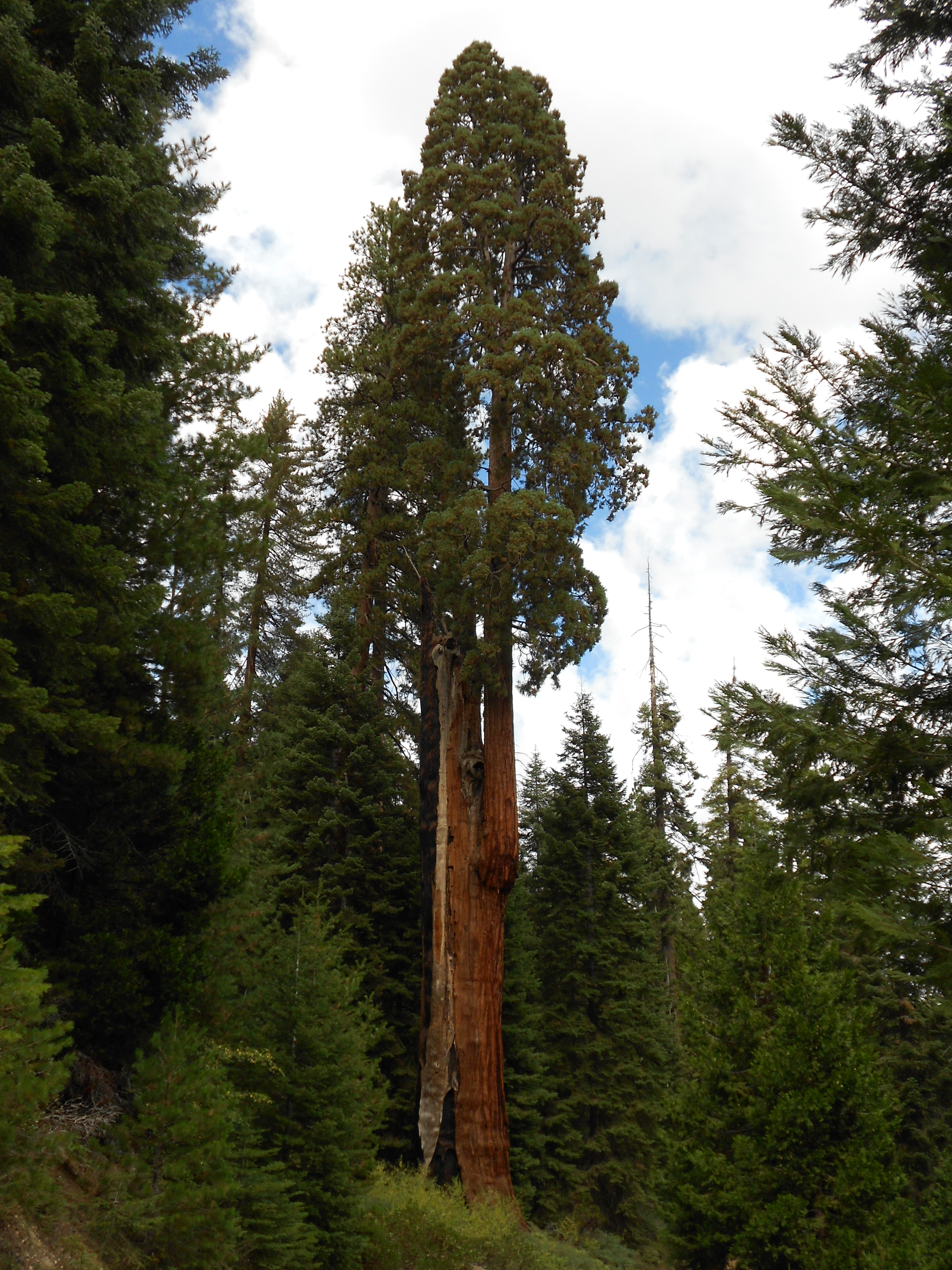

- Location within California

Geography
- Location: Riverside County, California, United States
- Coordinates: 33°49′33″N 116°45′58″W
- Elevation: 6,680–7,336 ft (2,036–2,236 m)

Administration
- Established: 1974

Ecology
- Dominant tree species: Sequoiadendron giganteum (giant sequoia)
- Lesser flora: Incense cedar, Jeffery pine

Black Mountain Grove is a giant sequoia grove containing more than 150 relatively young trees located in a ravine on the southwestern slope of Black Mountain, a minor peak of the San Jacinto Mountains in Riverside County, California.

== History ==
In late 1974, a small cluster of giant sequoia saplings were planted by the United States Forest Service in the San Jacinto Mountains of Southern California in the immediate aftermath of the Soboba Fire that left the landscape barren. The giant sequoias were rediscovered in 2008 by botanist Rudolf Schmid and his daughter Mena Schmidt while hiking on Black Mountain Trail through Hall Canyon. Black Mountain Grove is home to over 150 giant sequoias, some of which stand over 20 m (66 ft) tall.

It was later discovered that the US Forest Service had planted giant sequoias across Southern California. However, the giant sequoias of Black Mountain Grove and nearby Lake Fulmor Grove are the only ones known to be reproducing and propagating free of human intervention.

== Ecology ==
The environmental conditions of the San Jacinto Mountains mimic those of the Sierra Nevada, allowing the trees of Black Mountain Grove to naturally propagate throughout the canyon.

Black Mountain Grove is dominated by young giant sequoias and Jeffery pine, largely supplanting the native white fir-sugar pine forest present at higher elevations prior to the Soboba Fire. By contrast, the incense cedar forest present at lower elevations has since rebounded and now co-exists with the giant sequoias at the southern end of the grove.

== Access ==
Visiting Black Mountain Grove requires either a strenuous 2.5 mi (4.0 km) hike up Black Mountain Trail from a marked trailhead just off State Route 243, or a shorter but equally strenuous hike down from Boulder Basin Campground near the summit of Black Mountain.

== See also ==
- List of giant sequoia groves
- List of largest giant sequoias
