= Lake Fulmor =

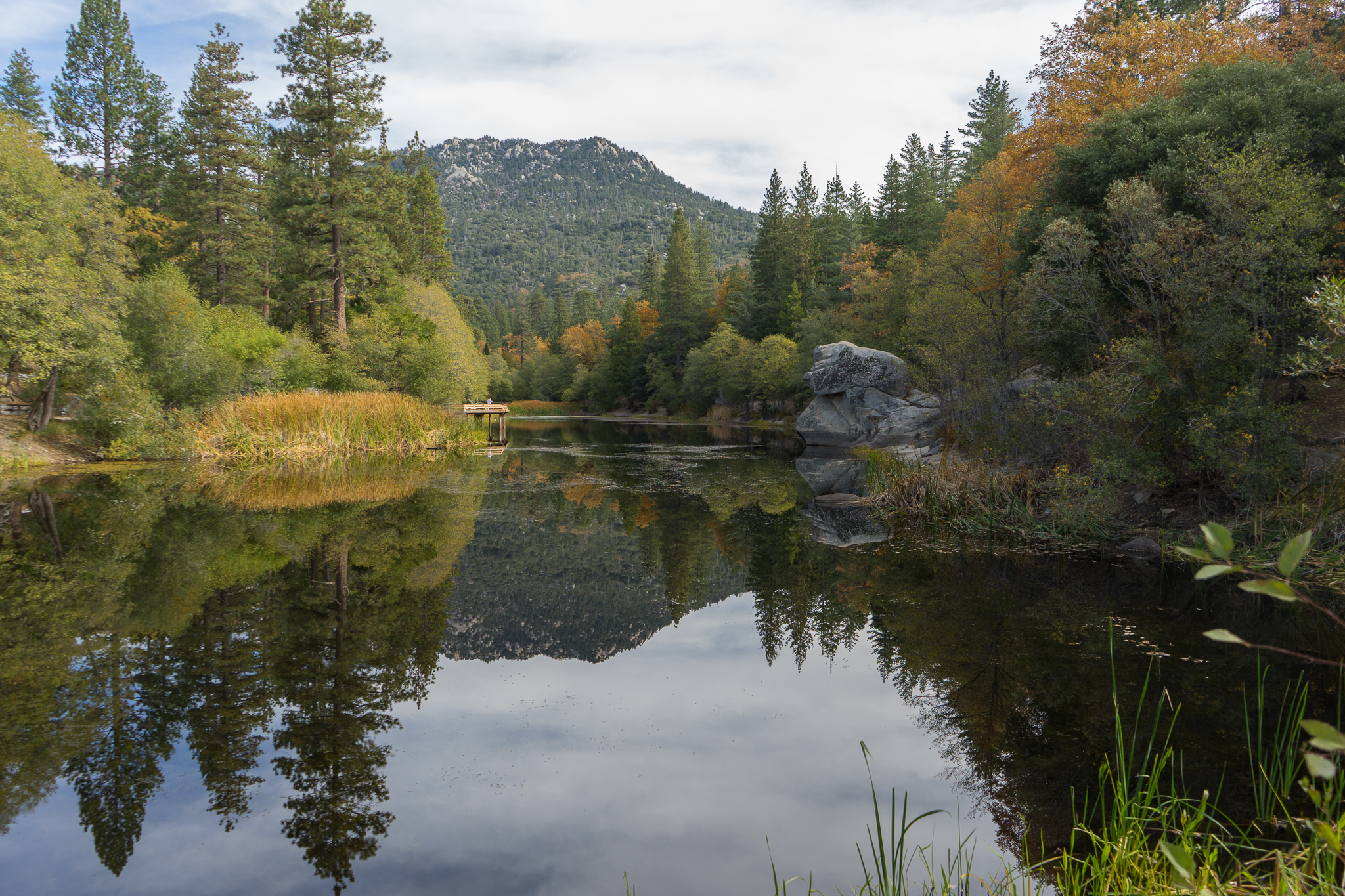
- Lake Fulmor

- Location of Lake Fulmor in California
- Location: Riverside County, California
- Coordinates: 33°48′18″N 116°46′47″W
- Type: Reservoir
- River sources: Indian Creek
- Primary outflows: Indian Creek
- Built: 1947
- First flooded: 1948
- Max. length: 960 ft (290 m)
- Max. width: 60 ft (18 m)
- Surface elevation: 5,300 ft (1,600 m)
- Settlements: Pine Cove

Lake Fulmor is a small artificial lake formed by an earthen dam on Indian Creek in the San Jacinto Mountains of Riverside County, California. The lake is located just off State Route 243, about 7 mi (11 km) northwest of the unincorporated community of Pine Cove.

== History ==
Lake Fulmor was formed in 1947 and filled in 1948 by the US Forest Service. The lake was named after A. C. Fulmor in 1949. The dam which impounds Indian Creek allows for the passage of State Route 243 through the area. A small day-use picnic area was built sometime between 1953 and 1954.

In 1980, the US Forest Service planted a giant sequoia sapling in the picnic area on the northern shore of Lake Fulmor. The tree has since propagated into an entire grove of giant sequoias collectively referred to as Lake Fulmor Grove. It is one of only two artificial giant sequoia groves known to be propagating free of human intervention, the other being Black Mountain Grove located at the head of Indian Creek.

== Ecology ==
=== Flora ===
The lake is surrounded by an incense cedar-Douglas fir forest and hosts an artificial grove of seven giant sequoias along its northern shores, the largest of which stands 67 ft (20 m) tall. The environmental conditions of the San Jacinto Mountains mimic those of the Sierra Nevada, allowing the giant sequoia trees of Lake Fulmor Grove to naturally propagate.

=== Fauna ===
The lake and its surroundings are home to a wide variety of native wildlife, including mule deer, ground squirrel, Steller's Jay, and the California tree frog. The US Forest Service regularly plants rainbow trout within the lake for the purposes of recreational fishing.

== Activities ==
The lake is a popular stop-over for travelers along the Banning-Idyllwild Panoramic Highway. The day use area located there features a picnic area, pit toilets, small fishing pier, and a rock-lined dirt trail system that encircles the lake.

== See also ==
- Lake Hemet
- James Reserve - located immediately northeast of Lake Fulmor
