= James Reserve =

Unit of the University of California Natural Reserve System

James San Jacinto Mountains Reserve
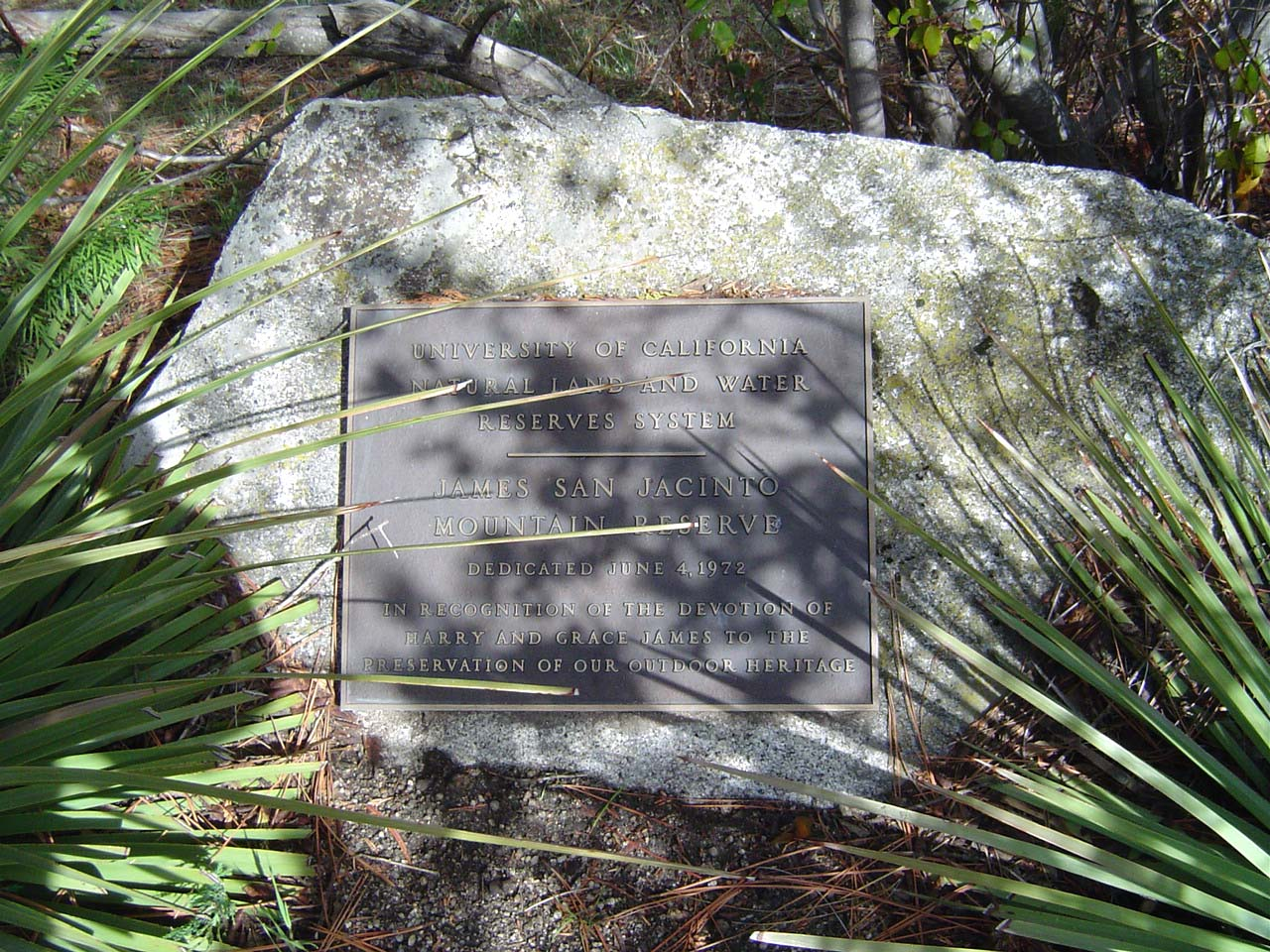
- The founders' rock in James Reserve

- Location within southern California
- Location: Riverside County, California, United States
- Nearest town: Idyllwild
- Coordinates: 33°48′30″N 116°46′40″W
- Area: 29 acres (12 ha)
- Established: 1966
- Owner: University of California, Riverside
- Administrator: University of California Natural Reserve System
- Website: james.ucnrs.org

The James San Jacinto Mountains Reserve, a unit of the University of California Natural Reserve System, is a 29-acre (120,000 m^{2}) ecological reserve and biological field station located at an altitude of 5,200 feet (1,600 m) in a wilderness area of the San Jacinto Mountains near Lake Fulmor in Riverside County, California, United States.

== Overview ==
The James Reserve property was purchased in 1966 by the University of California, Riverside, from Harry and Grace James.

In addition to acting as a protected natural area for teaching and research in the sciences, it is also available as an engineering testing ground for various sensor-related and ecosystem monitoring technologies.

The primary research focus at the James Reserve has been ecological monitoring using ecological sensing systems. Over the internet, researchers, students and the interested public may unobtrusively visit and view nature via a webcam observatory, which includes an interactive robotic camera. Devices in the outdoor laboratory allow non-intrusive, around-the-clock monitoring.

The Director of the Reserve is Dr. Casey Woodall.

== Access ==
Overnight accommodations for researchers and school groups may be made for the on-site Trailfinders Lodge. Visitation is by permission only.

== See also ==
- San Bernardino National Forest
- Santa Rosa and San Jacinto Mountains National Monument
- Santa Rosa Wilderness
- Mojave and Colorado Deserts Biosphere Reserve
