= Stagg Tree =

Giant sequoia in Alder Creek Grove, California, USA

Coordinates: 36°11′29″N 118°37′08″W

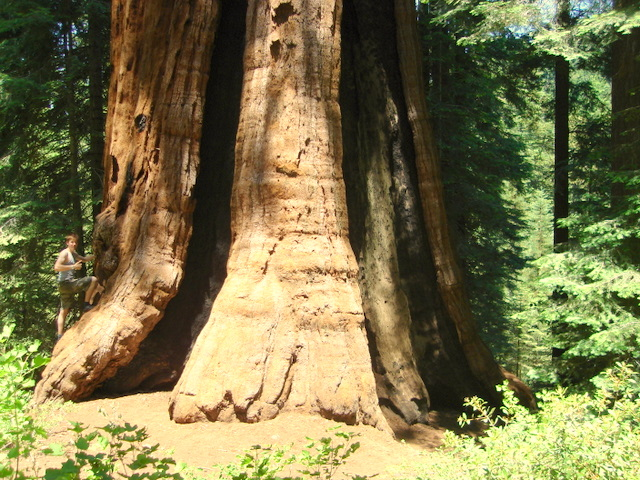
The Stagg Tree – the fifth largest tree in the world

The Stagg Tree, officially the Amos Alonzo Stagg Tree and formerly known as the Day Tree, is a giant sequoia in Alder Creek Grove in California's Sierra Nevada mountains. It is the fifth largest tree in the world and the tallest giant sequoia south of the Lincoln Tree in Sequoia National Park. The tree features the second largest footprint of any living giant sequoia, measuring 109 ft (33 m) in circumference at ground level, and second only to the Boole Tree. The tree is believed to be over 3,000 years old, making it one of the oldest living giant sequoias.

The Stagg tree has sat upon the private land of the Rouch family, making it the largest privately owned tree in the world. However, it remains freely accessible to the public.

== History ==
The tree was renamed in 1960 after Amos Alonzo Stagg (1862–1965), a pioneering football coach at the University of Chicago who spent much of the last several decades of his life coaching in Stockton in the nearby San Joaquin Valley.

In 1993, a group of climbers scaled the full height of the tree and discovered a hollow room inside its trunk near the very top.

On September 17, 2019, the Save the Redwoods League announced it had agreed to pay the Rouch family $15.6 million by December 31 to formally protect Stagg and the surrounding grove. Once the deal is finalized, the League plans to spend another $4.75 million on ecosystem studies and restoration work before handing the grove over to the U.S. Forest Service to be incorporated into Giant Sequoia National Monument. It will then become the largest giant sequoia on land managed by the U.S. Forest Service, edging out the Boole Tree of Converse Basin Grove, the current largest on forest service land.

The Stagg tree was saved from the Castle Fire in 2020 by a sprinkler system set by firefighters.

== Dimensions ==
L. Day noticed the tree in 1931 and, with help from two others, made measurements of it in 1932. Wendell Flint measured it in 1977 as follows:

	Metres	Feet
Height above base	74.1	243.0
Circumference at ground	33.3	109.0
Diameter 1.5 m above base	7.05	22.9
Diameter 18 m (60') above base	5.6	18.2
Diameter 55 m (180') above base	3.8	12.5
Estimated bole volume (m^{3}.ft^{3})	1,205.0	42,557.0

== See also ==
- List of largest giant sequoias
- List of individual trees
- List of oldest trees
