= Alder Creek Grove =

Giant sequoia grove in Tulare County, California, United States

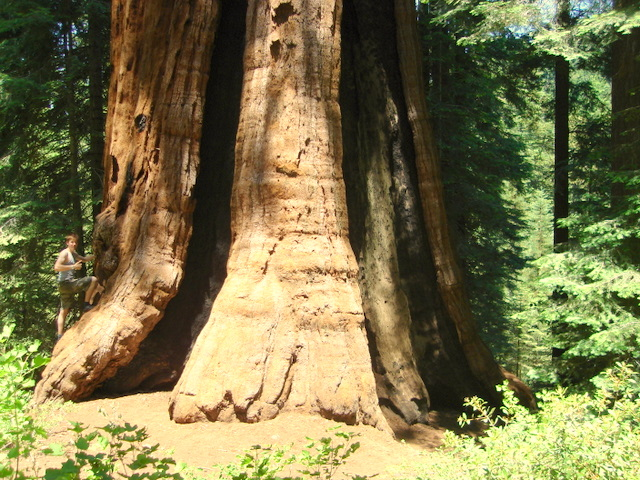
- The Stagg Tree, fifth largest tree in the world by board feet

- Location within California

Geography
- Location: Tulare County, California, United States
- Coordinates: 36°11′08″N 118°37′41″W
- Elevation: 6,960 ft (2,120 m)
- Area: 785 acres (318 ha)

Ecology
- Dominant tree species: Sequoiadendron giganteum

Alder Creek Grove is a giant sequoia grove located both on private land and within the Giant Sequoia National Monument in the western Sierra Nevada of California. The grove is spread out over approximately 785 acres (318 ha) of land and contains 526 giant sequoias that are at least 6 feet in diameter, including the Stagg Tree, the 5th largest tree in the world and one of the oldest known living giant sequoias. It is estimated that approximately 200 mature giant sequoias died in the grove from the 2020 Castle Fire, part of the SQF Lightning Complex.

== History ==
In 1946, much of Alder Creek Grove was purchased by the Rouch family to be logged and developed. The grove was logged in the late 1940s and early 1950s. However, doing so proved to be uneconomical due to the brittle nature of giant sequoia wood, and the regret the family felt logging them. About two dozen giant sequoias were cut down.

A 236-lot subdivision of mostly summer cabins, called Sequoia Crest, was built in and adjacent to the grove around the same time so people could visit the Stagg Tree and some of the surrounding giant sequoias. A short-lived ski resort was also established to make the land more profitable for the Rouch family.

On September 17, 2019, the Save the Redwoods League announced it was raising $15.65 million to buy 530 acres from the Rouch family to formally protect the giant sequoias found there, including the Stagg Tree. The nonprofit group was able to acquire the property—the largest private holding of unprotected sequoias at the time—raising funds from more than 8,500 donors worldwide, including from every U.S. state and 30 other countries.

After acquiring the parcel, Save the Redwoods League planned to retain and steward the Alder Creek property for 5–10 years before handing it over to the U.S. Forest Service. The property will be incorporated into Giant Sequoia National Monument so the property could be cooperatively stewarded with the portion of the grove already managed by the U.S. Forest Service. The Stagg Tree will then become the largest giant sequoia on land managed by the U.S. Forest Service, edging out the Boole Tree of Converse Basin Grove, the current largest on forest service land.

== Castle Fire ==
On September 13, 2020, the high-intensity Castle Fire, part of the SQF Lightning Complex, swept through the Alder Creek Grove. An assessment of the wildfire in 2021 showed that 200 mature sequoias were killed and another 49 were severely damaged in the Alder Creek Grove, which is approximately 47% of the giant sequoias over 6 feet (1.8 m) in diameter in this grove. The Stagg Tree survived in part because firefighters ran hoses and turned on sprinklers at its base. The Sequoia Crest subdivision lost 46 of 102 homes.

In 2020, 19 sequoia groves burned in wildfires, and it is estimated that the SQF Complex caused the death of 10-14 percent of mature giant sequoias.

Range-wide giant sequoia grove research and restoration has progressed, largely led by the Giant Sequoia Lands Coalition, a multi-partner collaboration dedicated to the conservation and stewardship of giant sequoia grove ecosystems. The U.S. Forest Service and Save the Redwoods League, both coalition members, are actively leading restoration programs in the Alder Creek Grove and in other parts of the sequoia range. They have been conducting post-fire restoration in the Alder Creek Grove since 2021 to remove some standing dead trees and combustible, overgrown vegetation to reduce the risk and severity of future wildfires. In 2023, they planted more than 30,000 giant sequoia seedlings and 20,000 other native trees in areas where mature seed trees died and natural regeneration has been low. In 2024, two cultural burns were held at Alder Creek to improve forest health and revive Indigenous land management practices in the grove. Leaders from the Tübatulabal, North Fork Mono, and Tule River Indian Tribe of California led the cultural burn demonstrations.

== Description ==
Alder Creek Grove is remarkably diverse, being made up of trees of many different ages and sizes, from seedlings to 3,000-year-old giants. There are also mature stands of red fir, white fir, ponderosa pine, and sugar pine trees mixed in amongst the giant sequoias. The grove is also home to several meadows, wetlands, and lush riparian woodlands.

== Noteworthy trees ==
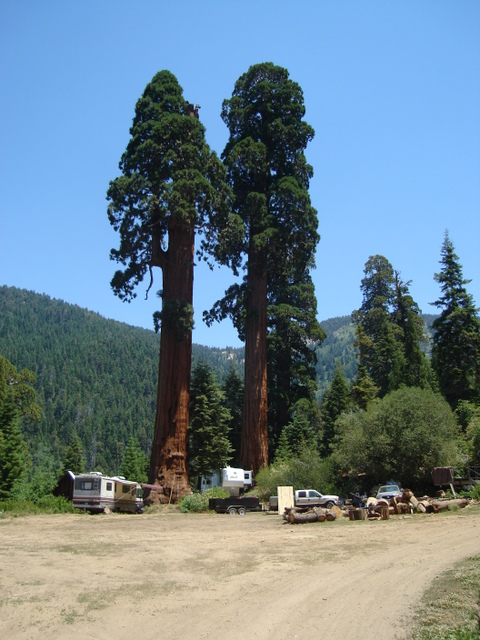
Trailer in Alder Creek Grove close to two giant sequoias

- Stagg: the fifth largest giant sequoia in the world with a volume of 42,557 cubic feet (1,205.1 m^{3}). The tree was discovered in 1960 and named after Amos Alonzo Stagg, an American athlete and college coach in multiple sports. The tree is located on private property, but anyone is allowed to visit the tree if they park where signed and walk the 0.33 mi (0.53 km) trail to the tree.
- Waterfall: was a giant sequoia with the largest ground perimeter of any living giant sequoia, measuring 140.1 ft (42.7 m). The immense basal buttress of the tree supported it as it grows along the steep southern bank of South Alder Creek. It tapered dramatically from the ground up, and had a height of approximately 225 ft (69 m). It was destroyed in the Castle Fire of 2020. Several seeds had previously been collected from Waterfall and have since been replanted in the same area.
- Window: a giant sequoia which featured a large "window" that was formed when the tree was weakened by disease and later struck by lightning. This tree was also destroyed by the Castle Fire.

== See also ==
- List of giant sequoia groves
