= Garfield Grove =

Giant sequoia grove in Tulare County, California, United States

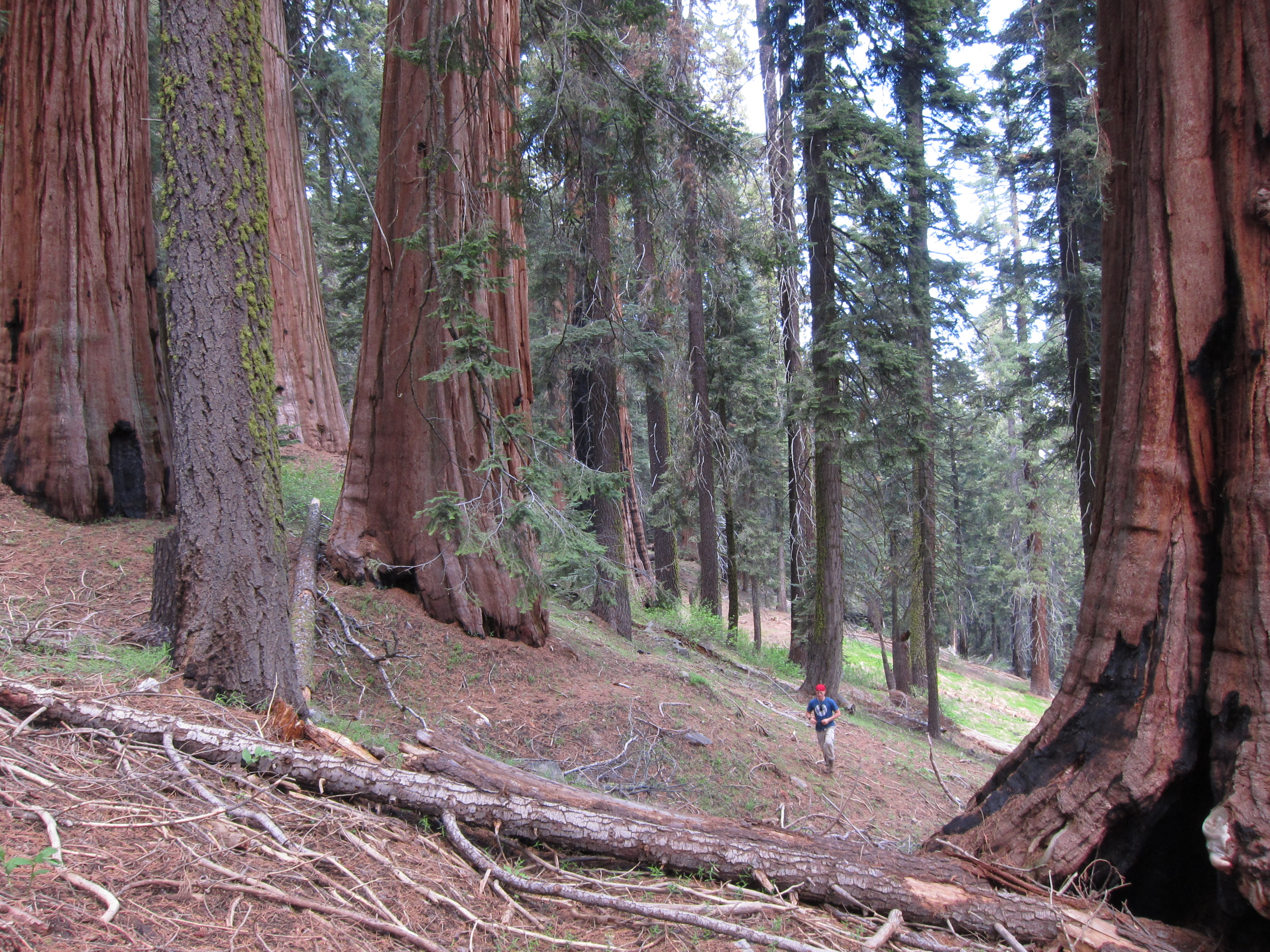
- Garfield Grove

- Location within California
- Interactive map of Garfield Grove

Geography
- Location: Tulare County, California, United States
- Coordinates: 36°20′00″N 118°43′06″W
- Elevation: 6,660 ft (2,030 m)
- Area: 2,902 acres (11.74 km^{2})

Ecology
- Dominant tree species: Sequoiadendron giganteum

Garfield Grove is a Giant Sequoia grove. The entire 2,902 acres (11.74 km^{2}) lies in Sequoia National Park in the Sierra Nevada range in eastern California in the United States.

In December 2001, the neighboring Dillonwood Grove was purchased by the Save The Redwoods League for $10.3 million and added to Sequoia National Park. Prior to the purchase, the Dillonwood Grove was the largest grove in private ownership. The two groves are botanically the same and now managed as a single grove.

== Noteworthy trees ==
Some of the trees found in the grove that are worthy of special note are:

- Floyd Otter (tree): This tree was measured in 2001–2002 and found to be the 12th largest tree in the world.
- King Arthur (tree): This tree was first discovered in 1949, but only seen from far away, the hiker had told a ranger that he saw a huge tree. In 1978, Wendell Flint, Bob Walker and Gus Boik found the tree and named it King Arthur. This tree is the tenth largest giant sequoia. Its base, up to about 50 feet (15 m), rivals the General Sherman for total mass.

== See also ==
- List of giant sequoia groves
- List of largest giant sequoias
