= King Arthur Tree =

Giant sequoia in Garfield Grove, California

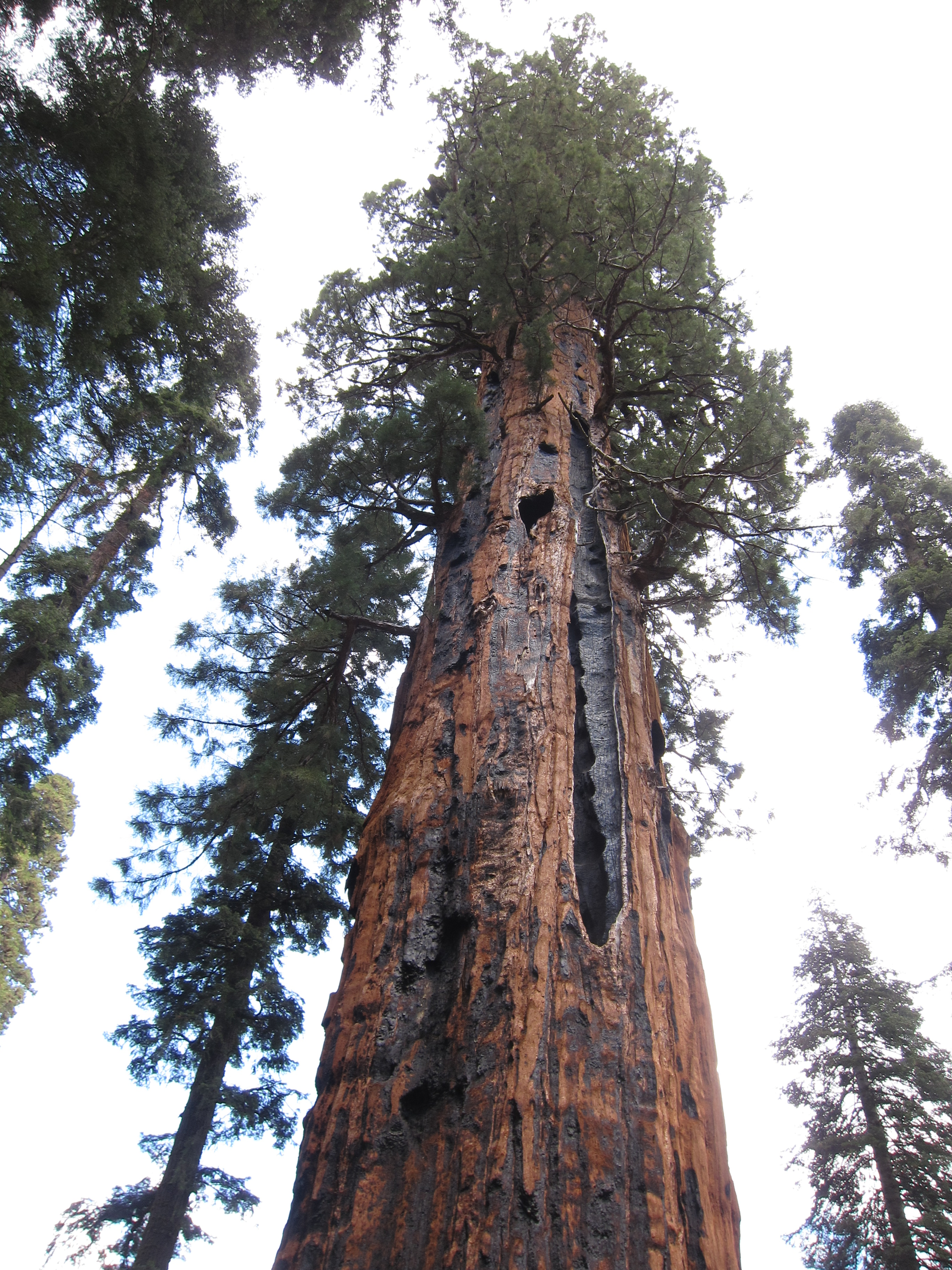
King Arthur Tree

The King Arthur Tree, formerly known as the California Tree, was a giant sequoia located in Garfield Grove, near the town of Three Rivers in California. Its base of up to about 50 feet (15 m) rivaled the General Sherman, the largest giant sequoia, for total mass. It died in the Castle Fire of 2020.

The tree was once known as the California Tree, as shown in National Park Service promotional literature from 1917. The King Arthur was the ninth largest giant sequoia in the world.

== Dimensions ==
As of 2012, before the Castle Fire, the dimensions of the King Arthur Tree were:

Height above base	270.3 ft	82.4 m
Circumference at ground	104.2 ft	31.8 m
Estimated bole volume	40,656 ft^{3}	1,151 m^{3}

== See also ==
- List of largest giant sequoias
- List of individual trees
