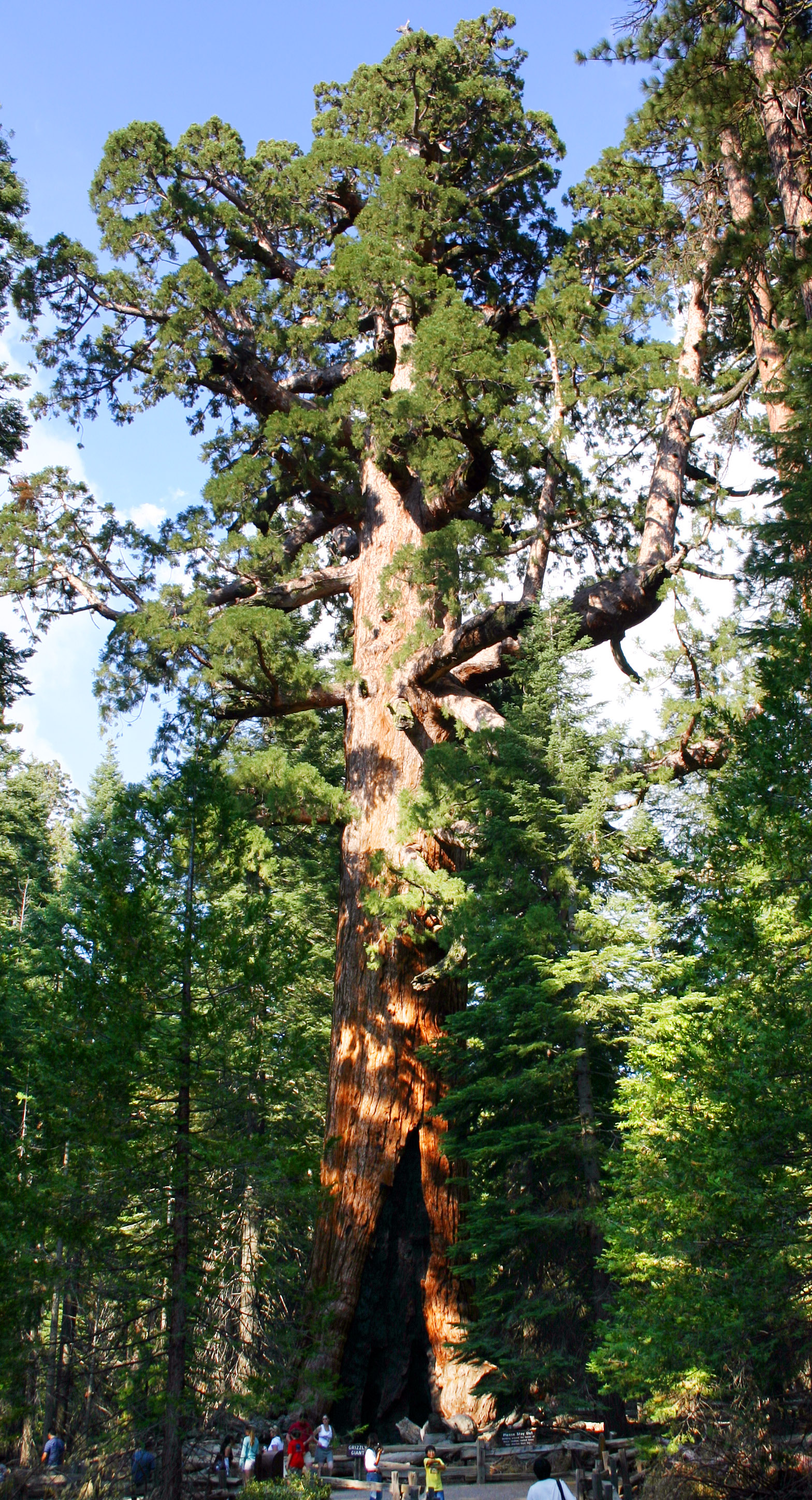
- The "Grizzly Giant" in the Mariposa Grove, Yosemite National Park

Conservation status
- Endangered (IUCN 3.1)

- Vulnerable (NatureServe)

Scientific classification
- Kingdom: Plantae
- Clade: Tracheophytes
- Clade: Gymnosperms
- Division: Pinophyta
- Class: Pinopsida
- Order: Cupressales
- Family: Cupressaceae
- Genus: Sequoiadendron
- Species: S. giganteum

Binomial name
- Sequoiadendron giganteum (Lindl.) J.Buchh., 1939
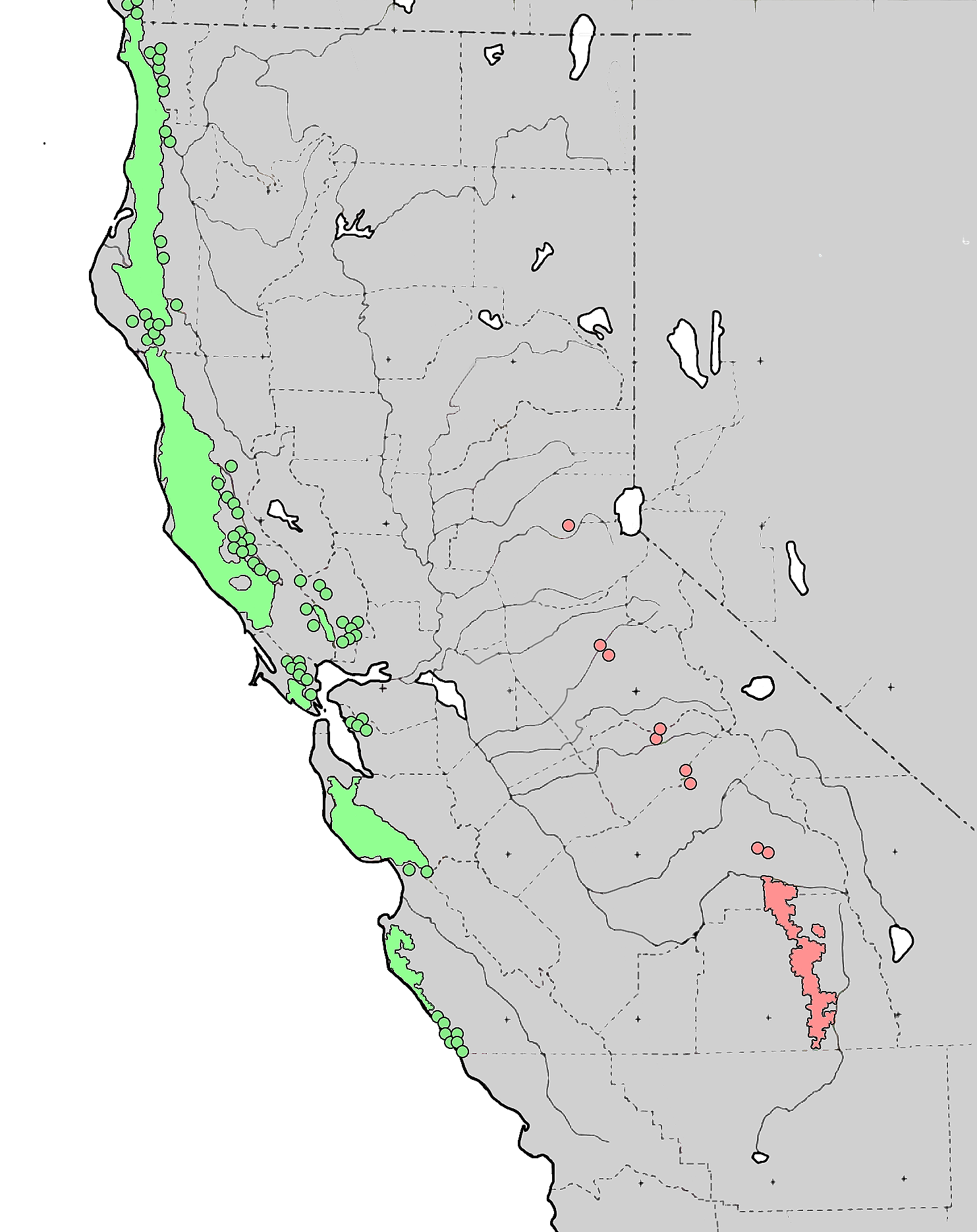
- Natural range of the California members of the subfamily Sequoioideae red – Sequoiadendron giganteum green – Sequoia sempervirens

= Sequoiadendron giganteum =

Species of tree native to North America

Sequoiadendron giganteum (also known as the giant sequoia, giant redwood, Sierra redwood or Wellingtonia) is a species of coniferous tree, classified in the family Cupressaceae in the subfamily Sequoioideae. Giant sequoia specimens are the largest trees on Earth. They are native to the groves on the western slopes of the Sierra Nevada mountain range of California but have been introduced, planted, and grown around the world.

The giant sequoia is listed as an endangered species by the IUCN with fewer than 80,000 remaining in its native California.

The giant sequoia grow to an average height of 50–85 m (164–279 ft) with trunk diameters ranging from 6–8 m (20–26 ft). Record trees have been measured at 94.8 m (311 ft) tall. The specimen known to have the greatest diameter at breast height is the General Grant tree at 8.8 m (29 ft). Giant sequoias are among the oldest living organisms on Earth. The oldest known giant sequoia is 3,200–3,266 years old.

Wood from mature giant sequoias is fibrous and brittle; trees would often shatter after they were felled. The wood is unsuitable for construction and instead is used for fence posts or match sticks. The giant sequoia is a very popular ornamental tree in many parts of the world.

== Evolutionary history and taxonomy ==
A close relative to the giganteum is the Sequoia sempervirens, which lives in an area on the coast of the Pacific Coast of North America. The earliest relatives of the giganteum existed in the Cretaceous Period. The oldest fossil in the Sequoiadendron genus is from the Miocene Epoch. These existed roughly 10-20 million years ago and are likely the direct ancestor of the giganteum. The fossil belongs to a tree from the Sequoiadendron chaneyi.

About 5-10 million years ago, during the late miocene epoch, ancestors of the giganteum existed in western Nevada, but moved west as the climate became cooler and drier. This eventually led to the settling of the Sequoiadendron in the Sierra Nevada.

Today, there are only 3 living species in the subfamily Sequoioideae. Each of them are in their own genus. The first two are the Sequoiadendron giganteum and the Metasequoia glyptostroboides. The last is the Sequoia sempervirens. There has been research to show that S. sempervirens may have come into fruition as an ancient hybrid between ancestors of the giant sequoia and Metasequoia.

Within the Sequoiadendron genus, there are only 3 species, one of which, have survived to today (giganteum). One of the other species is tchucoticum. Its shoots are closest to the giganteum. They existed during the Late Cretaceous period. The tchucoticum existed in the Enmyvaam River Basin in Russia. The other species is chaneyi. This existed until the late Miocene, mostly in western Nevada.

== Etymology ==
The etymology of the genus name was long presumed, initially in The Yosemite Book by Josiah Whitney in 1868, to be in honor of Sequoyah (1767–1843), who was the inventor of the Cherokee syllabary. An etymological study published in 2012 debunked that "American myth", concluding that Austrian Stephen L. Endlicher derived the name from the Latin word sequi (meaning to follow), because the number of seeds per cone in the newly classified genus aligned in mathematical sequence with the other four genera in the suborder.

== Description ==
Giant sequoia specimens are the most massive individual trees in the world. They grow to an average height of 50–85 m (164–279 ft) with trunk diameters ranging from 6–8 m (20–26 ft). Record trees have been measured at 94.8 m (311 ft) tall. Trunk diameters of 17 m (56 ft) have been claimed via research figures taken out of context. The specimen known to have the greatest diameter at breast height is the General Grant Tree at 8.8 m (28.9 ft). Between 2014 and 2016, it is claimed that specimens of coast redwood were found to have greater trunk diameters than all known giant sequoias – though this has not been independently verified or affirmed in any academic literature. The trunks of coast redwoods taper at lower heights than those of giant sequoias which have more columnar trunks that maintain larger diameters to greater heights.

The oldest known giant sequoia is 3,200–3,266 years old based on dendrochronology. That tree has been verified to have the fourth-largest lifespan of any tree, after individuals of Great Basin bristlecone pine and alerce. Giant sequoia bark is fibrous, furrowed, and may be 90 cm (3 ft) thick at the base of the columnar trunk. The sap contains tannic acid, which provides significant protection from fire damage. The leaves are evergreen, awl-shaped, 3–6 mm (1/8–1/4 in) long, and arranged spirally on the shoots.

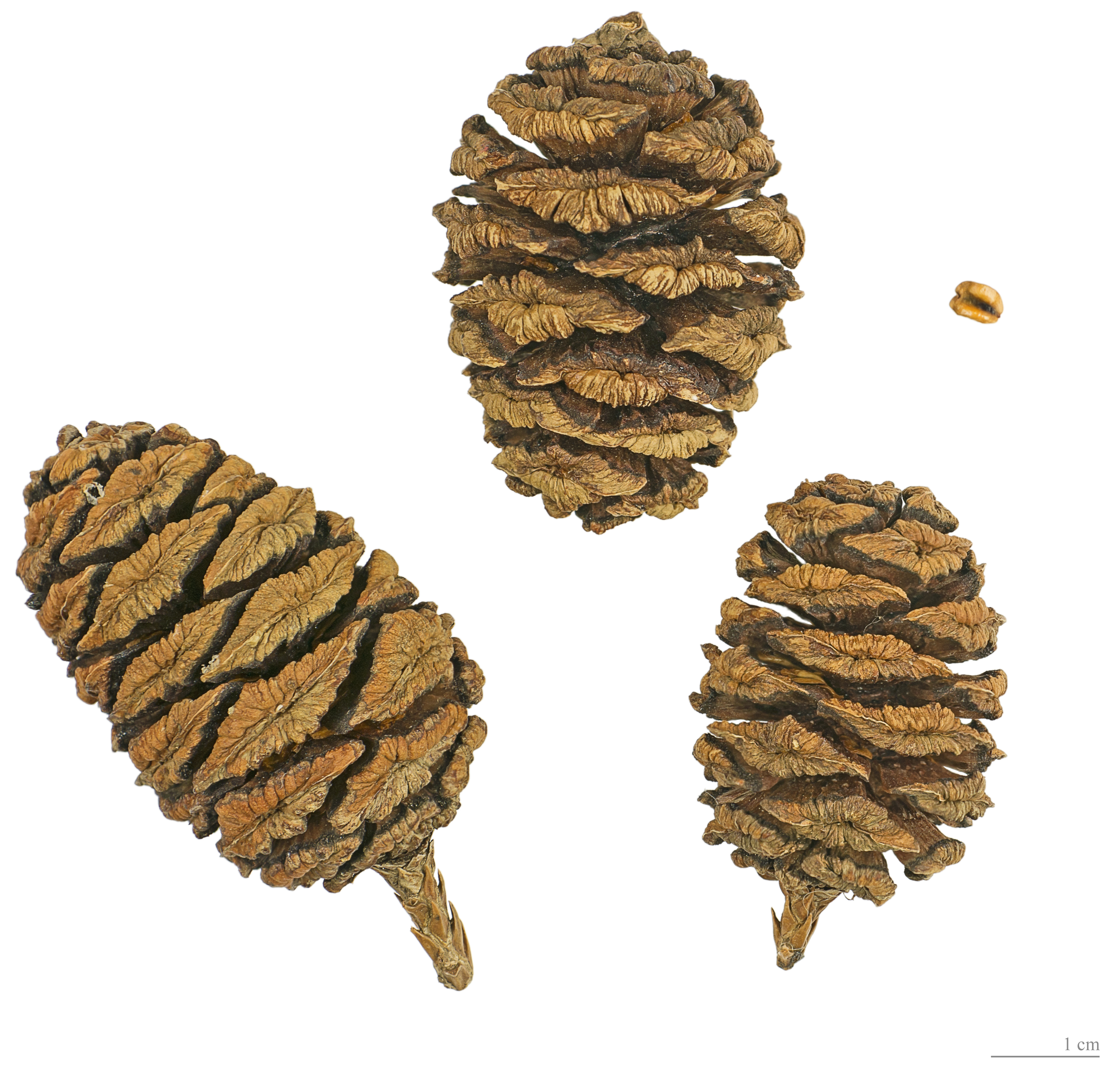
Mature cones and seed

The wood is famously resistant to decay. A "nearly complete" S. giganteum log has been discovered 800 m (0.50 mi) south of the Nelder Grove which gave a radiocarbon-14 date of 10,000 years. Due to the longevity, fast growth, and large growth of this species, it also has high carbon storage potential for carbon sequestration.

The giant sequoia regenerates by seed. The seed cones are 4–7 cm (1 1/2–3 in) long and mature in 18–20 months, though they typically remain green and closed for as long as 20 years. Each cone has 30–50 spirally arranged scales, with several seeds on each scale, giving an average of 230 seeds per cone. Seeds are dark brown, 4–5 mm (0.16–0.20 in) long, and 1 mm (0.04 in) broad, with a 1-millimeter (0.04 in) wide, yellow-brown wing along each side. Some seeds shed when the cone scales shrink during hot weather in late summer, but most are liberated by insect damage or when the cone dries from the heat of fire. The trees do not begin to bear cones until they are 12 years old.

Trees may produce sprouts from their stumps subsequent to injury, until about 20 years old; however, shoots do not form on the stumps of more mature trees as they do on coast redwoods. Giant sequoias of all ages may sprout from their boles when branches are lost to fire or breakage.

A large tree may have as many as 11,000 cones. Cone production is greatest in the upper portion of the canopy. A mature giant sequoia disperses an estimated 300,000–400,000 seeds annually. The winged seeds may fly as far as 180 m (590 ft) from the parent tree.

Lower branches die readily from being shaded, but trees younger than 100 years retain most of their dead branches. Trunks of mature trees in groves are generally free of branches to a height of 20–50 m (70–160 ft), but solitary trees retain lower branches.

== Distribution ==
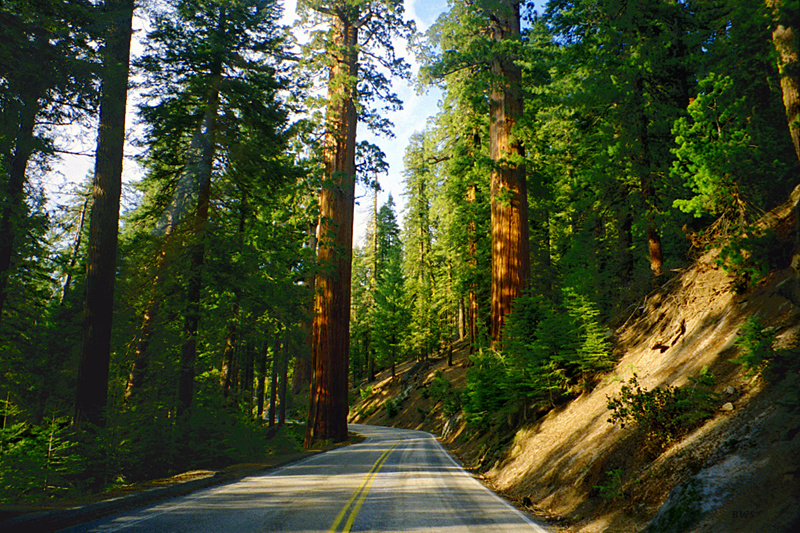
The Generals Highway passes between giant sequoias in Sequoia National Park

The natural distribution of giant sequoias is restricted to a limited area of the western Sierra Nevada, California. As a paleoendemic species, they occur in scattered groves, with a total of 81 groves (see list of sequoia groves for a full inventory), comprising a total area of only 144.16 km^{2} (35,620 acres). Nowhere does it grow in pure stands, although in a few small areas, stands do approach a pure condition. The northern two-thirds of its range, from the American River in Placer County southward to the Kings River, has only eight disjunct groves. The remaining southern groves are concentrated between the Kings River and the Deer Creek Grove in southern Tulare County. Groves range in size from 12.4 km^{2} (3,100 acres) with 20,000 mature trees, to small groves with only six living trees. Many are protected in Sequoia and Kings Canyon National Parks and Giant Sequoia National Monument.

The giant sequoia is usually found in a humid climate characterized by dry summers and snowy winters. Most giant sequoia groves are on granitic-based residual and alluvial soils. The elevation of the giant sequoia groves generally ranges from 1,400–2,000 m (4,600–6,600 ft) in the north, to 1,700–2,150 metres (5,580–7,050 ft) to the south. Giant sequoias generally occur on the south-facing sides of northern mountains, and on the northern faces of more southerly slopes.

High levels of reproduction are not necessary to maintain the present population levels. Few groves, however, have sufficient young trees to maintain the present density of mature giant sequoias for the future. The majority of giant sequoia groves are currently undergoing a gradual decline in density since European settlement.

=== Pre-historic range ===
While the present day distribution of this species is limited to a small area of California, it was once much more widely distributed in prehistoric times, and was a reasonably common species in North American and Eurasian coniferous forests until its range was greatly reduced by the last ice age. Older fossil specimens reliably identified as giant sequoia have been found in Cretaceous era sediments from a number of sites in North America and Europe, and even as far afield as New Zealand and Australia.

=== Artificial groves ===
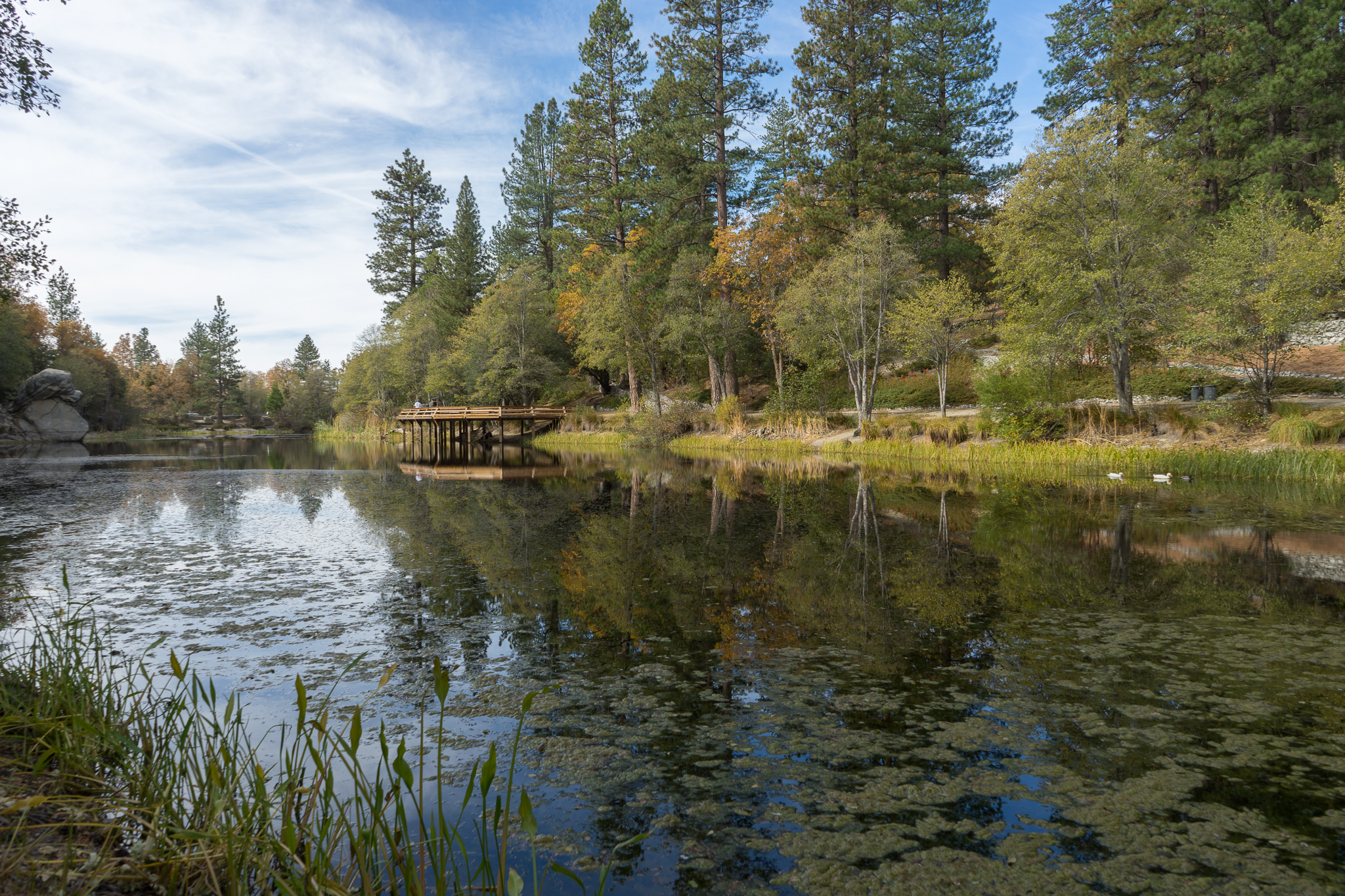
Lake Fulmor, featuring a small grove of giant sequoia trees (top center)

In 1974, a group of giant sequoias was planted by the United States Forest Service in the San Jacinto Mountains of Southern California in the immediate aftermath of a wildfire that left the landscape barren. The giant sequoias were rediscovered in 2008 by botanist Rudolf Schmidt and his daughter Mena Schmidt while hiking on Black Mountain Trail through Hall Canyon. Black Mountain Grove is home to over 150 giant sequoias, some of which stand over 6.1 m (20 ft) tall. This grove is not to be confused with the Black Mountain Grove in the southern Sierra. Nearby Lake Fulmor Grove is home to seven giant sequoias, the largest of which is 20 m (66 ft) tall. The two groves are located approximately 175 mi (282 km) southeast of the southernmost naturally occurring giant sequoia grove, Deer Creek Grove.

It was later discovered that the United States Forest Service had planted giant sequoias across Southern California. However, the giant sequoias of Black Mountain Grove and nearby Lake Fulmor Grove are the only ones known to be reproducing and propagating free of human intervention. The conditions of the San Jacinto Mountains mimic those of the Sierra Nevada, allowing the trees to naturally propagate throughout the canyon.

== Ecology ==
Two giant sequoias, Sequoia National Park. The right-hand tree bears a large fire scar at its base; fires do not typically kill the trees but do remove competing thin-barked species, and aid giant sequoia regeneration.

Giant sequoias are in many ways adapted to forest fires. Their bark is unusually fire resistant, and their cones will normally open immediately after a fire. Giant sequoias are a pioneer species, and are having difficulty reproducing in their original habitat (and very rarely reproduce in cultivation) due to the seeds only being able to grow successfully in full sun and in mineral-rich soils, free from competing vegetation. Although the seeds can germinate in moist needle humus in the spring, these seedlings will die as the duff dries in the summer. They therefore require periodic wildfire to clear competing vegetation and soil humus before successful regeneration can occur. Without fire, shade-loving species will crowd out young sequoia seedlings, and sequoia seeds will not germinate. These trees require large amounts of water and are often concentrated near streams. Their growth is dependent on soil moisture. Squirrels, chipmunks, finches and sparrows consume the freshly sprouted seedlings, preventing their growth.

Fires also bring hot air high into the canopy via convection, which in turn dries and opens the cones. The subsequent release of large quantities of seeds coincides with the optimal postfire seedbed conditions. Loose ground ash may also act as a cover to protect the fallen seeds from ultraviolet radiation damage. Due to fire suppression efforts and livestock grazing during the early and mid-20th century, low-intensity fires no longer occurred naturally in many groves, and still do not occur in some groves today. The suppression of fires leads to ground fuel build-up and the dense growth of fire-sensitive white fir, which increases the risk of more intense fires that can use the firs as ladders to threaten mature giant sequoia crowns. Natural fires may also be important in keeping carpenter ants in check. In 1970, the National Park Service began controlled burns of its groves to correct these problems. Current policies also allow natural fires to burn. One of these untamed burns severely damaged the second-largest tree in the world, the Washington tree, in September 2003, 45 days after the fire started. This damage made it unable to withstand the snowstorm of January 2005, leading to the collapse of over half the trunk.

In addition to fire, two animal agents also assist giant sequoia seed release. The more significant of the two is a longhorn beetle (Phymatodes nitidus) that lays eggs on the cones, into which the larvae then bore holes. Reduction of the vascular water supply to the cone scales allows the cones to dry and open for the seeds to fall. Cones damaged by the beetles during the summer will slowly open over the next several months to a year. Some research indicates many cones, particularly higher in the crowns, may need to be partially dried by beetle damage before fire can fully open them. The other agent is the Douglas squirrel (Tamiasciurus douglasi) that gnaws on the fleshy green scales of younger cones. The squirrels are active year-round, and some seeds are dislodged and dropped as the cone is eaten.

More than 30 identified species of bird have been observed living in giant sequoia groves.This includes the western tanager, violet-green swallow, white-throated swift, Wilson's warbler, olive-sided flycatcher, hermit thrush, western bluebird, and pileated woodpecker.

== Genome ==
The genome of the giant sequoia was published in 2020. The size of the giant sequoia genome is 8.125 Gbp (8.125 billion base pairs) which were assembled into eleven chromosome-scale scaffolds, the largest of any organism at the time of publication. For context, the Genome for the Sequoia sempervirens, the genome of a close relative of the giant sequoia published in 2022 under the same project (Redwood Genome Project), has a genome size that is roughly three times that of the giant sequoia. It was first estimated at 31.5 Gbp, then measured to be 26.5 Gbp in size. This is due to the giant sequoia being a diploid organism, compared to the hexaploid nature of the Sequoia sempervirens. Each hexaploid cell has 6 complete sets of chromosomes, while a diploid only has 2.

Although the giant sequoia has 11 chromosome-scale scaffolds, which aligns with its haploid chromosome number, there are a total of 8125 scaffolds, most of which are under 1 Mbp. It is noted that the largest scaffold is 985 Mbp, the longest continuous sequence for any organism at the time of publication.

This is the first genome sequenced in the family Cupressaceae, and it provides insights into disease resistance and survival for this robust species on a genetic basis. The genome was found to contain over 900 complete or partial predicted NLR genes used by plants to prevent the spread of infection by microbial pathogens. These NLR genes are unevenly distributed throughout the 11 chromosomes, with most of the genes on chromosome one.

The genome sequence was extracted from a single fertilized seed harvested from a 1,360-year-old tree specimen in Sequoia/Kings Canyon National Park identified as SEGI 21. It was sequenced over a three-year period by researchers at University of California, Davis, Johns Hopkins University, University of Connecticut, and Northern Arizona University and was supported by grants from Save the Redwoods League and the National Institute of Food and Agriculture as part of a species conservation, restoration and management effort.

== Discovery and naming ==
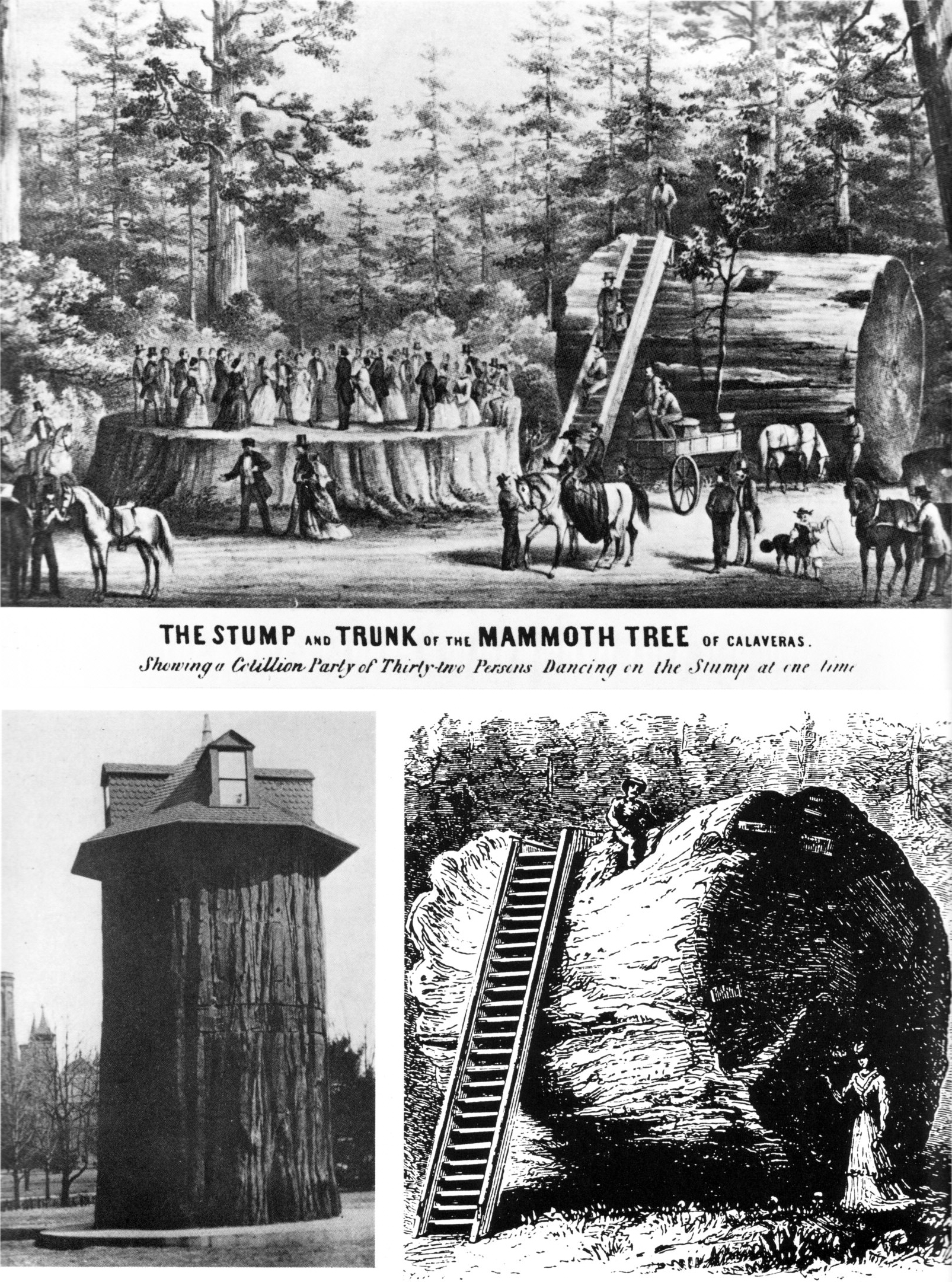
Shortly after their discovery by Europeans, giant sequoias were subject to much exhibition

=== Discovery by European settlers ===
The giant sequoia first gained widespread attention in 1852 when grizzly hunter Augustus T. Dowd discovered the Discovery Tree in Calaveras Grove, marking the species' first widely publicized discovery by non-natives. The tree was cut down in 1853 and exhibited across the United States. The story of Dowd's discovery gained further notoriety following a 1859 feature in Hutchings' Illustrated California Magazine, which promoted tourism to the grove.

Before Augustus T. Dowd's well-known discovery in 1852, there were three earlier encounters with giant sequoias. The first known mention of the giant sequoia by a European American was in 1833 by Zenas Leonard, a member of the Joseph R. Walker Party, who recorded it in his diary. While Leonard did not specify a location, his travels likely took him through Calaveras Grove, but this observation remained unnoticed.

In 1850, John M. Wooster encountered a giant sequoia at Calaveras Grove and carved his initials into the bark of the "Hercules" tree. A year later, in 1851, Robert Eccleston traveled through Nelder Grove with a small detachment of the Mariposa Battalion during the Mariposa War. Similar to Leonard's experience, these encounters also received no publicity.

=== Naming ===
The first scientific naming of the species was by John Lindley in December 1853, who named it Wellingtonia gigantea, without realizing this was an invalid name under the botanical code as the name Wellingtonia had already been used earlier for another unrelated plant (Wellingtonia arnottiana in the family Sabiaceae). The name "Wellingtonia" has persisted in England as a common name. The following year, Joseph Decaisne transferred it to the same genus as the coast redwood, naming it Sequoia gigantea, but this name was also invalid, having been applied earlier (in 1847, by Endlicher) to the coast redwood. The name Washingtonia californica was also applied to it by Winslow in 1854; this name too is invalid, since it was already used for the palm genus Washingtonia.

In 1907, it was placed by Carl Ernst Otto Kuntze in the otherwise fossil genus Steinhauera, but doubt as to whether the giant sequoia is related to the fossil originally so named makes this name invalid.

These nomenclatural oversights were corrected in 1939 by John Theodore Buchholz, who also pointed out the giant sequoia is distinct from the coast redwood at the genus level and coined the name Sequoiadendron giganteum for it.

The etymology of the genus name has been presumed—initially in The Yosemite Book by Josiah Whitney in 1868—to be in honor of Sequoyah (1767–1843), who was the inventor of the Cherokee syllabary. An etymological study published in 2012, however, concluded that the name was more likely to have originated from the Latin sequi (meaning to follow) since the number of seeds per cone in the newly classified genus fell in mathematical sequence with the other four genera in the suborder.

John Muir wrote of the species in about 1870:

"Do behold the King in his glory, King Sequoia! Behold! Behold! seems all I can say. Some time ago I left all for Sequoia and have been and am at his feet, fasting and praying for light, for is he not the greatest light in the woods, in the world? Where are such columns of sunshine, tangible, accessible, terrestrialized?'

== Uses ==
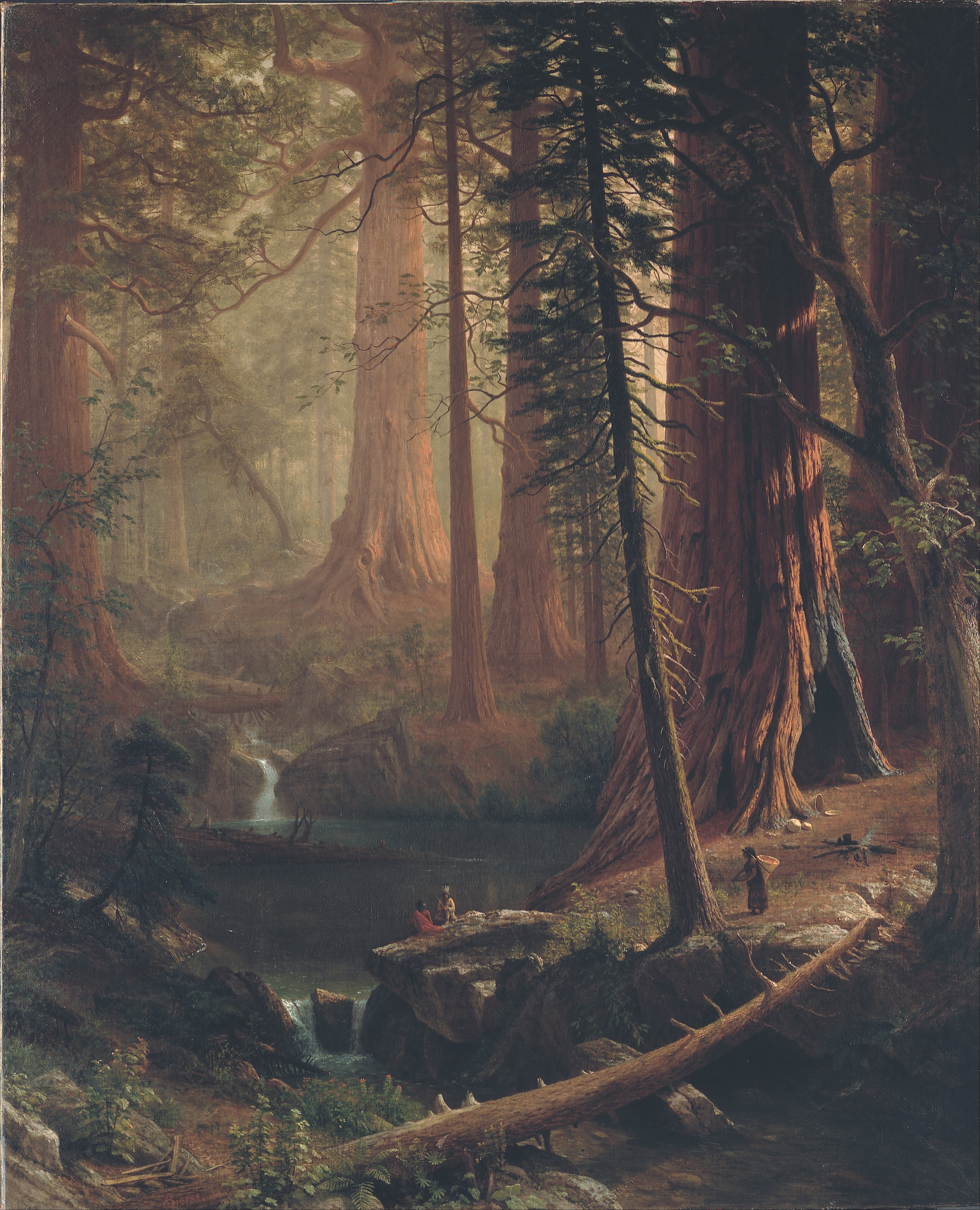
Albert Bierstadt's Giant Redwood Trees of California, 1874 – a large oil on canvas painting in the Berkshire Museum, Massachusetts, United States

Wood from mature giant sequoias is highly resistant to decay, but due to being fibrous and brittle, it is generally unsuitable for construction. From the 1880s through the 1920s, logging took place in many groves in spite of marginal commercial returns. The Hume-Bennett Lumber Company was the last to harvest giant sequoia, going out of business in 1924. Due to their weight and brittleness, trees would often shatter when they hit the ground, wasting much of the wood. Loggers attempted to cushion the impact by digging trenches and filling them with branches. Still, as little as 50% of the timber is estimated to have made it from groves to the mill. The wood was used mainly for shingles and fence posts, or even for matchsticks.

Pictures of the once majestic trees broken and abandoned in formerly pristine groves, and the thought of the giants put to such modest use, spurred the public outcry that caused most of the groves to be preserved as protected land. The public can visit an example of 1880s clear-cutting at Big Stump Grove near General Grant Grove. As late as the 1980s, some immature trees were logged in Sequoia National Forest, publicity of which helped lead to the creation of Giant Sequoia National Monument.

The wood from immature trees is less brittle, with recent tests on young plantation-grown trees showing it similar to coast redwood wood in quality. This is resulting in some interest in cultivating giant sequoia as a very high-yielding timber crop tree, both in California and also in parts of western Europe, where it may grow more efficiently than coast redwoods. In the northwest United States, some entrepreneurs have also begun growing giant sequoias for Christmas trees. Besides these attempts at tree farming, the principal economic uses for giant sequoia today are tourism and horticulture.

== Cultural history ==
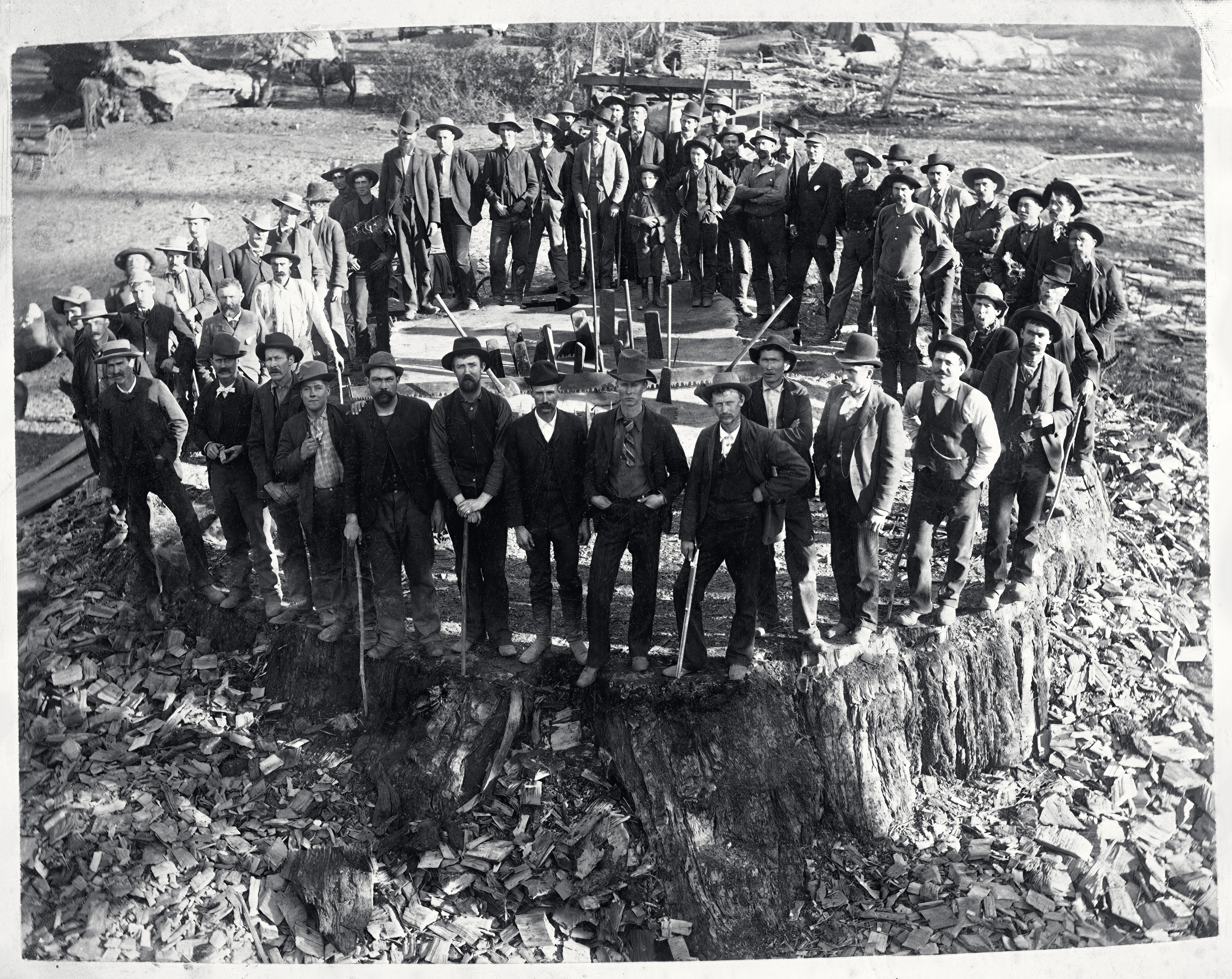
Fifty men stand on the stump of the Mark Twain Tree, a giant sequoia felled for exhibition in 1891.

Giant sequoias became widely known in the United States during the second half of the 19th century. Several prominent trees were felled or stripped for exhibition, with sections of their trunks and bark displayed in cities and at international expositions. The destruction of large trees for exhibition also became part of contemporary debates over the preservation of the remaining giant sequoia groves.

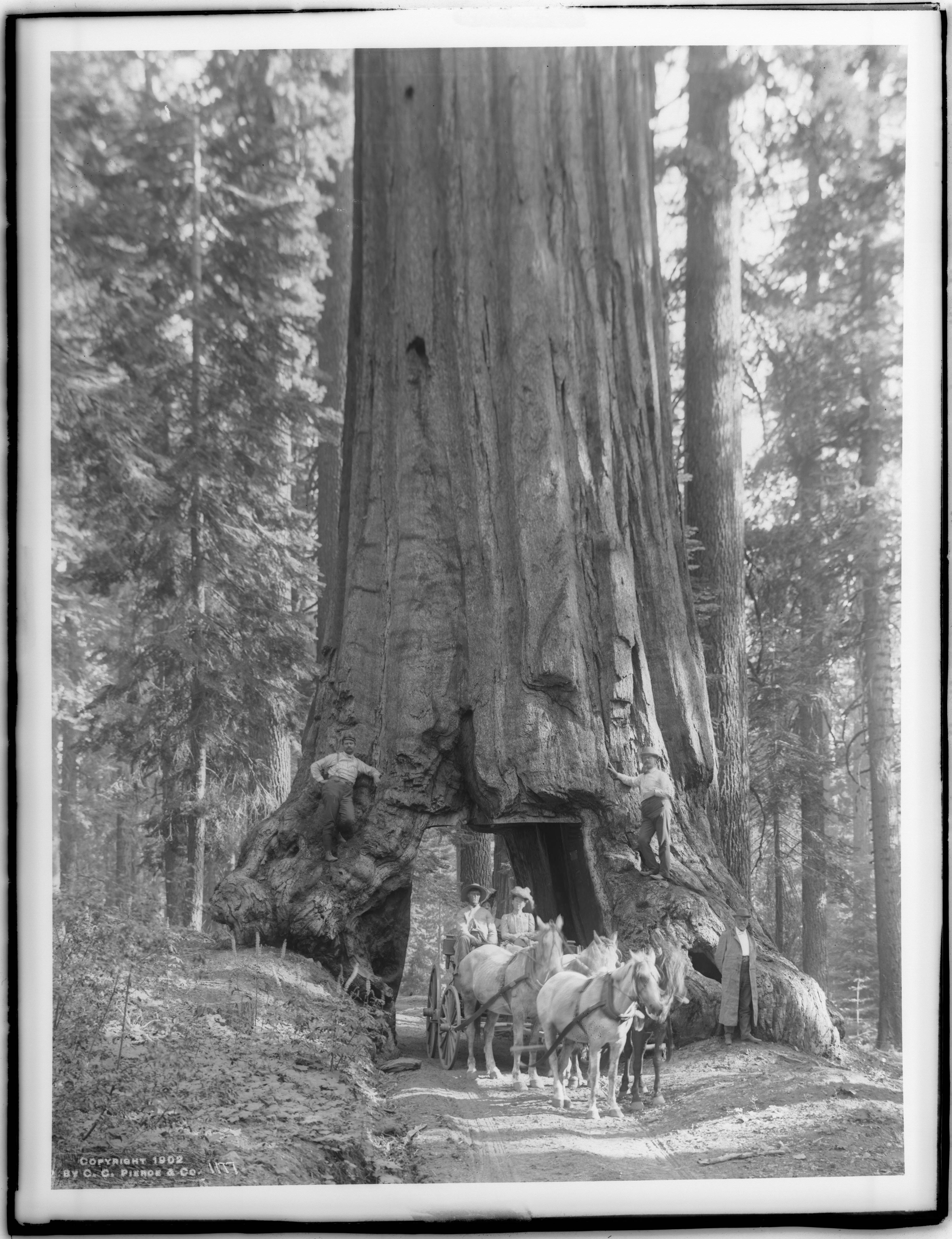
A horse-drawn wagon passing through the Wawona Tunnel Tree in Mariposa Grove.

Giant sequoias also became tourist attractions. In 1881, a tunnel was cut through the Wawona Tunnel Tree in Mariposa Grove to allow horse-drawn stages to pass through it. The tree became one of Yosemite's best-known attractions before falling during the winter of 1968–1969. A second living sequoia in Mariposa Grove, the California Tunnel Tree, was tunneled in 1895 and remains standing.

Individual giant sequoias have also acquired ceremonial and commemorative significance. The General Grant Tree was designated the "Nation's Christmas Tree" in 1926. In 1956, Congress designated it a national shrine honoring members of the United States armed forces who died in service. The National Park Service describes it as the country's only living national shrine.

== Threats ==
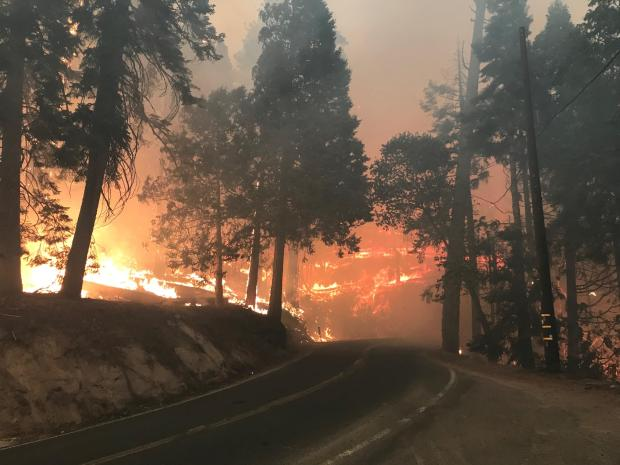
The Castle Fire wiped out a significant portion of the giant sequoia population.

Giant sequoias, once primarily threatened by logging, now face their greatest danger from the absence of regular fires. Fire suppression, severe wildfires, and competition from shade-tolerant species have disrupted the natural cycle that once relied on periodic wildfires to release seeds and clear undergrowth.

Natural wildfires historically played a key role in sequoia reproduction, releasing seeds from cones and clearing undergrowth to create the open, nutrient-rich conditions needed for seedlings. Fire suppression over the last century has disrupted this cycle, limiting reproduction in many groves. Without regular fires, the buildup of fuel and the excessive growth of more fire-sensitive trees, like white fir, have increased the risk of devastating crown fires, which have already destroyed significant portions of the sequoia population.

Many destructive wildfires have hit giant sequoia groves in recent decades, including the McNally Fire in 2002, the Rough Fire in 2015, and the Railroad Fire in 2017. The Castle Fire in 2020 is estimated to have wiped out 10–14% of the giant sequoia population, or about 7,500 to 10,600 mature trees, including the King Arthur Tree, one of the tallest known sequoias. In 2021, the KNP Complex and Windy Fire added to the damage, killing an estimated 3 to 5% more of the population.

Controlled burns have been effective in protecting giant sequoias. In the 2022 Washburn Fire, officials credited prescribed burns in Yosemite National Park with limiting the fire's intensity and sparing Mariposa Grove from major harm. Experts warn that to preserve healthy groves and prevent future destruction, the use of prescribed burns must increase significantly—by about 30 times the current levels.

Only 26% of existing giant sequoia groves have a high resistance to wildfires. The other 38% have moderate resistance, 2% have low resistance, and 16 have no resistance whatsoever. The last 18% have been wiped out.

== Around the world ==
Giant sequoia is a very popular ornamental tree in many areas. It is successfully grown in most of western and southern Europe, the Pacific Northwest of North America, north to southwest British Columbia, the southern United States, southeast Australia, New Zealand and central-southern Chile. It is also grown, though less successfully, in parts of eastern North America.

Trees can withstand temperatures of −31 °C (−25 °F) or colder for short periods of time, provided the ground around the roots is insulated with either heavy snow or mulch. Outside its natural range, the foliage can suffer from damaging windburn.

A wide range of horticultural varieties have been selected, especially in Europe, including blue, compact blue, powder blue, hazel smith, pendulum—or weeping—varieties, and grafted cultivars.

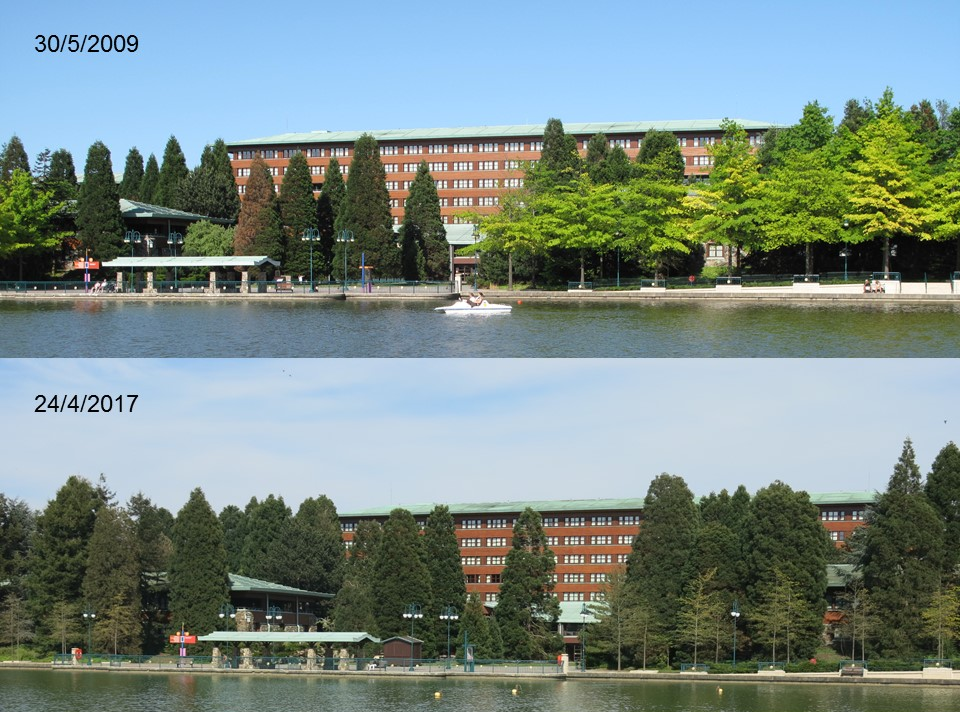
Sequoias in Eurodisney (near Paris) in 2009 and 2017

=== France ===
The tallest giant sequoia ever measured outside of the United States is a specimen planted near Ribeauvillé in France in 1856 and measured in 2014 at a height between 57.7 m (189 ft) and 58.1 m (191 ft) at age 158 years.

=== United Kingdom ===
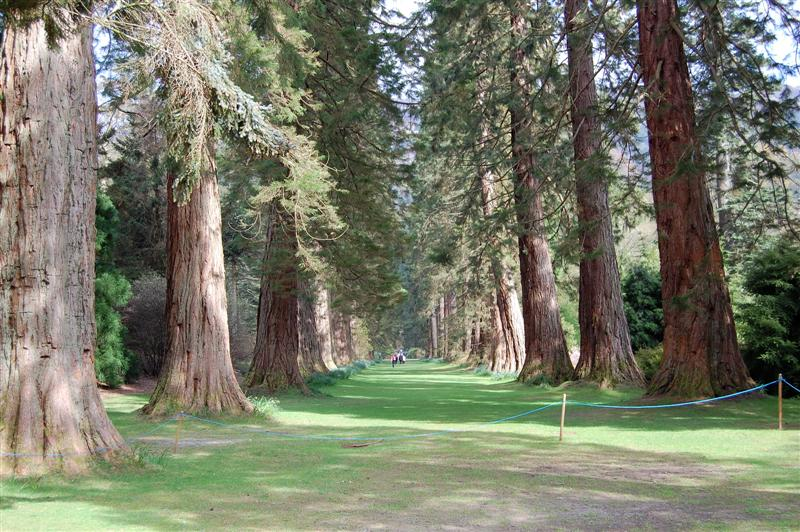
The well-known giant sequoia avenue planted in 1863 at Benmore Botanic Garden, Scotland. These trees are all over 50 metres (160 ft) tall

The giant sequoia was first brought into cultivation in Britain in 1853 by the horticulturist Patrick Matthew of Perthshire from seeds sent by his botanist son John in California. A much larger shipment of seed collected from the Calaveras Grove by William Lobb, acting for the Veitch Nursery near Exeter, arrived in England in December 1853; seed from this batch was widely distributed throughout Europe.

Growth in Britain is very fast, with the tallest tree, at Benmore in southwest Scotland, reaching 56.4 m (185 ft) in 2014 at age 150 years, and several others from 50–53 m (164–174 ft) tall; the stoutest is around 12 m (39 ft) in girth and 4 m (13 ft) in diameter, in Perthshire. The Royal Botanic Gardens at Kew, and in their second campus at Wakehurst, contain multiple large specimens of the species. Biddulph Grange Garden in Staffordshire holds a fine collection of both Sequoiadendron giganteum and Sequoia sempervirens (coast redwood). The appropriately 2,500 year-old General Sherman of California has a volume of 1,489 m^{3} (52,600 cu ft); by way of comparison, the largest giant sequoias in Great Britain have volumes no greater than 90–100 m^{3} (3,200–3,500 cu ft), one example being the 90 m^{3} (3,200 cu ft) specimen in the New Forest.

Sequoiadendron giganteum has gained the Royal Horticultural Society's Award of Garden Merit.

An avenue of 218 giant sequoias was planted in 1865 near the town of Camberley, Surrey, England. The trees have since been surrounded by modern real estate development.

In 2024, there were 4,949 notable sequoias in the UK. There is uncertainty if this is an undercount or overcount of the trees. In addition there are an estimated 500,000 younger Sequoiadendron giganteum and Sequoia sempervirens. Growing conditions for these trees are on par with their native range in the US, though reproduction requires human intervention. It is believed that most trees in the United Kingdom will grow to similar sizes as their counterparts in their native range, being well-suited to the UK's wetter climate, though trees on par to the giants in California are unlikely due to potential damage from high winds and lightning strikes. A study conducted in 2024 found that the average S. giganteum tree can absorb as much as 85 kilograms of carbon per year, more than many other tree species in the UK.

=== Germany ===
Probably the oldest sequoia in Germany and possibly of continental Europe was planted in 1852 as a gift of the British Royal Family to the Landgraviate of Hesse-Darmstadt in a park near Bensheim. In 2015 it reached a height of 44.35 meters (145.5 ft) and a circumference of 5.94 meters (19.5 ft) and is praised for its beauty. It is also the largest sequoia in Germany.

King William I of Württemberg (1816–1864) imported seeds shortly before his death. In the greenhouses of the Wilhelma in Stuttgart grew between 5000 and 8000 seedlings. Thirty-five of those trees are still present in the Wilhelma. The seedlings got distributed to the whole country of Württemberg and elsewhere and planted on different soils, under various conditions and elevations for a long-time evaluation to find out if they are suitable for forestry. At least 135 of them still can be traced back to these seedlings.

Since then the tree is well established as ornamental tree in public parks and cemeteries, but also on private properties and can be found planted in small groups in the woods.

Two members of the German Dendrology Society, E. J. Martin and Illa Martin, introduced the giant sequoia into German forestry at the Sequoiafarm Kaldenkirchen in 1952.

=== Italy ===
Numerous giant sequoia were planted in Italy from 1860 through 1905. Several regions contain specimens that range from 40 to 48 metres (131 to 157 ft) in height. The largest tree is in Roccavione, in the Piedmont, with a basal circumference of 16 metres (52 ft). One notable tree survived a 200-metre (660 ft) tall flood wave in 1963 that was caused by a landslide at Vajont Dam. There are numerous giant sequoia in parks and reserves; one of Italy's most famous sites with giant sequoia trees is in the Sammezzano which has both giant redwood (Sequoiadendron giganteum) and coast redwood (Sequoia sempervirens).

Growth rates in some areas of Europe are remarkable. One young tree in Italy reached 22 m (72 ft) tall and 88 cm (2.89 ft) trunk diameter in 17 years.

=== Northern, Central and Southeast Europe ===
Growth further northeast in Europe is limited by winter cold. In Denmark, where extreme winters can reach −32 °C (−26 °F), the largest tree was 35 m (115 ft) tall and 1.7 m (5.6 ft) diameter in 1976 and is bigger today. One in Poland has purportedly survived temperatures down to −37 °C (−35 °F) with heavy snow cover.

Twenty-nine giant sequoias, measuring around 30 m (98 ft) in height, grow in Belgrade's municipality of Lazarevac in Serbia.

The oldest Sequoiadendron in the Czech Republic, at 44 m (144 ft), grows in Ratměřice u Votic castle garden.

In Slatina, Croatia, 32.5 m (107 ft) tall giant sequoia grows in city park. Presumably seeded in 1890 and proclaimed as nature monument in 1967, now stands as a centerpiece in town's educational, presentational and informational center with tourist facilities available.

Above the city of Kyustendil, Bulgaria, there are around 100 giant sequoias, oldest being around 100 years old.

=== United States and Canada ===
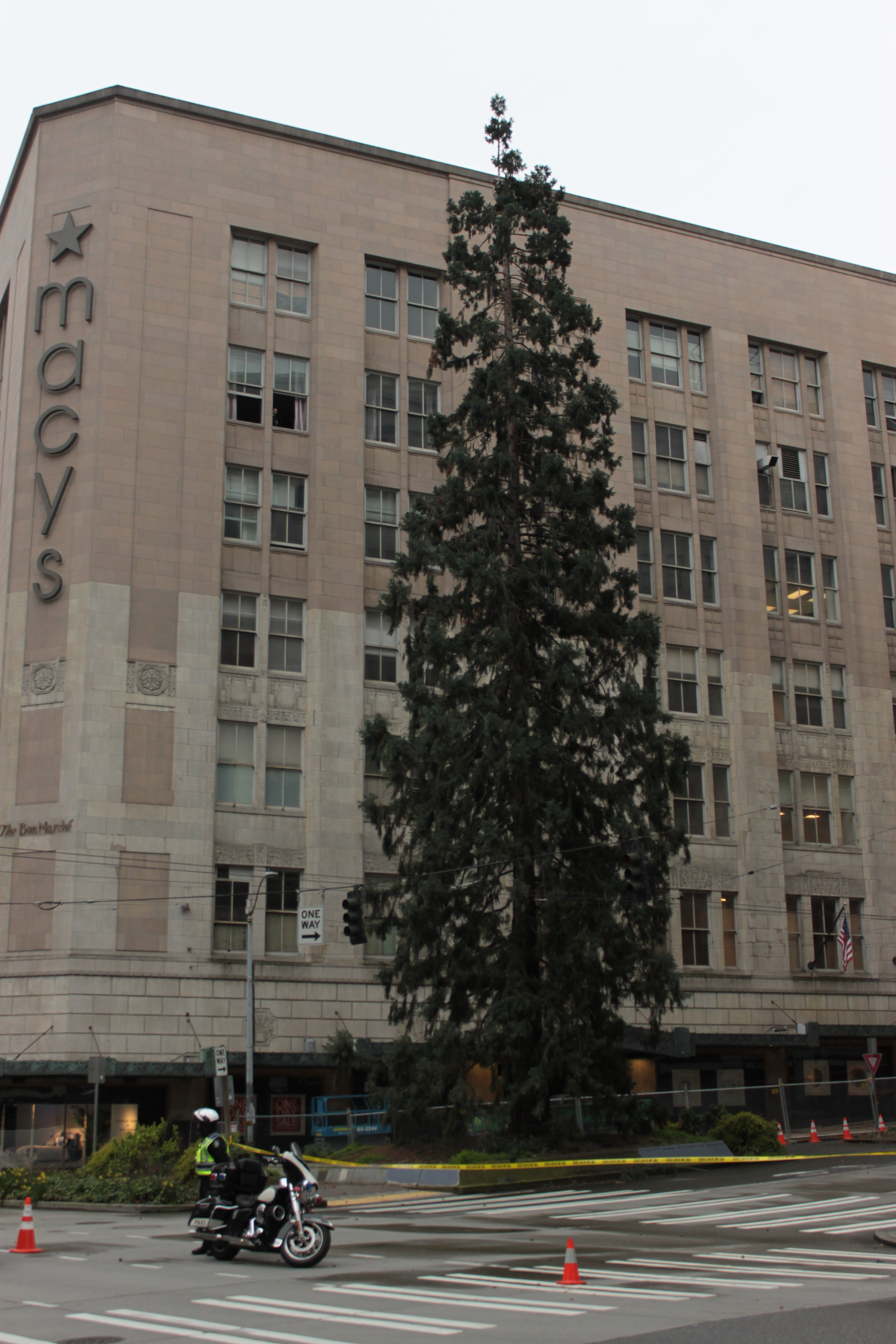
The giant sequoia tree in downtown Seattle, located adjacent to the historic The Bon Marché building, is unique for its urban setting.

Giant sequoias are grown successfully in the Pacific Northwest and southern US, and less successfully in eastern North America. Giant sequoia cultivation is very successful in the Pacific Northwest from western Oregon north to southwest British Columbia, with fast growth rates. In Washington and Oregon, it is common to find giant sequoias that have been successfully planted in both urban and rural areas. There are hundreds of sequoias planted on the Olympic Peninsula over the last 100 years and farms that have 50 or more planted 40 years ago or longer.

In Seattle, a 100 ft (30 m) sequoia stands as a prominent landmark at the entrance to Seattle's downtown retail core. Other large specimens exceeding 90 ft (27 m) are located on the University of Washington and Seattle University campuses, in the Evergreen Washelli Memorial Park cemetery, and in the Leschi, Madrona, and Magnolia neighborhoods.

In the northeastern US there has been some limited success in growing the species, but growth is much slower there, and it is prone to Cercospora and Kabatina fungal diseases due to the hot, humid summer climate there. A tree at Blithewold Gardens, in Bristol, Rhode Island, is reported to be 27 metres (89 ft) tall, reportedly the tallest in the New England states. The tree at the Tyler Arboretum in Delaware County, Pennsylvania, at 29.1 metres (95 ft) may be the tallest in the northeast. Specimens also grow in the Arnold Arboretum in Boston, Massachusetts (planted 1972, 18 m tall in 1998), at Longwood Gardens near Wilmington, Delaware, in the New Jersey State Botanical Garden at Skylands in Ringwood State Park, Ringwood, New Jersey, and in the Finger Lakes region of New York. Private plantings of giant sequoias around the Middle Atlantic States are not uncommon, and other publicly accessible specimens can be visited at the U.S. National Arboretum in Washington, D.C. A few trees have been established in Colorado and New Mexico as far south as Albuquerque where it is sparsely found and with little to no supplemental irrigation leading to reduced growth, but showing its drought resistance. Additionally, numerous sequoias have been planted with success in the state of Michigan.

A cold-tolerant cultivar 'Hazel Smith' selected in about 1960 is proving more successful in the northeastern US. This clone was the sole survivor of several hundred seedlings grown at a nursery in New Jersey. The U.S. National Arboretum has a specimen grown from a cutting in 1970 that can be seen in the Gotelli Conifer Collection.

Since its last assessment as an endangered species in 2011, it was estimated that another 13–19% of the population (or 9,761–13,637 mature trees) were destroyed during the Castle Fire of 2020 and the KNP Complex & Windy Fire in 2021, events attributed to fire suppression and drought. Prescribed burns to reduce available fuel load may be crucial for saving the species.

As of 2021, there are approximately 60,000 living in its native California.

=== Australia ===
The Ballarat Botanical Gardens contain a significant collection, many of them about 150 years old. Jubilee Park and the Hepburn Mineral Springs Reserve in Daylesford, Cook Park in Orange, New South Wales and Carisbrook's Deep Creek park in Victoria both have specimens. Jamieson Township in the Victorian high country has two specimens which were planted in the early 1860s.

In Tasmania, specimens can be seen in private and public gardens, as sequoias were popular in the mid-Victorian era. The Westbury Village Green has specimens with more in Deloraine. The Tasmanian Arboretum contains both Sequoiadendron giganteum and Sequoia sempervirens specimens.

St David's Park in Hobart, Tasmania, has two Sequoiadendron giganteum planted in 1937 to commemorate the coronation of King George VI and Queen Elizabeth. In December 2025, the City of Hobart reported that one tree was showing significant signs of distress and was being monitored by arborists; both trees are listed by the National Trust as being of state significance.

The Pialligo Redwood Forest consists of 3,000 surviving redwood specimens, of 122,000 planted, 500 meters east of the Canberra Airport. The forest was laid out by the city's designer Walter Burley Griffin, though the city's arborist, Thomas Charles Weston, advised against it. The National Arboretum Canberra began a grove of Sequoiadendron giganteum in 2008. They also grow in the abandoned arboretum at Mount Banda Banda in New South Wales.

=== New Zealand ===
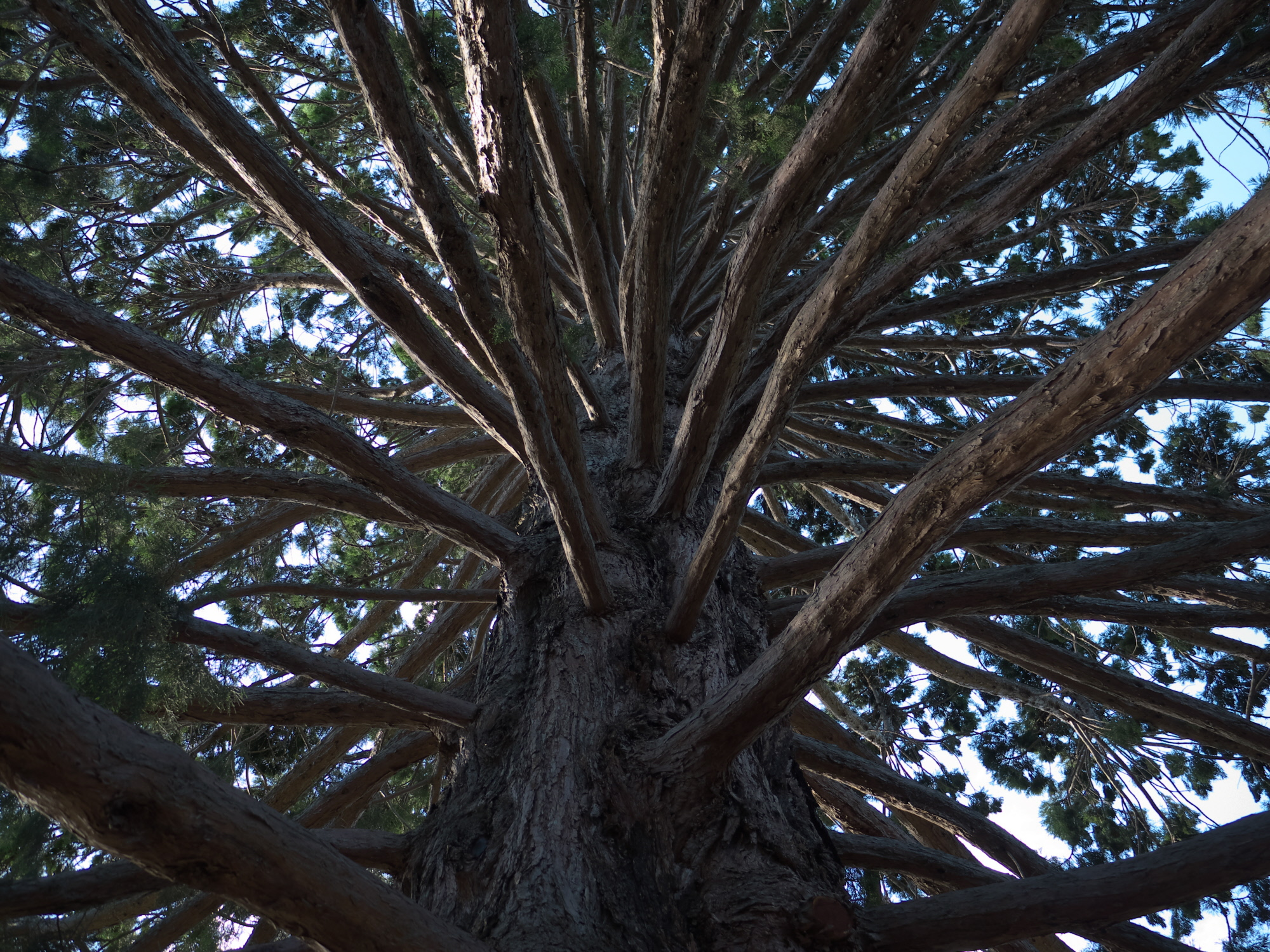
S. giganteum in Queenstown, New Zealand

Several impressive specimens of Sequoiadendron giganteum can be found in the South Island of New Zealand. Notable examples include a set of trees in a public park of Picton, as well as robust specimens in the public and botanical parks of Christchurch and Queenstown. There are also several in private gardens in Wānaka. Other locations in Christchurch and nearby include a number of trees at the Riccarton Park Racecourse, three large trees on the roadside bordering private properties on Clyde Road, near Wai-Iti Terrace—these are at least 150 years old. The suburb of 'Redwood' is named after a 160 years old Giant Redwood tree in the grounds of a local hotel. At St James Church, Harewood, is a protected very large specimen believed to be about 160 years old. A grove of about sixteen Redwood trees of varying ages is in Sheldon Park in the Belfast, New Zealand suburb. Some of these trees are in poor condition because of indifferent care. There is also a very large tree at Rangiora High School, which was planted for Queen Victoria's Golden Jubilee and is thus over 130 years old.

== Record trees ==
=== Largest by trunk volume ===
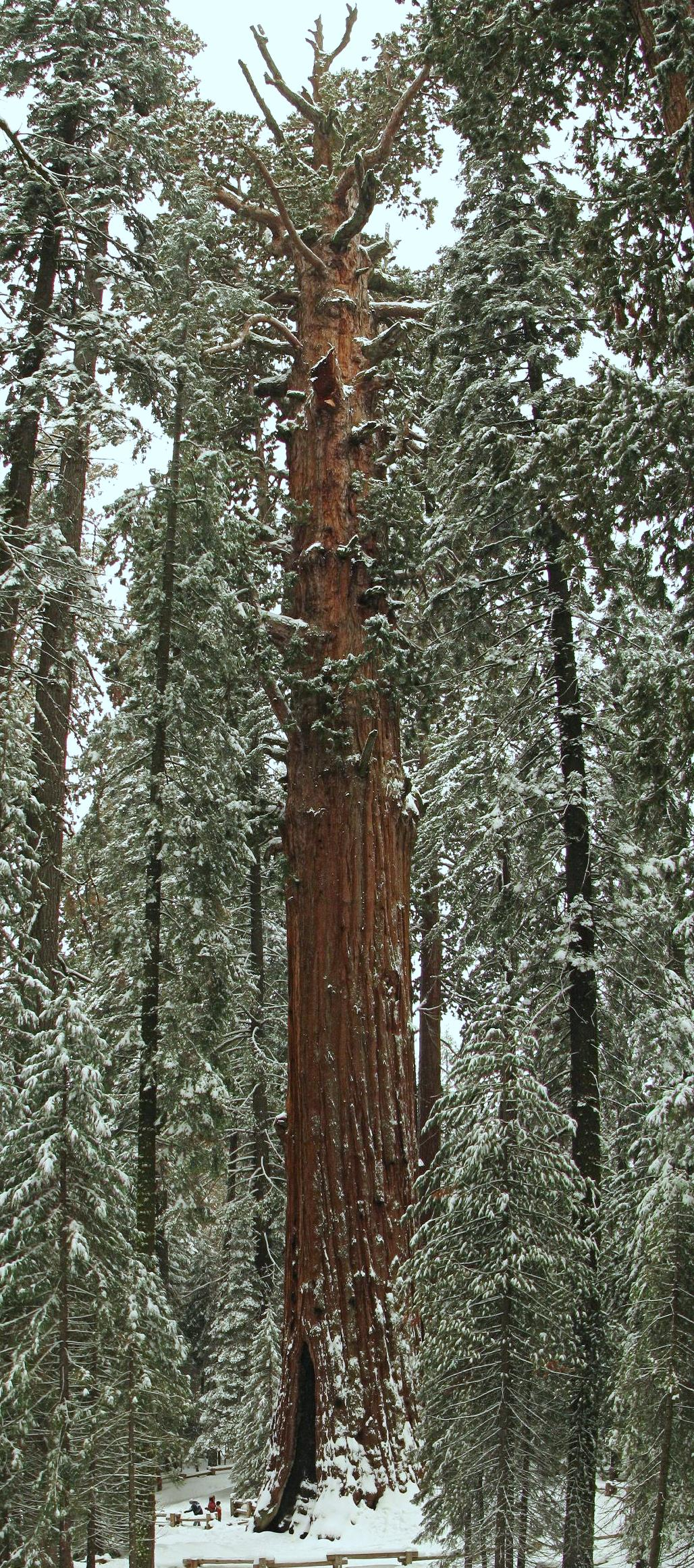
General Sherman, largest known living single stem tree in the world

As of 2009, the top ten largest giant sequoias sorted by volume of their trunks are: (Note: The volume figures have a low degree of accuracy (at best about ±14 cubic feet or 0.40 cubic metres), due to difficulties in measurement; stem diameter measurements are taken at a few set heights up the trunk, and assume that the trunk is circular in cross-section, and that taper between measurement points is even. The volume measurements also do not take cavities into account. The measurements are trunk-only, and do not include the volume of wood in the branches or roots.)

Rank	Tree Name	Grove	Height	Girth at ground	Volume
1	General Sherman	Giant Forest	275 ft (84 m)	103 ft (31 m)	52,508 ft^{3} (1,490 m^{3})
2 (Note: This table presents giant sequoias sorted by the volume of their trunks. In December 2012, Stephen Sillett announced a measurement of The President tree with a total of 54,000 ft^{3} (1,530 m^{3}) of wood and 9,000 ft^{3} (250 m^{3}) of wood in the branches. Ranked according to the total amount of wood in the tree, the General Sherman tree is first, The President tree is second, and the General Grant tree is third. General Sherman has 2,000 ft^{3} (60 m^{3}) more wood than the President tree.)	General Grant	General Grant Grove	268 ft (82 m)	108 ft (33 m)	46,608 ft^{3} (1,320 m^{3})
3	The President	Giant Forest	241 ft (73 m)	93 ft (28 m)	45,148 ft^{3} (1,280 m^{3})
4	Lincoln	Giant Forest	256 ft (78 m)	98 ft (30 m)	44,471 ft^{3} (1,260 m^{3})
5	Stagg	Alder Creek Grove	243 ft (74 m)	109 ft (33 m)	42,557 ft^{3} (1,210 m^{3})
6	Boole	Converse Basin	269 ft (82 m)	113 ft (34 m)	42,472 ft^{3} (1,200 m^{3})
7	Genesis	Mountain Home Grove	253 ft (77 m)	85 ft (26 m)	41,897 ft^{3} (1,190 m^{3})
8	Franklin	Giant Forest	224 ft (68 m)	95 ft (29 m)	41,280 ft^{3} (1,170 m^{3})
9	King Arthur	Garfield Grove	270 ft (82 m)	104 ft (32 m)	40,656 ft^{3} (1,150 m^{3})
10	Monroe	Giant Forest	248 ft (76 m)	91 ft (28 m)	40,104 ft^{3} (1,140 m^{3})

- The General Sherman tree is estimated to weigh about 2100 tonnes.
- The Washington Tree was previously arguably the second-largest tree with a volume of 47,850 ft^{3} (1,350 m^{3}) (although the upper half of its trunk was hollow, making the calculated volume debatable), but after losing the hollow upper half of its trunk in January 2005 following a fire, it is no longer of great size.
- The largest giant sequoia ever recorded was the Father of the Forest from Calaveras Grove, an exceedingly massive tree which fell many centuries ago in the North Grove. Reportedly, the tree was once over 435 ft tall, and 110 ft in circumference, with a minimum height of 365 feet. Now, what is left of the tree is a popular tourist attraction.

=== Tallest ===
- Redwood – Redwood Mountain Grove – 95 metres (311 ft)
- tallest outside the United States: specimen near Ribeauvillé, France, measured in 2014 at a height of 58 m (190 ft) at age 158 years.

=== Oldest ===
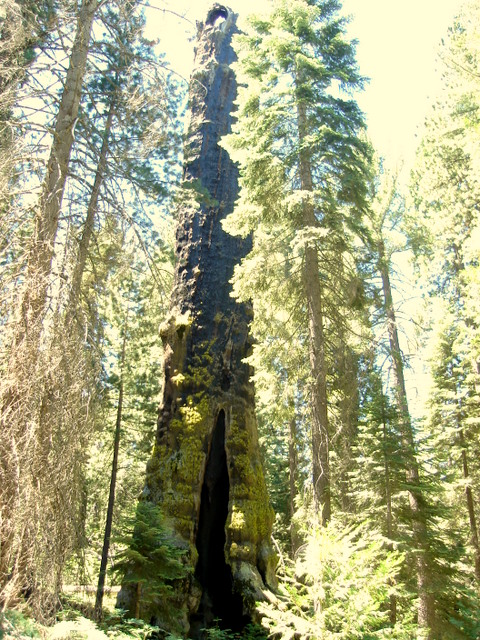
The Muir Snag, believed to be over 3500 years old

- Muir Snag – Converse Basin Grove – more than 3500 years

=== Greatest girth ===
- Waterfall Tree – Alder Creek Grove – 47 metres (155 ft) – tree with enormous basal buttress on very steep ground.

=== Greatest base diameter ===
- Waterfall Tree – Alder Creek Grove – 21 metres (69 ft) – tree with enormous basal buttress on very steep ground.
- Tunnel Tree – Atwell Mill Grove – 17 metres (57 ft) – tree with a huge flared base that has burned all the way through.

=== Greatest mean diameter at breast height ===
- General Grant – General Grant Grove – 8.8 metres (29 ft)

=== Largest limb ===
- Arm Tree – Atwell Mill, East Fork Grove – 4.0 metres (13 ft) in diameter

=== Thickest bark ===
- 0.9 metres (3 ft) or more

== See also ==
- Mother of the Forest
- Discovery Tree
- The House (trees)
- Largest organisms
- List of individual trees
- Kings Canyon National Park
- Yosemite National Park
- Calaveras Big Trees State Park
- Old growth forest
- List of superlative trees

== Sources ==
- Aune, P. S., ed. (1994). Proceedings of the Symposium on Giant Sequoias. US Dept. of Agriculture Forest Service (Pacific Southwest Research Station). General Technical Report PSW-GTR-151. Archived from the original on October 20, 2011.
- Flint, W. D. (2002). To Find The Biggest Tree. Sequoia Natural History Association, Inc. ISBN 1-878441-09-4.
- Mitchell, Alan (1996). Alan Mitchell's Trees of Britain. HarperCollins. ISBN 0-00-219972-6.
- Harvey, H. Thomas; Shellhammer, Howard S.; Stecker, Ronald E. (1980). Giant Sequoia Ecology: Fire and Reproduction. Scientific Monograph Series. Vol. 12. Washington, DC: U.S. National Park Service. Archived from the original on September 28, 2022.
- Kilgore, B. (1970). "Restoring Fire to the Sequoias". National Parks and Conservation Magazine. 44 (277): 16–22.
- Zsolt Debreczy; Istvan Racz (2012). Kathy Musial (ed.). Conifers Around the World (1st ed.). DendroPress. p. 1089. ISBN 978-963-219-061-7. Archived from the original on December 8, 2015.
- White, J. R.; Fry, W. (1938). Big Trees. United Kingdom: Stanford University Press.
- "Giant sequoias are a rapidly growing feature of the UK landscape". March 13, 2024.
