= Flook =

Flook may refer to:

== People with the surname ==
- Adrian Flook (born 1963), British politician
- Chris Flook (born 1973), Bermudan swimmer
- D. Charles Flook (died 1945), American politician from Maryland
- John Gurley Flook (1839–1926), American politician
- Maria Flook, American writer
- Tim Flook, American politician

== Other uses ==
- Flook (app), an iPhone application
- Flook (band), an Anglo-Irish band
- Flook (comic strip)

== See also ==
- Parker v. Flook, a 1978 United States Supreme Court case
- Fluke (disambiguation)
