= Flume (disambiguation) =

A flume is a man-made gravity chute for water, with raised walls.

Flume or The Flume may also refer to:

- Flume (musician), an Australian electronic musician, producer and DJ
  - Flume (album), his eponymous 2012 album
- Flume Gorge, a natural gorge in Franconia Notch State Park, New Hampshire, United States
- The Flume (Alton Towers), a log ride in Staffordshire
- "Flume", a song by Bon Iver from the 2007 album For Emma, Forever Ago
- Flume, an alternative name for a recreational water slide
- Werner Flume (1908–2009), a German jurist
- Captain Flume, character in Catch-22

== Other uses ==
- Apache Flume, a service for collecting, aggregating, and moving large amounts of log data
- Log flume, used to transport lumber and logs down mountainous terrain to a sawmill by using flowing water
- Log flume (ride), amusement rides consisting of a water flume and artificial hollow logs or boats

== See also ==
- Flame (disambiguation)
- Fluke (disambiguation)
