= Millwood, California =

Former logging boomtown in Fresno County, California, US

Millwood
- Former settlement
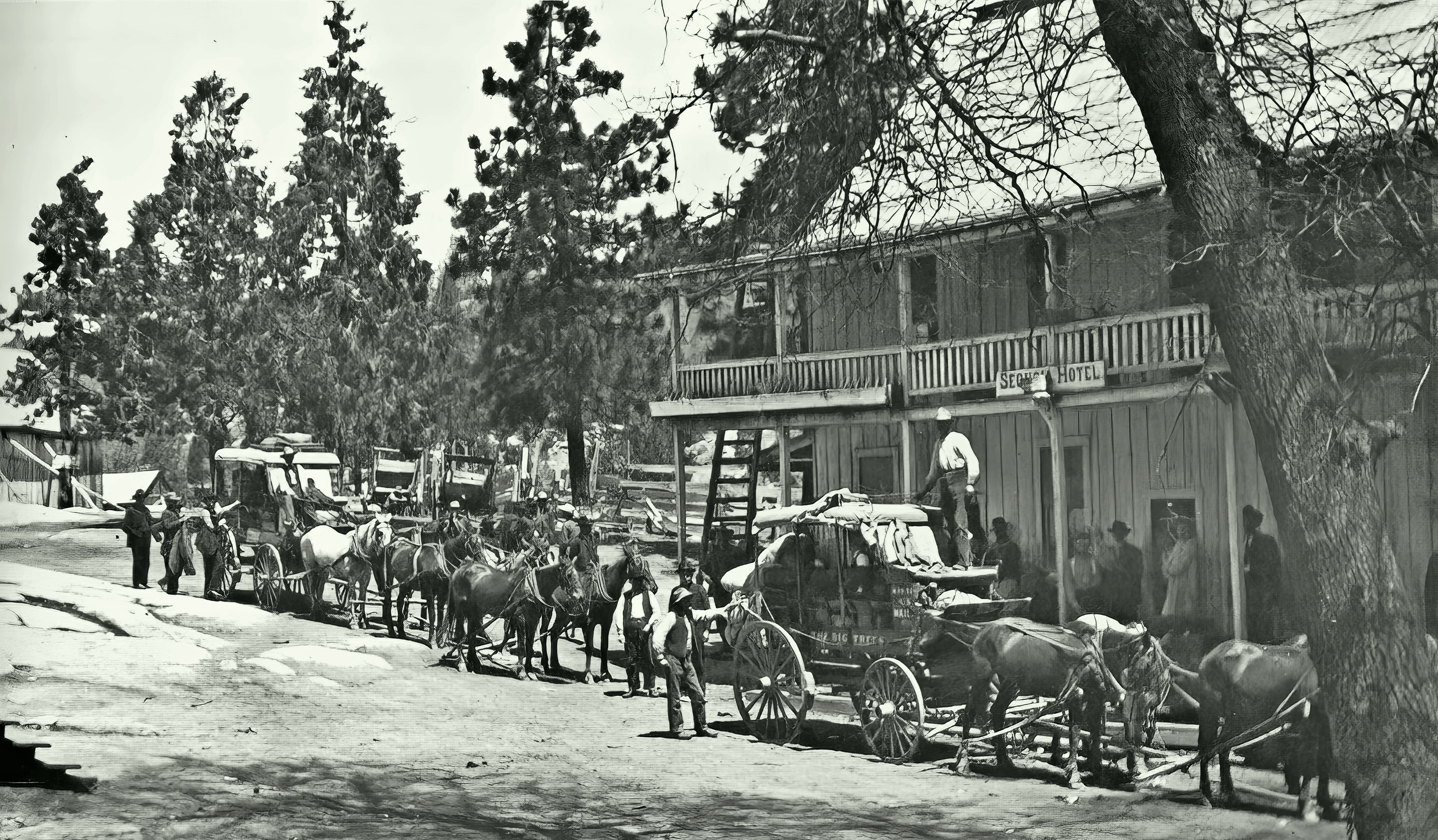
- The Big Trees Stage at the Sequoia Hotel in Millwood.

- Location in California
- Coordinates: 36°43′42″N 118°59′51″W
- Country: United States
- State: California
- County: Fresno
- Elevation: 3,584 ft (1,092 m)

Millwood was a lumber boomtown located in present-day Sequoia National Forest near Converse Basin Grove in California, United States. It was established in 1891 by the Kings River Lumber Company and was connected to the Sequoia Railroad, which brought logs to the town to be turned into rough lumber. The lumber was then transported by log flume to Sanger, a journey of 54 miles. At its peak, Millwood had a population of over 2,000 people and featured two hotels, a summer school, and a post office. However, today there are no remaining structures or buildings at the Millwood site.

== History ==
In 1888, the Kings River Lumber Company was founded by Hiram T. Smith and Austin D. Moore. As part of their operation, they constructed the Millwood sawmill, a high-elevation mill located near the headwaters of the Kings River. The mill was connected to a 54-mile log flume, which transported lumber from the mill to the town of Sanger. Sequoia Lake, a man-made reservoir, served as the source of water for the flume.

In the late 1800s, Millwood was a thriving lumber city with a workforce of over 2,000 people during the April to November lumber season. The town had a range of amenities including a summer school, post office, store, blacksmith shop, and butcher shop. Loggers lived in rough dormitories and ate at a common cookhouse. There were also two hotels, the Sequoia Hotel and the Red House Hotel, which provided meals and beds for two-bits each. There were also summer shacks available for rent. There was a red-light district a mile south of the main town.

In the early 1890s, Fresno County built a new stage road connecting the town of Sanger to Millwood, improving access to the Sierra region. This led to an increase in people visiting the Converse Basin Grove and the newly established General Grant National Park. The stagecoach journey took 12 hours and covered a distance of 47 miles, running three times per week. However, the stagecoach also became a target for robberies, with outlaws Christopher Evans and John Sontag carrying out a holdup on the Millwood coach in 1892.

Pioneer photographer C.C. Curtis established a photography studio in Millwood, near the Sequoia Hotel, between 1887 and 1893. During this time, he used large scale glass plate negatives to photograph the loggers and tourists in the area. The surviving images captured by Curtis are some of the only surviving photographs of the giant sequoia logging era.

== Decline ==
In 1905, the Hume-Bennett Lumber Company, the successor to the Kings River Lumber Company, relocated its logging operations to a new site and established the town of Hume. The company built a new logging complex, which included Hume Lake. This became the new center of economic activity in the area. As a result, Millwood quickly declined. The landmark White House Hotel burned in 1908. By 1909, the mill had closed and the remaining machinery moved the ten miles to Hume.

Today, Millwood is a ghost town with no remaining buildings. The town's former site is currently marked by a United States Forest Service off-highway vehicle (OHV) area. A historical marker was installed in 1965 in nearby Squaw Valley, located at the intersection of Highway 180 and National Forest Road 13S97. It's on the right when traveling west on Highway 180, located near the post office.

== Gallery ==
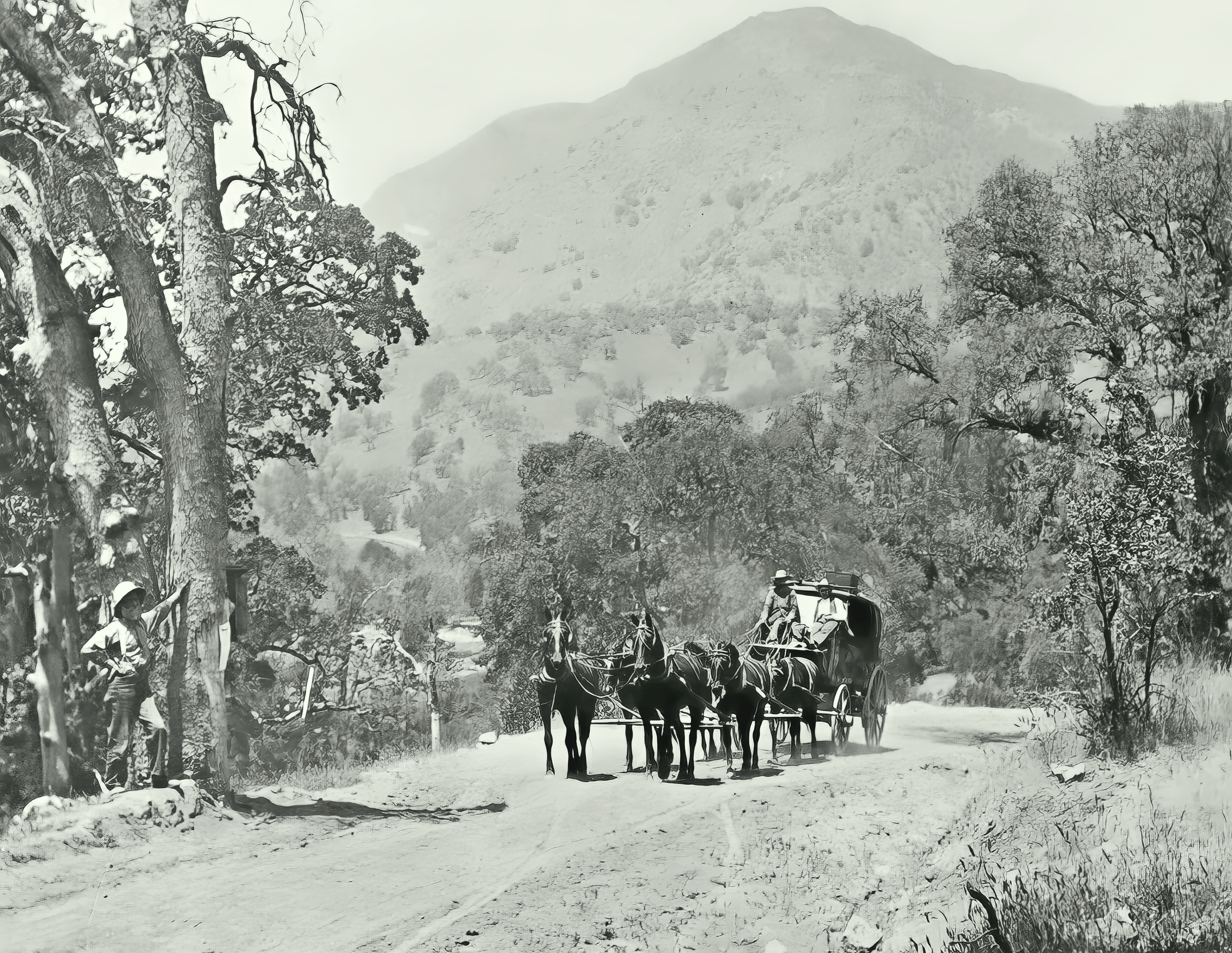
The stage road to Millwood climbed up through Squaw Valley, Dunlap, Deer Park, and past Sontag Point

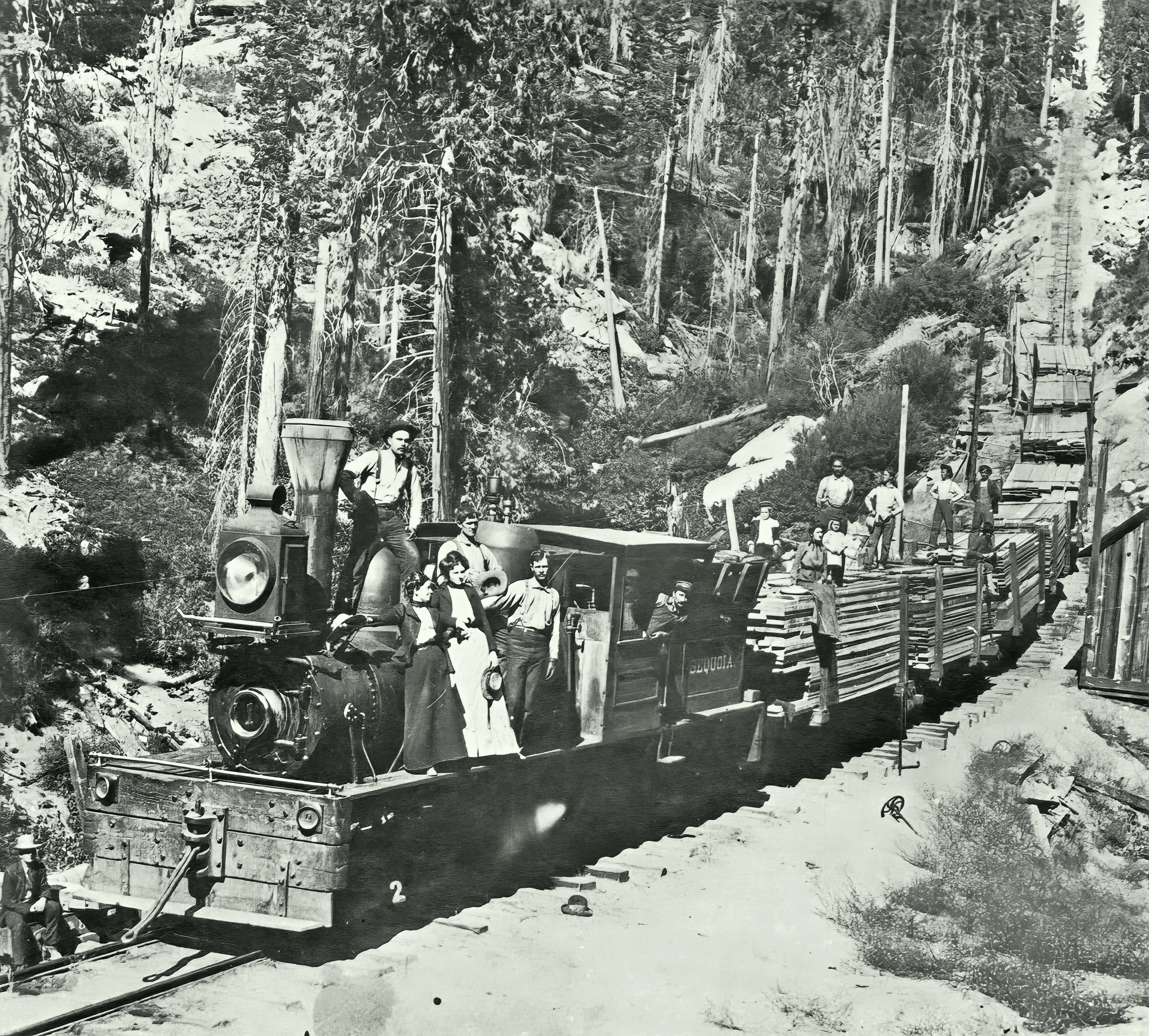
The Sequoia Railroad hauls rough cut timber on the short line to Millwood

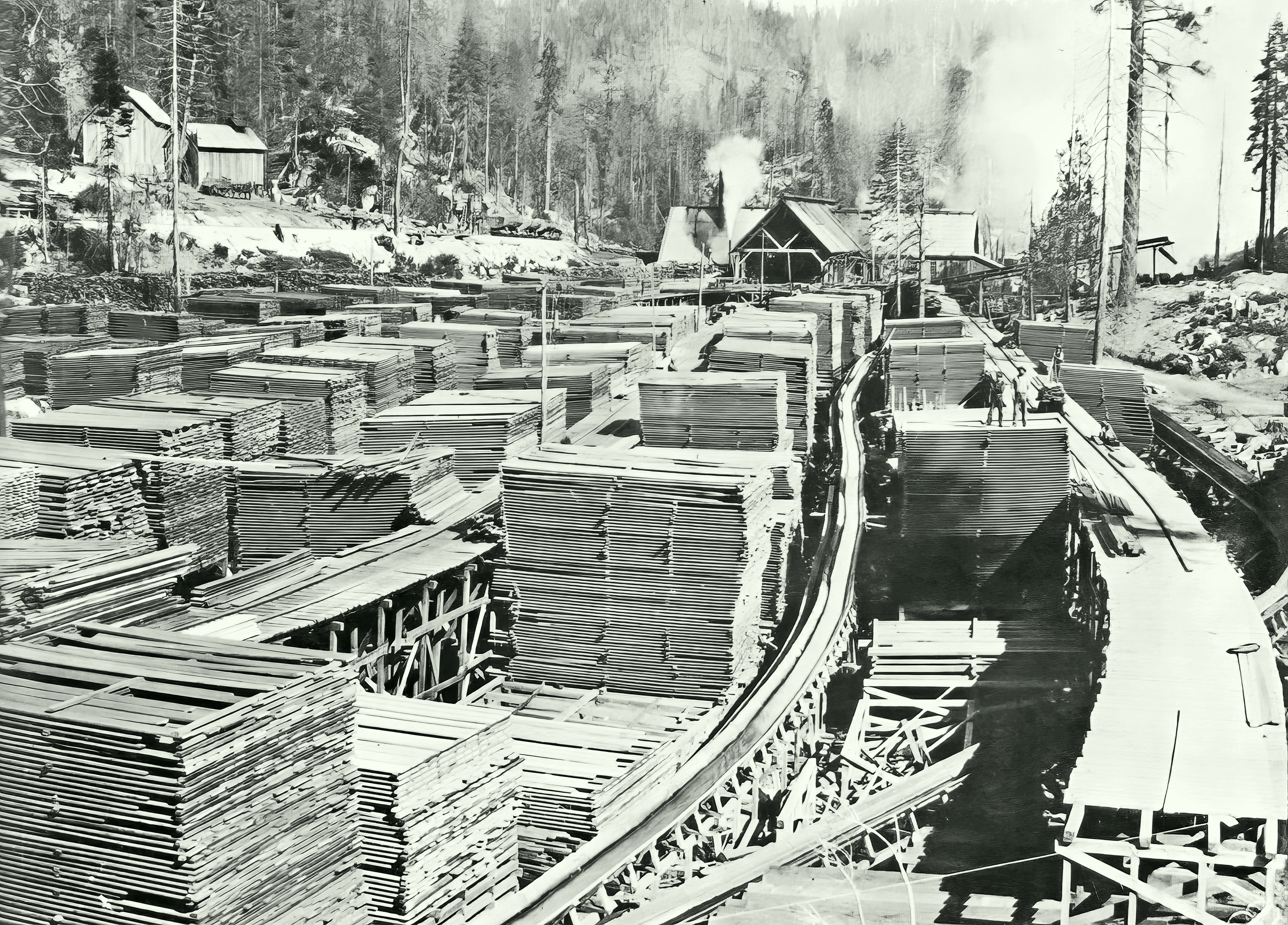
Millwood Drying Yards

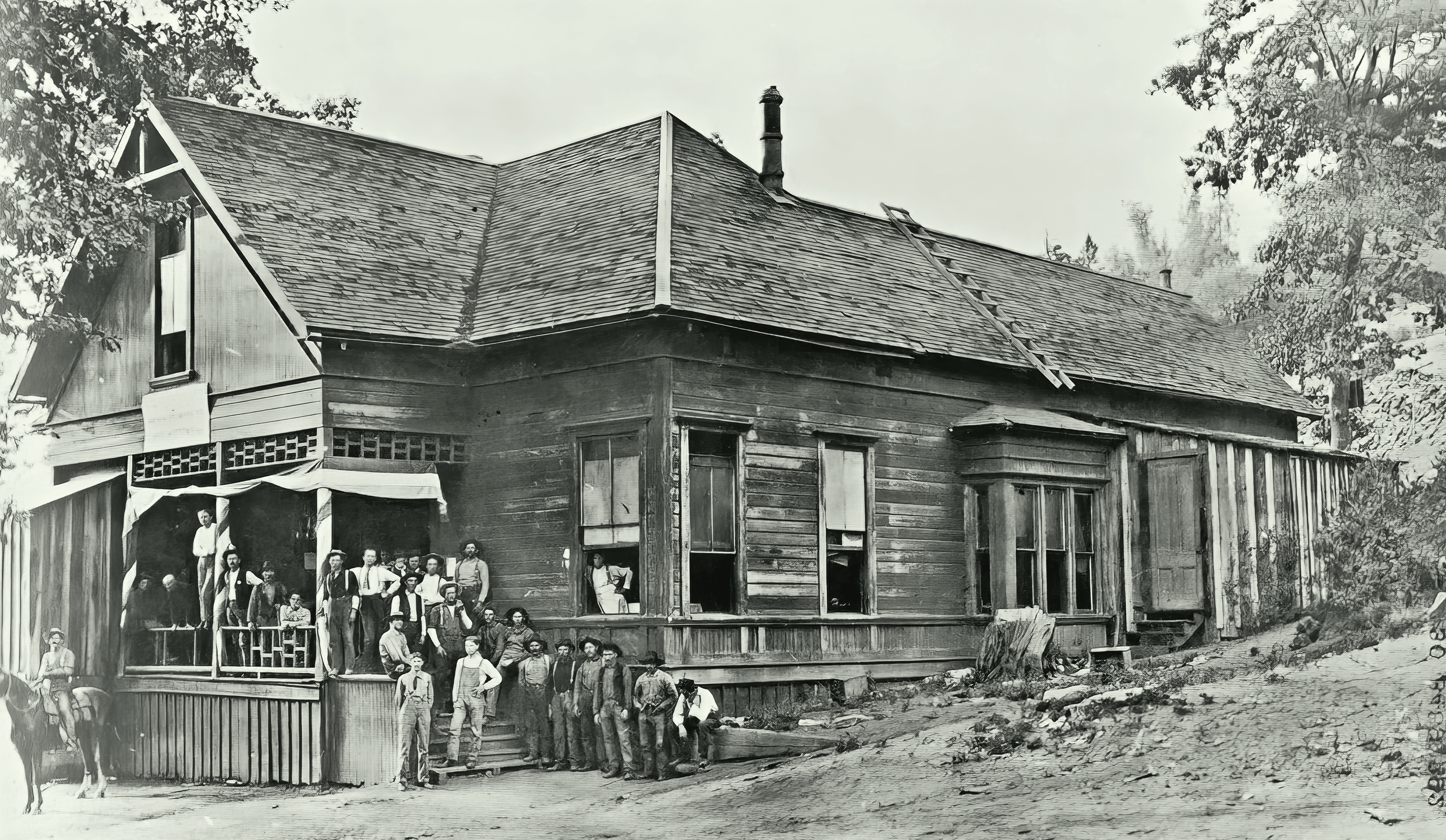
Red House Hotel
