= Fluker =

Fluker may refer to:

- Fluker, Louisiana, an unincorporated community in Tangipahoa Parish, Louisiana, United States

== People with the surname ==
- D. J. Fluker (born 1991), American football player
- Hampton Fluker (born 1990), American actor
- Mick Fluker (1926–1990), Canadian politician
- Tye'sha Fluker (born 1984), American basketball player

== See also ==
- Fluke (disambiguation)
