= Hume-Bennett Lumber Company =

Logging operation in the Sequoia National Forest

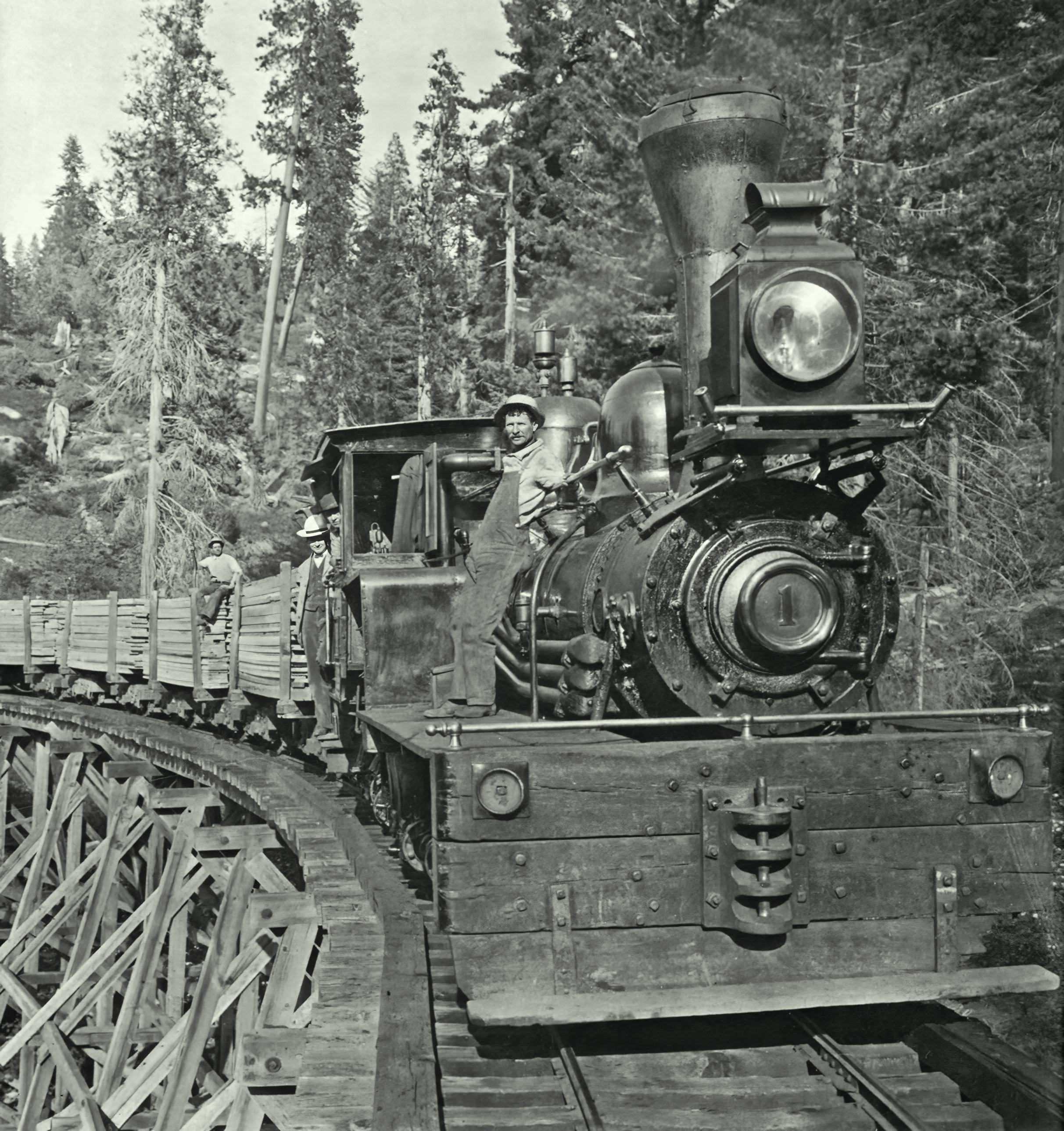
- Sanger Lumber Company's No. 1, the Sequoia, on a trestle near Converse Basin

Overview
- Locale: Sequoia National Forest
- Dates of operation: 1888–1924

Technical
- Track gauge: 3 ft (914 mm), refitted to 4 ft 8 1/2 in (1,435 mm) standard gauge in 1914
- Length: 7 mi (11 km)

The Hume-Bennett Lumber Company was an American logging operation in the Sequoia National Forest in the late 19th and early 20th centuries. The enterprise originated as the Kings River Lumber Company, was reorganized as the Sanger Lumber Company in the 1890s, became the Hume-Bennett Lumber Company after Thomas Hume and Ira B. Bennett acquired it in 1905, and returned to the Sanger Lumber Company name in 1917. Through these changes in ownership and corporate organization, the successive companies operated substantially the same timber lands, mills, railroad, and flume system extending from the southern Sierra Nevada to Sanger, California.

The company and its predecessors were known for building the world's longest log flume and the first multiple-arch hydroelectric dam. However, the company also engaged in destructive overlogging practices, cutting down 8,000 giant sequoias in Converse Basin in a decade-long event that has been described as "the greatest orgy of destructive lumbering in the history of the world."

Public opposition to the company's actions helped mobilize support for the early conservation movement, contributing to broader efforts to protect giant sequoia groves and other Sierra Nevada forests. By the 1950s, almost all surviving sequoia groves were under public protection.

The enterprise never achieved sustained profitability and ceased operations in 1924. In 1935, much of its former timberland was purchased by the federal government and incorporated into the Sequoia National Forest. It was the last major lumber operation to log giant sequoia.

== History ==
In 1878, the United States Congress passed the Timber and Stone Act to encourage private ownership of timberland and facilitate logging. The act allowed individuals to acquire federal land in the Sierra Nevada mountains for a small fee and the filing of a claim for individual 160-acre (65 ha) parcels. This facilitated the transfer of large tracts of land from the government to lumber companies, who often recruited and paid individuals to file claims on their behalf. As a result, much of the old growth forest in the region was quickly transferred to lumber companies in the late 19th century.

=== Kings River Lumber Company, 1888–1894 ===
In 1888, Hiram T. Smith and Austin D. Moore founded the Kings River Lumber Company. To accumulate their timber holdings the company recruited men who had not yet claimed their 160-acre (65 ha) of land under the Timber and Stone Act. Stagecoaches transported people between the mountains and the United States General Land Office to hurry the claim process. The deeds were then transferred for cash. The company acquired 30,000-acre (12,000 ha) of old growth sugar pine and giant sequoia in this fashion.

Smith and Moore built two mountain mills at the headwaters of the Kings River. The Millwood mill was at a higher elevation, while the Abbott Creek Mill was smaller and at a lower elevation. The Abbott Creek Mill began cutting lumber for a log flume in 1885.

To transport their lumber to market, the company needed a railroad terminus. The town of Sanger offered them 65-acre (26 ha) of land alongside the Southern Pacific. They built a planing mill, and a box, door and sash factory there. The facility turned rough-cut lumber into finished material ready for shipment.

==== The Sanger flume ====
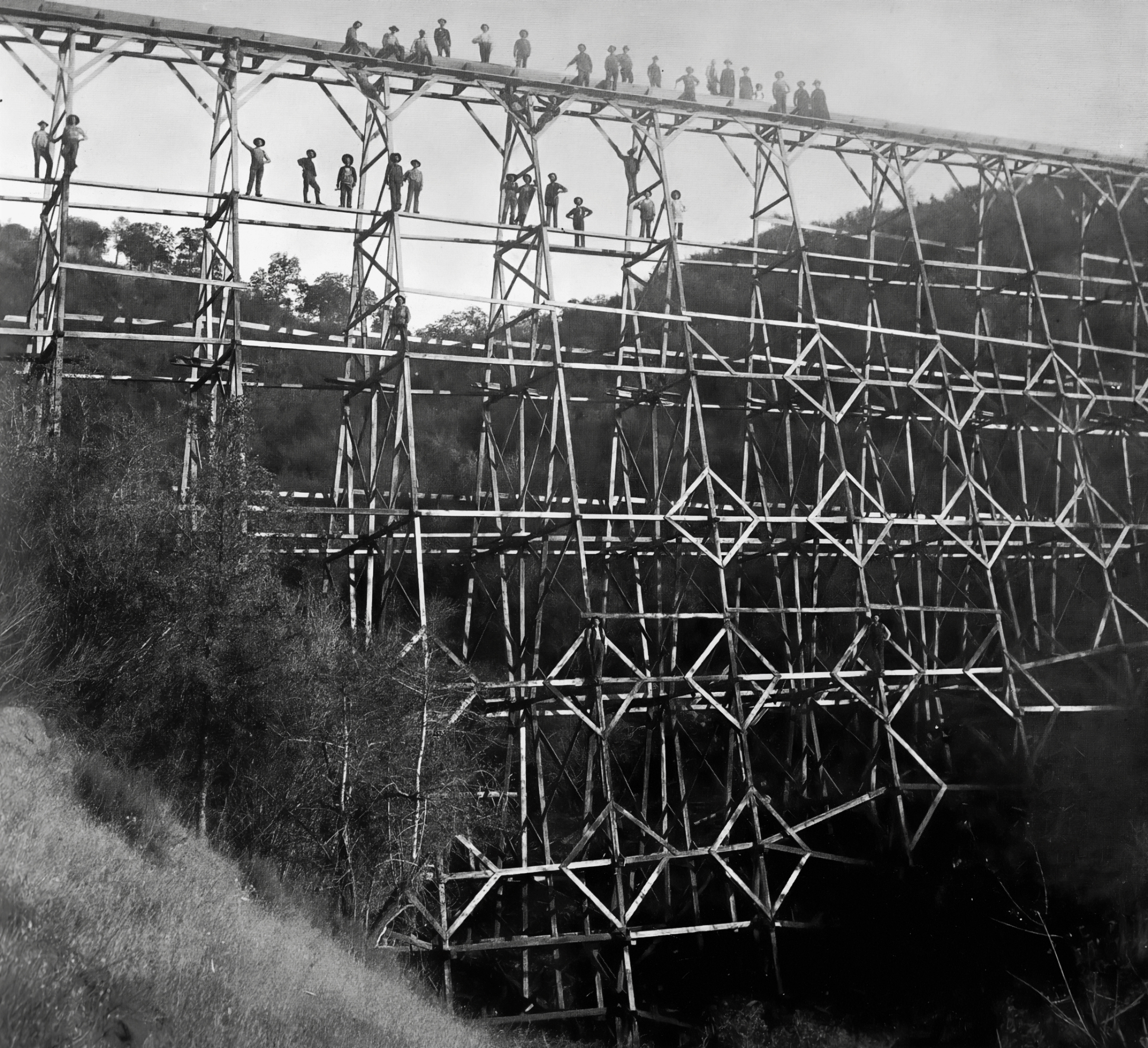
The tallest flume trestle was 300 feet (91 m) feet tall.

In 1889, the Kings River Lumber Company began construction on a 54 miles (87 km) log flume to transport lumber from mountain mills to Sanger. The flume had a drop of 4,200 feet (1,300 m) in elevation. A stone and concrete dam at Mill Flat Creek created Sequoia Lake, which served as an artificial reservoir to provide water for the flume. The lake was surrounded by the lumber town of Millwood, which became the base of operations in the woods.

The flume was a V-shaped trough built of knot-free sequoia carried by trestles of pine and cedar. By the end of 1889, the work crews had built more than 11 miles (18 km) miles of the flume, reaching the Kings River Canyon. As the flume entered the canyon, it became steeper and traveled over pre-built trestles anchored to the canyon walls. After 19 miles (31 km) miles, the flume crossed to the north side of the river using a wood-and-steel suspension bridge. The remaining 24 miles (39 km) miles of the flume followed the river into Sanger. Construction was completed on September 3, 1890.

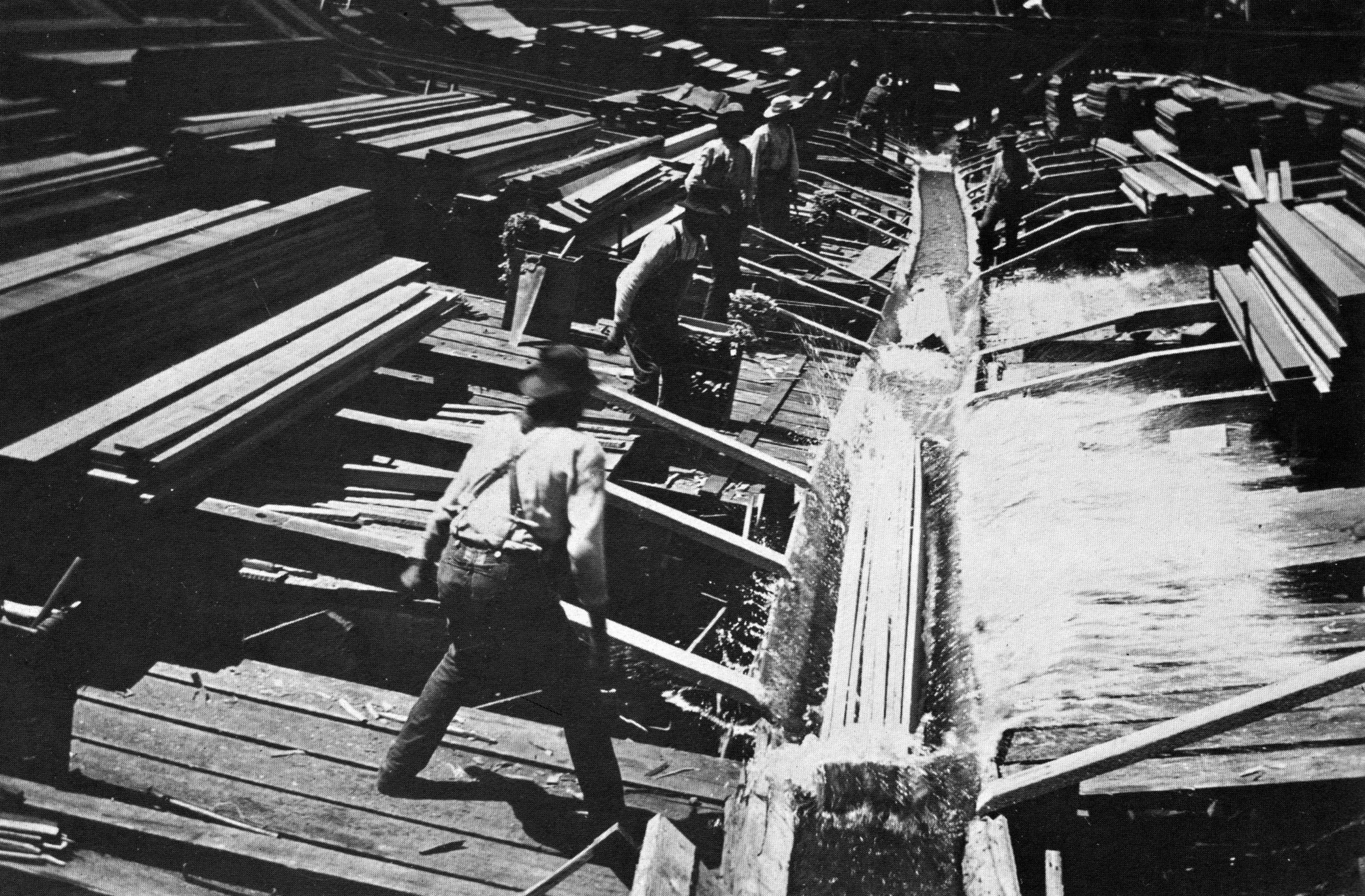
Workers load blocks of lumber into the flume.

To load the flume, sawmill workers trimmed logs into planks and clamped them into blocks. The blocks were then linked together to form trains. It took 15 hours for a train to reach the railhead at Sanger, a speed of commercial lumber transport that was unmatched at that time. Flume herders monitored the movement of the log trains and kept the flume clear of blockages, reporting any damage by telephone. The log flume was replenished by four feeder flumes along its route and had a daily capacity of 250,000 board feet, but typically shipped only 140,000 board feet.

==== Sequoia railroad ====
In 1891, the company added a narrow-gauge logging railroad to reach outlying timber. Their first locomotive, Shay No. 1 named "Sequoia", was a 36-ton narrow-gauge steam locomotive built by Lima Locomotive Works. Teams and wagons brought up the disassembled locomotive up piece-by-piece from the San Joaquin Valley. A short 2 miles (3.2 km) line extended from the lower mill that first year.

Timber production exceeded 20 million board feet for the first time in 1891. But it was not enough to cover the capital costs of the sawmill, flume and railroad. To increase output further a new 7 miles (11 km) railway was built for the 1893 season. For the first time, the Converse Basin Grove became accessible to large scale commercial logging.

==== World's Fair tree ====
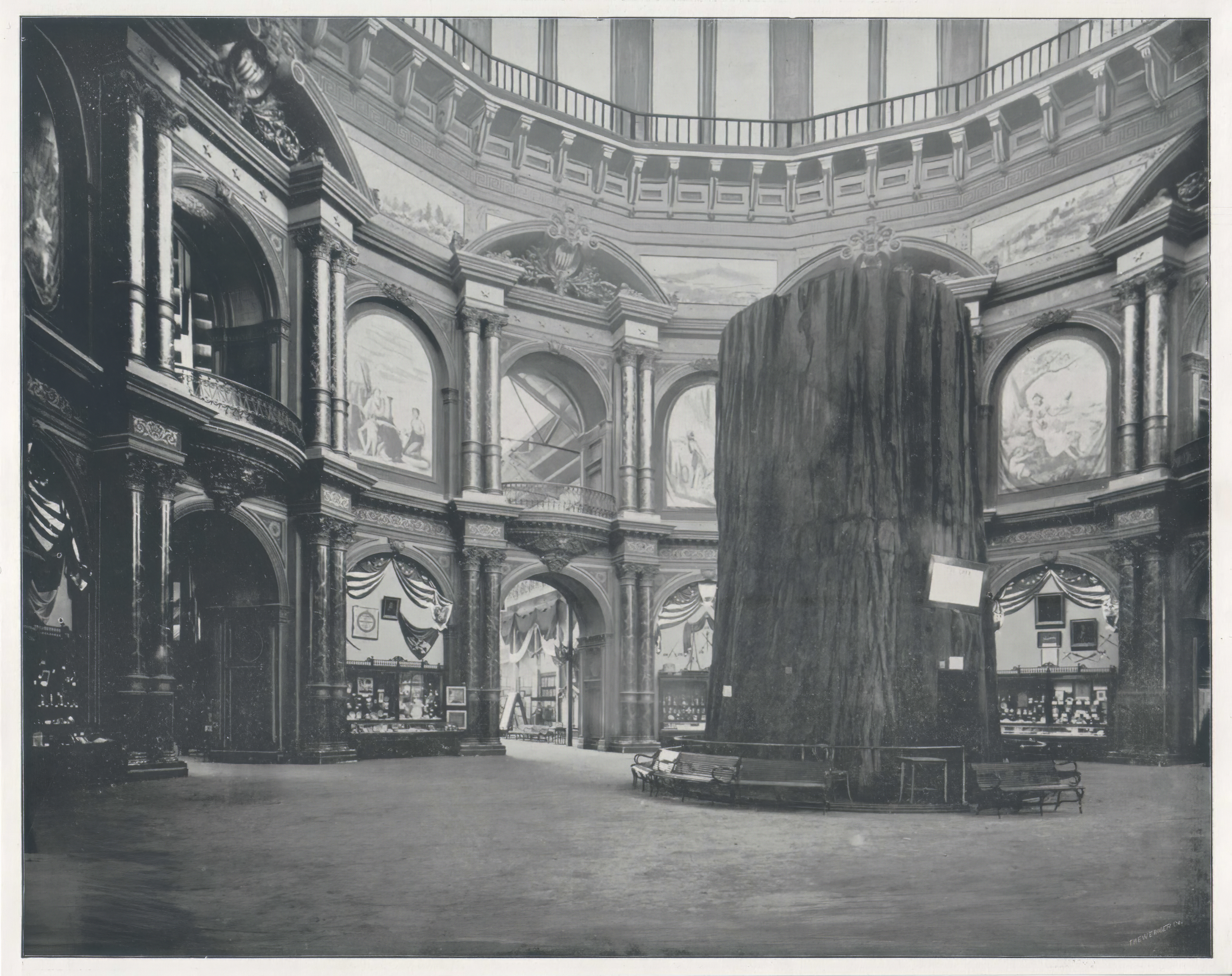
A segment of the 'General Noble' giant sequoia on display at the 1893 Chicago World's Fair

In 1893, the Kings River Lumber Company provided a giant sequoia for display at the World's Colombian Exposition in Chicago. The tree stood in the rotunda of the U.S. Government building. The intent was to create awe and drive interest in transcontinental tourism by rail. Still, some doubted the natural wonder as the "California hoax." After the exposition it became a tourist attraction in Washington D.C.

=== Sanger Lumber Company, 1894–1905 ===
The Kings River Lumber Company shipped nearly 12 million board feet of lumber in its first four months and almost 20 million in its first full year. However, the company struggled to make a profit and went bankrupt during the depression in 1882. The company was restructured as the Sanger Lumber Company in 1894 and sold stock to pay off creditors, who exchanged their liens for stock in the new company. However, the Sanger Lumber Company continued to face financial difficulties and its creditors foreclosed on the company in 1895. In 1896, the company reported a cut of 22 million board feet, but it was not enough to cover expenses.

==== Converse Basin Mill ====
To try to recover their investment, the company decided to place a sawmill in the heart of the redwood forest and log the large trees. The commercial potential of the giant sequoia was attractive to the north woods lumbermen. A single mature sequoia contained more board footage than a whole acre of white pine. With the permission of the creditors, the company kept a crew of 100 men working on the project all winter and made improvements to the hoist and incline railway. By the early spring of 1897, the company had moved the equipment from Millwood and Abbot Mills into the new Converse Basin sawmill. The new mill began operating on June 30, 1897, with a crew of 400 men and a two-band saw powered by a 1,000 horsepower steam engine. At 90 feet (27 m) feet, the sawmill used "the longest bandsaw in the world" and could halve and quarter many of the largest sequoia sections.

==== Felling the sequoia ====
Cutting down giant redwood trees was a laborious and dangerous process that required significant skill and effort. It involved building a platform above the buttress of the trunk, chopping a deep notch into the trunk with double-bitted felling axes, and then using a crosscut saw to cut through the remaining wood, with steel wedges inserted along the saw path to keep the weight of the tree from closing the cut. After a week or so of cutting, the tree was forced to fall by pounding in additional wedges until the trunk could no longer stand upright. The process was made more difficult by the extreme brittleness of the wood, which was prone to shattering upon impact. To reduce this risk, loggers often created a "felling bed" by clearing and leveling an area and cushioning it with branches and leaves to absorb some of the shock of the falling tree. When possible, sequoias were felled in the winter when deep snow could cushion the fall. Giant sequoias larger than 8 feet (2.4 m) in diameter were sectioned and then blasted apart by black powder, a process that yielded pieces that donkey engines and flatcars could move but also created enormous waste, with as much as 80% of the commercially valuable wood being wasted.

==== Logging chutes ====
The logging system in Converse Basin used a network of chutes to move timber from the woods to the mill. Built from parallel logs and supported by trestles or cribwork on steep slopes, the chutes carried logs 10 to 24 feet (3.0 to 7.3 m) long and up to 10 feet (3.0 m) in diameter. Donkey engines powered the system, while a trail rider used bell signals to communicate with the hoist operator and control the movement of the logs. The work was dangerous: logs could leave the chutes or a train could buckle, throwing timber from the line and sometimes starting fires.

The chutes and donkey engines replaced ox carts and other animal-powered methods of moving timber. The wood-burning engines consumed logging debris, undergrowth, and smaller trees for fuel, further reducing vegetation in logged areas, and contributing to deforestation.

==== Converse hoist ====
The Sanger Lumber Company built an incline hoist to transport lumber from the Converse Basin mill to the 6,700 foot summit of Hoist Ridge. The hoist lifted railroad cars loaded with lumber out of the Converse Basin and up to the summit. From there, the cable was transferred to the opposite end of the train. The lumber was then lowered down the incline on the Milwood side of the ridge to the railhead. From there, the Shay locomotive pulled the train to Millwood, where the lumber was sent down the flume to Sanger.

=== Hume-Bennett Lumber Company, 1905–1917 ===
The Hume-Bennett Lumber Company was founded in 1905 when Thomas Hume and Ira B. Bennett acquired the Sanger Lumber Company. In the same year, a fire destroyed the Converse Basin sawmill, which was rebuilt and operated for two years before logging in the area became uneconomical. As a result, the company relocated its logging operations to a new site, establishing the town of Hume, where they built a new logging complex including Hume Lake. The company also extended the Sequoia Railroad to Hume Lake, adding two Shay locomotives and building a trestle over the water to a new log dump. The flume was also extended by 17 miles, with Hume Lake serving as the new flume head, making it 73 miles long from Hume to Sanger, the longest log flume ever built. By June 1, 1910, the mill was producing nearly 100,000 feet of lumber per day.

The purchase included 22,240 acres of land in Converse Basin, of which 16,960 acres had already been logged and 5,280 acres still contained timber.

==== Hume Lake ====
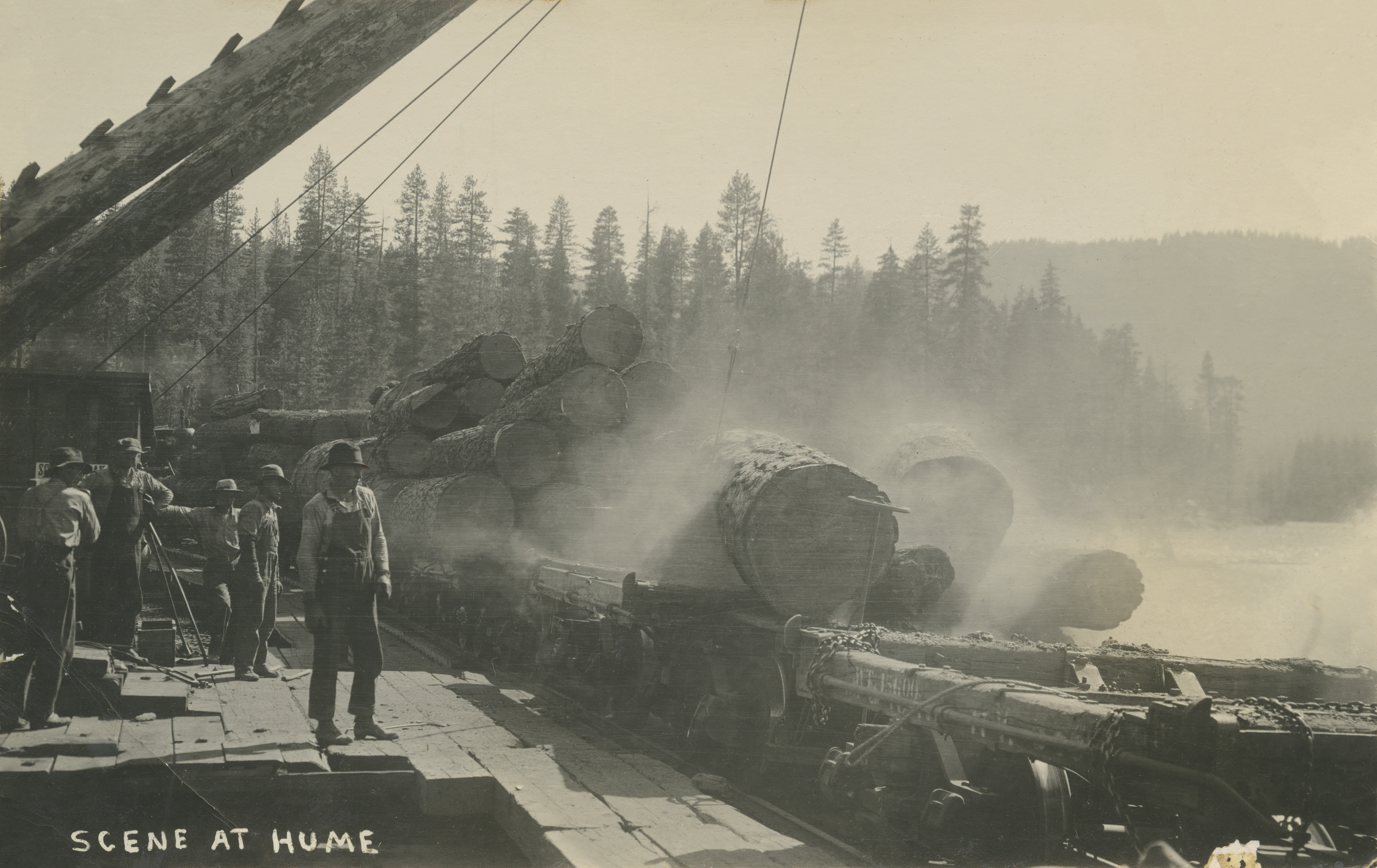
Flatcars unloading at the Hume Lake log dump, 1914

The Hume-Bennett Lumber Company hired John Samuel Eastwood to construct a dam that would create Hume Lake. Chinese American workers were hired to build the dam, which needed 2,207 cubic yards of concrete and eight miles of steel cable. The dam was finished in late November 1908 at a cost of around $35,000. When it was filled with water from Ten Mile Creek in June 1909, it created an 87-acre reservoir that served as a log dump for the mill and flume head for the flume. The 677-foot long dam, which is the first multiple arch dam ever built, still stands today.

==== Bennett's departure ====
In the fall of 1912, Bennett was bought out of his share in the company and replaced by Hume's son, George. On December 5, 1912, Bennett purchased a competitor, the Fresno Flume and Lumber Company, for nearly $950,000. However, by 1914 he was in financial trouble and left the logging industry.

During an economic recession in 1913-1914, the Hume-Bennett Lumber Company returned to logging more profitable giant sequoia trees. To accommodate these large trees, the rail lines were converted from narrow gauge to standard gauge, and 50 additional logging cars were purchased. In 1915, George Hume purchased a third Shay engine and more log cars and yarding engines, expanding the company's logging equipment to include 70 railroad cars, three locomotives, 12 steam donkeys, one McGiffert loader, and one railroad crane. The company hired 1,500 men for the 1916 season, preparing for one of its heaviest cuts on record.

=== Sanger Lumber Company, 1917–1924 ===
In February 1917, the company incorporated and changed its name back to the Sanger Lumber Company, and later to the Sanger Lumber Company of Michigan. That year, the Sierra region was impacted by World War I, which led to a 40% reduction in the workforce and difficulties obtaining supplies and equipment. The Hume Mill was also destroyed by a fire, causing significant damages. The Sanger Lumber Company struggled financially and eventually closed in 1924 due to losses.

== Labor conditions ==
Logging was difficult, dangerous and intermittent work with few safety regulations and no form of workmen's compensation until 1913. Loggers worked 11 hours a day, six days a week, from April to November, earning $1.50 to $2.50 per day, less room and board. Injury and death were common occurrences in all aspects of the logging operation due to the dangers of steel cables, mill machinery, and flume trestles. A private company hospital treated injuries, but treatment was sometimes inadequate. Accounts of injuries were common in newspapers and courtroom filings, including:

- In 1894, fifteen-year-old Fred Jones received medical treatment from a man who claimed to be a doctor but was not. Improper treatment resulted in the loss of his hand.
- On June 13, 1914, C. M. Mooney was injured by debris from an explosion intended uproot a tree. The company was ordered to pay disability of $104.67.
- On October 20, 1914, Orlando V. Carter a night watchman fell to his death through an opening in a machine room. The company was ordered to pay a death benefit to the widow of $2,490.

== Legacy ==
=== Federal acquisition ===
In 1926, a forest fire destroyed 7 miles of the log flume and in 1927 George Hume sold some of the company's assets. On April 8, 1935, he sold the remainder the company, including the dam and 20,000 acres of land, to the U.S. National Forest Service. The U.S. National Forest Service has incorporated the land into the Sequoia National Forest.

=== Hume Lake Christian Camps ===
On January 9, 1946, 320 acres of land adjacent to Hume Lake was sold for $140,000 to Walter Warkentin and partners. The sale included the Hume Lake Hotel, store, service station, post office, 22 cottages, 22 boats, a saloon and a brothel. The land was converted into Hume Lake Christian Camps and serves as a summer camp and conference center for worship and religious studies.

=== Habitat recovery ===
The forest has not recovered over a century after it was overlogged. Efforts to restore the forest by planting single-species conifer plantations (forests made up of only one type of tree) have been unsuccessful and have actually caused more harm. These plantations are prone to pests and have disrupted the local water cycle, resulting in an increase in dead trees and dense fuel loads that increase the risk of wildfire and loss of old-growth forest habitat for giant sequoias. In 2021, the United States Forest Service recommended habitat restoration in Hume Basin to reduce fuels and restore habitat in the Tenmile Creek drainage through various methods, including "thinning, sanitation, mastication, and prescribed burning." After more than 100 years of fire exclusion (actively suppressing fires), controlled burning began in the Redwood Mountain and Big Stump giant sequoia groves in February 2022.

== Locomotive roster ==
Road Number	Builder	Engine Type	Wheel Size	Date	Shop number	Weight	Boiler Pressure	Tractive Effort in Pounds	Notes
1	Lima	2T Shay	28	1891	350	60,000 lb (27,000 kg)	160	14,450	"Sequoia" purchased new by Kings River Lumber Company. Converted to standard gauge in 1914. Sold to E.M. Prescott, Fresno, California 1929. Scrapped.
2	Lima	2T Shay	29	1911	2411	65,000 lb (29,000 kg)	160	14,450	Purchased new. Converted to standard gauge 1914. Sold to E.M. Prescott, Fresno, California, 1929. Boiler used by Byles-Jamison Lumber Company, Fresno, California, 1931–35, then Valley Paving Company, Fresno, California. Scrapped totally after 1945.
3	Lima	2T Shay	29	1916	2848	65,000 lb (29,000 kg)	160	14,450	Purchased new (standard gauge). Sold E.M. Prescott, Fresno, California, 1929. Disposition unknown. May have run in the Philippines.

== Bibliography ==
- Bryant, Ralph Clement (1913). Logging: The Principles and General Methods of Operation in the United States (First ed.). New York: Wiley and Sons.
- Fry, Walter; White, John R. (1930). Big Trees. Palo Alto, California: Stanford University Press.
- Hartesveldt, Richard J.; Harvey, H. Thomas; Shellhammer, Howard S.; Ronald E., Stecker (1975). The Giant Sequoia of the Sierra Nevada (PDF). Washington, D.C.: U.S. Department of the Interior, National Park Service.
- Johnston, Hank (1997). The Whistles Blow No More (Fifth ed.). Stauffer Publishing. ISBN 0-87046-067-6.
- Johnston, Hank (2003). They Felled the Redwoods (Thirteenth ed.). Stauffer Publishing. ISBN 0-87046-003-X.
- McGee, Lizzie. Mills of the Sequoias, Visalia, California, Tulare County Historical Society, Historical Bulletin, March 1952
