= John Gurley Flook =

American politician

John G. Flook (1839–1926) was instrumental in locating Oregon's land-grant university in the town of Corvallis in 1869.

John Gurley Flook (1839–1926) was an American farmer, politician, and businessman. Flook is best remembered as a member of the Oregon State Legislature who sponsored the bill establishing Oregon Agricultural College in Corvallis, Oregon — today's Oregon State University.

== Biography ==
=== Early years ===
John Gurley Flook was born August 12, 1839, in Clermont County, Ohio. Flook's father, John Flook, Sr., was an immigrant born in Baden, then a sovereign country which joined the German empire only in 1871. His mother, the former Sarah Durough, was the daughter of an Ohio pioneer with family lineage dating back to the Virginia colony.

Flook's parents moved to the Midwestern state of Iowa in 1842, where they established themselves as farmers near the town of Farmington. The family moved west to Chico, California, in 1857, coming west in three covered wagons, one of which was driven by the second-eldest son, John.

The family moved north to Douglas County, Oregon, in 1860 to take up farming and the raising of livestock there. John, Jr. finally left home in 1864, enlisting in Company A of the 1st Oregon Cavalry, mustered in Roseburg. He served time at various bases in the region, mustering out of the service in July 1866 as a first corporal.

=== Political career ===
In 1868, while still a resident of Douglas County, Flook was elected to the Oregon State Legislature as a Republican. He would only serve for a single two-year term in that office, but during that time he managed to make his mark as the author of the so-called "Flook bill," which established a state-owned land-grant agricultural college at Corvallis, now known as Oregon State University.

Flook's legislation did not create a university in Corvallis from thin air. As early as 1851 the legislature of the Oregon Territory passed a bill establishing a territorial university in the town of Marysville, a small enclave in the Willamette Valley renamed Corvallis in December 1853. It was not until 1856 that the Corvallis Academy — the first post-secondary school in the area — was established, however. This school was incorporated and rechristened as Corvallis College in 1858. The school went bankrupt and was purchased by representatives of the Southern Methodist Church, which relaunched Corvallis College under church auspices in 1860.

Congressional legislation was signed into law in 1862 providing for the granting of 90,000 acres of federal land to the state of Oregon for the establishment of a state agricultural college. Flook learned that the time to take advantage of this land grant was soon to expire and introduced legislation providing for the establishment of such a school in Corvallis. In August 1868, aided by the effort of W. W. Moreland of the Corvallis College faculty, new articles of incorporation were filed and Corvallis College was formally "designated and adopted" as the recipient of the federal land grant. The Agricultural College of Oregon became known as Oregon State College in 1937, and subsequently Oregon State University in 1961.

=== Later years ===
After his stint in the military, Flook returned home to the family farm in Douglas County. He left farming in 1873 to establish a flour mill in Roseburg as J.G. Flook Company, gradually modernizing his facility and expanding capacity to 75 barrels per day. About 15 people were employed in his milling operation.

Flook then sold his flour mill and used the funds to launch a planing mill in Roseburg, also known as the J.G. Flook Company.

During his life Flook married twice, siring two daughters prior to his first wife's death. Flook's second marriage took place in April 1893. The couple had no children.

Flook was a member of the First Christian Church of Roseburg, serving on that institution's board of trustees and as superintendent of its Sunday school. Flook was also instrumental in the construction of a new high school for Roseburg, serving as head of a committee which obtained a building site and plans and which solicited bids for construction.

=== Death and legacy ===
John G. Flook died January 24, 1926, at his home in Corvallis. He was buried in a cemetery located in his former home town of Roseburg. He was 86 years old at the time of his death.
