= Fluke =

Fluke may refer to:

== Biology ==
- Fluke (fish), a species of marine flatfish
- Fluke (tail), either of the two lobes of the tail of a cetacean, such as dolphins, whales, and porpoises
- Fluke (flatworm), parasitic flatworms in the class Trematoda
  - Blood fluke
  - Liver fluke

== Arts and entertainment ==
- Fluke (album), a 1995 album by Canadian rock band Rusty
- Fluke (band), a British electronic dance music group
- Fluke (film), a 1995 film directed by Carlo Carlei
- Fluke (General Hospital), a character in the American television series General Hospital
- Fluke (novel), a 1977 novel by English horror writer James Herbert
- Fluke, or, I Know Why the Winged Whale Sings, a 2003 novel by Christopher Moore
- Fluke Mini-Comics & Zine Festival, a one-day mini-comics, small press, and 'zine festival held annually in Athens, Georgia

== People ==
- Emily Fluke (born 1992), American ice hockey player
- Joanne Fluke (born c. 1943), American author from Minnesota
- John Fluke (1911–1984), American engineer, Founder & CEO of Fluke Corporation
- Louise Fluke (1900–1986), designer of the Flag of Oklahoma
- Sandra Fluke (born 1981), attorney, feminist, LGBTQ activist
- Gawin Caskey (born 1997), Thai actor, nicknamed Fluke
- Natouch Siripongthon (born 1996), Thai actor, nicknamed Fluke

== Other uses ==
- Fluke (anchor), blades at the end of an anchor
- Fluke (cue sports), an unintentionally fortuitous shot in cue sports such as snooker
- Fluke Corporation, a manufacturer of electrical and electronic test equipment
- Fluke Ridge, Aristotle Mountains, Graham Land, Antarctica
- Snow fluke, an anchoring device for climbing and camping

== See also ==
- Coincidence
- Flook (disambiguation)
- Fluker (disambiguation)
- One-off (disambiguation)
