= Flook (app) =

Location-based browsing application

Flook was a location-based browsing application and website developed by Ambient Industries located in the United Kingdom, initially for the iPhone. Users of the application created virtual cards, or "Flooks", which were made up of a photo of a particular location and a small piece of text describing that location. These Flooks were then recorded with their geographic coordinates so that other Flook users could see where they have been posted when they are using the app. Users typically upload local secrets, places to go and things to see. The application was therefore a wiki of sorts, but was also a combination of Google Maps, StumbleUpon and review websites such as Tripadvisor or Toptable.

Ambient Industries was founded by two former Symbian programmers, Roger Nolan and Jane Sales, who assisted in the construction of much of the Symbian mobile operating system, together with Tristan Brotherton, formerly of Synapsim, Roo and Fluidjuice, and who assisted in the creation of screening software that is now used by Kroll. Flook was launched in December 2009. Ambient Industries had received funding from UK tech investment houses Eden Ventures and Amadeus Capital Partners.

In February 2010, Flook won the Mobile Premier Award in User Experience awarded by Mobile User Experience.

In June 2010, Ambient Industries partnered with Geocast to make flook cards from Geocast's local offers.

According to the email sent to their users, Flook ceased service after 25 February 2012, and its official website is no longer available.
