= Log flume =

Type of flume used to float logs to a sawmill

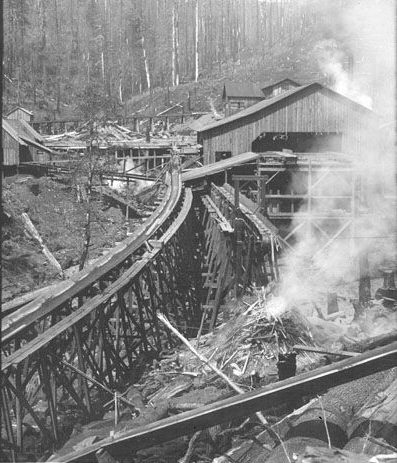
A sawmill with log flume, Cascade Range, USA

A log flume or lumber flume is a watertight flume constructed to transport lumber and logs down mountainous terrain using flowing water. Flumes replaced horse- or oxen-drawn carriages on dangerous mountain trails in the late 19th century. Logging operations preferred flumes whenever a reliable source of water was available. Flumes were cheaper to build and operate than logging railroads. They could span long distances across chasms with more lightweight trestles.

Flumes remained in widespread use through the early 20th century. The logging truck replaced both the logging railroad and the flume after WWII. Today, log flumes remain in the popular imagination as amusement park rides.

== History ==
J. W. Haines built the first successful lumber flume in 1859. The v-shaped trough brought a half-million feet of lumber daily from the eastern Sierra Nevada to the Comstock Lode. The 15 miles (24 km) route was between Lake Tahoe and Reno, terminating at the Virginia and Truckee Railroad terminus in Washoe Valley. Soon, log flumes spread across the mountains of the western United States as artificial rivers that brought lumber to market.

== Flume heads ==
Log flumes need a steady supply of water. Often, a log pond or artificial reservoir serves this purpose. The head directs the flow of water into the top of the flume. Flume boxes are built tight with lumber free of knots to prevent leaks. Feeder troughs resupply water on long routes.

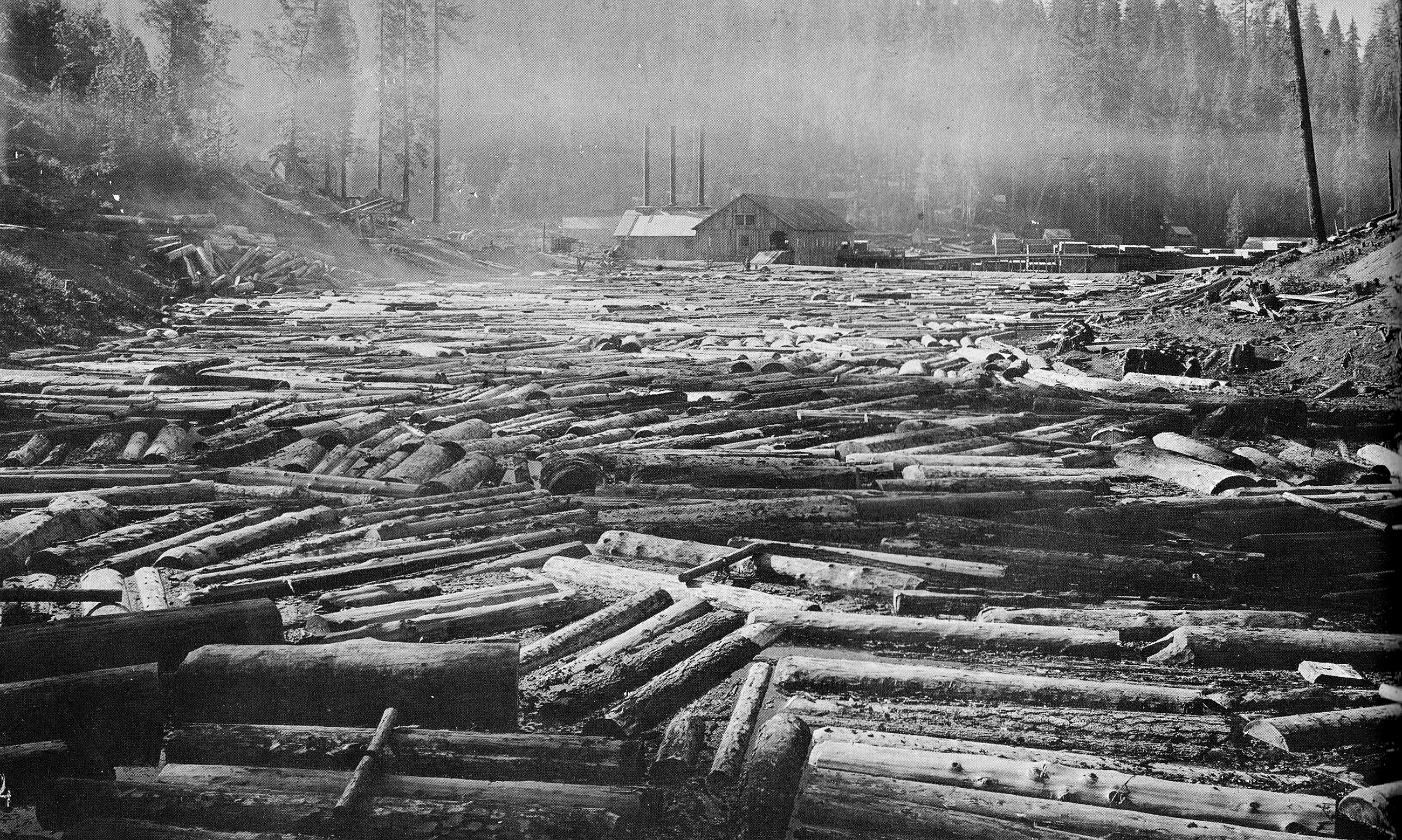
The log pond at Sugar Pine provided the water supply for the flume head.

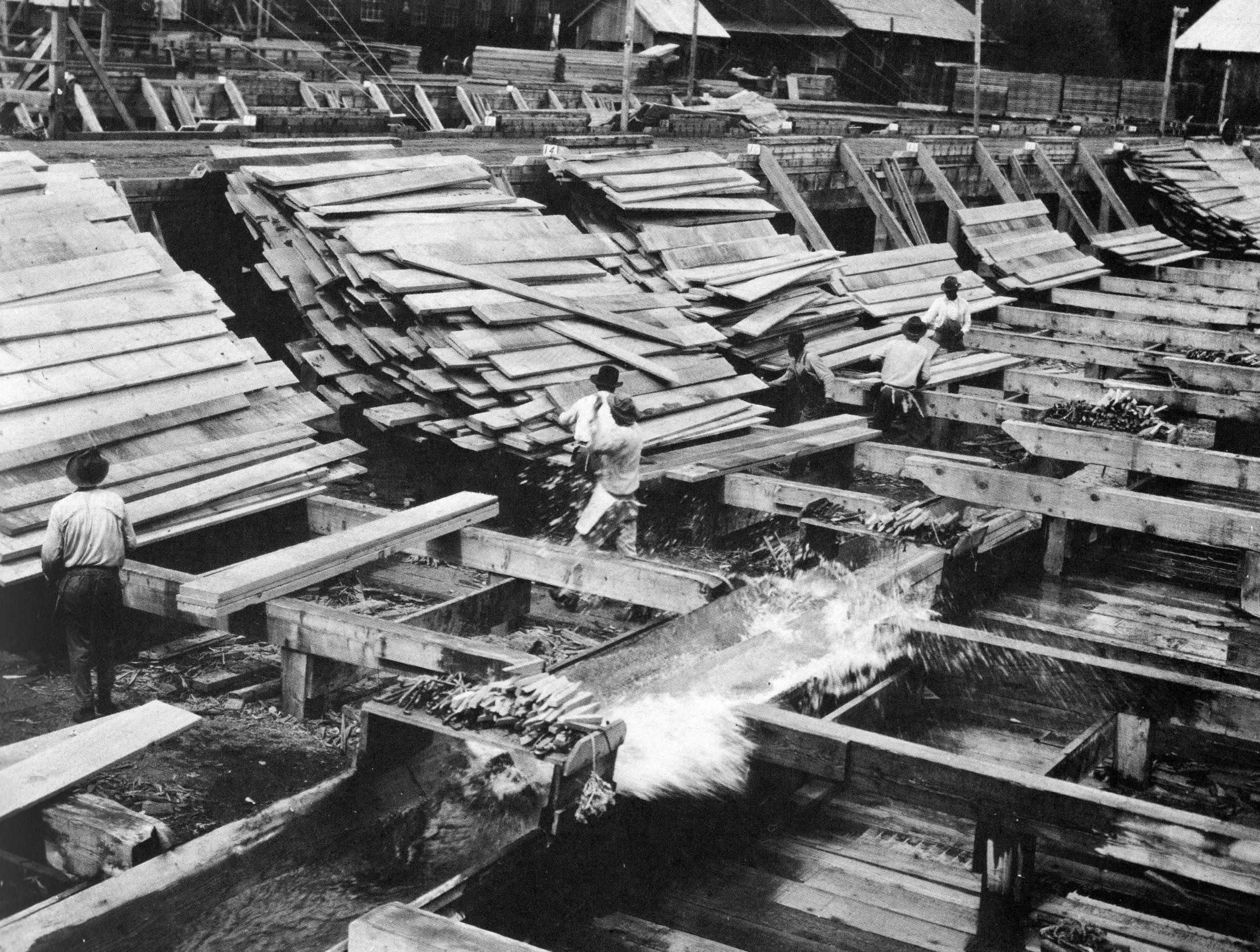
Workers load bundles of lumber for the trip down the flume.

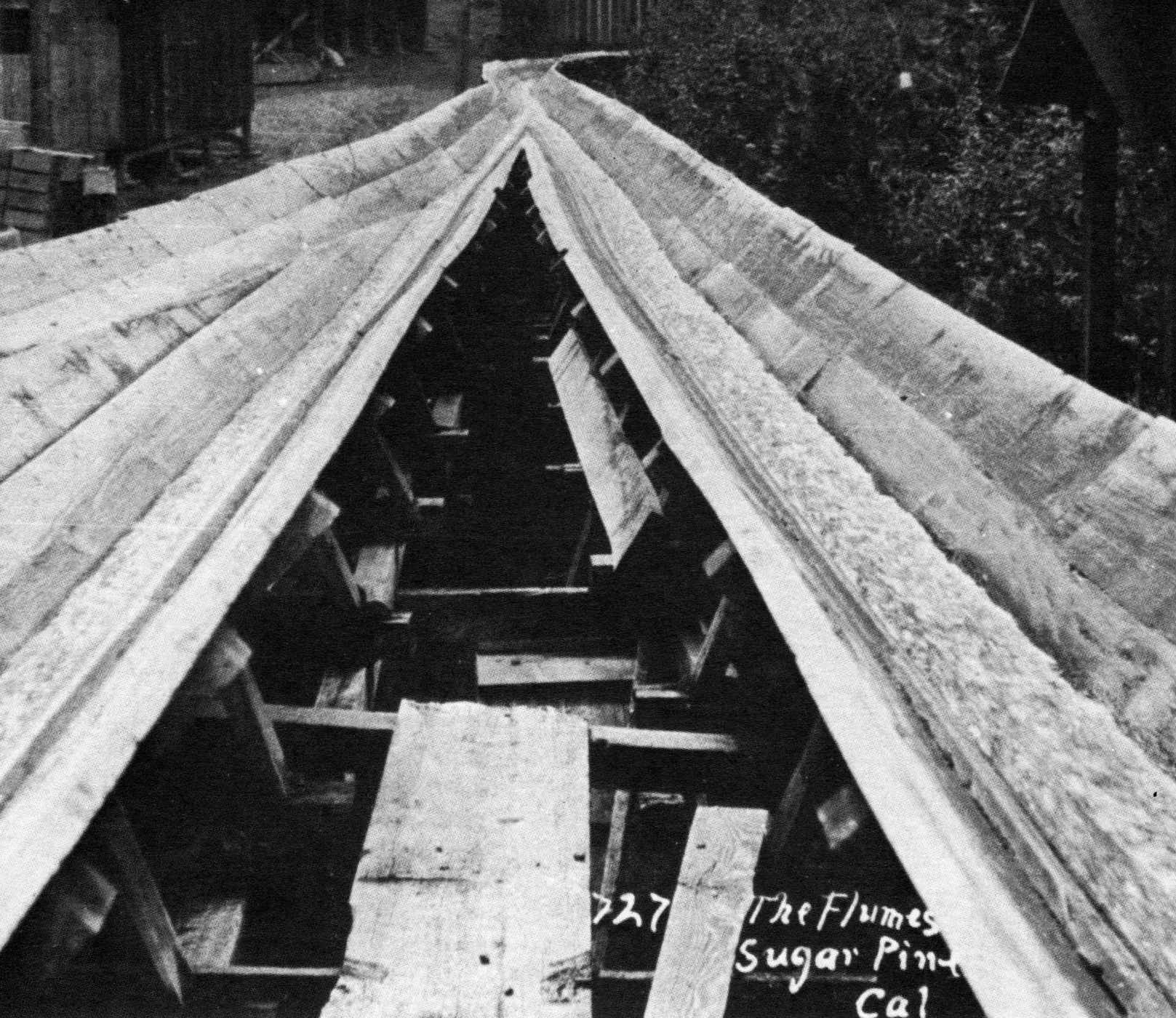
A "flume frog" joins multiple branches into one trunk as it leaves the sawmill's loading deck.

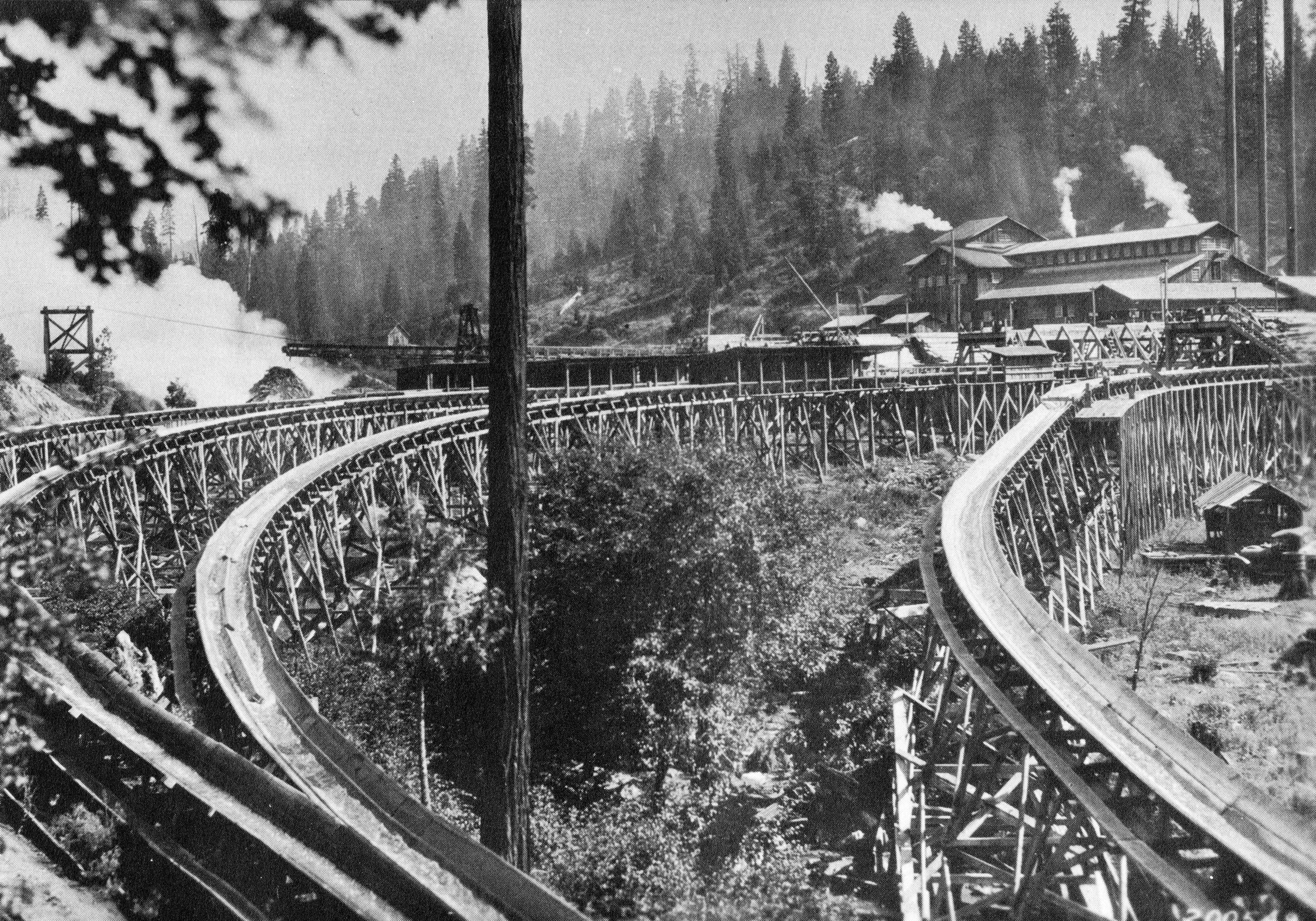
Multiple flume branches leaving the sawmill at Sugar Pine.

Logging flumes were only needed in semi-arid regions without rivers or navigable streams. As a result, water rights were often difficult to secure. Often, flumes moved water from one drainage basin to another, with rights settled in court.

== Flume construction ==
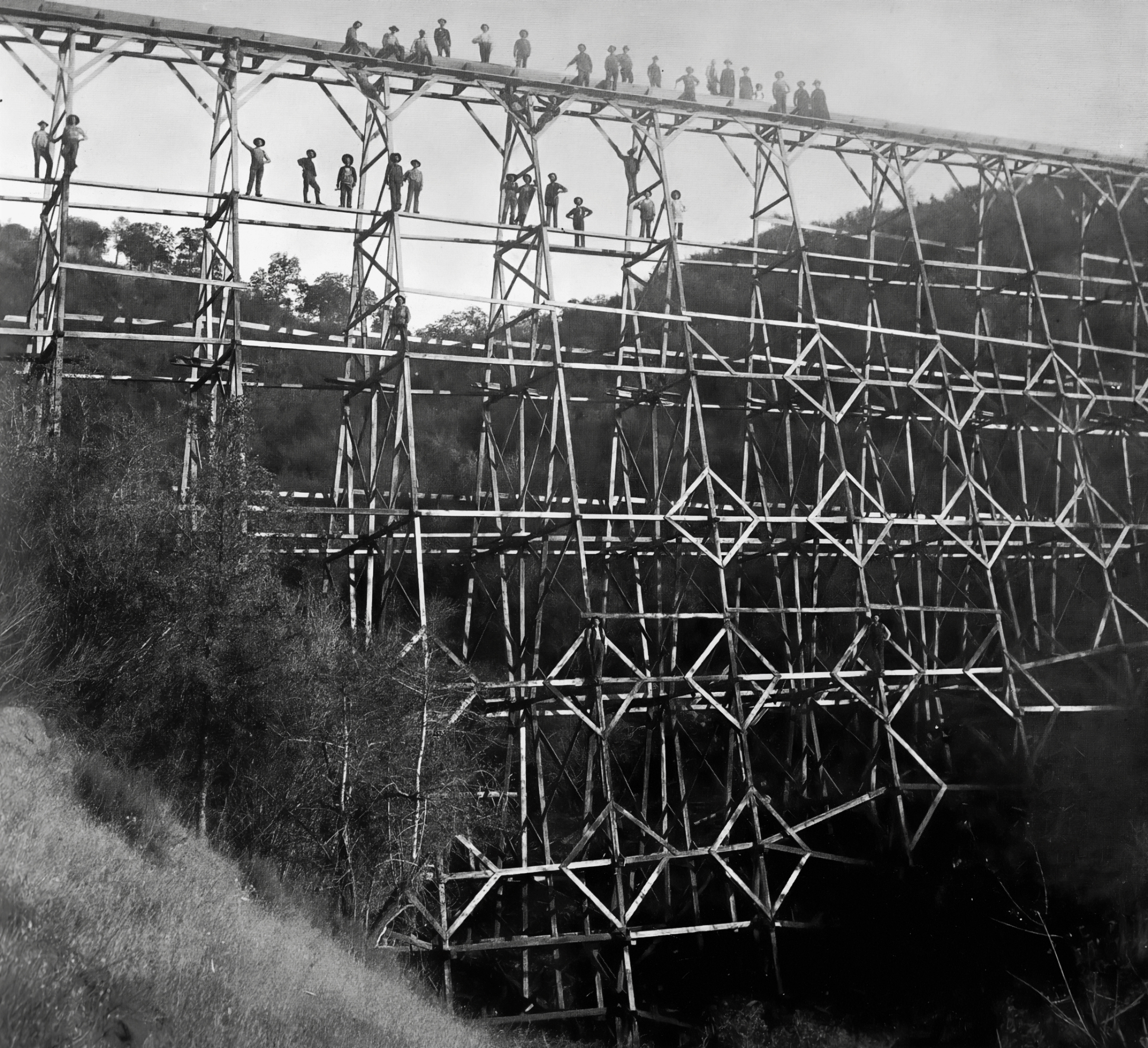
The high trestle on the Sanger Flume was over 300 feet (91 m) tall.

Flume routes were surveyed by engineers using the same methods as a railroad survey. However, flumes had several advantages to logging railroads in steep terrain. They could span gulches using much lighter trestles and they took up less space, fitting inside narrower canyons where there wasn’t room for a railroad. The main disadvantage of the light construction was they were damaged more easily by fire, floods, wind, and falling timber. But they could be repaired more cheaply.

Flume sites were mostly in rough, undeveloped wilderness. Unlike railroad construction, this required lumber and supplies to be carried in by hand. Flume boxes and trestles were built onsite. Construction crews included six to eight workers. On trestles, four worked aloft continuously. One low man handled and sent up the lumber.

Working on the flume was a dangerous job. Occupational fatality statistics are unavailable. But reports suggest that falls resulted in many injuries and deaths.

Square lumber was often provided by a temporary, portable sawmill erected at the head of the flume. Other times, round timber trestles of 8 inches (20 cm) to 12 inches (30 cm) diameter were cut and finished from along the route.

Some trestles achieved staggering heights to maintain a desirable grade. Three percent was ideal for a straight flume. Sometimes grades of up to 75 percent were used on short stretches. The steeper the grade the more gradual the curves had to be, or else lumber would jam or go over the sides. The maximum curve was 8 degrees.

=== Box flumes ===
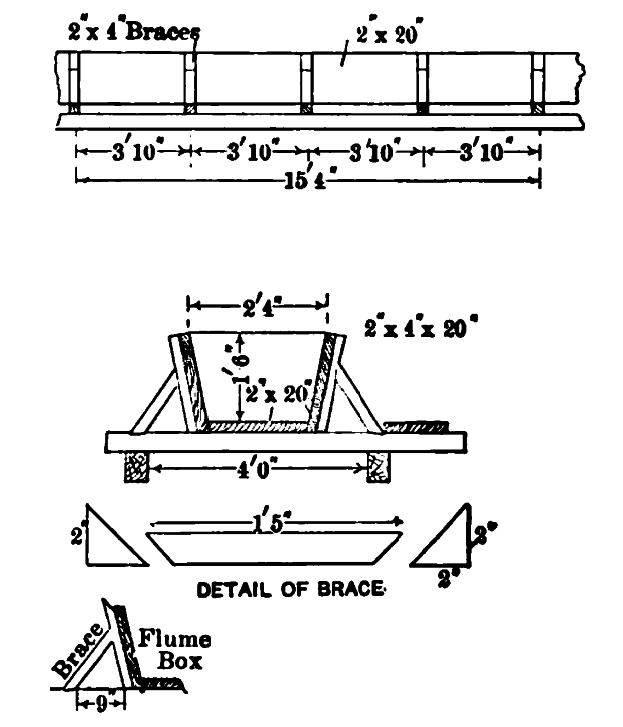
Flume box cross section.

Early logging flumes were square wooden chutes known as box flumes. These were prone to jams that could cause damage and required constant maintenance. They were also costly to build. A square box carries much more water compared to a V-shaped flume. The greater weight of the water required a sturdier structure, especially heavier trestles.

=== V-flumes ===
In 1867, James W. Haines first built the V-shaped log flumes that allowed a jammed log to free itself as the rising water level in the flume pushed it up. These efficient flumes consisted of two boards, 2 feet (0.61 m) wide and 16 feet (4.9 m) feet long, joined perpendicularly, and came in common use in the western United States during the late 19th century.

Box flumes were not made obsolete. They continued to be built when a large volume of water was desired for a secondary use, such as irrigation. Box flumes were also more capable of handling materials uneven in size and weight simultaneously. Lumber, pulpwood, shingle bolts, and whole logs move at different speeds and were prone to double-up in a V-flume’s low grades and curves. Finally, box flumes could move an unprecedented amount of material, up to a maximum capacity of 300,000 board feet (710 m^{3}), or three times as great as the maximum for a V-flume.

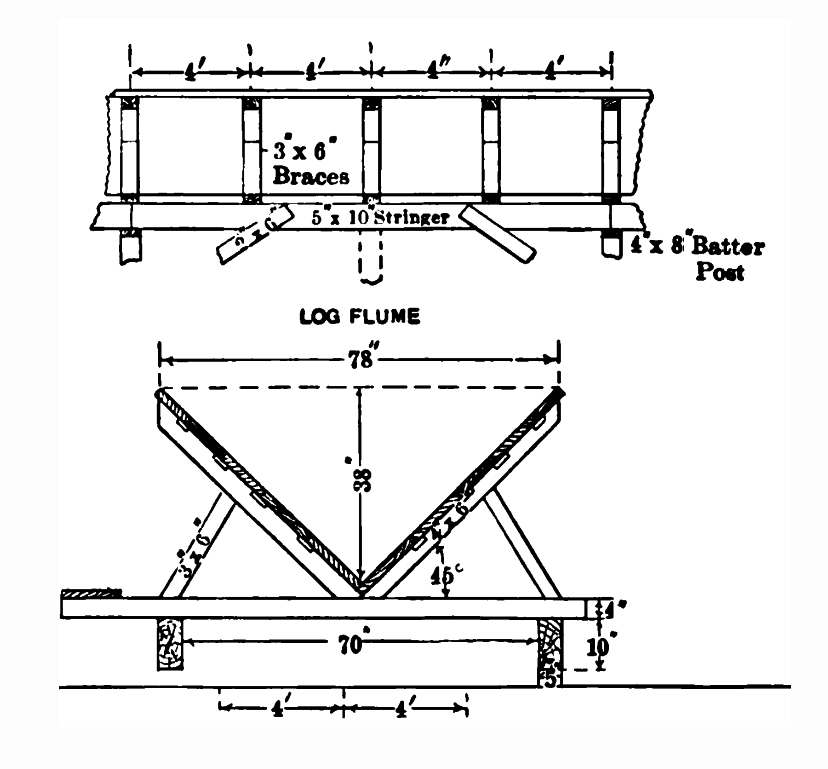
V-Box flume cross-section for large logs.

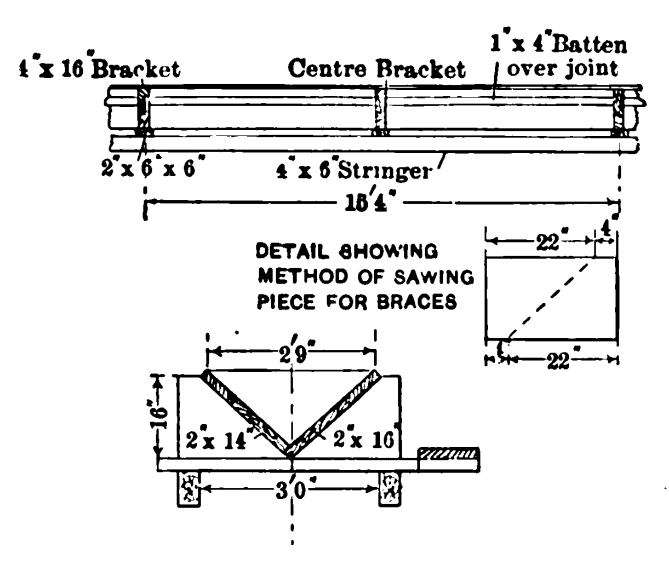
V-Box flume cross-section for lumber.

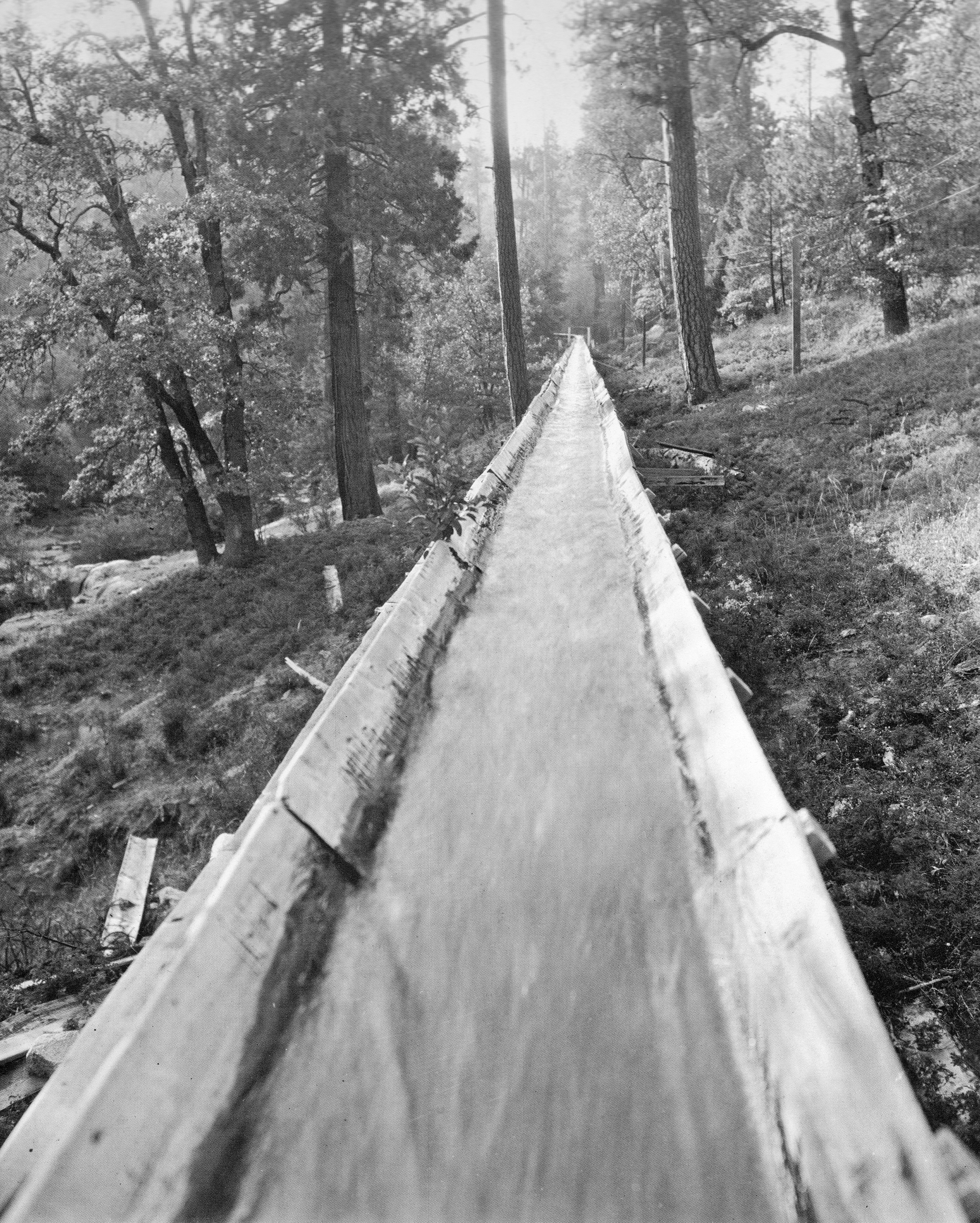
Water flowing down a V-flume near Sugar Pine, California.

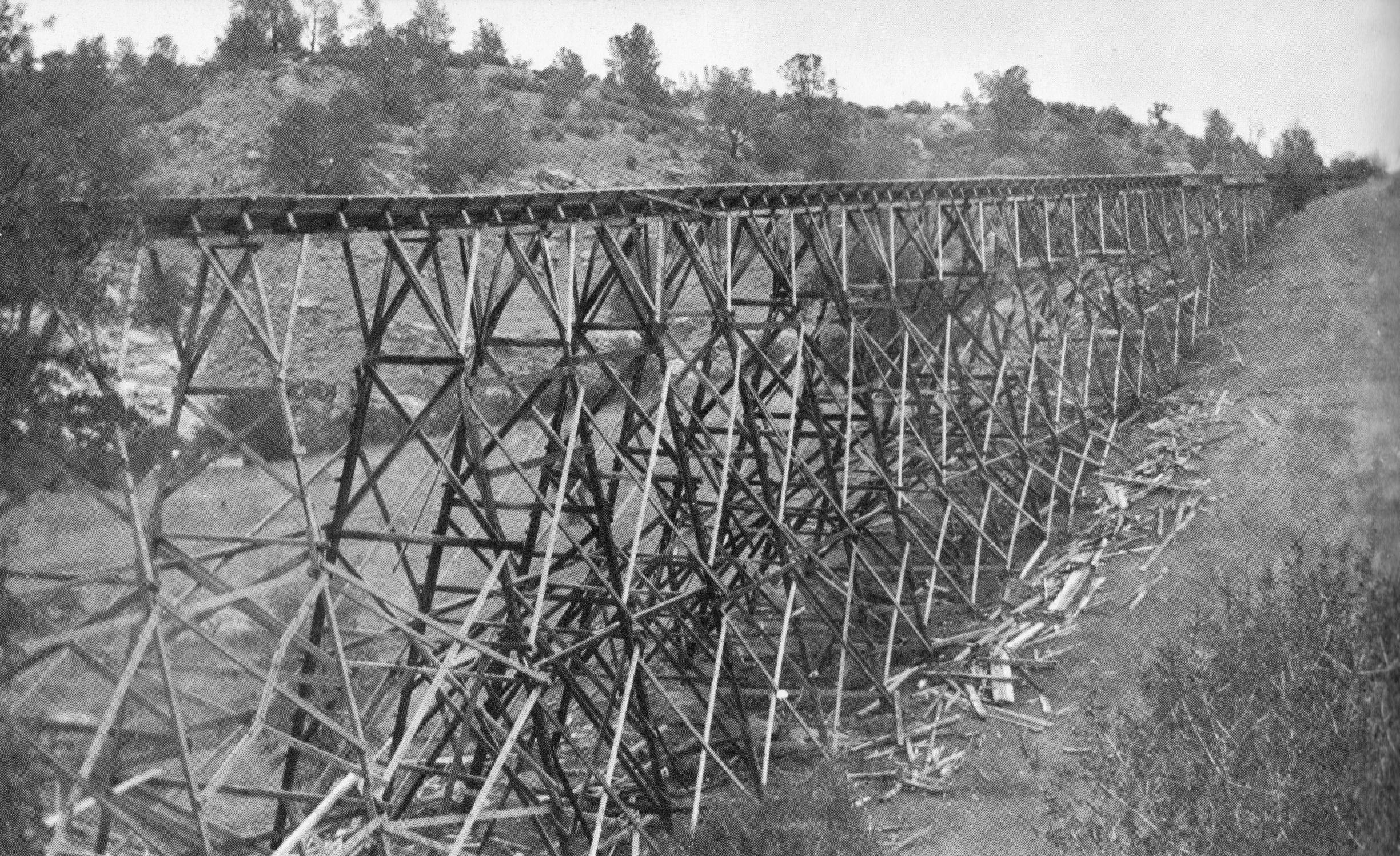
A tall V-flume trestle around 1900.

== Flume herders ==
Proper operation was ensured by "flume herders" who at various locations along the flume checked the flow of lumber and water. On longer flumes, flume herders lived in permanent flume houses along the route. Light signals, and later telephone lines, enabled communication up and down the line.

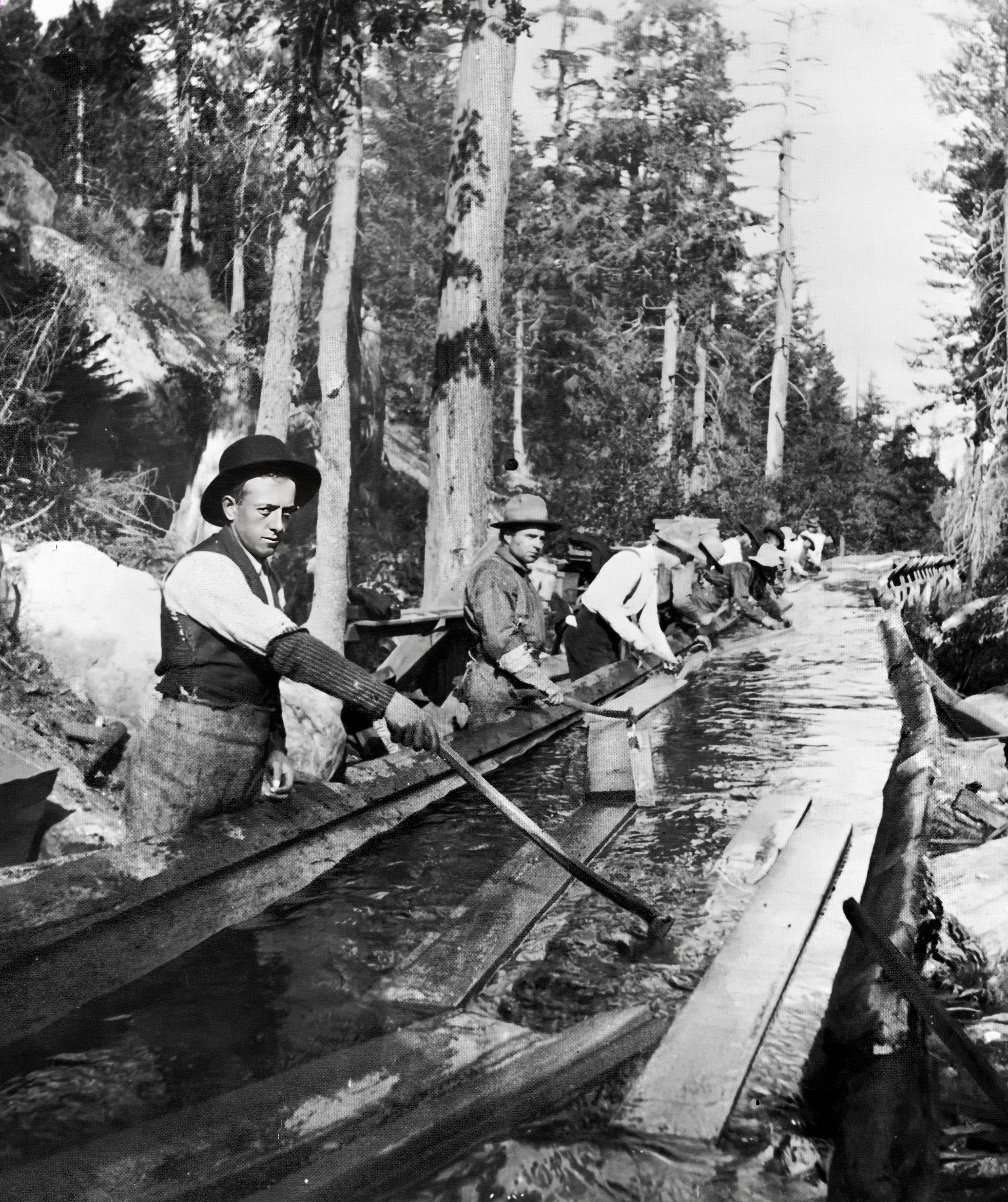
Flume herders used a metal-tipped wood handling tool called a pickaroon.

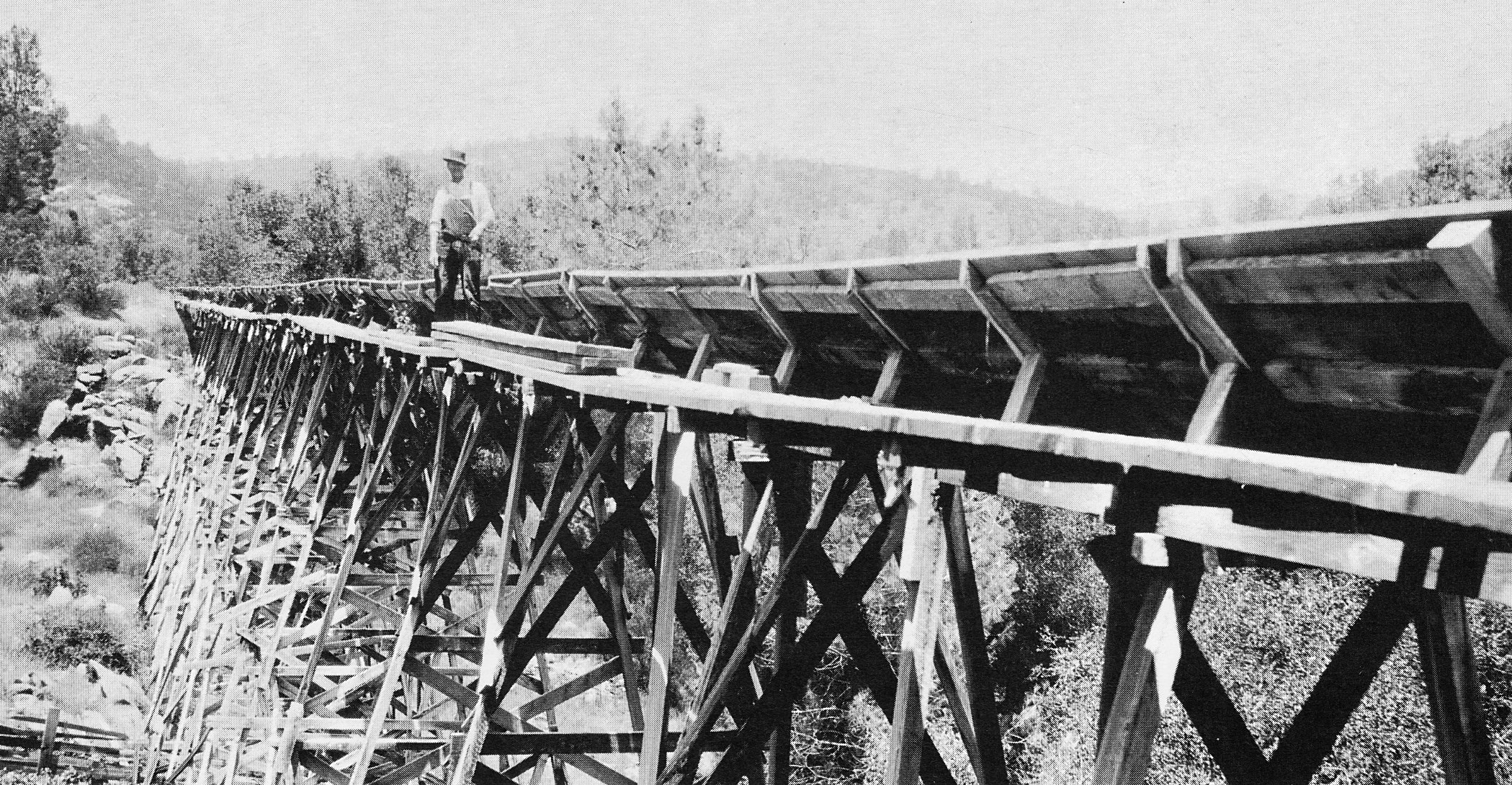
Narrow catwalks provide maintenance access along the length of the flume.

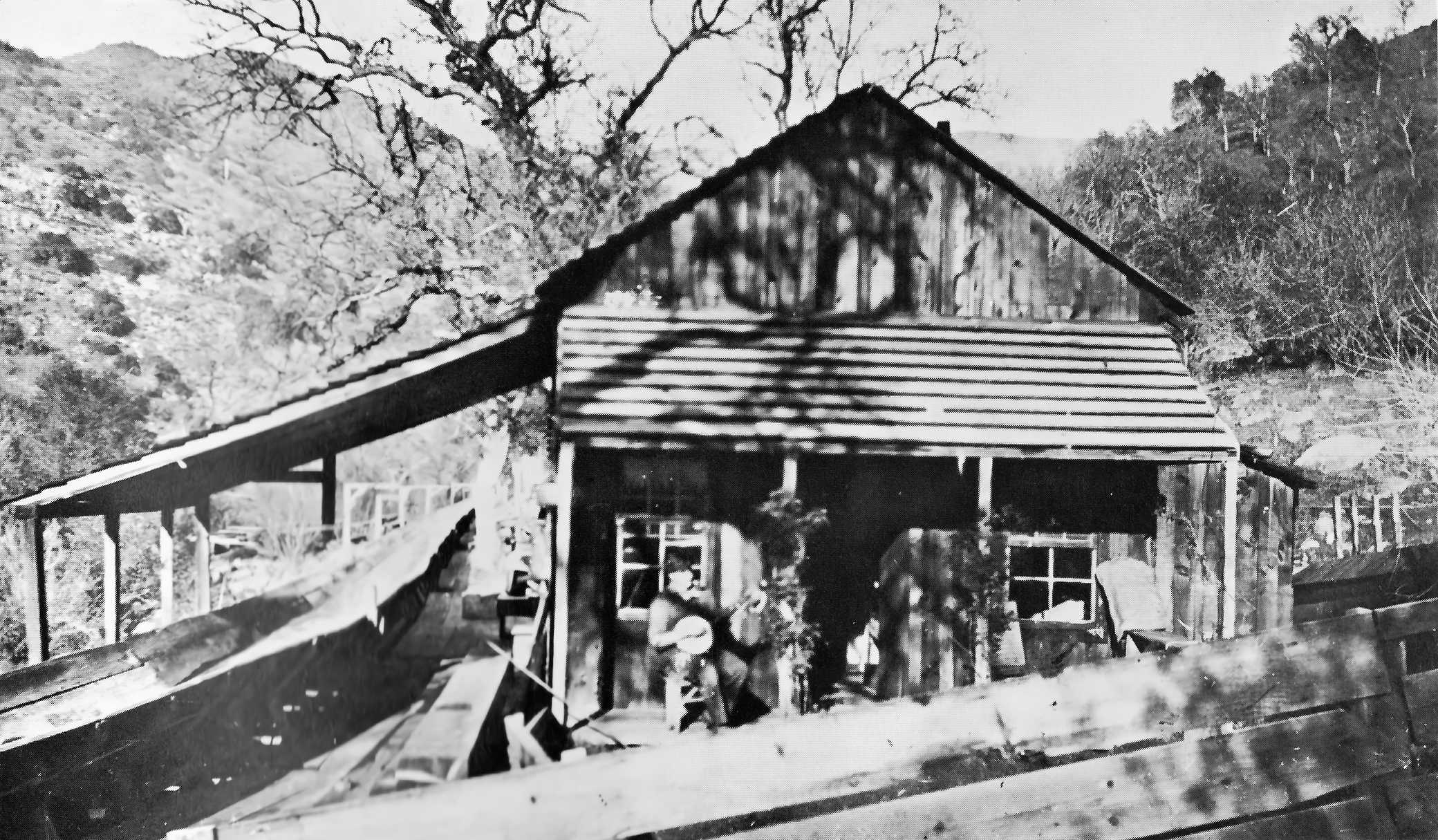
A flume house along the 54-mile route of the Hume-Bennett flume.

=== Flume boats ===
On occasion, despite it being exceedingly dangerous, flume herders and others would ride down the flume in small craft or boats, either for inspection or for thrills. Such rides were the precursor of the modern log-ride amusement park attractions.

Every flume boat was one of a kind, but they shared common design characteristics. They were V-shaped to fit the flume trough. An open front allowed water in for stability in the curves. A closed back allowed water to push the craft forward. Flat boards across the top created a platform for passengers and cargo.

Top speed depended on the grade of the flume. Flume boats on the Sanger Lumber Company flume, the "fastest chute in the world", traveled at 40 miles per hour (64 km/h). Boats traveled over steep trestles and curves with precipitous drops on either side without brakes or other means to slow the craft. Passengers described the sensation like "rushing through space suspended between earth and sky".

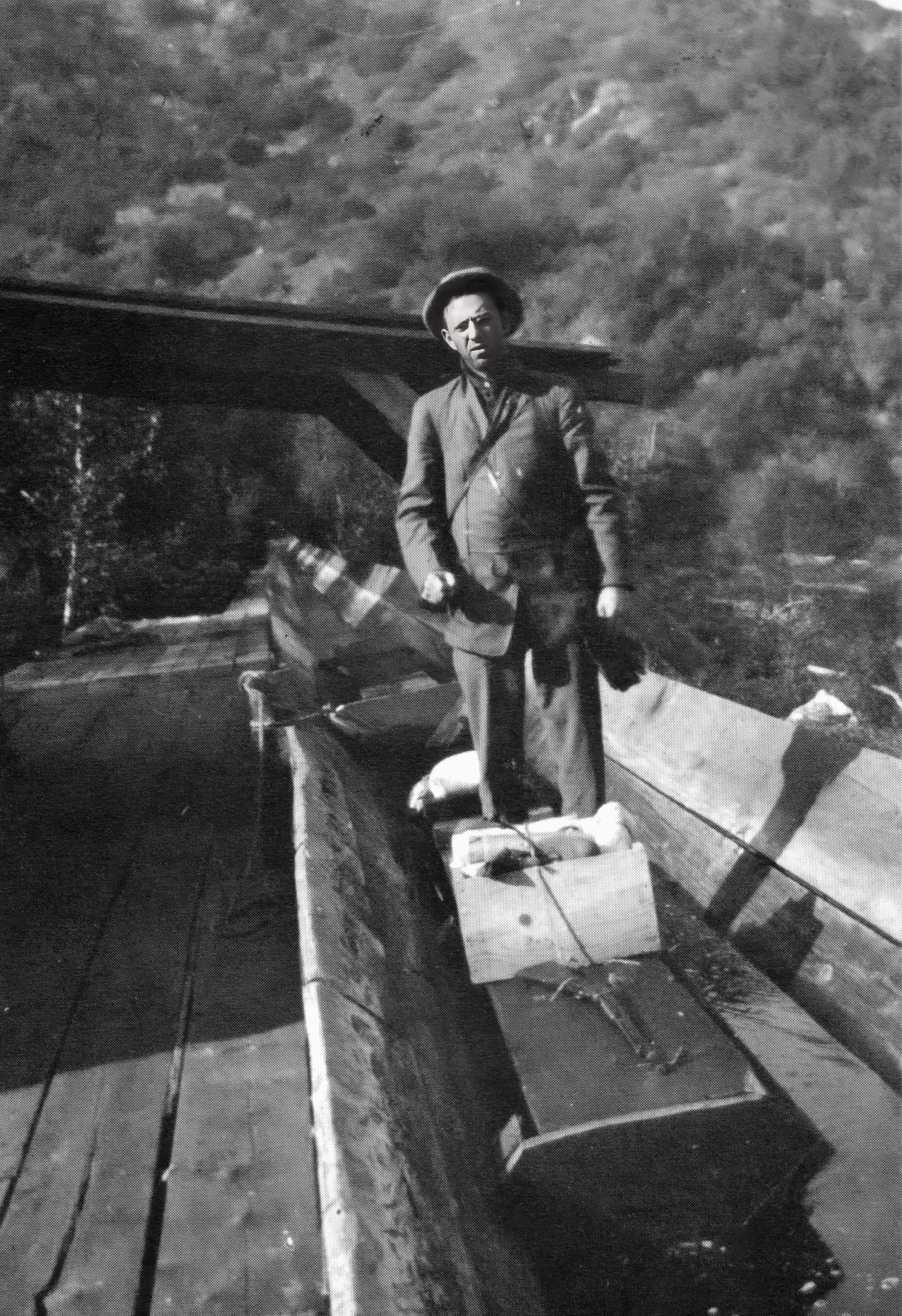
A flume boat loaded with a rifle and supplies.

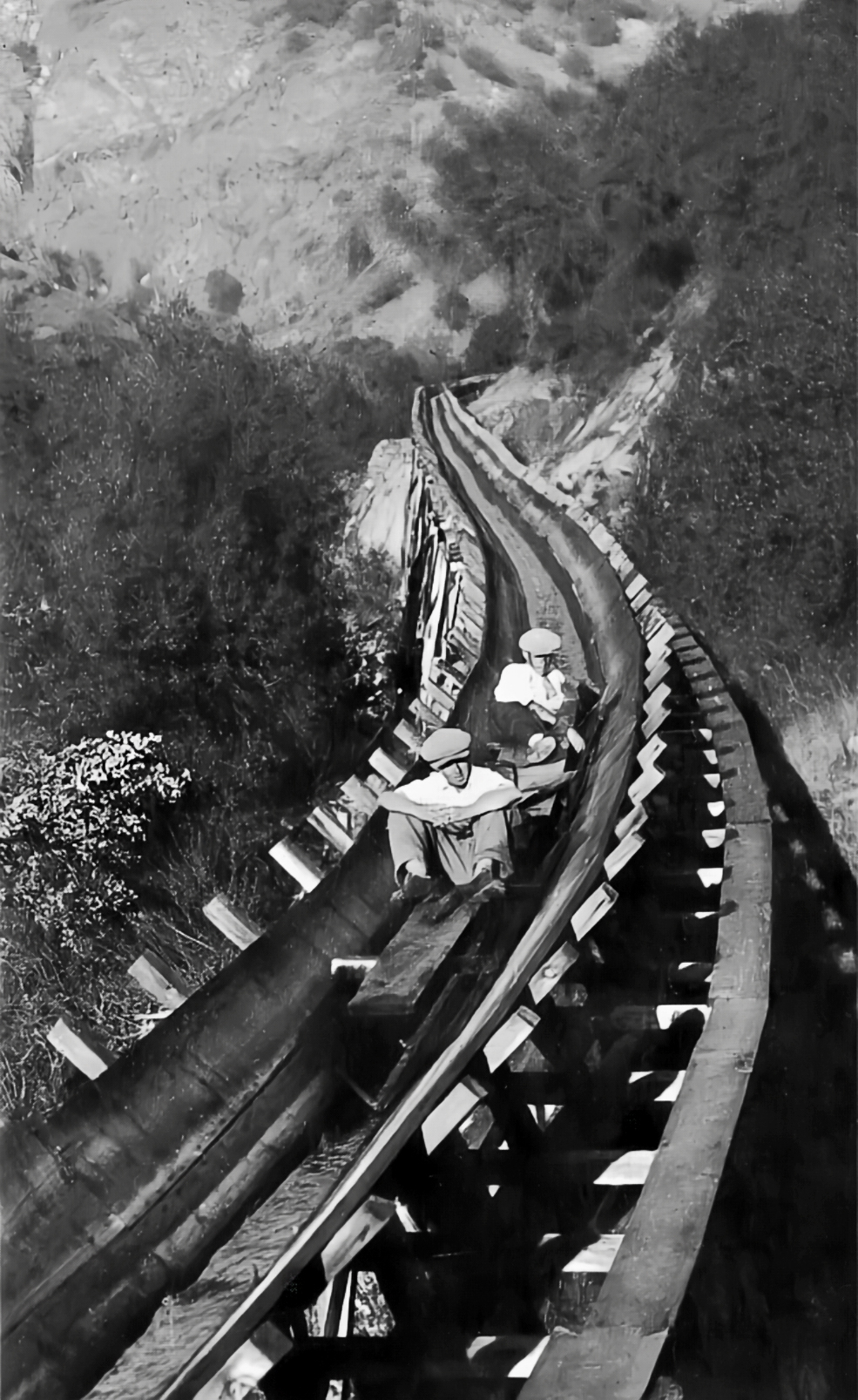
Flume boats shared a V-shaped design with an open front.

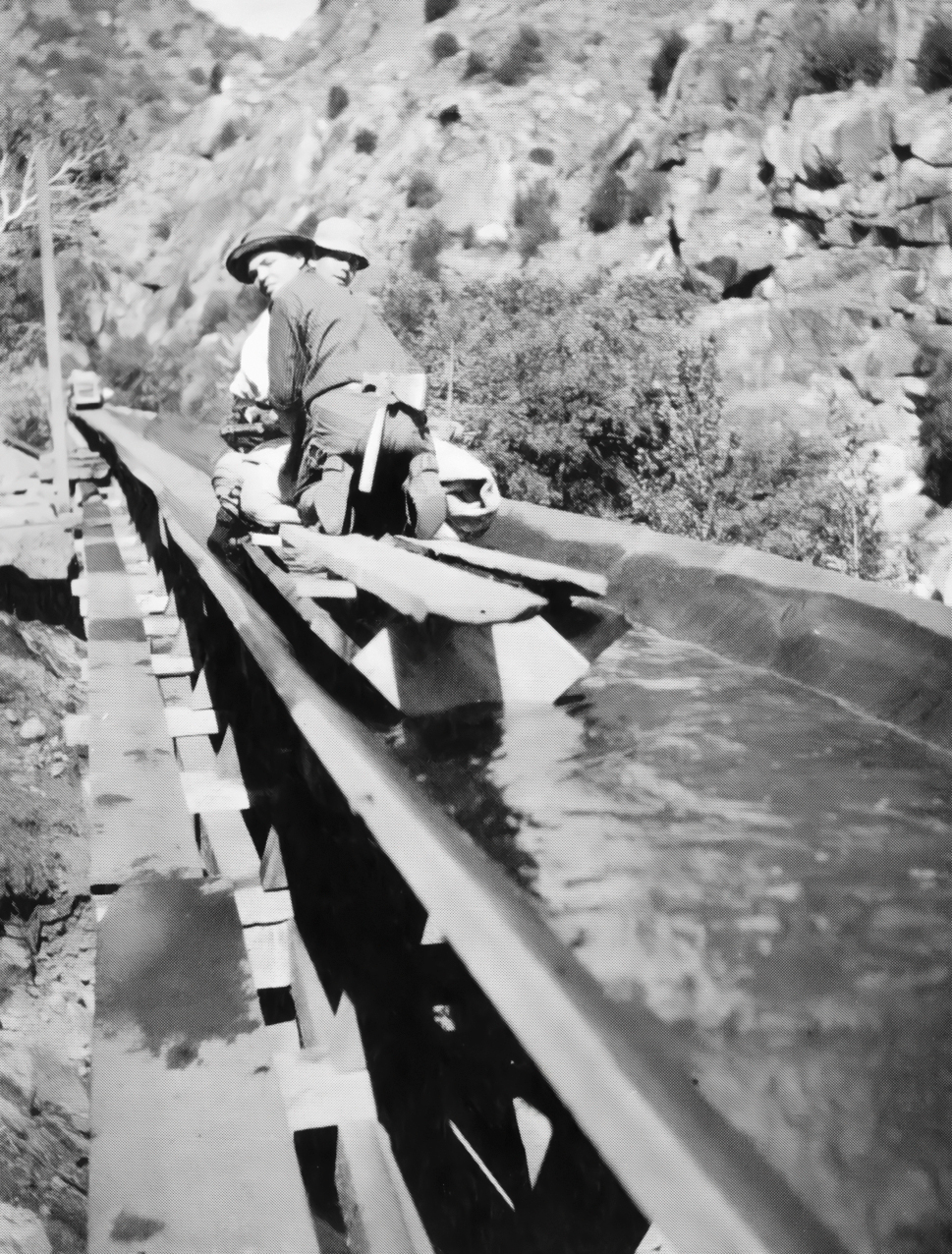
Making repairs aboard a flume boat.

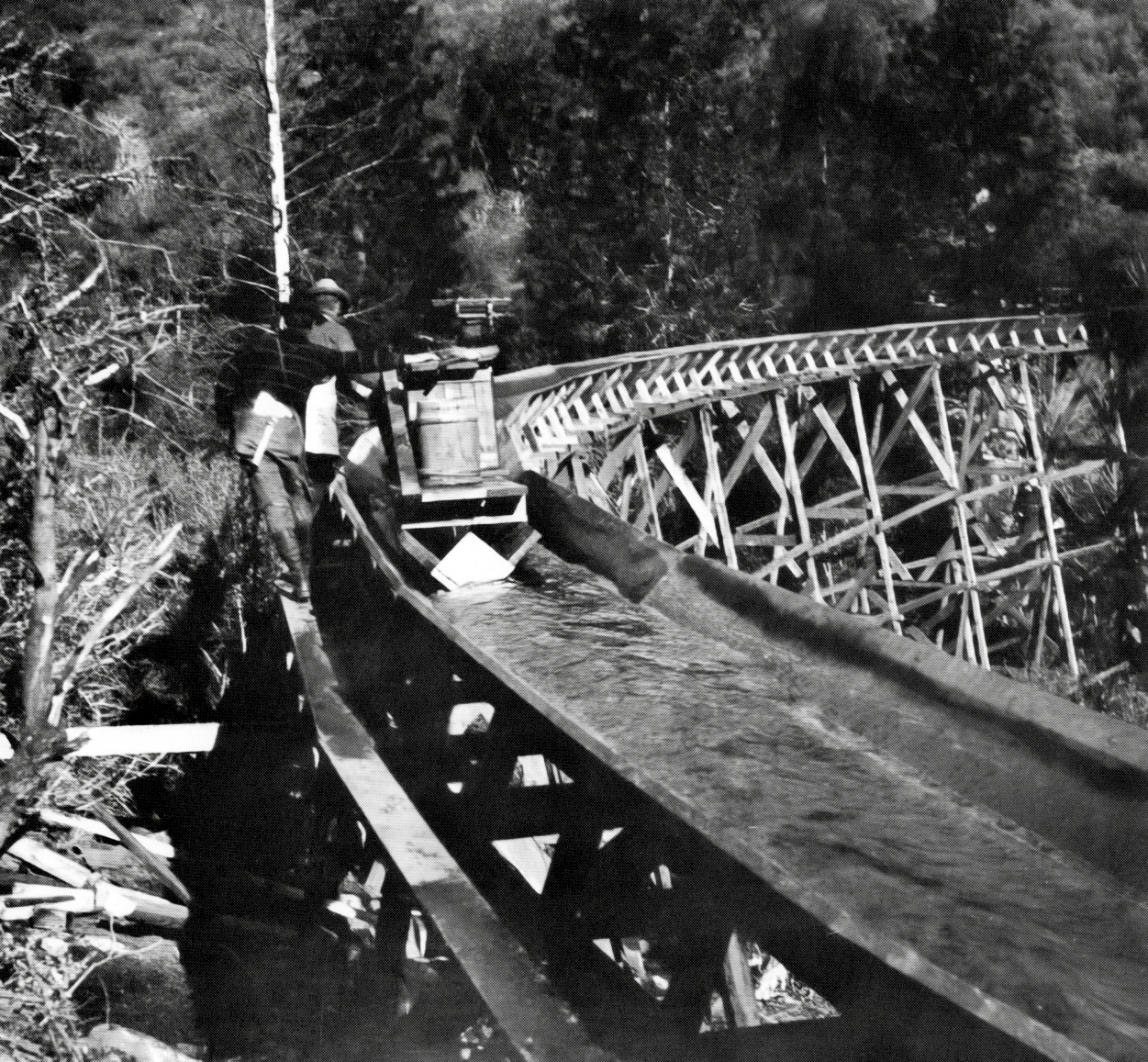
Workers on the catwalk guide a boat over a high trestle.

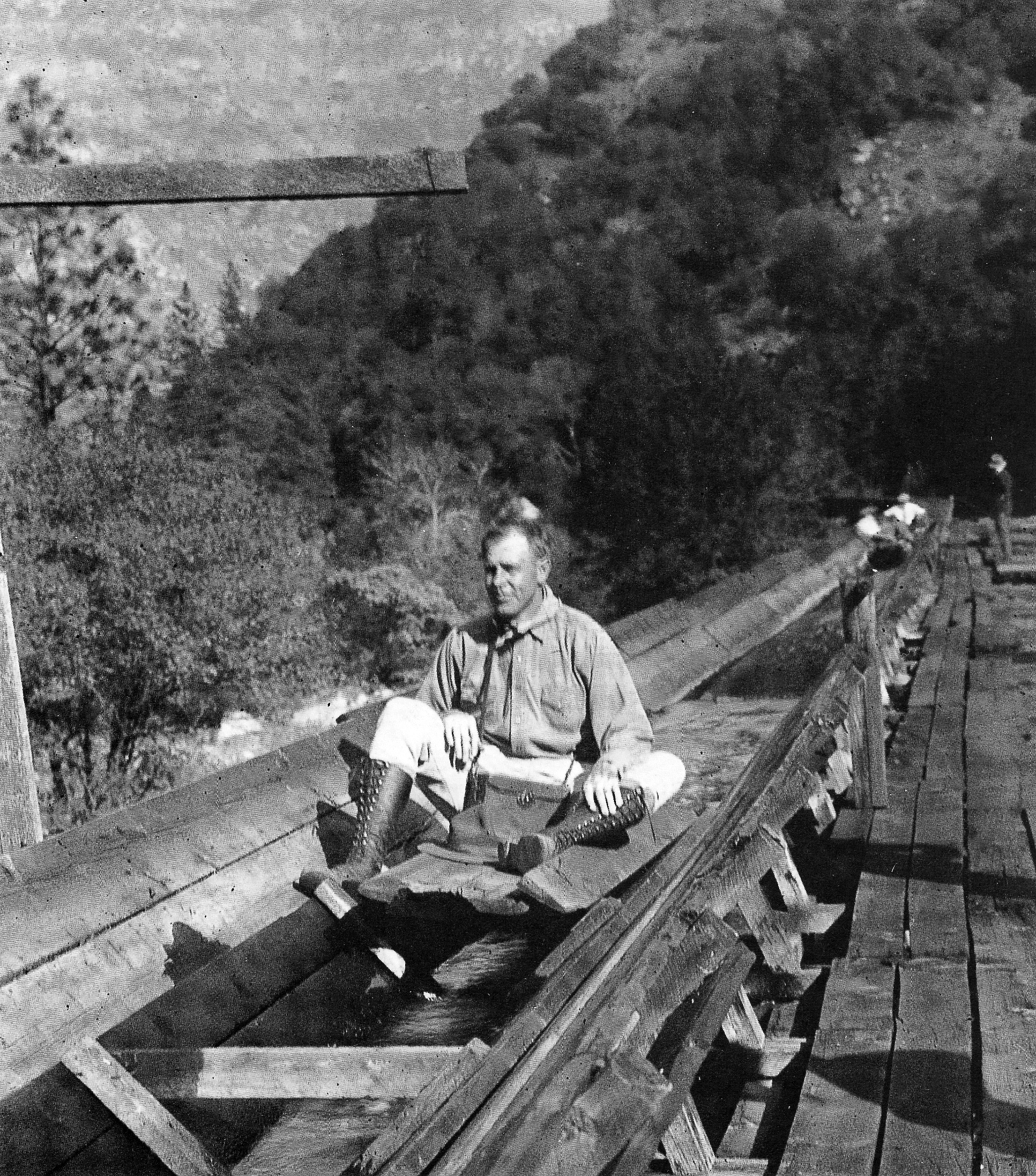
A United States Forest Service employee "shoots the chute".

== Flume terminals ==
There are a variety of flume terminals. The kind of terminal depends on the materials the flume transports and its disposal at the end point of a flume.

An elephant terminal splits from a central trunk into many forked branches. From there, logs are diverted into open branches by closing branches not in use. Logs collect at the end of the terminal in a loose pile. Other terminals shoot logs onto rollers that move them onto loading platforms. The water from the flume drives a waterwheel that drives the rollers. This arrangement works well with heavy railroad crossties or mining timbers.

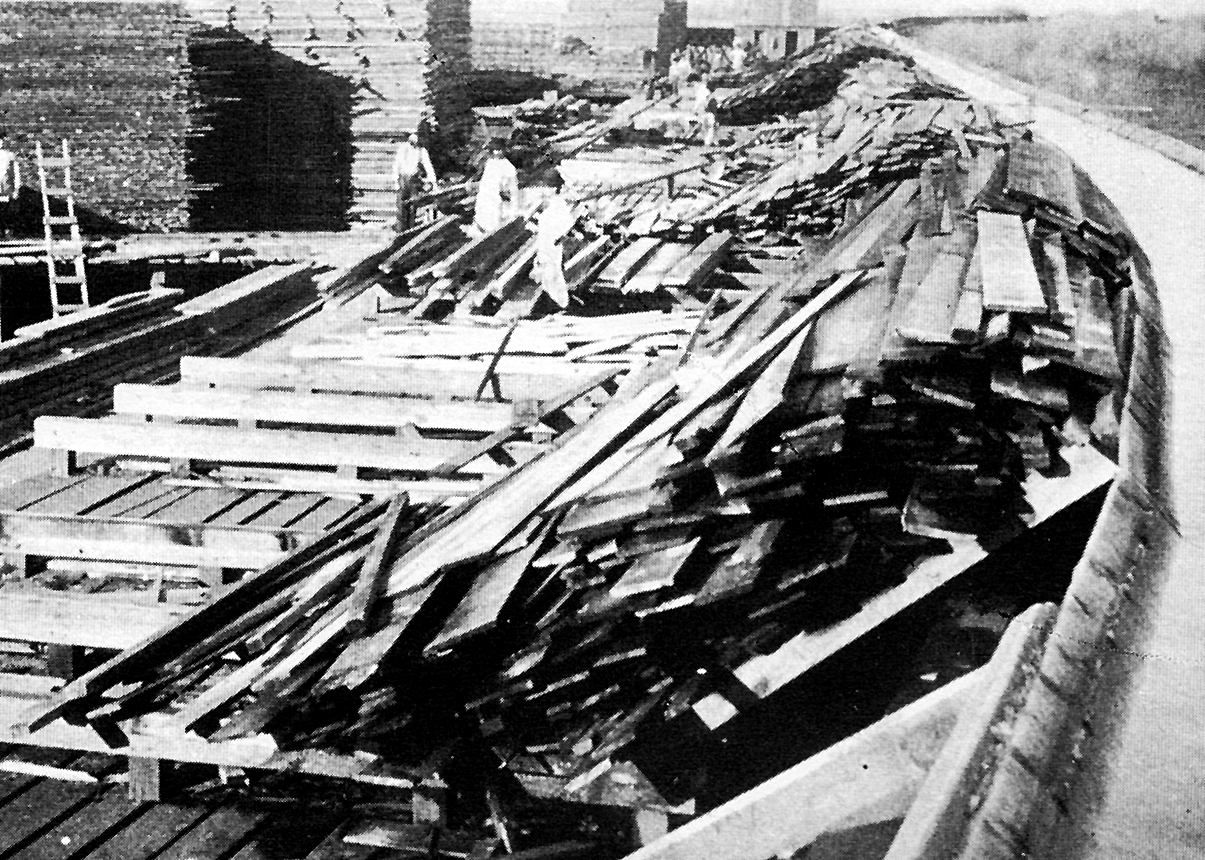
Loose lumber in a "dumper" pile.

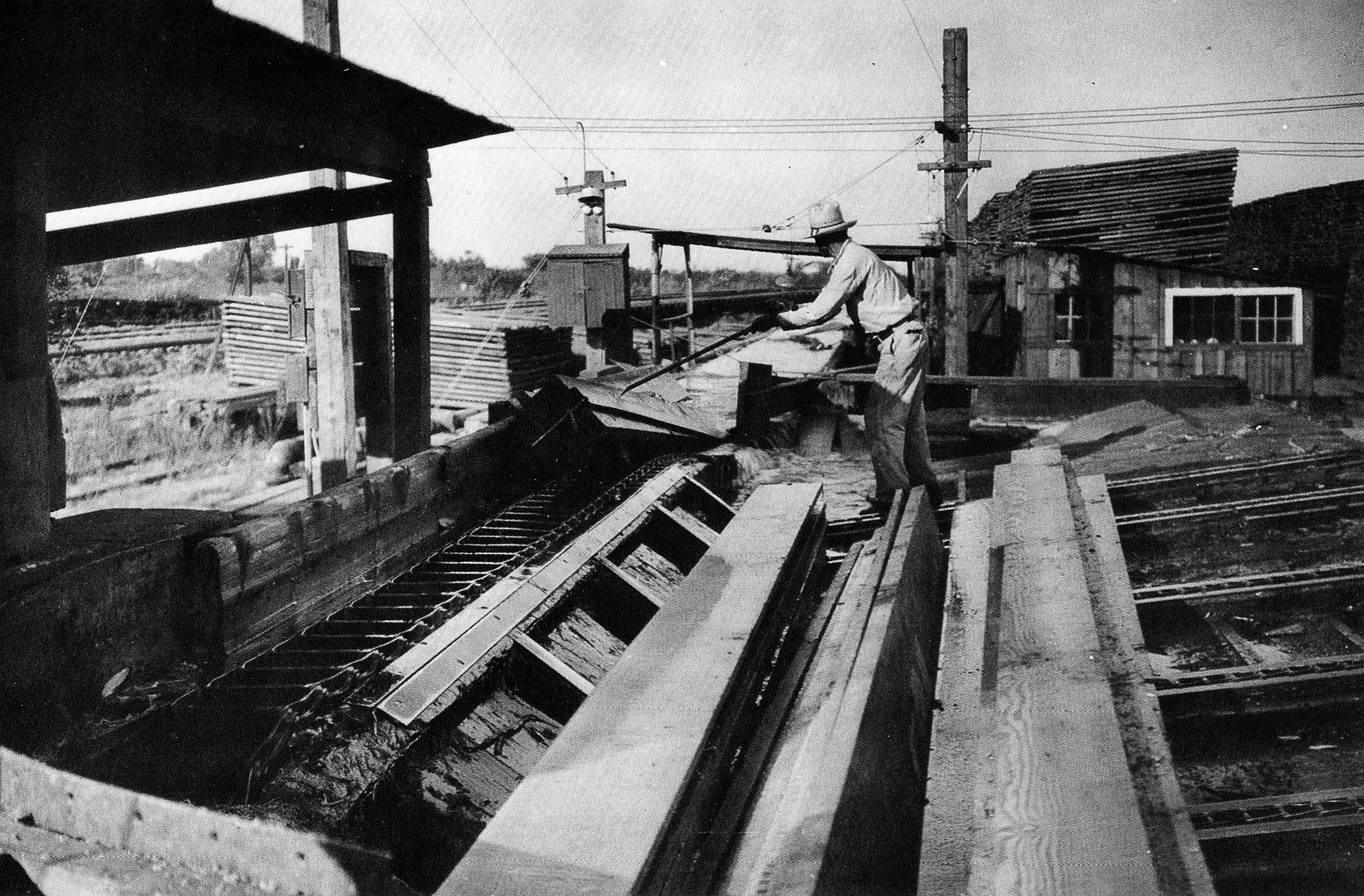
A bundle of lumber exits the flume onto a conveyor belt at the Madera Flume Terminal.

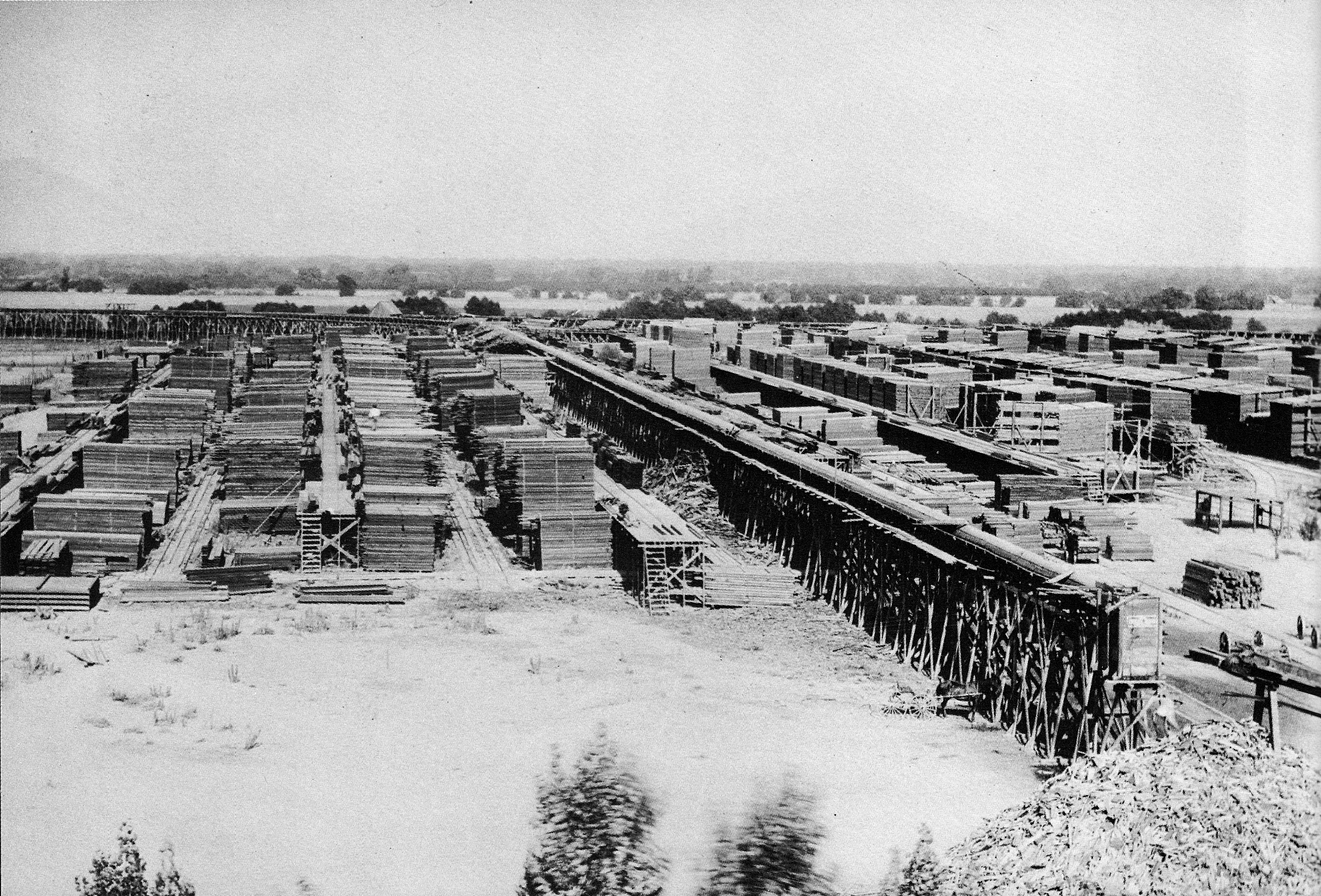
The flume terminal of the Hume-Bennett Lumber Company in Sanger.

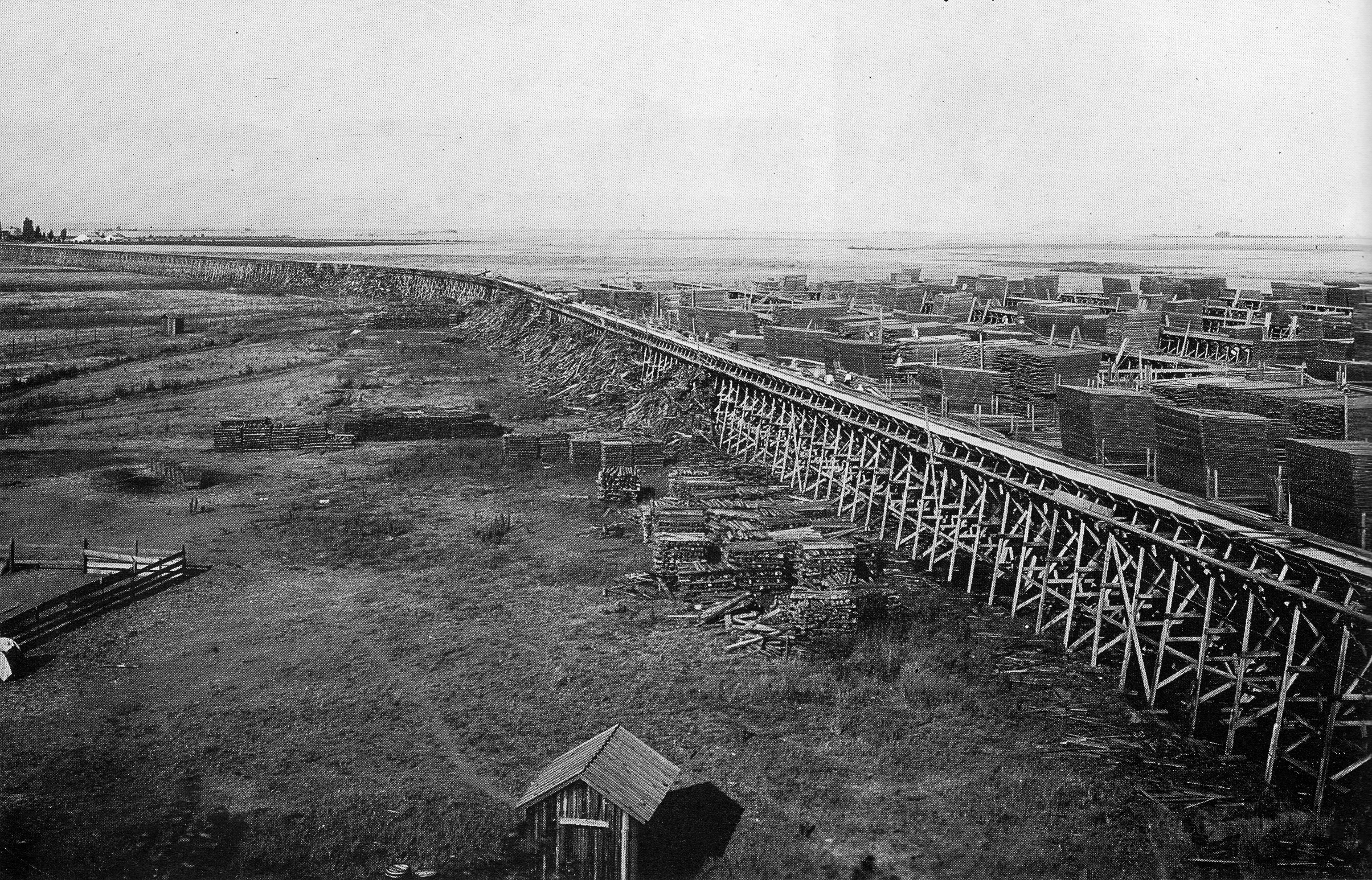
The flume terminal of the Fresno Flume and Irrigation Company in Clovis.

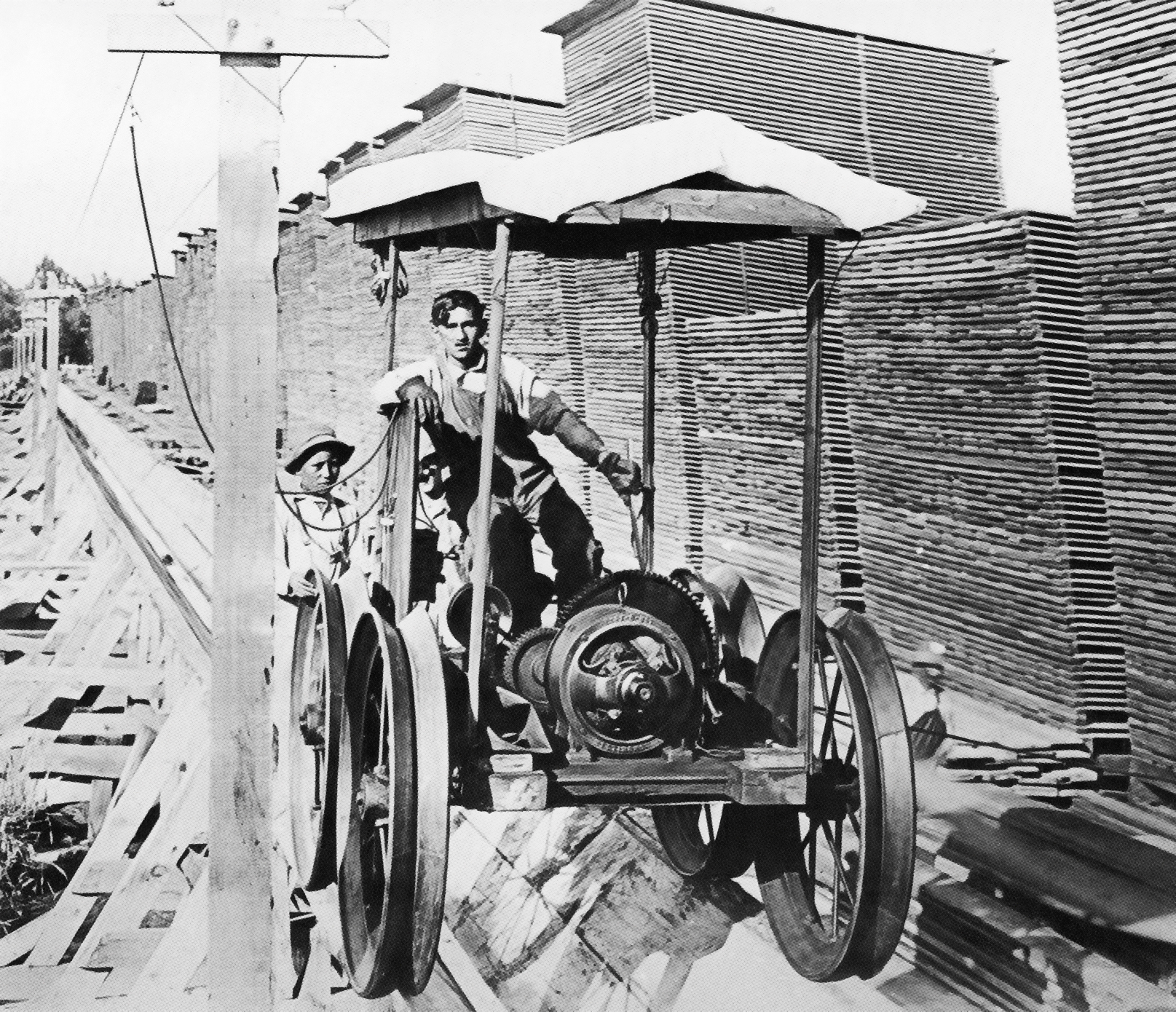
An electric-powered flume cart raises boards to the tops of the drying piles.

== Longest flumes ==
In the late 19th century, three rival California lumber companies built log flumes of unprecedented and nearly identical length. Each served the same purpose: to link their logging operations in the Sierra Nevada to railroad shipping depots in the San Joaquin Valley.

- In 1877, The California Lumber Company completed a 54 miles (87 km) flume to connect the mill at Nelder Grove to the shipping depot at Madera.
- In 1890, the Kings River Lumber Company completed the 62 miles (100 km) Kings River Flume from the upper Kings River area to Sanger.
- In 1891, the Fresno Flume and Irrigation Company built a 65 miles (105 km) flume to connect the sawmill at Shaver Lake with the planing mill and shipping depot at Clovis.

All three were purported to be "world's longest flume". However, some measurements may have been exaggerated or subject to inaccurate surveying methods. Contemporary attempts at confirmation are inconclusive.

Logging trucks started to replace flumes in the 1910s. Trucks offered mobility, lower operating costs, and did not rely on the availability of water. Many of the great flumes fell into disrepair and were salvaged for lumber. By 1984, only one lumber flume was operating in the United States. The Broughton Lumber flume was a nine-mile (14 km) V-flume that transported rough-sawn lumber from Willard, Washington to a finishing mill in Hood, just west of the town of Underwood. The flume closed down on December 19, 1986.

== See also ==
- Timber slide, similar to log flumes but used on rivers to bypass rapids and falls
