= List of United Kingdom locations: Hu-Hz =

The United Kingdom

This is part of the list of United Kingdom locations: a gazetteer of place names in the United Kingdom showing each place's locality and geographical coordinates.

== Hu ==
=== Hub-Hum ===
Location	Locality	Coordinates (links to map & photo sources)	OS grid reference
Hubbard's Hill	Kent	51.24°N 00.19°E	TQ5352
Hubberholme	North Yorkshire	54.19°N 02.12°W	SD9278
Hubberston	Pembrokeshire	51.71°N 05.05°W	SM8906
Hubbersty Head	Cumbria	54.31°N 02.89°W	SD4291
Hubberton Green	Calderdale	53.69°N 01.95°W	SE0322
Hubbert's Bridge	Lincolnshire	52.96°N 00.12°W	TF2643
Huby	Harrogate, North Yorkshire	53.91°N 01.59°W	SE2747
Huby	Hambleton, North Yorkshire	54.07°N 01.14°W	SE5665
Hucclecote	Gloucestershire	51.85°N 02.20°W	SO8617
Hucking	Kent	51.29°N 00.63°E	TQ8458
Hucknall	Nottinghamshire	53.03°N 01.21°W	SK5349
Huddersfield	Kirklees	53.64°N 01.78°W	SE1416
Huddington	Worcestershire	52.21°N 02.08°W	SO9457
Huddisford	Devon	50.94°N 04.42°W	SS3019
Huddlesford	Staffordshire	52.67°N 01.77°W	SK1509
Hud Hey	Lancashire	53.71°N 02.33°W	SD7824
Hudnall	Hertfordshire	51.80°N 00.55°W	TL0013
Hudnalls	Gloucestershire	51.72°N 02.66°W	SO5403
Hudswell	North Yorkshire	54.39°N 01.78°W	NZ1400
Hudswell	Wiltshire	51.42°N 02.21°W	ST8569
Huggate	East Riding of Yorkshire	53.98°N 00.65°W	SE8855
Hugglepit	Devon	50.99°N 04.42°W	SS3024
Hugglescote	Leicestershire	52.70°N 01.37°W	SK4212
Hughenden Valley	Buckinghamshire	51.65°N 00.75°W	SU8696
Hughley	Shropshire	52.56°N 02.65°W	SO5697
Hugh Mill	Lancashire	53.68°N 02.25°W	SD8321
Hughton	Highland	57.43°N 04.55°W	NH4741
Hugh Town	Isles of Scilly	49.90°N 06.31°W	SV9010
Hugus	Cornwall	50.24°N 05.12°W	SW7743
Huish (near Instow)	Devon	51.04°N 04.16°W	SS4829
Huish (near Merton)	Devon	50.87°N 04.09°W	SS5311
Huish	Wiltshire	51.36°N 01.80°W	SU1463
Huish Champflower	Somerset	51.05°N 03.37°W	ST0429
Huish Episcopi	Somerset	51.03°N 02.81°W	ST4326
Hulcote	Bedfordshire	52.03°N 00.63°W	SP9438
Hulcote	Northamptonshire	52.13°N 00.97°W	SP7049
Hulcott	Buckinghamshire	51.83°N 00.76°W	SP8516
Hulham	Devon	50.63°N 03.40°W	SY0183
Hull	East Riding of Yorkshire	53.98°N 00.38°W	TA0928
Hulland	Derbyshire	53.01°N 01.64°W	SK2446
Hulland Moss	Derbyshire	53.01°N 01.62°W	SK2546
Hulland Ward	Derbyshire	53.02°N 01.62°W	SK2547
Hullavington	Wiltshire	51.53°N 02.16°W	ST8982
Hull Bridge	East Riding of Yorkshire	53.86°N 00.39°W	TA0541
Hullbridge	Essex	51.61°N 00.61°E	TQ8194
Hull End	Derbyshire	53.33°N 01.92°W	SK0582
Hulme	Trafford	53.46°N 02.25°W	SJ8396
Hulme	Cheshire	53.41°N 02.60°W	SJ6091
Hulme	Staffordshire	53.00°N 02.10°W	SJ9345
Hulme End	Staffordshire	53.12°N 01.85°W	SK1059
Hulme Walfield	Cheshire	53.18°N 02.24°W	SJ8465
Hulseheath	Cheshire	53.34°N 02.42°W	SJ7283
Hulverstone	Isle of Wight	50.65°N 01.44°W	SZ3984
Hulver Street	Suffolk	52.41°N 01.63°E	TM4786
Humber	Devon	50.55°N 03.56°W	SX8974
Humber	Herefordshire	52.20°N 02.68°W	SO5356
Humberston	North East Lincolnshire	53.52°N 00.02°W	TA3105
Humberstone	City of Leicester	52.63°N 01.08°W	SK6205
Humberston Fitties	North East Lincolnshire	53.52°N 00.01°E	TA3305
Humberton	North Yorkshire	54.11°N 01.35°W	SE4268
Humbie	East Lothian	55.84°N 02.88°W	NT4562
Humbledon	Sunderland	54.88°N 01.42°W	NZ3755
Humble Green	Suffolk	52.07°N 00.81°E	TL9345
Humbleton	East Riding of Yorkshire	53.78°N 00.14°W	TA2234
Humby	Lincolnshire	52.87°N 00.51°W	TF0032
Hume	Scottish Borders	55.66°N 02.47°W	NT7041
Humla	Highland	57.01°N 06.61°W	NG197005
Hummersknott	Darlington	54.52°N 01.59°W	NZ2614
Humshaugh	Northumberland	55.03°N 02.14°W	NY9171

=== Hun ===
Location	Locality	Coordinates (links to map & photo sources)	OS grid reference
Huncoat	Lancashire	53.76°N 02.35°W	SD7730
Huncote	Leicestershire	52.56°N 01.24°W	SP5197
Hunda	Orkney Islands	58.85°N 02.97°W	ND436971
Hundalee	Scottish Borders	55.45°N 02.57°W	NT6418
Hundall	Derbyshire	53.28°N 01.43°W	SK3877
Hunder Holm	Shetland Islands	60.35°N 01.07°W	HU513634
Hunderthwaite	Durham	54.58°N 02.03°W	NY9821
Hunderton	Herefordshire	52.03°N 02.74°W	SO4938
Hundleby	Lincolnshire	53.17°N 00.06°E	TF3866
Hundle Houses	Lincolnshire	53.06°N 00.15°W	TF2453
Hundleshope	Scottish Borders	55.61°N 03.22°W	NT2336
Hundleton	Pembrokeshire	51.66°N 04.95°W	SM9600
Hundon	Suffolk	52.10°N 00.52°E	TL7348
Hundred End	Lancashire	53.69°N 02.89°W	SD4122
Hundred House	Powys	52.17°N 03.30°W	SO1154
Huney	Shetland Islands	60.73°N 00.81°W	HP647064
Hungarton	Leicestershire	52.65°N 00.98°W	SK6907
Hungate	Leeds	53.72°N 01.44°W	SE3726
Hungerford	Somerset	51.15°N 03.37°W	ST0440
Hungerford	Shropshire	52.49°N 02.69°W	SO5389
Hungerford (Waltham St Lawrence)	Berkshire	51.45°N 00.82°W	SU8274
Hungerford (town)	Berkshire	51.41°N 01.52°W	SU3368
Hungerford Green	Berkshire	51.50°N 01.20°W	SU5579
Hungerford Newtown	Berkshire	51.43°N 01.49°W	SU3571
Hunger Hill	Lancashire	53°35′49″N 2°41′47″W	SD5311
Hunger Hill	Bolton	53.55°N 02.49°W	SD6706
Hungershall Park	Kent	51.11°N 00.24°E	TQ5738
Hungerstone	Herefordshire	52.01°N 02.81°W	SO4435
Hungerton	Lincolnshire	52.86°N 00.70°W	SK8730
Hungladder	Highland	57.65°N 06.39°W	NG3871
Hungryhatton	Shropshire	52.83°N 02.49°W	SJ6726
Hunmanby	North Yorkshire	54.17°N 00.33°W	TA0977
Hunmanby Moor	North Yorkshire	54.17°N 00.30°W	TA1177
Hunningham	Warwickshire	52.30°N 01.45°W	SP3768
Hunningham Hill	Warwickshire	52.30°N 01.44°W	SP3867
Hunnington	Worcestershire	52.42°N 02.06°W	SO9681
Hunny Hill	Isle of Wight	50.69°N 01.30°W	SZ4989
Hunsdon	Hertfordshire	51.80°N 00.04°E	TL4114
Hunsdonbury	Hertfordshire	51.79°N 00.04°E	TL4113
Hunsingore	North Yorkshire	53.97°N 01.36°W	SE4253
Hunslet	Leeds	53.77°N 01.54°W	SE3031
Hunslet Carr	Leeds	53.76°N 01.54°W	SE3030
Hunsonby	Cumbria	54.70°N 02.65°W	NY5835
Hunstanton	Norfolk	52.93°N 00.48°E	TF6740
Hunstanworth	Durham	54.83°N 02.09°W	NY9449
Hunsterson	Cheshire	53.01°N 02.46°W	SJ6946
Hunston	West Sussex	50.80°N 00.78°W	SU8601
Hunston	Suffolk	52.27°N 00.88°E	TL9768
Hunston Green	Suffolk	52.25°N 00.89°E	TL9866
Hunstrete	Bath and North East Somerset	51.35°N 02.51°W	ST6462
Hunsworth	Kirklees	53.73°N 01.72°W	SE1827
Hunt End	Worcestershire	52.27°N 01.95°W	SP0364
Huntenhull Green	Wiltshire	51.22°N 02.25°W	ST8247
Huntercombe End	Oxfordshire	51.57°N 01.01°W	SU6887
Hunters Forstal	Kent	51.35°N 01.12°E	TR1866
Hunter's Quay	Argyll and Bute	55.96°N 04.91°W	NS1879
Huntham	Somerset	51.02°N 02.95°W	ST3325
Huntingdon	Cambridgeshire	52.33°N 00.18°W	TL2472
Huntingfield	Suffolk	52.31°N 01.41°E	TM3374
Huntingford	Dorset	51.06°N 02.28°W	ST8029
Huntingford	South Gloucestershire	51.63°N 02.42°W	ST7193
Huntington	Cheshire	53.17°N 02.86°W	SJ4264
Huntington	East Lothian	55.95°N 02.83°W	NT4874
Huntington (parish)	Herefordshire	52.17°N 03.09°W	SO2553
Huntington (Hereford)	Herefordshire	52.06°N 02.76°W	SO4841
Huntington	Shropshire	52.65°N 02.51°W	SJ6507
Huntington	Staffordshire	52.70°N 02.04°W	SJ9712
Huntington	York	53.98°N 01.07°W	SE6155
Huntingtower	Perth and Kinross	56.39°N 03.50°W	NO0724
Huntingtower Haugh	Perth and Kinross	56.40°N 03.50°W	NO0725
Huntley	Gloucestershire	51.86°N 02.40°W	SO7219
Huntley	Staffordshire	52.96°N 02.00°W	SK0041
Huntly	Aberdeenshire	57.44°N 02.80°W	NJ5240
Hunton	Hampshire	51.14°N 01.31°W	SU4839
Hunton	Kent	51.21°N 00.44°E	TQ7149
Hunton	North Yorkshire	54.32°N 01.72°W	SE1892
Hunton Bridge	Hertfordshire	51.68°N 00.43°W	TL0800
Hunt's Corner	Norfolk	52.45°N 01.01°E	TM0588
Huntscott	Somerset	51.17°N 03.54°W	SS9243
Hunt's Cross	Liverpool	53.35°N 02.87°W	SJ4284
Hunts Green	Warwickshire	52.57°N 01.73°W	SP1897
Hunt's Green	Buckinghamshire	51.71°N 00.71°W	SP8903
Hunts Green	Berkshire	51.42°N 01.38°W	SU4370
Huntsham	Devon	50.97°N 03.42°W	ST0020
Huntshaw	Devon	50.97°N 04.13°W	SS5022
Huntshaw Water	Devon	50.98°N 04.13°W	SS5023
Hunt's Hill	Buckinghamshire	51.65°N 00.78°W	SU8496
Hunt's Lane	Leicestershire	52.62°N 01.33°W	SK4503
Huntstile	Somerset	51.09°N 03.05°W	ST2633
Huntworth	Somerset	51.10°N 02.98°W	ST3134
Hunwick	Durham	54.68°N 01.70°W	NZ1932
Hunworth	Norfolk	52.87°N 01.05°E	TG0635

=== Hur-Huy ===
Location	Locality	Coordinates (links to map & photo sources)	OS grid reference
Hurcot (Somerton)	Somerset	51.05°N 02.71°W	ST5029
Hurcott (Seavington St Mary)	Somerset	50.94°N 02.86°W	ST3916
Hurcott	Worcestershire	52.39°N 02.22°W	SO8577
Hurdcott	Wiltshire	51.09°N 01.75°W	SU1733
Hurdley	Powys	52.53°N 03.04°W	SO2994
Hurdsfield	Cheshire	53.26°N 02.12°W	SJ9274
Hurgill	North Yorkshire	54.40°N 01.75°W	NZ1601
Hurlet	East Renfrewshire	55.81°N 04.37°W	NS5161
Hurley	Warwickshire	52.56°N 01.64°W	SP2496
Hurley	Berkshire	51.54°N 00.81°W	SU8283
Hurley Bottom	Berkshire	51.54°N 00.81°W	SU8283
Hurley Common	Warwickshire	52.56°N 01.64°W	SP2496
Hurlford	East Ayrshire	55.59°N 04.46°W	NS4536
Hurliness	Orkney Islands	58.78°N 03.24°W	ND2889
Hurlston	Lancashire	53.58°N 02.90°W	SD4010
Hurlston Green	Lancashire	53.59°N 02.92°W	SD3911
Hurn	Dorset	50.76°N 01.83°W	SZ1296
Hurn	East Riding of Yorkshire	53.84°N 00.45°W	TA0240
Hurn's End	Lincolnshire	53.01°N 00.11°E	TF4249
Hursey	Dorset	50.81°N 02.81°W	ST4302
Hursley	Hampshire	51.02°N 01.40°W	SU4225
Hurst	Berkshire	51.45°N 00.86°W	SU7973
Hurst	Cumbria	54.75°N 02.91°W	NY4140
Hurst	Dorset	50.70°N 02.29°W	SY7990
Hurst	Bexley	51.439°N 00.125°E	TQ478733
Hurst	North Yorkshire	54.42°N 01.93°W	NZ0402
Hurst	Somerset	50.95°N 02.78°W	ST4518
Hurst	Tameside	53.49°N 02.09°W	SD9400
Hurstbourne Priors	Hampshire	51.21°N 01.38°W	SU4346
Hurstbourne Tarrant	Hampshire	51.27°N 01.45°W	SU3853
Hurstead	Rochdale	53.63°N 02.13°W	SD9115
Hurst Green	East Sussex	51.01°N 00.46°E	TQ7327
Hurst Green	Dudley	52.46°N 02.03°W	SO9885
Hurst Green	Essex	51.80°N 01.03°E	TM0916
Hurst Green	Surrey	51.24°N 00.01°W	TQ3951
Hurst Green	Lancashire	53.83°N 02.48°W	SD6838
Hurst Hill	Dudley	52.54°N 02.10°W	SO9394
Hurstley	Herefordshire	52.12°N 02.95°W	SO3548
Hurst Park	Surrey	51.39°N 00.37°W	TQ1368
Hurstpierpoint	West Sussex	50.92°N 00.17°W	TQ2816
Hurst Wickham	West Sussex	50.92°N 00.16°W	TQ2916
Hurstwood	Lancashire	53.77°N 02.18°W	SD8831
Hurtmore	Surrey	51.19°N 00.64°W	SU9545
Hurworth-on-Tees	Darlington	54.48°N 01.53°W	NZ3010
Hurworth Place	Darlington	54.48°N 01.55°W	NZ2910
Hury	Durham	54.56°N 02.07°W	NY9519
Husbands Bosworth	Leicestershire	52.45°N 01.05°W	SP6484
Husborne Crawley	Bedfordshire	52.00°N 00.61°W	SP9535
Hushinish	Western Isles	57.99°N 07.11°W	NA9812
Hushinish Point	Western Isles	57.99°N 07.10°W	NA982115
Huskeiran	Western Isles	57.54°N 07.73°W	NF570645
Husthwaite	North Yorkshire	54.16°N 01.22°W	SE5175
Hutcherleigh	Devon	50.33°N 03.71°W	SX7850
Hutchesontown	City of Glasgow	55.84°N 04.25°W	NS5963
Hut Green	North Yorkshire	53.70°N 01.15°W	SE5623
Huthwaite	Nottinghamshire	53.12°N 01.31°W	SK467592
Hutlerburn	Scottish Borders	55.50°N 02.95°W	NT4024
Huttock Top	Lancashire	53.69°N 02.21°W	SD8622
Huttoft	Lincolnshire	53.25°N 00.26°E	TF5176
Hutton	Cumbria	54.62°N 02.88°W	NY4326
Hutton	East Riding of Yorkshire	53.96°N 00.44°W	TA0253
Hutton	Essex	51.63°N 00.35°E	TQ6395
Hutton	Lancashire	53.72°N 02.77°W	SD4926
Hutton	North Somerset	51.31°N 02.93°W	ST3558
Hutton	Scottish Borders	55.77°N 02.16°W	NT9053
Hutton Bonville	North Yorkshire	54.39°N 01.47°W	NZ3400
Hutton Buscel	North Yorkshire	54.24°N 00.51°W	SE9784
Hutton Conyers	North Yorkshire	54.15°N 01.51°W	SE3273
Hutton Cranswick	East Riding of Yorkshire	53.95°N 00.44°W	TA0252
Hutton End	Cumbria	54.73°N 02.87°W	NY4438
Hutton Gate	Redcar and Cleveland	54.52°N 01.08°W	NZ5915
Hutton Hang	North Yorkshire	54.28°N 01.74°W	SE1788
Hutton Henry	Durham	54.71°N 01.34°W	NZ4236
Hutton-le-Hole	North Yorkshire	54.29°N 00.92°W	SE7089
Hutton Magna	Durham	54.50°N 01.81°W	NZ1212
Hutton Mount	Essex	51.62°N 00.32°E	TQ6194
Hutton Roof (Eden)	Cumbria	54.69°N 02.97°W	NY3734
Hutton Roof (South Lakeland)	Cumbria	54.19°N 02.66°W	SD5778
Hutton Rudby	North Yorkshire	54.44°N 01.29°W	NZ4606
Huttons Ambo	North Yorkshire	54.09°N 00.83°W	SE7667
Hutton Sessay	North Yorkshire	54.17°N 01.28°W	SE4776
Hutton Village	Redcar and Cleveland	54.50°N 01.07°W	NZ6013
Hutton Wandesley	North Yorkshire	53.94°N 01.23°W	SE5050
Huxham	Devon	50.76°N 03.50°W	SX9497
Huxham Green	Somerset	51.12°N 02.58°W	ST5936
Huxley	Cheshire	53.14°N 02.74°W	SJ5061
Huxter	Shetland Islands	60.29°N 01.69°W	HU1757
Huyton	Knowsley	53.41°N 02.84°W	SJ4491
Huyton Park	Knowsley	53.40°N 02.84°W	SJ4490
Huyton Quarry	Knowsley	53.40°N 02.82°W	SJ4590
Huyton-With-Roby	Knowsley	53.41°N 02.84°W	SJ4491

== Hw ==
Location	Locality	Coordinates (links to map & photo sources)	OS grid reference
Hwlffordd	(Haverfordwest) Pembrokeshire	51.79°N 04.97°W	SM9515

== Hy ==
Location	Locality	Coordinates (links to map & photo sources)	OS grid reference
Hycemoor	Cumbria	54.28°N 03.39°W	SD0989
Hyde	Dorset	50.72°N 02.75°W	SY4792
Hyde (Minchinhampton)	Gloucestershire	51.70°N 02.17°W	SO8801
Hyde (Temple Guiting)	Gloucestershire	51.95°N 01.88°W	SP0828
Hyde	Tameside	53.44°N 02.09°W	SJ9494
Hyde (New Forest)	Hampshire	50.90°N 01.77°W	SU1612
Hyde (Winchester)	Hampshire	51.06°N 01.31°W	SU4830
Hyde	Herefordshire	52.19°N 02.80°W	SO4555
Hyde Chase	Essex	51.69°N 00.60°E	TL8003
Hyde End	Berkshire	51.36°N 01.21°W	SU5563
Hyde Heath	Buckinghamshire	51.69°N 00.65°W	SP9300
Hyde Lea	Staffordshire	52.77°N 02.13°W	SJ9120
Hyde Park	Sheffield	53.383°N 01.45°W	SK3687
Hydestile	Surrey	51.15°N 00.62°W	SU9640
Hylton Castle	Sunderland	54.91°N 01.45°W	NZ3558
Hylton Red House	Sunderland	54.92°N 01.43°W	NZ3659
Hyltons Crossways	Norfolk	52.80°N 01.30°E	TG2328
Hyndburn Bridge	Lancashire	53.78°N 02.39°W	SD7432
Hyndford Bridge	South Lanarkshire	55.65°N 03.73°W	NS9141
Hyndhope	Scottish Borders	55.47°N 03.01°W	NT3621
Hynish	Argyll and Bute	56.44°N 06.90°W	NL9839
Hysbackie	Highland	58.46°N 04.41°W	NC5955
Hyssington	Powys	52.53°N 03.01°W	SO3194
Hystfield	South Gloucestershire	51.66°N 02.49°W	ST6696
Hythe	Kent	51.06°N 01.08°E	TR1634
Hythe	Hampshire	50.86°N 01.40°W	SU4207
Hythe	Surrey	51.42°N 00.53°W	TQ0270
Hythe	Somerset	51.26°N 02.80°W	ST4452
Hythe End	Windsor and Maidenhead	51.43°N 00.54°W	TQ0172
Hythie	Aberdeenshire	57.54°N 02.00°W	NK0051
Hyton	Cumbria	54.27°N 03.39°W	SD0987
