= Hungate =

Hungate can refer to several people and places:

== Places ==
- Emneth Hungate
- Hungate, Lancashire, a location
- Hungate, Leicestershire, a location
- Hungate, Norwich
- Hungate, West Yorkshire, a location
- Hungate, Winchester
- Hungate (York), a street and surrounding area

== People ==
- David Hungate (born 1948), American bass guitarist
- Edmund Hungate Beaghan (1703–1755), English politician
- Robert Hungate (1906–2004), American microbiologist, pioneer of anaerobic microbial ecology
- Thomas Hungate (c.1516–1579), English politician
- William L. Hungate (1922–2007), American politician

== Other ==
- Hungate massacre, the murder of the Hungate family on June 11, 1864
- Hungate tube, small gas-tight tube conceived by the American microbiologist Robert Hungate to establish and maintain strict anoxic conditions needed to culture anaerobic microorganisms
