= Burrell & Son =

Scottish tramp shipping company

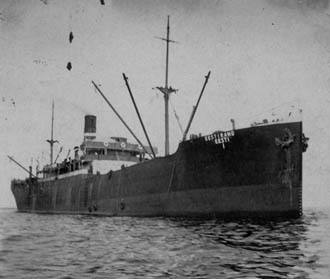
SS Eestirand in the 1930s. It was originally built in 1910 as the Strathardle for Burrell & Son.

Burrell & Son of Glasgow, Scotland was a leading tramp shipping company. It operated from 1850 to 1939 and was managed by the art collector William Burrell.

== Early years ==
The firm of Burrell & Son was established around 1850 by George Burrell and initially operated mainly on the Forth & Clyde Canal. The first coastal vessel was acquired in 1862. The first ships were sail, but they quickly moved into steam shipping. (Sir) William Burrell joined his father in the firm in 1876 at the age of 15. His brother George specialised in the technical and engineering side of the business while William specialised in the financial and commercial aspects. The two brothers took over the business when their father died in 1885.

== Operations ==
The type of trade they operated was called tramp shipping. Ships did not travel to set destinations at set times, but instead travelled wherever they could get a cargo. Traditionally tramp ships relied heavily on the captains to secure cargoes, so while a ship was unloading cargo in port the captain would try and secure another cargo for another destination. This meant that there were frequent delays and ships might travel only part-full of cargo. William Burrell travelled widely all over the word and established a system of agents who would secure the cargoes prior to the ships arriving in port. This massively increased the efficiency and profitability of the operation.

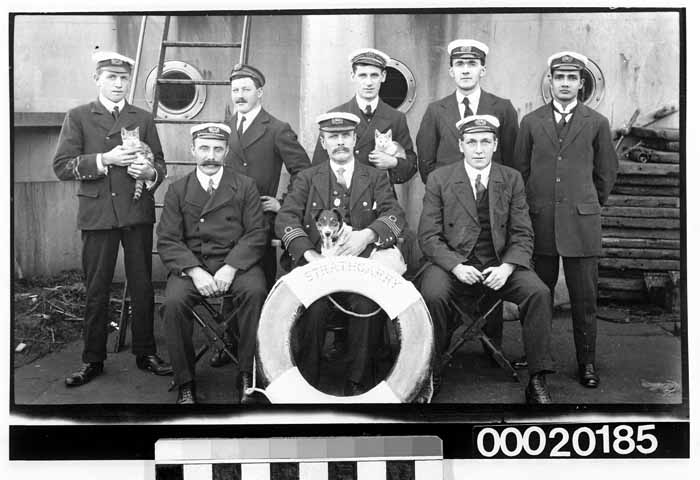
Crew of the Burrell & Son ship Strathgarry.

With the brothers in charge of the company it rapidly expanded both the size and number of ships it operated. William had a great commercial mind and was not afraid of taking risks. In 1894 they bought 17 ships when there was a major depression in the shipping trade. This meant they could acquire the ships very cheaply. When trade picked up a few years later he sold the entire fleet. Between 1900 and 1905 the firm did not own ships but acted as agents and brokers. When the shipping market entered another severe depression he ordered an entire new fleet at rock-bottom prices. Between 1905 and 1911 he acquired a total of 32 new ships, all of a standard design. This made Burrell & Son one of the world's largest and most innovative tramp shipping companies, with nearly 2 per cent of the world's oceangoing tramp ships. Most other tramp ship companies operated 5 or less ships.

Each ship was operated as a single-ship company. Shareholders included prominent Scottish businessmen and Burrell family members, including William Burrell's wife, Constance. A particularly large number of investors were women.

== Shipbuilding ==
Burrell & Son operated two shipbuilding yards. A small yard on the Forth & Clyde Canal at Hamiltonhill built barges, lighters and small coasters, including the Ina MacTavish. It operated from 1875 to around 1907. A larger yard operated from the Lower Woodyard in Dumbarton from 1881 to 1885. This yard built larger cargo vessels for the Burrell & Son shipping line and for other customers. It closed during a harsh recession in Clyde shipbuilding and never re-opened.

== Closure ==
During the First World War, when demand for shipping was intense he again sold virtually the entire fleet, selling the ships for three times what they had cost new. After the war Burrell & Son owned only one ship, the Strathlorne, which they operated until 1930. They continued to act as agents and brokers during this period. There is speculation that they intended to buy again after the war, but the market did not fall as low or as quickly as they had anticipated. When George Burrell died in 1927 Sir William was left on his own, with no son to follow on in business. With art collecting his main priority, the business dwindled and was finally closed down in 1939.
