= Hunger Hill =

Hunger Hill may refer to:

- Hunger Hill, Cheshire, England
- Hunger Hill, Greater Manchester, England
- Hunger Hill, Lancashire, England, a village in the parish of Wrightington

== See also ==
- Hungry Hill (disambiguation)
