= Hutton, Scottish Borders =

Village in Scottish Borders, Scotland

Coordinates: 55.77°N 02.15°W

Hutton
- Location within the Scottish Borders
- OS grid reference: NT9154
- Council area: Scottish Borders
- Lieutenancy area: Berwickshire
- Country: Scotland
- Sovereign state: United Kingdom
- Post town: BERWICK-UPON-TWEED
- Postcode district: TD15
- Dialling code: 01289
- Police: Scotland
- Fire: Scottish
- Ambulance: Scottish
- UK Parliament: Berwickshire, Roxburgh and Selkirk
- Scottish Parliament: Ettrick, Roxburgh and Berwickshire

Hutton is a small village in the Scottish Borders region of Scotland. Historically part of Berwickshire, it is a traditional, country village surrounded by farmland.

== Locality ==
Hutton lies one mile west of Paxton and two miles west of the border with Northumberland. Its closest market towns are Duns and Berwick-upon-Tweed.

== The village ==
The village hall was recently redeveloped and is used for social events. Hutton Primary School was closed in June 2005 after numbers fell to 15 pupils, on the basis of cost. The village, however, thrives, with a local church, park and friendly traditional atmosphere.

== Hutton Church ==
The Church at Hutton was dedicated by David de Bernham who was the Bishop of St Andrews on 6 April 1243. In 1652 seating was installed within the Parish Church, it is thought that it was the original church that had the seats installed. Before the seating was installed members of the congregation brought their own seats. Between the years of 1655 and 1660 Hutton Old Parish Church underwent repairs which included the addition of a gallery on the west side of the church and the roof being re-thatched.

In 1765 a new church was built to replace Hutton Old Parish Church. The new Church had seating for 400 people. The church had an earthen floor, un-plastered walls no ceiling and a thatched roof. A paved floor was laid in 1791 along with the plastering of the walls and ceiling. This church was demolished in 1834. At this time the church was said to be in a state of disrepair bordering on ruinous.

The present Church, built in 1835 by Ignatius Bonomi, is an impressive Romanesque Revival edifice inspired by Norham Church (where Bonomi also worked).

The bell bears the following inscription:

SOLI . DEO . GLORIA . IOHANNES . BURGERHUYS . ME . FECIT . 1661 .

Churchyard - rather overgrown and atmospheric, with mainly 18th- and 19th-century memorials.

Noteworthy:

- James Frisken, 1712, a full-length portrait surrounded by angels' heads and memento mori
- John Burn, 1733, a full-length portrait with open book
- Hutton Hall (castle) Burial Vault, north-west of the church, thought to be 17th-century

The former manse, Antrim House, sits north-west of the church (John Lessels 1876).

Constance, Lady Burrell financed the erection of a new parish church hall in 1931.

== History ==
When the false warning of Napoleon's invasion in 1804 was sent out from the beacon station at Hume Castle, the volunteers from the district made Hutton their rallying-point, and spent a night under arms in the old church.

In more recent history it became popular with Polish soldiers after they were posted to nearby Winfield camp in World War II. After demobilization some continued to live in the village.

Traditional:

Hutton for old wives,

Broadmeadows for swine,

Paxton for drucken wives

And salmon sae fine.

Crossrig for lint and woo'

Spittal for kale,

Sunwick for cakes and cheese

And lasses for sale.

== Notable people ==
- John Blair (1849-1934), Scottish landscape artist, was born there.
- Andrew Forman (1465-1521), Archbishop of St Andrews.
- Shipping magnate and philanthropist Sir William Burrell owned nearby Hutton Castle, and died there in 1958.
- Dudley Marjoribanks, 1st Baron Tweedmouth bought Hutton Hall estate in 1876.
- The famous Wojtek (soldier bear) was stationed in Hutton during World War II.
- Sir William and Constance, Lady Burrell attended the church.

== See also ==
- Hutton Castle
- Paxton House
- James Hutton
