= Hunston =

Hunston may refer to:

- Hunston, Suffolk
- Hunston, West Sussex
