= Constance Burrell =

Scottish art collector (1875–1961)

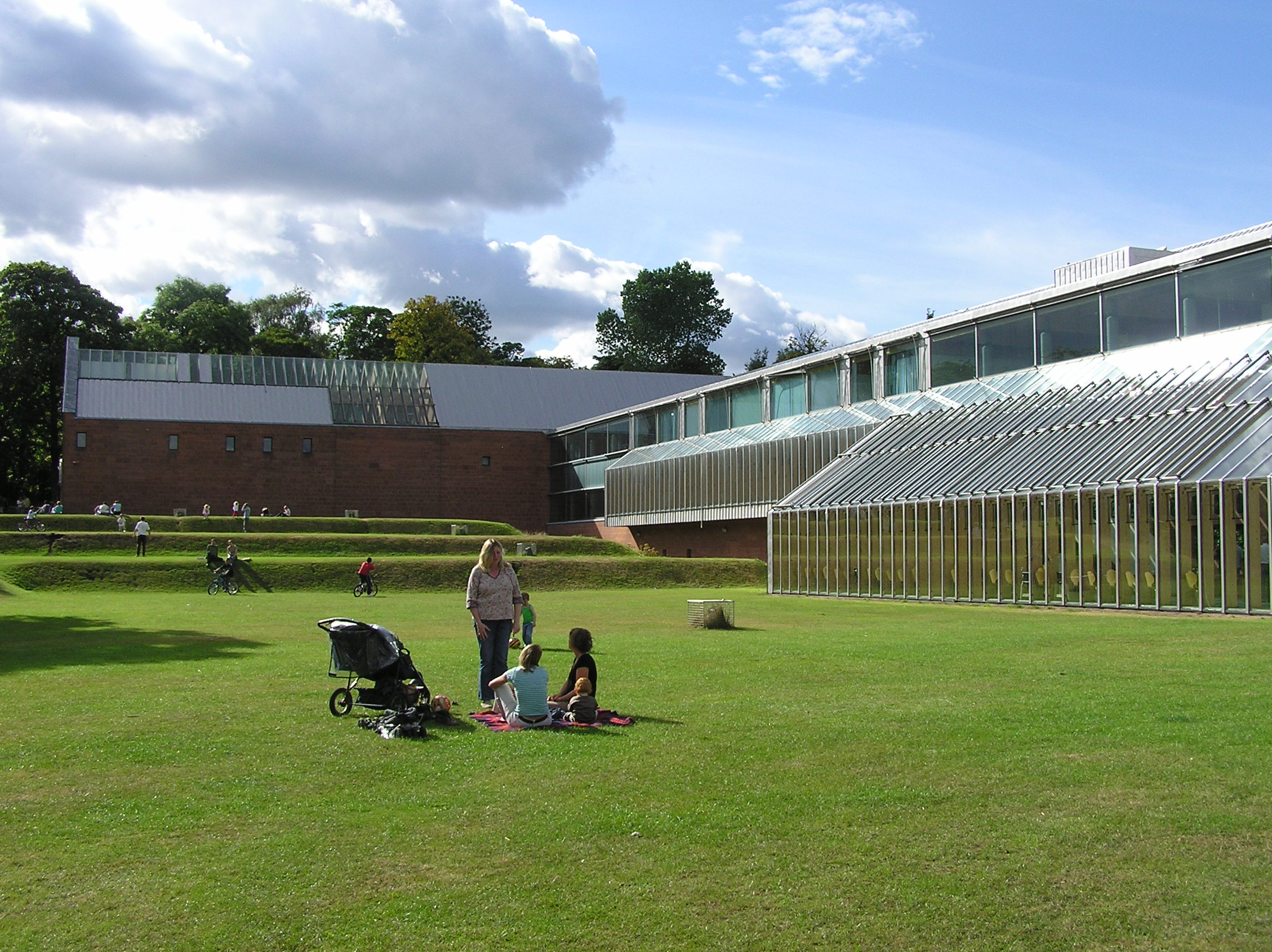
The Burrell Collection, Glasgow

Constance Mary Lockhart, Lady Burrell (née Mitchell; 1875–1961) was a Scottish businesswoman, art collector and philanthropist. She was married to Glasgow ship owner and art collector Sir William Burrell. Their collection is displayed at the Burrell Collection museum in Glasgow.

== Biography ==
Constance Mary Lockhart Mitchell was born in 1875 in Hamilton, Lanarkshire. She was the daughter of the leading merchant and shipowner James Lockhart Mitchell. By 1881 her family had moved to a fashionable townhouse at 10 Great Western Terrace, Glasgow. When her father died in 1893, she inherited a large part of his fortune.

On 19 September 1901, she married the prominent Glasgow ship owner and art collector William Burrell. They were married at the Westbourne United Free Church, Glasgow. They set up home at 8 Great Western Terrace where they had one child, Marion, born on 6 August 1902.

In 1927, they moved to Hutton Castle in Berwickshire. When William Burrell was knighted in 1927, she became known as Constance, Lady Burrell.

== Business Interests ==
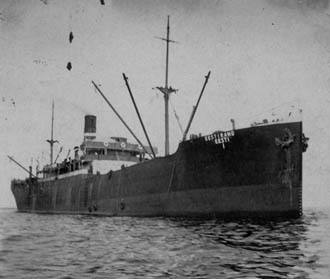
This ship was built as the SS Strathardle in 1910. Constance Burrell owned 5 shares in the Strathardle Steam Ship Co. Ltd.

Constance was a major investor in the Burrell & Son shipping company. She held shares in most of the ships built after 1904 and was one of the principal proposers in the establishment of all but two of the 32 single-ship companies managed by Burrell & Son. She acquired additional shares following the death of her mother in law, Isabella Burrell in 1912. She was accused of acting on her husband's behalf in this sale, but the court decreed that she had acted on her own behalf, using her own estate and that it was her own business decision.

After William and Constance moved to Hutton Castle the estate was divided into individual private limited companies. Constance was appointed chairman of the three companies. The Hutton Estate Company Ltd was the largest, with a capital of £16,100. The Blackburn Estate Company had a capital of £8,100 and the Whiterig Estate Company £6,100.

At the time of her death in 1961 she was described as a property owner and her estate was valued at £42,542.

== Art Collecting ==
Constance shared William's love of art. She grew up in a house where art was appreciated and later started collecting in her own right. She was particularly interested in textiles, especially lace.

In 1917 she lent some lace items to an exhibition of antique furniture, tapestries and 'allied domestic arts' that Robert Lorimer had organised in Edinburgh for the aid of Edenhall Hostel in Kelso, for limbless sailors and soldiers. In 1934 she lent an old Venetian Reticella work chalice veil made in the late 17th century to an exhibition of old silver and lace in Hawick Town Hall in aid of the Scottish Women's Rural Institute.

Her collection was later assimilated into the overall Burrell Collection. The two shared a passion for collecting and Constance played an active role in developing the collection. In his will Burrell was very particular in stating: 'I have had the benefit of my wife's help in many ways including financial help and have received from her the greatest assistance and most wholehearted support in forming the collection . . . it is my desire that it be distinctly understood that the entire gift is from my wife and myself and that her name shall always be associated with mine and shall receive full acknowledgement in all official literature relating to the collection'.

In the years after Sir William's death, Constance continued to keep an eye on auction catalogues for potential additions. She was very knowledgeable about art and antiquities and used her expert judgement to assess the suitability of items proposed for purchase by the museum, rejecting some items on the grounds of quality, date, or their appeal to her and Sir William's taste.

== Charitable Work ==
Constance was greatly interested in matters relating to health and was actively involved in a variety of charitable causes. Her interest in social and medical affairs can be seen in her membership of the Berwickshire Committee of the National Society for the Prevention of Cruelty to Children and she later became vice-president of the Chirnside and District Nursing Association. This was a local branch of the British Nurses Association, which united nurses who sought professional registration. She also fundraised for the Scottish Children's League of Pity, which was affiliated with the Scottish Society for the Prevention of Cruelty to Children. She also became chair of the local Red Cross Society.

In 1928 she offered a gift of £10,000 to purchase one gramme of radium for the Glasgow Royal Cancer Hospital. This initiative came through the persuasion of Sir George Beatson, head of the hospital and one of the country's leading oncologists. Her gift enabled the establishment of the Glasgow and West of Scotland Radium Institute in 1930, now known as the Beatson Cancer Research Institute.

She also paid for the building of a new parish church hall in Hutton village, Berwickshire. At the opening ceremony in 1931 William Burrell made the gift on Constance's behalf, stating that handing over the hall to the parish was 'a great pleasure to his wife, and she hoped that the hall would prove not only useful, but a joy to themselves and all their neighbours'. The Rev. D. S. Leslie, chairman of the hall, responded to the gift by saying that it was one of the happiest moments of his life to receive 'the most generous gift of such a beautiful hall'. Every year thereafter Constance hosted a Christmas party in the hall for the parishioners, with lively entertainment, refreshments and presents for the children.

In 1944 she and Sir William gifted their collection to the city of Glasgow.

== Health Concerns ==
Constance did not have an easy birth and she suffered terribly as a result. She endured great physical pain and developed what we now call postnatal depression. A couple of years later Constance had to have an operation on her kidney and again had a long and difficult convalescence. As a result, Constance was to suffer physical and mental ill health for the rest of her life.

She later suffered from phlebitis, an inflammation of the veins and in 1932 she underwent a series of operations which took a long time to recover from. She often travelled to continental Europe for periodic rest cures. As William Burrell explained: 'warm weather is my wife's best friend and cold her worst'. During the 1930s they regularly spent the winter months in Jamaica.

Prolonged ill health compromised Constance socially and after years of declining health, she died of heart failure on 15 August 1961 at Hutton Castle, aged 85. She is buried in Largs.
