= Hungry Hill (disambiguation) =

Hungry Hill may refer to:

== Places ==
- Hungry Hill, a hill in County Cork, Ireland
- A neighborhood in Springfield, Massachusetts, United States

== Arts and entertainment ==
- Hungry Hill (novel), a 1943 novel by Daphne du Maurier
- Hungry Hill (film), a 1947 film adaptation of the novel

== Other uses ==
- Battle of Hungry Hill, an 1855 battle between the United States Army and militia against the Rogue River Indians

== See also ==
- Hunger Hill (disambiguation)
