= SS Ina Mactavish =

Coordinates: 55.360°N 1.597°W

History

United Kingdom
- Name: SS Ina Mactavish
- Builder: Burrell & Son, Glasgow
- Launched: 1886
- Homeport: Glasgow
- Fate: Wrecked 17 October 1907; off Amble, Northumberland; NU256074

General characteristics
- Tonnage: 107 tons
- Crew: 4

SS Ina Mactavish was a small coaster that was wrecked in 1907 with the loss of two lives.

== History ==
Ina Mactavish was built by Burrell & Son of Glasgow in 1866. She spent the next twenty years as a coasting lighter before sinking in 1906. She was bought by Clyde Salvage Company for £175, and another £800 was spent lengthening and repairing her. This work was carried out by the Ardrossan Dry Dock and Shipping Company. In February 1907, she was sold to John Wilson of Leith for £1,450.

== Wreck ==
Ina Mactavish left South Shields on the River Tyne on the morning of 16 October 1907 bound for Aberdeen, laden with 130 tons of lime. At about 22:00, the ship's condenser broke down as a nut had come off the suction valve. Around 06:00 on 17 October, the engines were stopped because a rope had become entangled around the propeller. It was decided to beach the ship, and shortly before 09:00 the ship grounded to the south of Birling Car Rock in Alnmouth Bay. It took until 15:00 for the Alnmouth lifeboat to rescue the survivors. By this time the ship's engineer and cook had both drowned. For their part in trying to rescue the crew, P. Holbert, chief boatman of coastguard, Amble; A. Barton, Police Sergeant, of Amble and J. Helm, police constable of Warkworth were each awarded a Sea Gallantry Medal.

== Aftermath ==
The wreck was towed into Amble, and later sold off for £515.

== Inquiry ==
An inquiry was held by the Board of Trade at the Moot Hall, Newcastle upon Tyne in December 1907 and February 1908. The master of the vessel was found not to have caused the accident, but was reprimanded for not sending out a distress signal when the ship's engines were stopped. It was also noted that there was a long delay between the wreck being observed and the lifeboat being launched.
