= John Blair (painter) =

Scottish painter (c.1849–1934)

- Born: c.1849 Hutton, Scottish Borders
- Died: 13 October 1934; Edinburgh
- Resting place: Liberton Cemetery, Edinburgh
- Education: Trustees' Academy
- Known for: Painting

John Blair (c. 1849 – 13 October 1934) was a Scottish painter, predominantly of watercolour landscapes. Of humble beginnings in Berwickshire, he moved to Edinburgh to study and spent the rest of his life there. His paintings mainly reflect the landscapes around him, both of urban settings and also of the castles, sea and lochs of the Borders, although he also painted figures and still lifes. As well as his original work, his paintings were viewed by a wide audience in the form of picture postcards, book endpapers and illustrations.

== Life and career ==
Blair was born in the Berwickshire village of Hutton, in about 1849. His family background would not seem to have favoured his choice of career, which suggests a certain degree of ability in order to make it succeed, nor perhaps predicted him leaving an estate of £3418 4s 6d on his death in 1934. His father's occupation is listed on various census records/official documents as "agricultural labourer", "salmon fisher" and "gardener". His parents Alexander and Elisabeth Blair (née Allan), together with their family of 5 children, moved around the area; the census recorded them in Hutton in 1851 and in Coldstream in 1861.

Somewhere in this period, Blair attended the nearby Sunnyside school at Milne Graden, and it is there that local landowner David Milne-Home befriended him. This resulted in Milne-Home arranging for Blair to train at the Trustees Academy School of Art (a forerunner of Edinburgh College of Art), where Blair studied under Charles Hodder.

By 1871 Blair had left home for South Leith, where he lodged with Francis and Clementina Brown at 8 Primrose Street, giving his occupation as "art student".

He first exhibited in the Annual Exhibition of the Royal Scottish Academy in 1870, with paintings entitled "Newhaven", "Fawside Castle, Edinburgh" and "Bait gatherers". He went on to exhibit some 83 paintings in the RSA Annual Exhibitions until 1920.

He is also said to have exhibited at the Dudley Gallery (London), Glasgow Institute of Fine Art, Walker Art Gallery, Manchester City Art Gallery, Royal Hiberian Academy, The Royal Institute of Painters in Water Colours and the Berwick Arts Club, and was a member of the Society of Scottish Artists.

Whilst a student, Blair was awarded several medals of national standing – in 1870 The Scotsman referred to “the silver medal, gained by Mr John Blair in the male school” as one of the 20 silver medals awarded that year across the 103 Government schools. Then in 1872 the Berwickshire News reported that Blair had been awarded both a gold and a silver medal: "We understand that the Edinburgh Schools of Arts for young men has this year been successful….. in the national competition of students recently held at London. The gold medal was awarded to John Blair, a native of Paxton, for the best shaded study of an antique figure, also a silver medal for a study in water colour. This is the third silver medal taken by him, and the only instance in the Edinburgh School in which a student has carried off a gold and silver medal in the same year."

By the 1881 census he titled himself "artist landscape" and was living in Leith.

Blair married his wife Margaret Hume in 1899, with their respective ages 48 and 39. They lived for some time at 37 Argyle Place, Morningside where Blair stated his profession as "landscape artist" and "Painter (artist)". His obituary in the Berwickshire News stated that his "failing health in late years prevented him using the brush" and this may well explain why he no longer has any paintings exhibited at the Royal Scottish Academy after 1920.

He died on 13 October 1934 at his home, 121 Dalkeith Road, Edinburgh, of "Cerebral haemorrhage 2 days" and "Senility", at the age of 84 years. His funeral, according to The Berwickshire News, was conducted by the Rev. W. Roy Sanderson, St Giles Cathedral, and he was buried in Liberton Cemetery, Edinburgh. In addition to family members, one of his pall-bearers was the artist Hector Chalmers RSA.

== Works ==
=== Illustrations and picture postcards ===
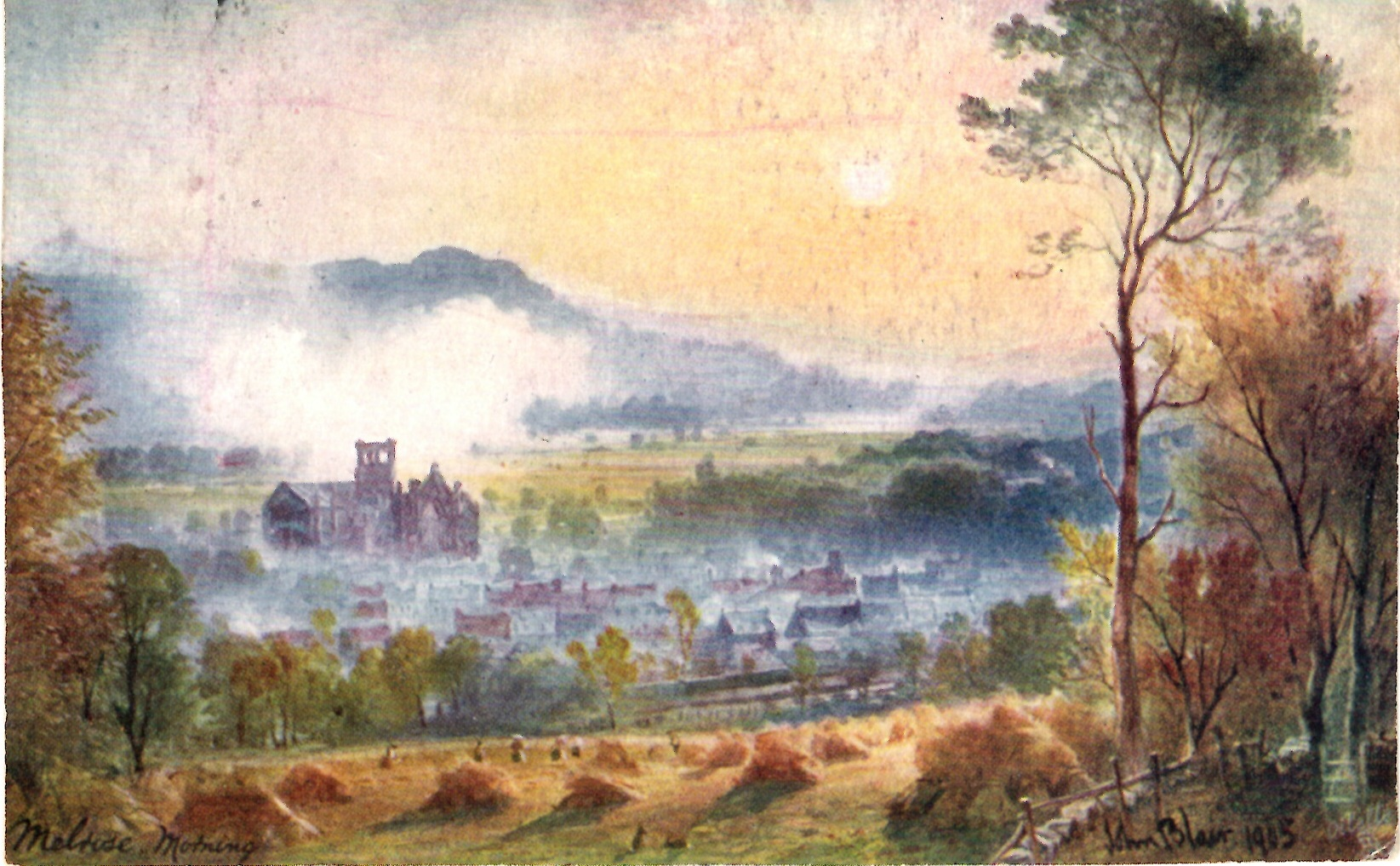
Postcard painting of Melrose morning 1905 by John Blair

There are numerous works by Blair which continue to come up in auction sales. In addition, his works were used to illustrate a number of publications, and over 80 of them appear as Tuck's Post Cards (Raphael Tuck & Sons). Known publications in which Blair's illustrations were used:

- The Birds of Berwickshire Volume 1 by George Muirhead.
- The Birds of Berwickshire Volume 2 by George Muirhead.
- A Summer in Skye by Alexander Smith.
- Poems of Wordsworth, Nimmo's Clyde Classics series.
- Coloured endpapers for:
  - Favourite essays of Emerson
  - Poems of love by Ella Wheeler Wilcox.
  - Poems of Matthew Arnold
  - Selected poems and songs of Burns
  - Songs and ballads of Scott 1911

=== Museum collections ===
A few of his works are to be found in museum collections, as follows:

- Minneapolis Institute of Art – Ben Venue and the Trossachs.
- Trinity House, Leith – Portrait in oil of Edward Brown (d. 1801) copied from a watercolour by Daniel Orme.
- Museum of New Zealand – Edinburgh from Samson's Ribbs.
- Stirling Smith Art Gallery and Museum – Stirling Castle from Bannockburn.
- Sunderland Museum and Winter Gardens – The Tweed above Norham Castle, Northumberland.
- Edinburgh Librairies and Museums and Galleries - Advocate's Close.

In addition, Edinburgh Libraries mounted an exhibition in February 2020 of 13 lithographs of Edinburgh and Midlothian taken from watercolours of John Blair. The original exhibition of watercolours was held in 1892 at the gallery of Aitken, Dott and Sons in Castle Street, Edinburgh. The Berwickshire News carried a review which noted that "Mr Blair’s work is really most successful; a labour of love, its results are as valuable from the purely artistic as from the historical point of view; and the care which he has taken to select typical and striking points of view renders the value of the collection to the future historian of Edinburgh very great".

=== Royal Scottish Academy Annual Exhibitions ===
The following works by Blair were exhibited at Annual Exhibitions of the Royal Scottish Academy between 1870 and 1920.

Year	RSA Catalogue Number	Description
1870	177	Newhaven
1870	181	Fawside Castle, Edinburgh in the distance
1870	242	Bait gatherers
1871	941	Peace and plenty
1871	944	The Calton Hill from Lochend Road, Leith
1871	1006	Study from still life, fruit, etc.
1871	1051	A dead sparrow
1871	1093	Study of a bird's nest, etc. – from nature
1872	775	Old shed at Cramond – sketch
1872	846	On the Esk at Dalkeith
1872	875	Still life – study
1872	121	Princes St, Edinburgh
1873	761	Village of Old Ladykirk, Berwickshire
1873	926	A quiet nook near Ladykirk, Berwickshire
1873	980	Study in still life
1874	771	Old bridge, Berwick-on-Tweed
1874	934	Melrose Abbey
1874	948	Greens Harbour, Berwick-on-Tweed
1874	993	On the Tweed, near Melrose
1875	802	Melrose Abbey from the east
1875	988	Archway in Melrose Abbey
1876	64	A country byre
1876	174	Taking a rest
1876	528	After dinner
1877	737	Tibbie's Bible
1877	796	A country burnside
1877	893	The reaper's dinner
1878	149	The sculptor
1878	330	A November morning
1878	534	The ploughman's bairns
1879	37	Preparing for sport
1879	302	A turnip field
1879	356	Early winter
1879	562	Reapers at work
1880	274	Summer
1880	444	Autumn morning – after rain
1880	544	Breakfast time
1880	636	Tyne
1880	756	The country postman
1881	363	Honeysuckle
1881	393	A quiet nook
1882	80	Study of cattle
1882	143	The mother's lesson
1882	636	Grandfather's pet
1882	775	Edge of the wood
1883	92	A deaf old man
1883	210	The old fiddler
1883	1029	Salmon fishers mending nets, on the Tweed
1883	1077	The ploughman's orra time
1884	915	A visit to the henhouse
1884	917	A country cobbler
1884	929	Village of Heul, near Rotterdam
1885	112	"The rain it raineth every day With heigh ho the wind and the rain"
1885	123	The quiet of evening
1885	289	The old fiddler
1885	387	The Sunday reading
1885	439	Sorting the hooks
1885	588	The village of Horndean – rainy effect
1885	621	Gathering brushwood
1885	752	Resting in the shade
1885	798	The Pease Glen – moonlight
1885	890	Playmates
1885	689	Snow in autumn
1885	924	The little boat builders
1885	995	The Bible lesson
1886	689	His morning chapter
1886	1025	The bramble gatherer
1886	1141	Dinner time
1887	637	"I've seen Tweed's silver streams glittering in the sunny beams..."
1887	110	Waiting to be shod
1887	190	Noonday
1887	275	Jubilee illuminations – Edinburgh from the Calton Hill
1887	620	Jubilee bonfire on Arthur's Seat
1887	713	Pen & ink drawings for vignettes to Birds of Berwickshire by George Muirhead
1887	801	Pen & ink drawings for vignettes to Birds of Berwickshire by George Muirhead
1888	695	The Tweed at Fishwick
1888	910	The heat of the day
1889	394	The Tweed
1889	835	Wind and rain
1889	960	Grannie's lesson
1890	412	The pedlar
1890	472	At Brig o' Turk
1890	560	In Glenfinlas
1892	662	St Abbs village, Berwickshire coast
1893	?	Interior at Lauder – study
1894	457	On the canal at Aston, Staffordshire
1895	519	Gipsies – bird catching
1896	597	East coast fisherman
1897	579	On the Fife coast
1897	605	Stormy weather, St Monance
1897	660	The Ochils, near Dollar
1898	648	St Monance
1898	786	At Brig o' Turk
1899	608	Sunday by the sea – St Monance
1900	742	Stormy weather, Crail
1901	2	On the Tweed near Norham
1901	692	The coming storm, St Abbs
1903	116	Eyemouth – squally weather
1904	125	The South Queich, Kinross
1904	134	Loch Leven
1905	113	In Strathearn
1907	24	On the Fife coast
1907	54	Kinnoul Hill
1908	38	The boats at Ferryden
1908	49	The Grampians from Seck Bridge
1909	20	Largo Bay
1909	94	Lundin Links
1910	83	Near Montrose
1910	88	Flodden Field
1912	395	At Drommochty
1913	295	Changing pasture
1913	298	Haymaking, Brig o' Turk
1915	471	The Pentlands from Duddingstone
1916	503	Milne's Court, Lawnmarket
1917	467	Valley of the Tay, near Dunkeld
1918	497	On the Fife coast
1918	621	Harvesting on the Borders
1919	616	On the Whitadder
1919	695	Near Berwick
1920	665	At Whitsome, Berwickshire
