= Hugus =

Coordinates: 50.25203°N 5.11971°W

Hugus: Cornish: Ughgos
- Location within Cornwall
- OS grid reference: SW774435
- Shire county: Cornwall
- Region: South West
- Country: England
- Sovereign state: United Kingdom
- Post town: Truro
- Postcode district: TR3
- Police: Devon and Cornwall
- Fire: Cornwall
- Ambulance: South Western

Hugus (Cornish: Ughgos) is a hamlet in west Cornwall, England, United Kingdom. It is three miles (5 km) west of Truro. It is in the civil parish of Kea

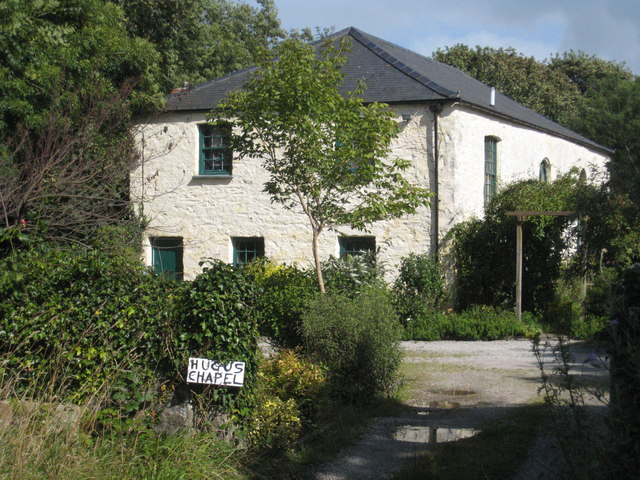
Hugus Chapel
