= Hutton Castle =

Castle in Scottish Borders, Scotland

Coordinates: 55.7875°N 2.1784°W

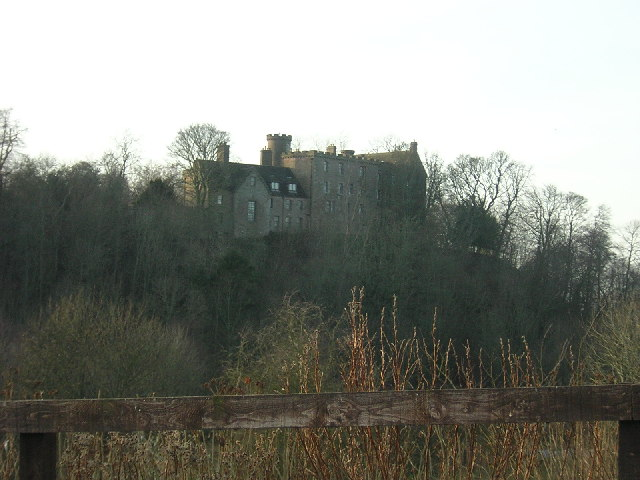
Hutton Castle, viewed from the east across the Whiteadder

Hutton Castle is located in the Scottish Borders, overlooking the Whiteadder Water. It stands 2.5 kilometres (1.6 mi) southeast of Chirnside and 11 kilometres (6.8 mi) west of Berwick-on-Tweed. It has also been known as Hatton Hall and Hutton Hall.

== History ==
Originally a property of the Homes of Wedderburn, Hutton was probably built in the 16th century, but may include much older fabric. It was the seat of the Johnstons of Hilton from c.1620 until the early 19th century. From 1876 the castle was owned by Dudley Marjoribanks, 1st Baron Tweedmouth. It was partially ruinous in the late 19th century.

Hutton Hall was attacked during the war of the Rough Wooing by Harry Eure, son of Lord Eure in September 1544. In July 1588, the English diplomat Robert Bowes organised a meeting at Hutton Hall to deliver £2000 in gold to Sir John Carmichael as a subsidy paid to James VI of Scotland.

=== Sir William Burrell ===
Hutton was purchased in 1916 by Sir William Burrell, wealthy Glaswegian shipping merchant and art collector. Burrell commissioned Robert Lorimer to prepare designs for the restoration and expansion of the building, but the two men failed to agree on proposals. In 1926 the north wing was constructed to designs by Reginald Fairlie. The following year Burrell was able to move in, and lived at Hutton with his art collection until his death in 1958.

Burrell and his wife Constance gifted their collection to the city of Glasgow in 1944, stipulating that, among other things, several of the rooms at Hutton Castle should be recreated for the display of the artefacts. In 1983, when the present Burrell Collection building was completed in Glasgow's Pollok Park, replicas of the dining room, the drawing room and the hall of the castle were installed, based on the photographs & detail surveys carried out by Draughting Associates some 10 years or so earlier.

=== Later history ===
Meanwhile, Hutton Castle itself remained unoccupied. In the late 1990s it was once again restored as a dwelling. It is a category B listed building.
