= Robert Hungate =

Pioneer of anaerobic microbial ecology

Robert E. Hungate
- Born: March 2, 1906; Cheney, WA
- Died: September 21, 2004 (aged 98); Davis, CA
- Education: Stanford University
- Known for: Rumen microbiology Anaerobic culture methods Hungate tubes
- Spouse: Alice Elizabeth Hungate (née Wolcott)
- Scientific career
- Fields: Anaerobic microbiology
- Doctoral advisor: C. B. van Niel

Robert Edward Hungate (1906 – 2004) was a pioneering American microbial ecologist who developed the first techniques for the culturing of anaerobic microbes in his study of the bovine rumen.

== Early life ==
Hungate was born on March 2, 1906, in Cheney, Washington, where his father taught biology at the State Normal School at Cheney (now Eastern Washington University) for 46 years. Hungate's father was strongly influenced by his brother-in-law, Charles Piper, and encouraged Hungate's interest in the ecology of Eastern Washington through outings in the local area. Hungate graduated from Cheney Normal in 1924, and served as principal of the Spokane Indian Reservation's elementary school for a year, followed by another two years teaching in Sprague, Washington. He entered Stanford University with the goal of teaching biology at the high school level, but abandoned his plan after his first quarter at Stanford due to his dislike of pedagogy courses and his fellow education students, and instead completed an A.B. in biology magna cum laude in 1929.

Hungate had not yet selected a research topic for his Ph.D. before taking C. B. van Niel's first course at Hopkins Marine Station in 1931. Hungate was the only student, and Van Niel's intimate instruction—Van Niel sat beside him at a table and sketched illustrations on a yellow notepad, which Hungate kept at the end of the lecture—was a turning point in Hungate's scientific career. At Van Niel's suggestion, Hungate selected the symbiotic bacteria of termites as his thesis topic, investigating their role in cellulose digestion. However, he was unsuccessful in his attempts to isolate cellulolytic bacteria from the termite gut because culturing techniques for anaerobic bacteria had not yet been developed, a result that spurred his continued efforts to find methods to do so after he received his Ph.D. in 1935.

== Work and discoveries ==
=== Termite biology ===
Hungate continued his work on the biology of termites after his appointment as lecturer in the Zoology department of the University of Texas, Austin. Hungate first identified the production of H_{2} as a fermentation product in worker termites, and undertook a study of nitrogen fixation in experimental termite colonies.

=== Rumen microbiology ===
==== The "Hungate" method ====
While investigating the role of cellulolytic protozoa in the rumen of cattle, Hungate isolated a colony of Clostridium cellobioparum, but the difficulty in observing the cellulose clearings they produced in shake tubes spurred him to develop a culturing method using thin agar layers in roll tubes.

==== The "Hungate" tubes ====
Anaerobic culture Hungate tubes are gas tight and autoclavable. They allow to establish and to maintain strict anoxic conditions required to culture anaerobic microorganisms. An Hungate culture tube consists of three parts: A cylindric borosilicate glass tube (typically ~ 10 mm ⌀ × ~ 125 mm length), a gas-tight non-toxic butyl rubber septum, and a screw cap. The rubber septum can be easily punctured with a syringe needle to avoid any air ingress inside the tube for preserving anaerobic conditions. The atmosphere inside the tube is flushed several times with an inert gas, such as N_{2} or argon, until all atmospheric oxygen has been removed. The tube can be easily inoculated and microbial samples retrieved after growth using a syringe with a sharp needle.

When Hungate tubes are filled with an opaque agar media, it displays zones of clearance upon successful anaerobic microorganisms cultivation.

==== Washington State University, Pullman ====
At the end of the World War II in 1945, Hungate accepted the offer to join the Bacteriology Department at Washington State College (now Washington State University). Hungate’s laboratory at Washington State University was the first to isolate methanogens using H_{2} – CO_{2} as an energy source.

==== University of California, Davis ====
Hungate accepted the appointment as Chairman of the Bacteriology Department, University of California, Davis, in 1956. He held his chairmanship until 1962. Here, Hungate mentored many doctoral students, postdoctoral scholars, and visiting scholars.

== See also ==
- Anaerobic organisms
- Extremophiles

== Selected bibliography ==
- Hungate, Robert E. (October 1934). "The cohesion theory of transpiration". Plant Physiology. 9 (4): 783–794. doi:10.1104/pp.9.4.783. ISSN 0032-0889. PMC 439104. PMID 16652917.
- Hungate, Robert E. (December 1960). "Microbial ecology of the rumen". Bacteriological Reviews. 24 (4): 353–364. ISSN 0005-3678. PMC 441062. PMID 13716827.
- Hungate, Robert Edward (1966). The rumen and its microbes. New York, London: Academic Press. p. 533. ISBN 9780123616500.
