= Burrell Collection =

Art collection in the city of Glasgow, Scotland

Coordinates: 55°49′51″N 4°18′27″W

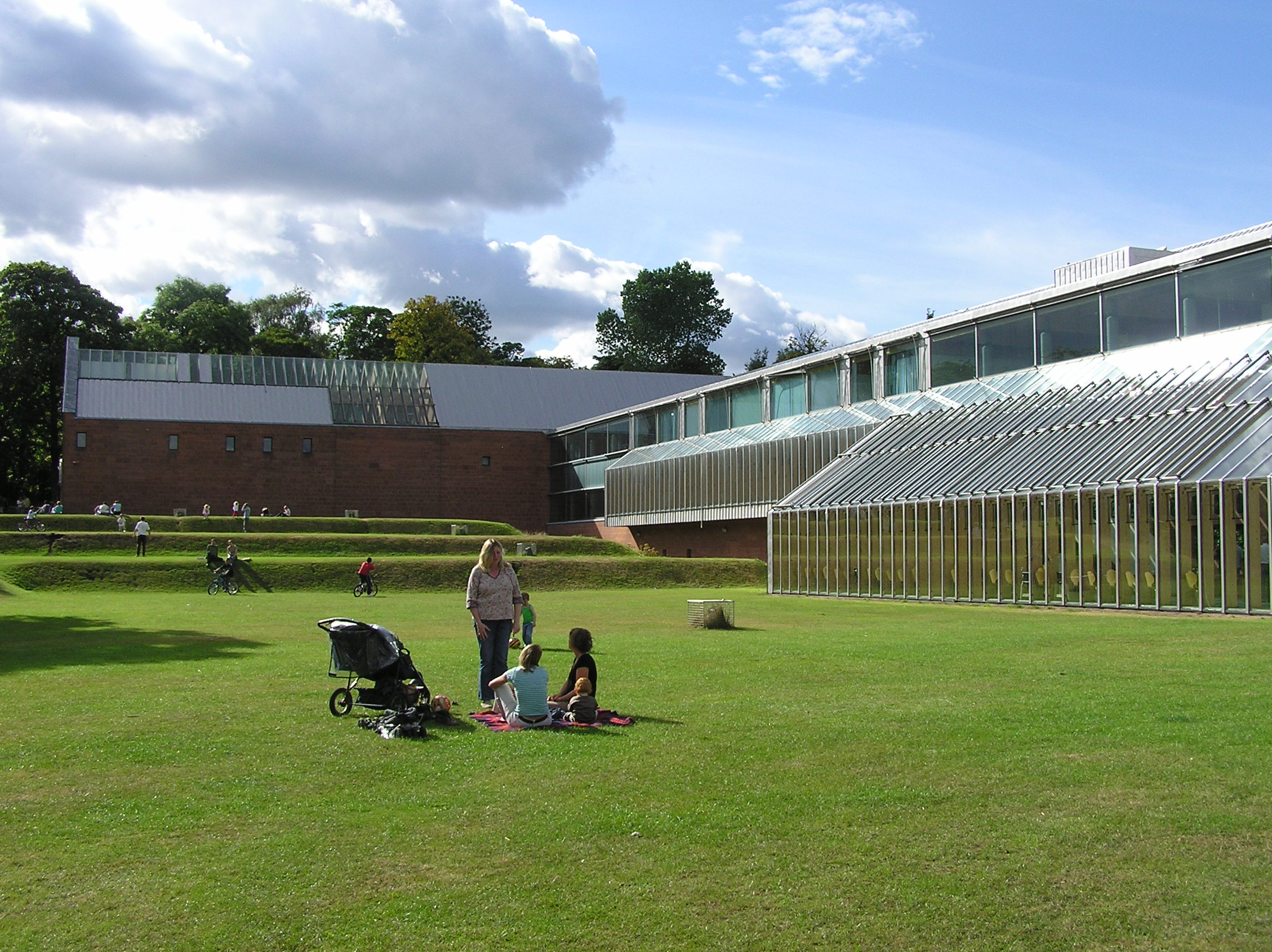

- Location within Glasgow council area
- Established: 1983
- Location: Glasgow, Scotland
- Visitors: 563,446 in 2025
- Website: burrellcollection.com

The Burrell Collection is a museum in Glasgow, Scotland, managed by Glasgow Museums. It houses the art collection of Sir William Burrell and Constance, Lady Burrell. The museum opened in 1983 and reopened on 29 March 2022 following a major refurbishment. It was announced as the winner of the Art Fund Museum of the Year in July 2023.

== History ==
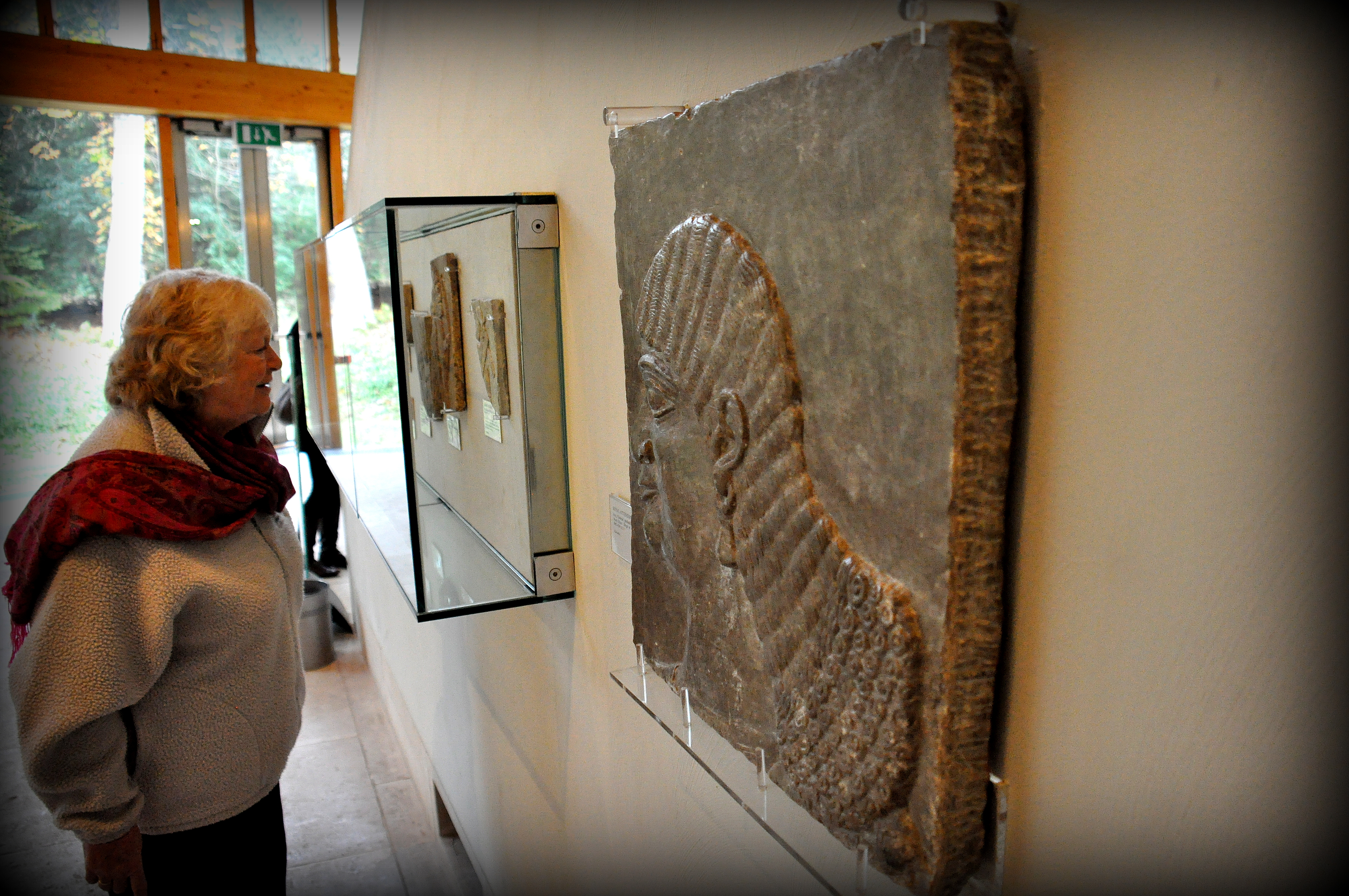
Assyrian Royal Attendant from Nimrud, Mesopotamia

The eclectic collection was acquired over many years by Sir William Burrell, a wealthy Glasgow shipping magnate and art collector, and his wife Constance, Lady Burrell, who then gave it to the city of Glasgow Corporation in 1944. Throughout his collecting career, Burrell lent many of the works in his collection to special exhibitions and for display in museums. Sometime c. 1930, he decided that he was going to donate his entire collection to the public.

Burrell then began the process of finding a home for the remaining 6,000 items. He initially wanted it to go to London, which he saw as the centre of the art world. He approached the Westminster government with the idea that he would leave his collection to the nation as a separate government institution, like the Wallace Collection. Although the government took the offer seriously, it had more pressing wartime priorities. Burrell then approached London County Council with a similar offer. Negotiations got to an advanced stage, but in the end the cost of maintaining the collection proved too much and the offer was declined.

Burrell then turned to Glasgow. He had already gifted 48 paintings and 30 prints to the Kelvingrove Art Gallery and Museum in 1925, and much of his collection was already on semi-permanent display there, particularly the Chinese works. The museum had recently appointed Tom Honeyman as director, a man whom Burrell admired and trusted. His influence was instrumental in Burrell's final decision to offer his collection to the city of Glasgow.

== Finding a home for the collection ==
A memorandum of agreement between William and Constance and the Corporation of Glasgow was signed in April 1944. Burrell had clear intentions regarding the collection's location, contents and display, and the agreement stated that the collection was to be housed by Glasgow Corporation "in a suitable distinct and separated building" that was to be "within four miles [six kilometres] of Killearn, Stirlingshire, and not less than sixteen miles [26 kilometres] from Glasgow Royal exchange."

Burrell donated £450,000 for the construction of a museum for his collection, but finding a suitable site for it was not easy. The city had immediately started making investigations, and by the late 1940s, at least eight different sites were considered. Mugdock Castle Estate, near Milngavie, was seriously considered, even though it was much closer to Glasgow than the stipulated 16 miles (26 km). In 1951, the Dougalston estate, also near Milngavie, was gifted to Glasgow by the widow of a Glasgow shipbuilder on the condition that the Burrell Collection be constructed on the site. Preparations got to an advanced stage, but in 1955, the National Coal Board announced plans to sink a coal mine nearby. All plans for the Burrell Collection were abandoned and the collection remained in storage for many years.

The ideal solution finally arrived with the offer of Pollok House and its estate to the city of Glasgow. This was the ancestral home of the Stirling-Maxwells on the south side of Glasgow. It was only three miles (five kilometres) from the city centre, but its 360-acre (150-hectare) parkland made it an ideal rural setting that was within the spirit of Burrell's ambitions for his museum. After long and protracted negotiations, the government stepped in with financial support of £250,000 for the museum. In 1967, the Pollok estate was transferred to the city, and preparations to build the Burrell Collection finally got underway.

== Building ==
In 1970, an architectural competition was launched to identify a suitable architect for the museum. The competition brief made it clear that whilst the competitors were to comply with Burrell's exacting conditions, they were at liberty to design "a fine modern building" which would make the most out of both the collection and the site. The closing date for the competition for the museum building in 1971 was delayed by a postal strike, allowing time for the eventual winning architect Barry Gasson to complete his entry, designed in collaboration with John Meunier and Brit Andresen, all tutors at Cambridge University's School of Architecture.

As the project progressed, the costs increased, and this jeopardized the museum. Glasgow Corporation approached the government for additional support. The Secretary of State for Scotland promised to meet 50 per cent of the estimated £9.6 million cost in recognition that the Burrell Collection was not just important for Glasgow, but was a national treasure that would benefit the country as a whole.

Construction work commenced on 3 May 1978 and continued over the next five years. The building was influenced by Scandinavian design. The architects used the orientation of the building to bring in as much natural light as possible, while still protecting the vulnerable parts of the collection. The integration of the building, its rural setting, and the collection was central to the architects' thinking, and the way in which the objects were built into the structure ensured that the museum became a part of the collection rather than simply being a space in which Burrell's objects were housed.

The building is L-shaped in plan and is tailored to house and display the collection, with larger pieces such as Romanesque doorways built into the structure, at the same time giving views out into the park over formal grassed areas to the south and into adjacent woodland to the north.

The entrance, through a 16th-century stone archway built into a modern red sandstone gable, leads to a shop and other facilities, then on to a central courtyard under a glazed roof, adjacent to the reconstructions of three rooms from the Burrells' home, Hutton Castle near Berwick-on-Tweed: the wood-panelled drawing room, hall, and dining room complete with their furnishings. Galleries on two levels house various smaller artefacts, over a basement storage level, and at the lower level a restaurant gives views over the lawn to the south.

The museum was opened by Queen Elizabeth II on 21 October 1983. More than a million visitors passed through its doors in the first year, and the Burrell Collection quickly established itself as one of Glasgow's most-loved buildings. It was named as Scotland's second greatest post-war building (after Gillespie, Kidd & Coia's St Peter's Seminary, now derelict) in a poll of architects by Prospect magazine in 2005.

=== Awards for the original building ===
The Burrell Collection received the following awards after it first opened in 1983:

- British Tourism Authority Come to Britain Trophy, 1984
- Building Services Award for Energy Use, 1984,
- National Heritage Scottish Museum of the Year Award, 1985
- UK Museum of the Year Award, 1985
- Sotheby's Award for the best Fine Art Museum, 1985
- Civic Trust Award, 1985
- Eternit Architecture Prize, 1985
- Designer Award, Interior Design Category, 1986
- International Academy of Architecture Gold Award, 1987

The building was awarded A-listed status by Historic Scotland in February 2013 in recognition of its position as one of the country's finest examples of 1970s architectural design.

=== 2016–2022 refurbishment ===
In 2016, the museum was closed for refurbishments. The £68.25 million project aimed to repair the building, make it more sustainable, and increase gallery space. On 29 March 2022, the museum reopened to the public, with King Charles III visiting on 13 October 2022 to officially re-open the venue.

=== Awards following refurbishment ===
The Burrell Collection has received the following awards following the refurbishment in 2022:

- British Construction Industry Awards, 2022, Cultural & Leisure Project of the Year
- British Construction Industry Awards, 2022, Project of the Year Award
- Façade Design and Engineering Awards, 2023, Project of the Year, Refurbishment
- AJ Architecture Awards, 2022, Cultural Award
- AJ Architecture Awards, 2022, Heritage Award
- Cultural Enterprises Awards, 2023, Best shop
- AJ Retrofit Awards, 2023, Cultural and Religious Building (£5 million and over)
- Civic Trust Awards, 2023, Michael Middleton Special Award
- Civic Trust Awards, 2023, Award
- Art Fund Museum of the Year, 2023, Winner
- Scottish Design Awards, 2023, Judges' Grand Prix Award
- Scottish Design Awards, 2023, Gold Award: Design for Good
- Scottish Design Awards, 2023, Gold Award: Architecture: Public Building
- Scottish Design Awards, 2023, Gold Award: Moving Imagery Design
- Scottish Design Awards, 2023, Gold Award: Experiential, Incorporating Audiovisual, Graphic and Object-based Displays
- RIAS Architectural Heritage Award 2024

== Collection ==
Containing over 9,000 objects, the Burrell contains an important collection of medieval art including stained glass and tapestries, oak furniture, medieval weapons and armour, Islamic art, artefacts from ancient Egypt and China, Impressionist works by Degas and Cézanne, modern sculpture and a host of other artefacts from around the world, all collected by Burrell. Paintings from five centuries and artworks spanning six millennia are found in the collection.

=== Chinese art ===
Burrell started collecting Chinese antiques c. 1910. He acquired items from all periods of Chinese history; including Neolithic burial urns, carved jades, porcelain from the Tang dynasty, bronze ritual vessels, earthenware figures, and antique furniture. The collection now includes one of the most significant holdings of Chinese art in the UK.

=== Islamic art ===
Islamic antiques donated by Burrell to the museum include: Hispano-Moresque lustreware, ceramics and carpets from Iran and the Mughal Empire, as well as embroideries and textiles from Turkey and Uzbekistan. One highlight is The Wagner Garden Carpet from 17th century Iran as one of the most remarkable garden carpets to have survived to the present.

=== Medieval art ===
==== Gothic art ====
The museum has a collection of religious art from the medieval period. This includes wood and stone sculptures, wooden church furnishings and architectural fragments. One of these items is the Temple Pyx.

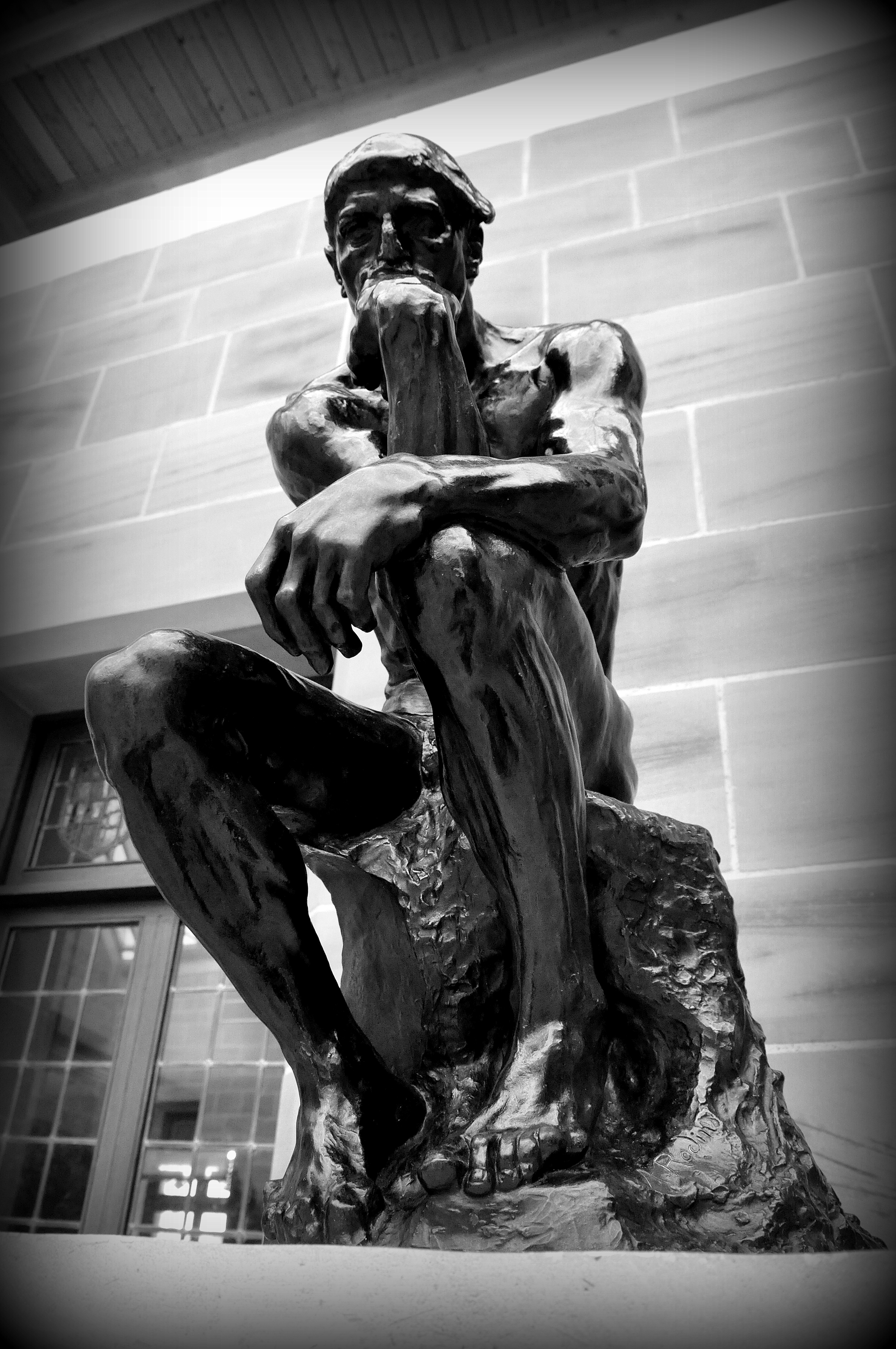
Thinker, Auguste Rodin, 1880 CE

==== Tapestries ====
The collection has over 200 tapestries and carpets.

==== Stained glass ====
The museum is home to more than 700 stained glass panels from across Europe in the collection, including many examples of Gothic, Renaissance, and Romanesque styles. Much of the glass has heraldic motifs.

In 2013, a project was commenced to conserve and research the museum's collection of stained glass from the Carmelite church at Boppard-am-Rhein, Germany. The 34 panels that make up the Burrell collection of Boppard windows have a combined surface area of 14 square metres.

=== French art ===
The collection includes an array of French art from Realist painting to Impressionism, including works by François Bonvin, Eugène Boudin, Jean-Baptiste-Camille Corot, Gustave Courbet, Charles-François Daubigny, Honoré Daumier, Edgar Degas, Henri Fantin-Latour, Édouard Manet and Jean-François Millet.

Burrell had a particular appreciation for Degas and with more than 20 works by the artist, the museum now holds one of the greatest collections of Degas's works in the world.

== Claims for Nazi-looted art ==
During the 1930s and 1940s, many artworks came onto the market as a result of forced auction sales of works belonging to Jewish collectors by the Nazis. Burrell acquired works from a number of dealers during this time. Although he was not aware of it at the time, subsequent research shows that a number of works originated from forced sales. Following the establishment of the UK government's Spoliation Advisory Panel in 2000, Glasgow Museums listed works from the Burrell Collection on the official spoliation website whose provenance had gaps between 1933 and 1945. This has enabled two cases to be successfully resolved by the Spoliation Advisory Panel:

- A still life by Jean-Baptiste-Siméon Chardin from the sale of the stock of A. S. Drey, a Jewish-owned gallery in Munich. The panel agreed in 2004 that the painting had been subject to a forced sale and that it should be restituted to its rightful owners. The heirs accepted an ex gratia payment of £10,000 from Glasgow City Council and the painting remains in the collection.
- A Swiss early 16th-century tapestry, The Visitation, from the collection of Emma Budge, a Jewish art collector from Hamburg, The panel concluded in 2014 that Burrell's acquisition was the result of a forced sale. Glasgow City Council agreed to make an ex gratia payment to Budge's Estate that reflected the current market value of the tapestry. In consideration of this payment, Budge's Estate released any claim over the tapestry and it remains in the collection.

== Transport links ==
The nearest railway station to the Burrell Collection is Pollokshaws West (approximately a 10-minute walk), with trains to Glasgow Central normally operating four times per hour (three times an hour on Sundays).

Pollok House, administered by the National Trust for Scotland, is also situated in Pollok Country Park.

A free shuttle bus is also available, linking key points in the park from the Burrell Collection to Pollok House. One of the stops is located inside the park, nearby Pollokshaws Road, entrance and continues in a loop throughout the park.

== Gallery ==
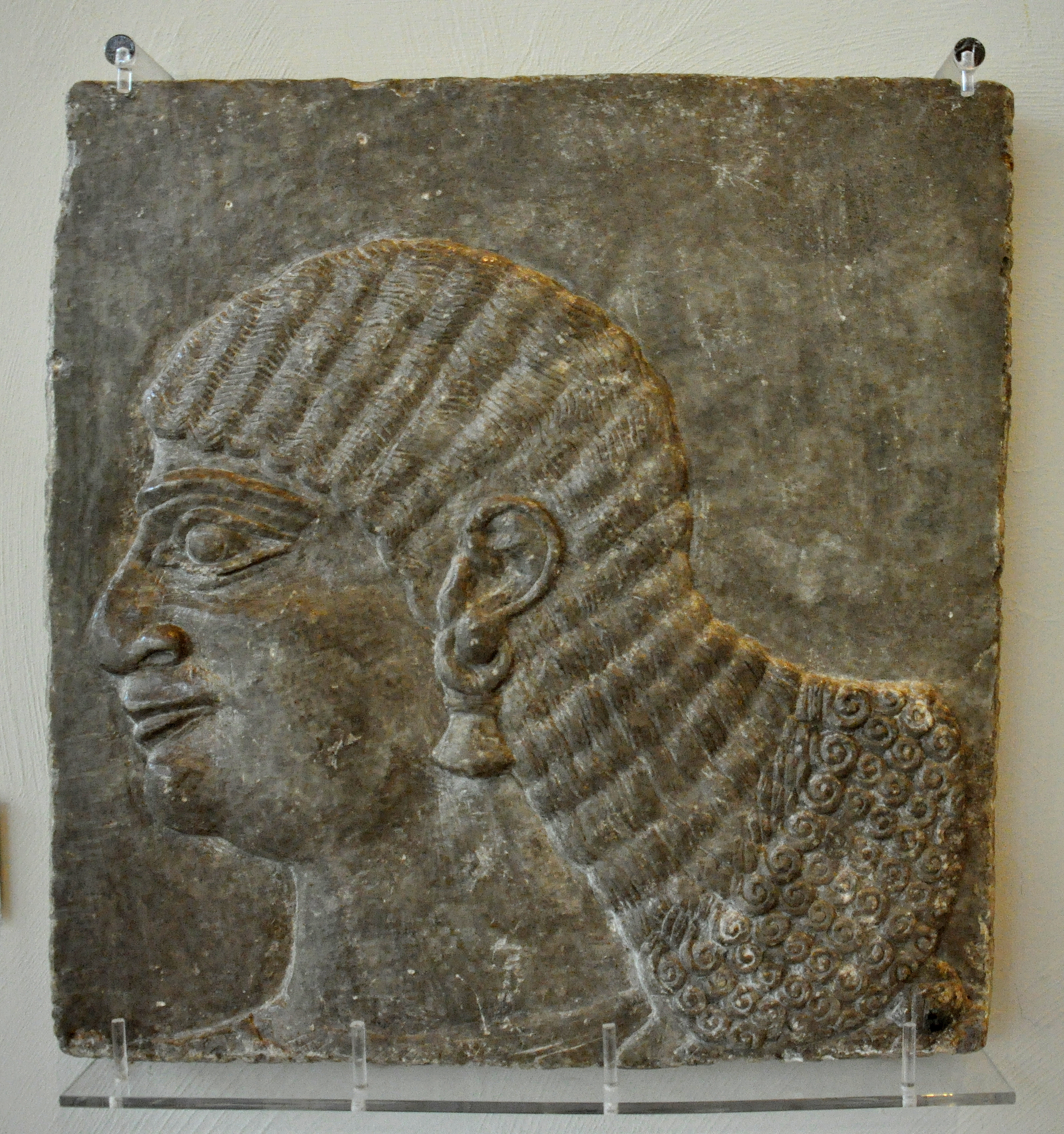
Head of a royal attendant. From the North-West Palace at Nimrud, Iraq. Reign of Ashurnasirpal II, 883–859 BCE

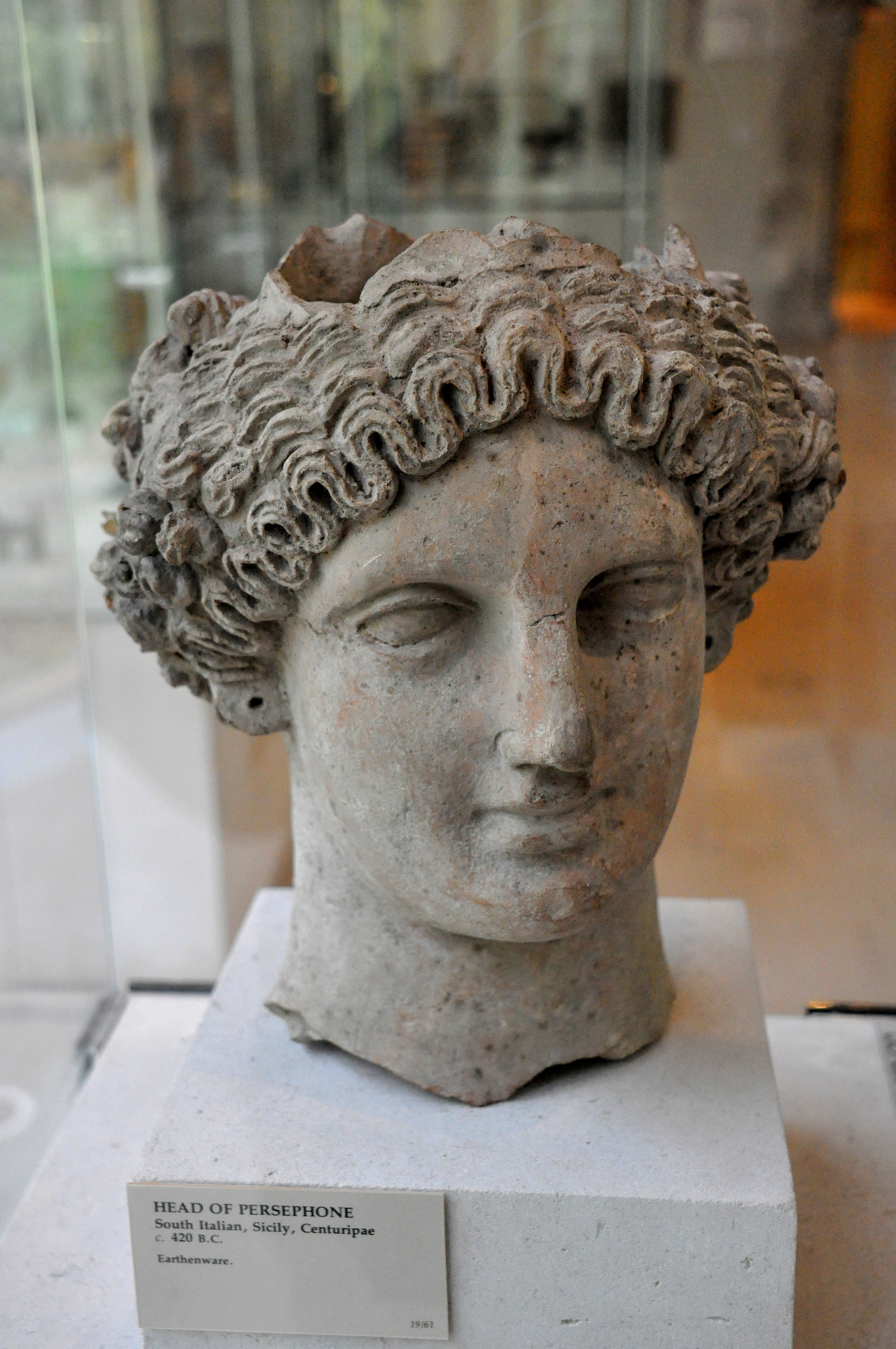
Head of Persephone. Earthenware. From Sicily, Centuripae, c. 420 BCE

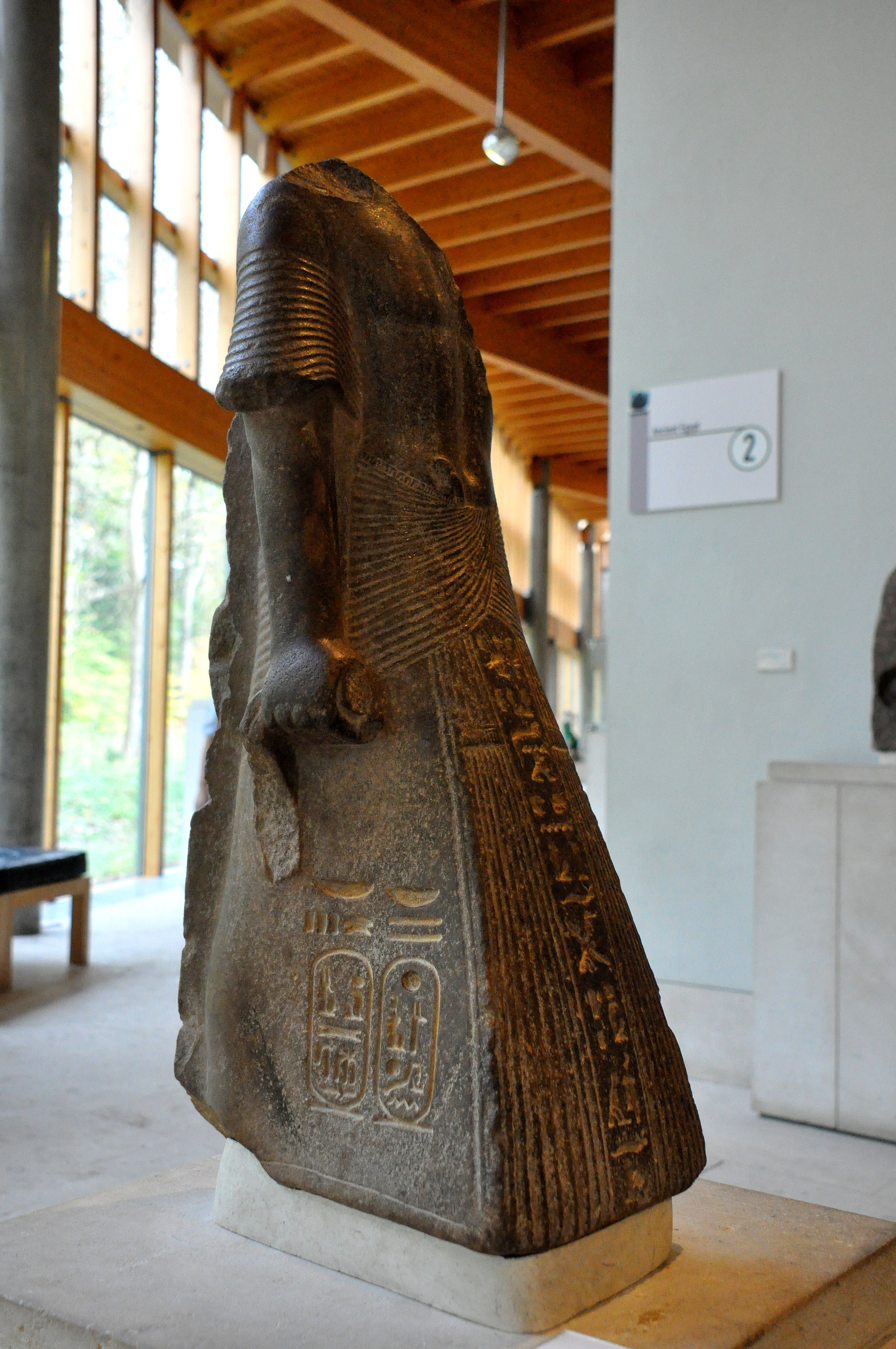
Paraherwenemef, Chief Charioteer. The nomen and prenomen cartouches of Ramesses II appear. From Egypt. 19th Dynasty, 1290–1224 BCE

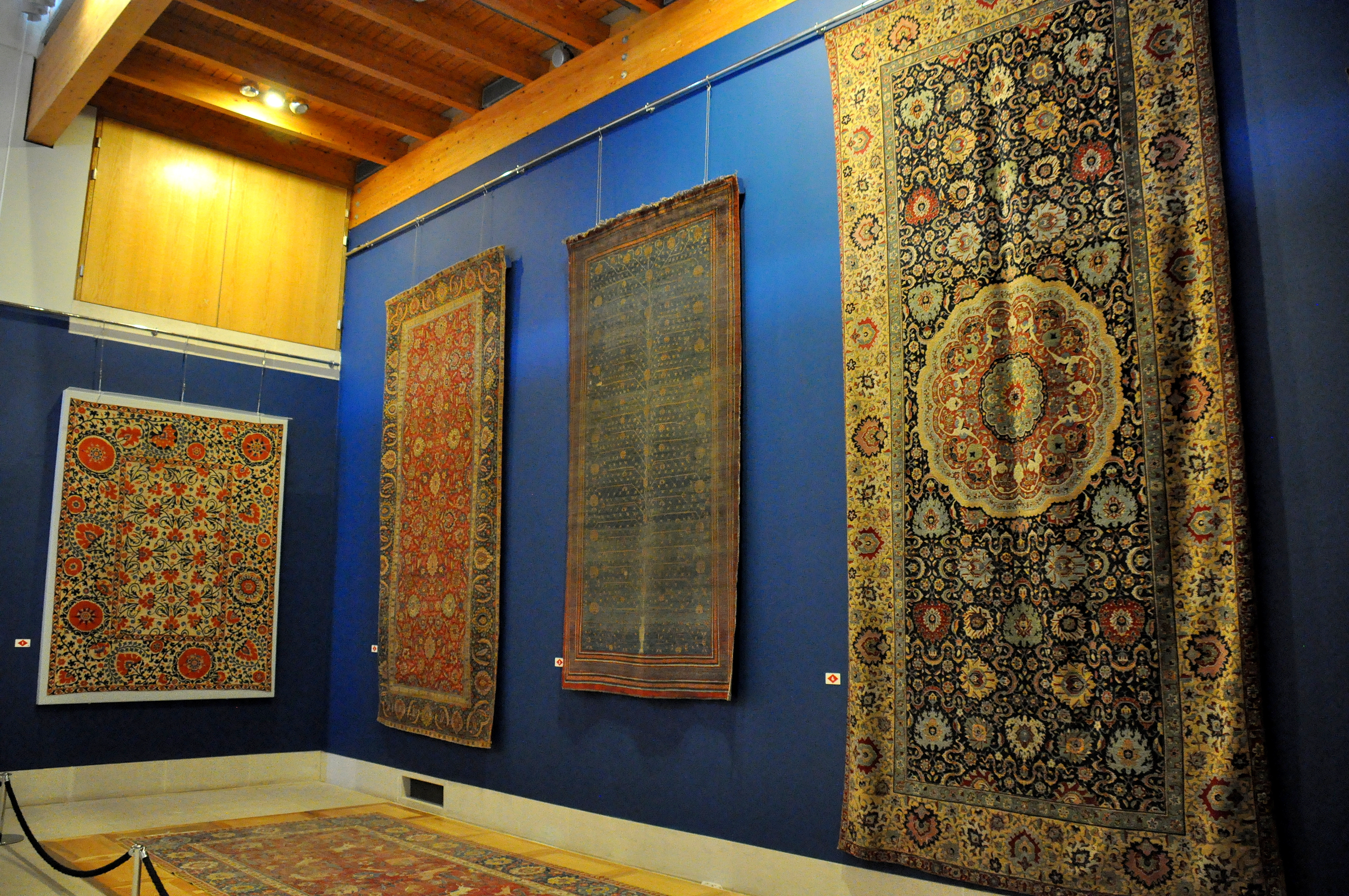
Persian carpets

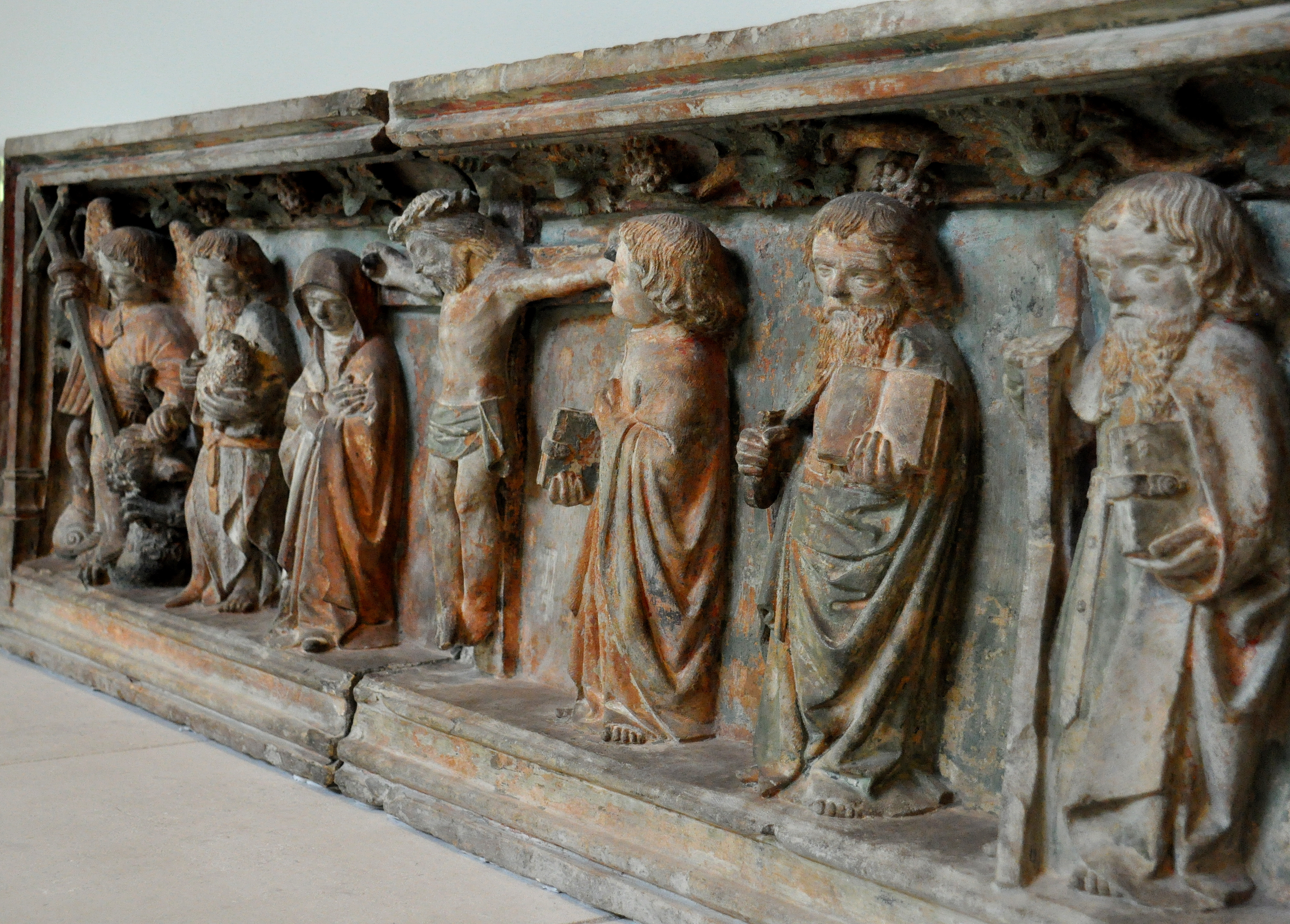
Christ on the cross, flanked by the Virgin and St. John the Evangelist and 4 other saints. Retable. Painted limestone. From Burgundy, France, c. 1450–1500 CE

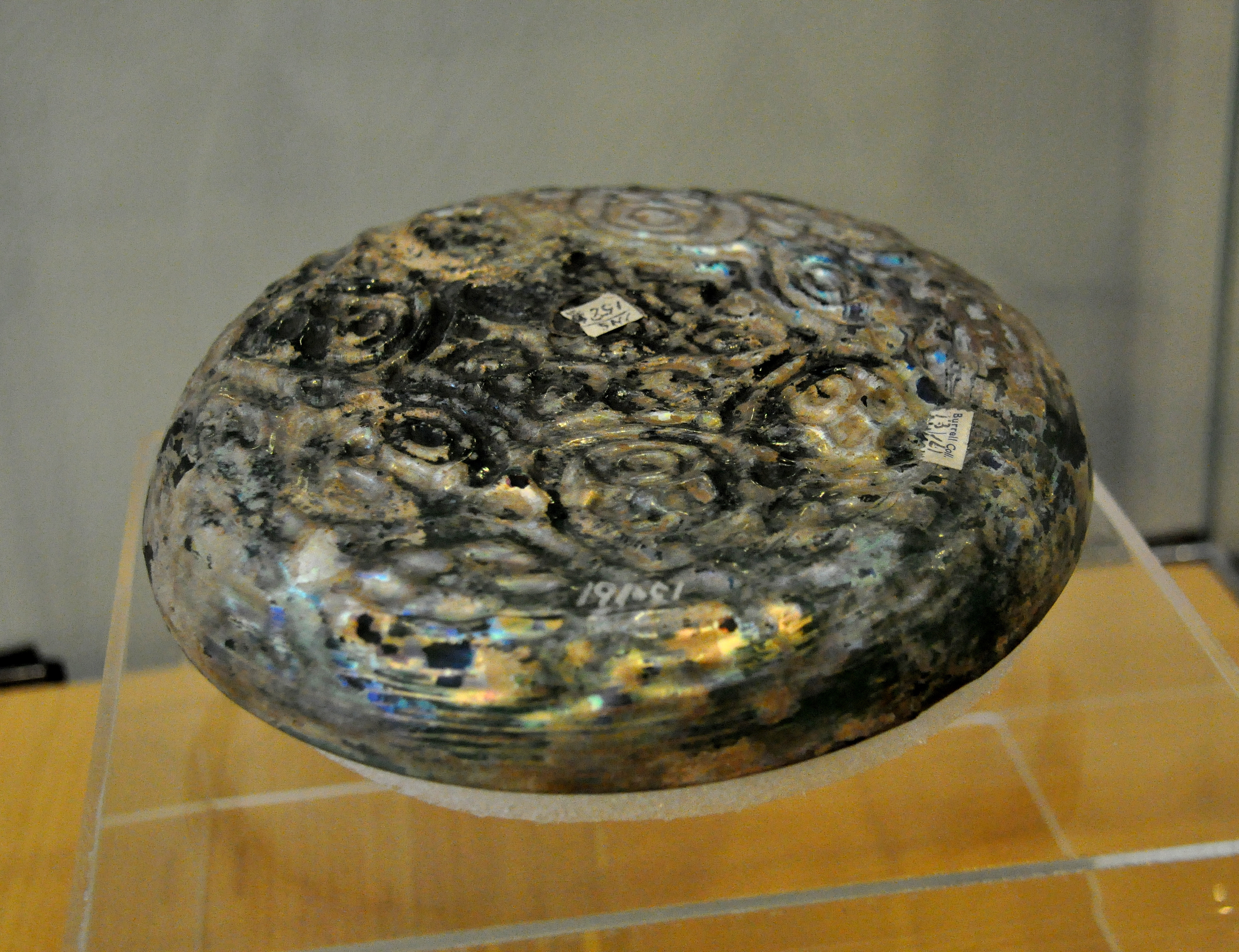
Glass dish. Green-tinted moulded glass. From Fustat, Egypt. Fatimid period, 11th century CE

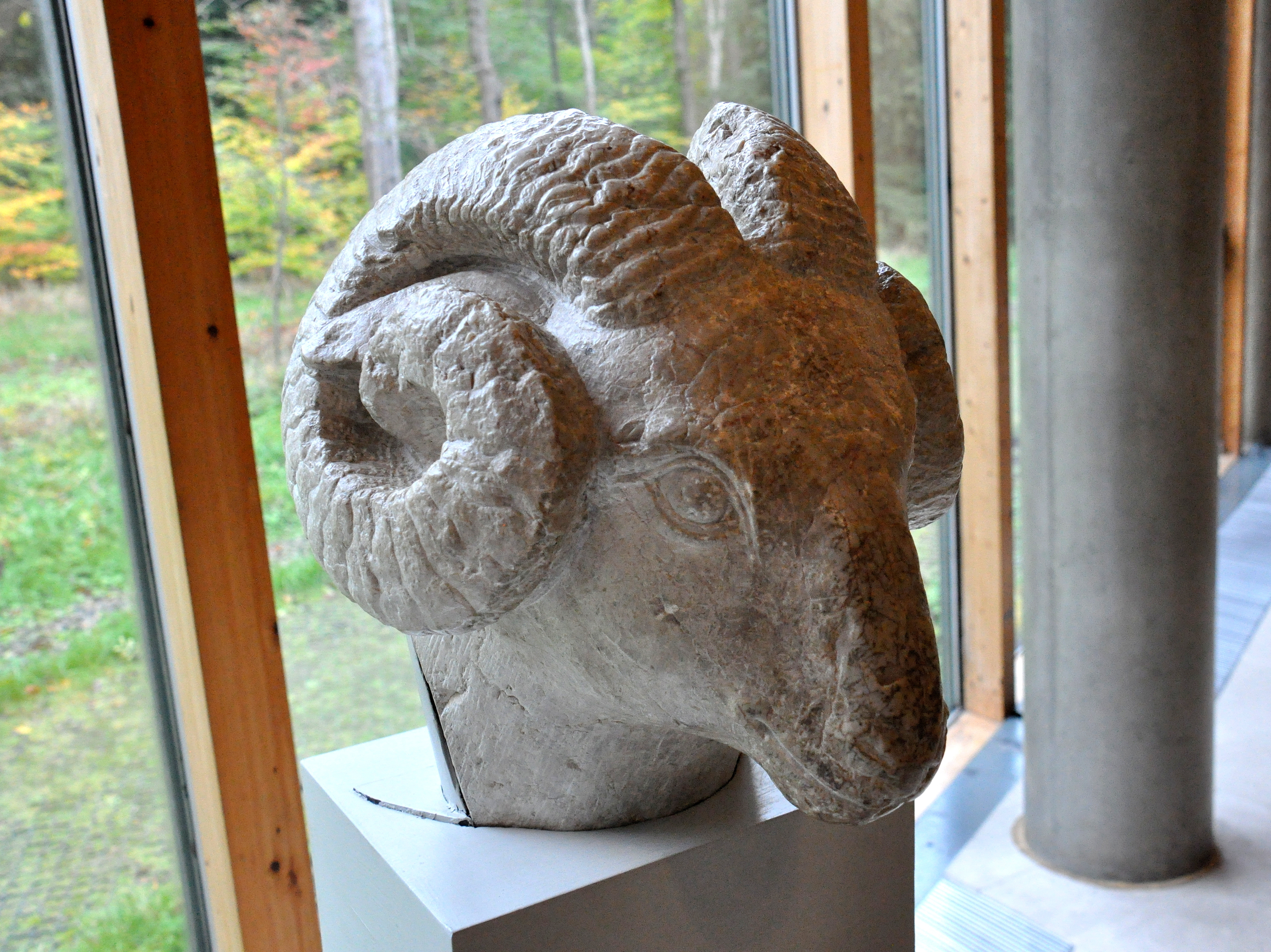
Ram's head. Limestone. From China, Tang dynasty, 618–907 CE

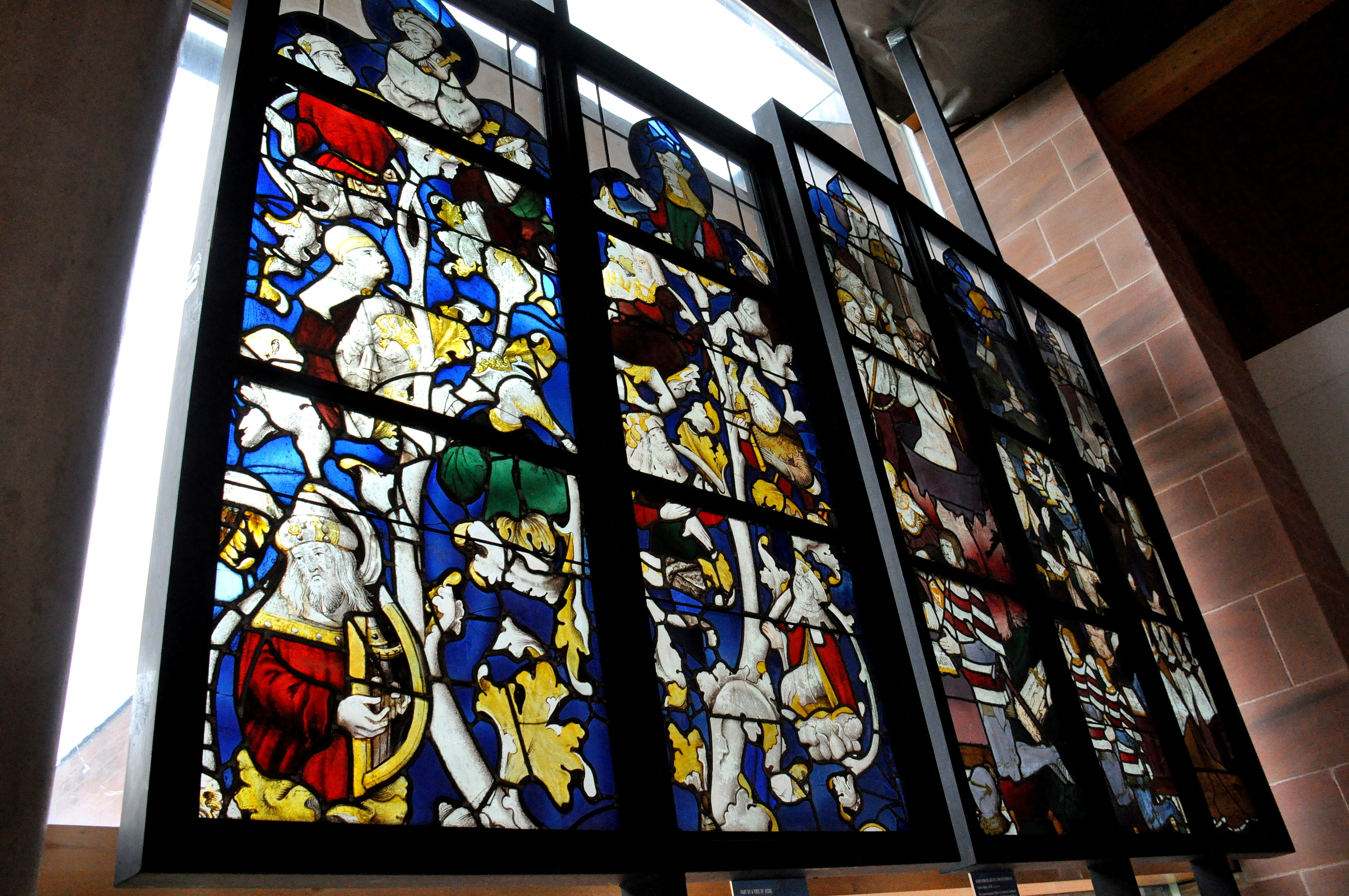
Stained glass. Medieval Europe

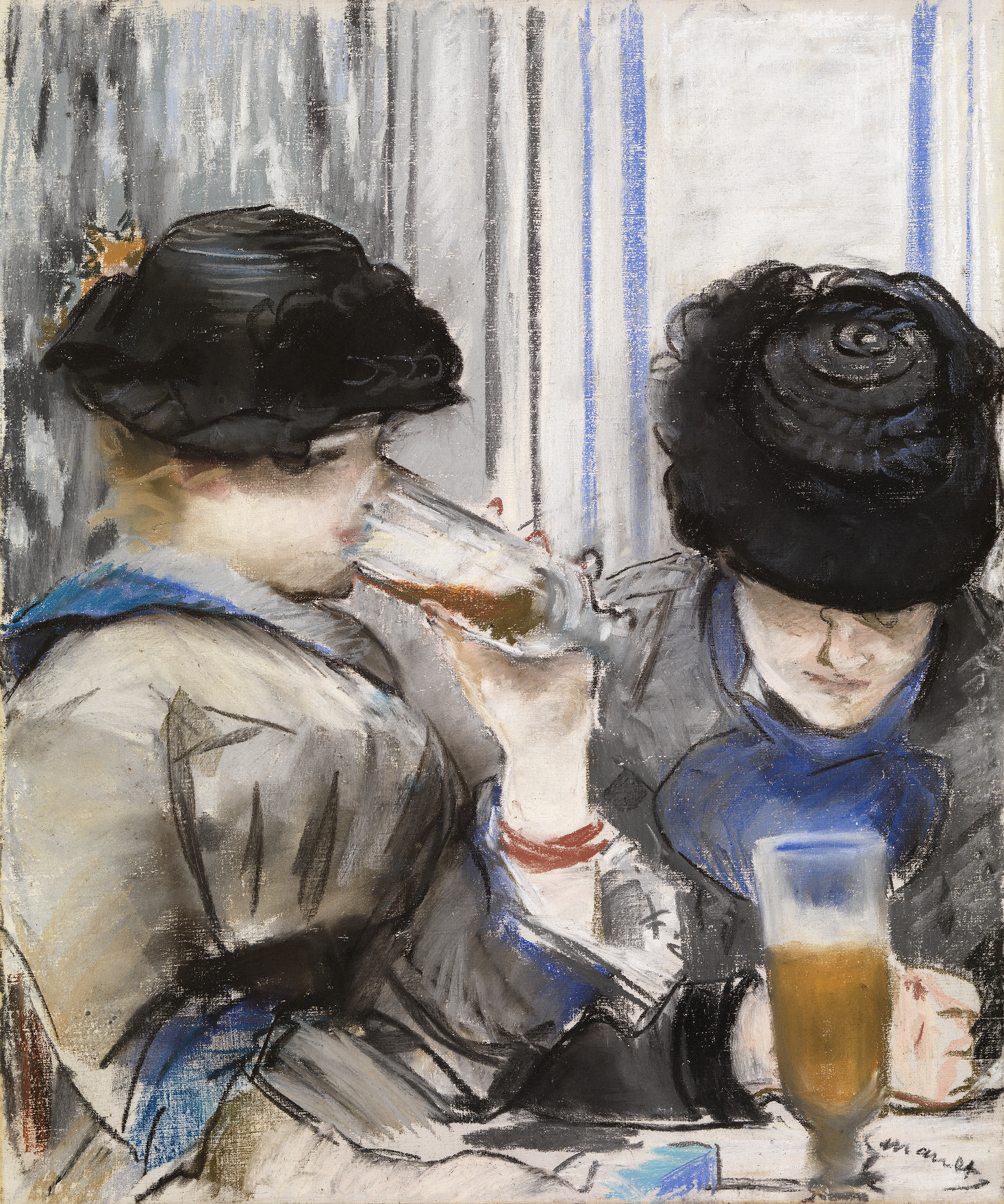
Women Drinking Beer, Manet, c. 1878

== See also ==
- List of Category A listed buildings in Glasgow
- List of post-war Category A listed buildings in Scotland
