= William Burrell =

Scottish shipping magnate and art collector (1861–1958)

Sir William Burrell
- Born: 9 July 1861; Glasgow, Scotland, United Kingdom of Great Britain and Ireland
- Died: 29 March 1958 (aged 96); Hutton Castle, Scotland, United Kingdom
- Occupation: Ship owner
- Known for: Art collecting

Sir William Burrell (9 July 1861 – 29 March 1958) was one of the world's great art collectors. He and his wife Constance, Lady Burrell (1875–1961), created a collection of over 8,000 artworks which they gave to their home city of Glasgow, Scotland, in 1944, in what has been described as 'one of the greatest gifts ever made to any city in the world'. It is displayed at the Burrell Collection museum in Glasgow.

== Biography ==
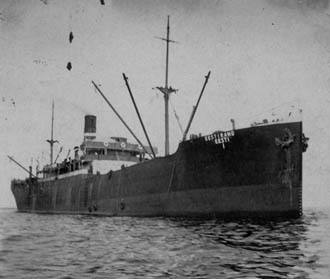
Ship built in 1910 as SS Strathardle owned Burrell & Son.

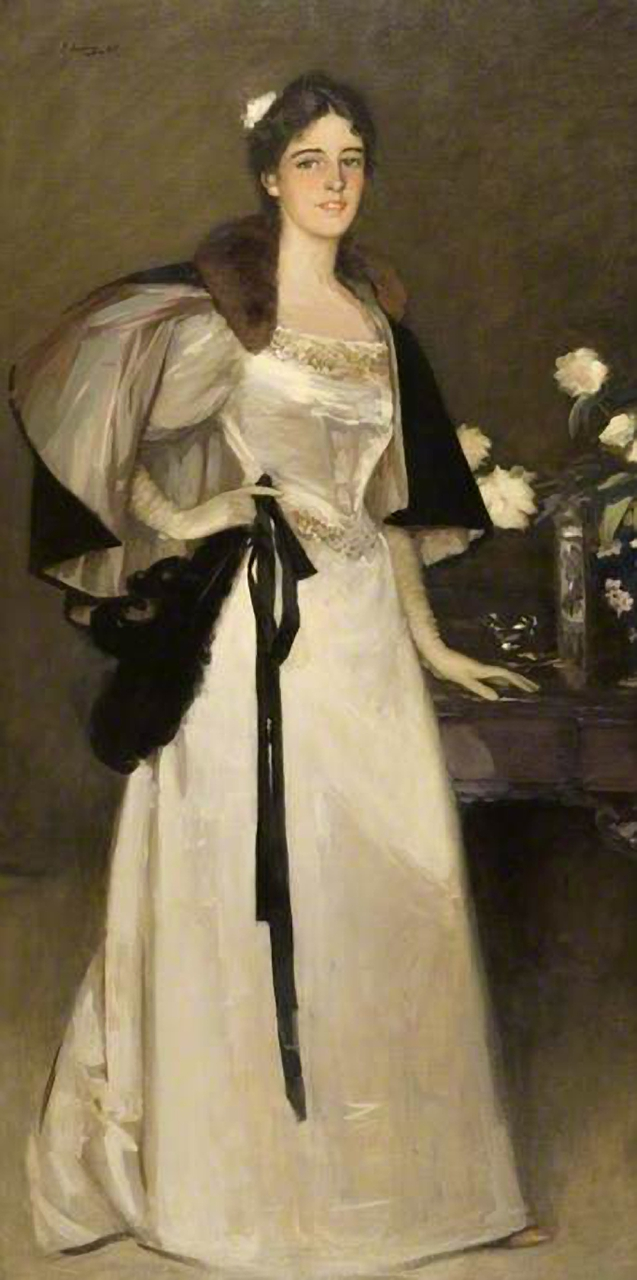
His sister, Mary

Born on 9 July 1861 in Glasgow, Burrell was the third of nine children to ship owner William Burrell (1832–1885) and Isabella Duncan (née Guthrie). Burrell's grandfather, George Burrell, had founded a shipping firm which became known as Burrell & Son. William Burrell was born into a prosperous middle-class family of ship owners. He joined this business in 1875, at the age of 14. When his father died in 1885, he and his brother George took over the business while still in their twenties and transformed it into one of the leading cargo shipping companies in Britain. William had a natural flair for business and earned himself a sizeable fortune. The bulk of his wealth came during the First World War when he sold most of his ships for many times more than what he had paid for them.

== Art collection ==
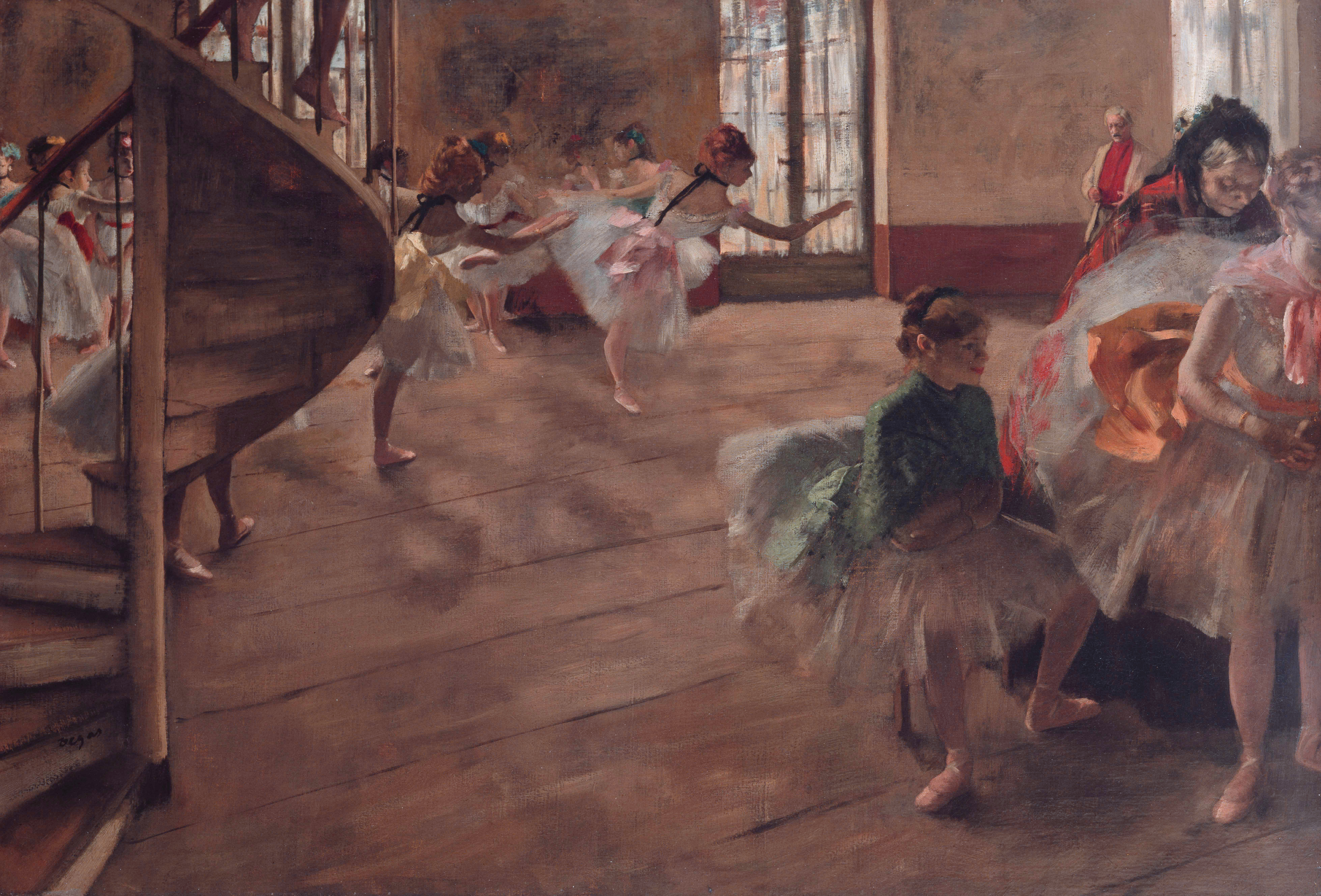
Degas, The Rehearsal. Burrell owned the largest number of Degas works of any collector in Britain.

Burrell had developed an interest in art as a boy and he used his wealth to steadily build his collection, quickly surpassing his local contemporaries in terms of the quantity and quality of his artworks and firmly established an international reputation as a collector of good taste and judgement. Burrell had an innate talent for art collecting. He understood what he was buying, and his refined taste led him to areas that other collectors dared not touch. His primary passion was for Gothic art and he built an outstanding collection of medieval and Renaissance tapestries, stained glass and furniture. His collection of Chinese bronzes and ceramics is one of the most comprehensive in the country, and his collection of French Impressionists contains numerous masterpieces by Manet, Cézanne and especially Degas. He was a faithful patron of Scottish artists including Joseph Crawhall II, George Henry and John Lavery. He commissioned Lavery to paint a portrait of his sister Mary Burrell in 1896. This portrait was exhibited widely and is considered one of Lavery's finest works.

Burrell used his wealth to advance himself in society and to purchase Hutton Castle in Berwickshire, where his Gothic collections were displayed to great effect. But his wealth and art collection were not simply for personal gain. Burrell had a deep sense of public duty, serving for long periods as a local councillor in Glasgow and Berwickshire, and as a trustee of the National Galleries of Scotland and the Tate Gallery in London. He wished to use his art collection for public good and lent large parts of it to galleries around the country so that as many people as possible could enjoy it. In 1927 he was knighted for his public and political work and services to art in Scotland.

Unlike most collectors, his collection was not sold or bequeathed for personal or family gain. He donated the majority of his collection to Glasgow in 1944, which at the time amounted to 6,000 items. He continued to add to collection so that today it amounts to a staggering 9,000 artworks. He also donated smaller parts of his collection to Berwick-upon-Tweed and several other provincial galleries, with the aim of enhancing the cultural standing of these places.

In 1944 Burrell donated his collection to the city of Glasgow. At the time of his gift to Glasgow the collection was valued at well in excess of £1 million, and it came with an additional £450,000 in cash to build a dedicated museum for it. This was a major act of philanthropy. Burrell simply wanted people to gain as much pleasure from art as he had, and to improve their lives through a better understanding and appreciation of beauty.

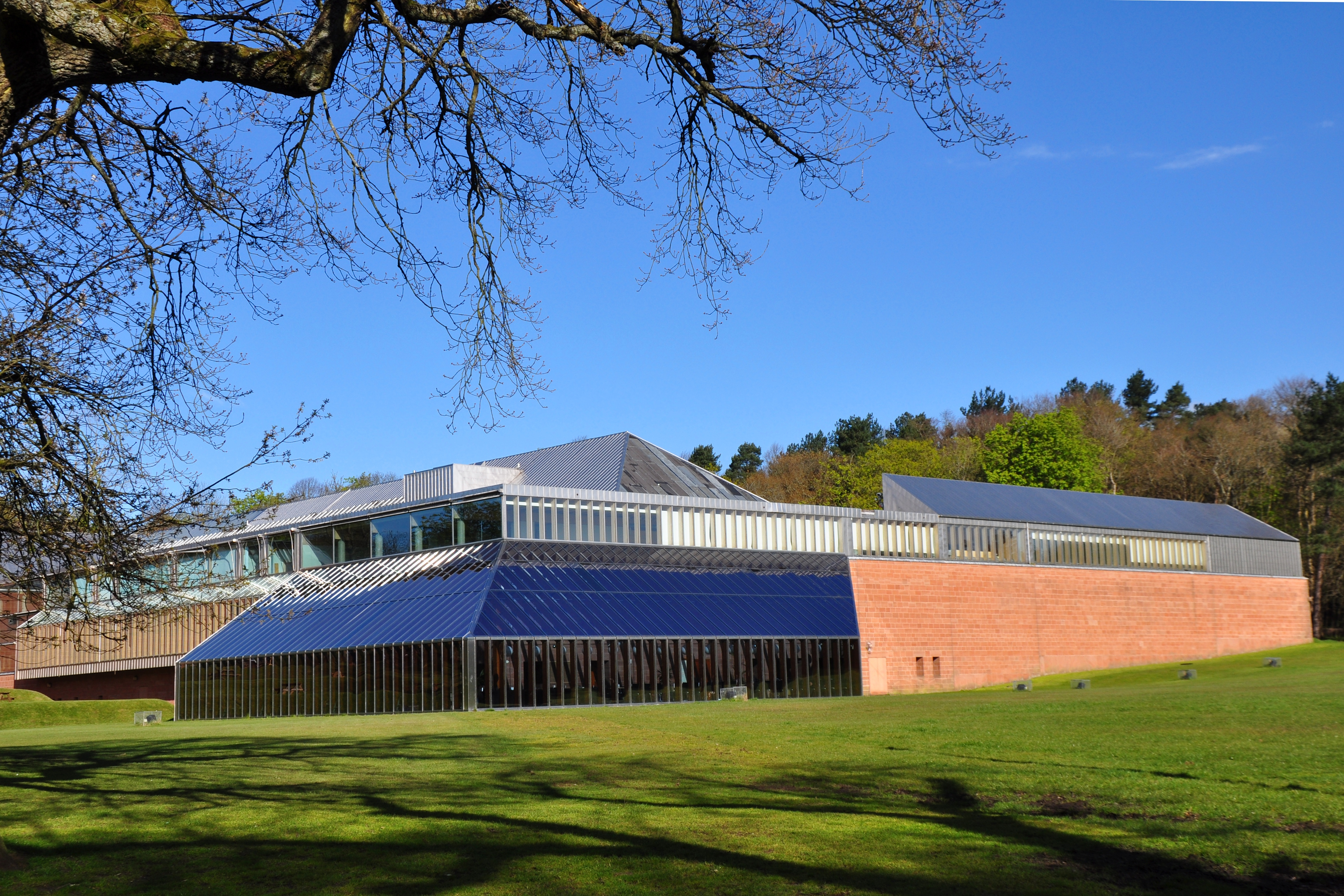
The Burrell Collection, Glasgow

Burrell had clear intentions regarding the collection's location, contents and display, and he stated that the collection was to be housed 'in a suitable distinct and separated building' that was to be 'within four miles of Killearn, Stirlingshire, and not less than sixteen miles from Glasgow Royal exchange'. These conditions proved impossible and it was not until the city of Glasgow acquired Pollok Country Park in 1967 that a museum in the spirit of his wishes could be built. A custom-built museum, the Burrell Collection, was finally opened in 1983. Provand's Lordship in Glasgow also displays some of his collection of 17th century Scottish furniture.

Several works of art in the Burrell collection were found to have been duress sales or looted from German Jews.

== Family ==
In 1901 Burrell married Constance Mary Lockhart Mitchell. They were married at the Westbourne United Free Church on 19 September 1901. William was 40 and Constance was just 25, but this was very much a marriage of financial equals. Constance was the daughter of the leading merchant and ship owner James Lockhart Mitchell and had inherited considerable wealth.

Constance gave birth to a daughter, Marion, on 6 August 1902. It was not an easy birth and Constance suffered terribly as a result. She endured great physical pain and developed postnatal depression. A couple of years later Constance had to have an operation on her kidney and again had a long and difficult convalescence. As a result, Constance was to suffer physical and mental ill health for the rest of her life.

Marion (1902–1992) grew into a noted society beauty, but had a troubled relationship with her parents. When she made what William thought were inappropriate romantic liaisons, he quickly intervened to cancel her engagements. She later changed her name to Silvia.

Burrell's collecting passions were shared with his wife Constance, who played an active role in developing the collection. In his will Burrell was very particular in stating: 'I have had the benefit of my wife's help in many ways including financial help and have received from her the greatest assistance and most wholehearted support in forming the collection . . . it is my desire that it be distinctly understood that the entire gift is from my wife and myself and that her name shall always be associated with mine and shall receive full acknowledgement in all official literature relating to the collection'. William and Constance were faithful and loving companions throughout their married lives, and operated very much in partnership in their business, collecting and philanthropic endeavours.

== Death ==
William Burrell died of heart failure brought on by pneumonia at Hutton Castle on 29 March 1958 at the age of 96. After years of declining health, Constance Burrell died of heart failure on 15 August 1961 at Hutton Castle, aged 85. They are buried in Largs, where many other family members are also buried.

== Awards and honours ==
Burrell was knighted in the 1927 Birthday Honours for his public and political work and services to art in Scotland.

In 1932 he was awarded the Hungarian Order of Merit, Second Class, by Miklós Horthy, regent of Hungary, 'in recognition of the very valuable services he rendered in protecting Hungarian interests in Glasgow'.

The Freedom of the City of Glasgow was conferred upon him on 26 May 1944. He was the recipient of the 1946 St Mungo Prize, awarded to the individual who has done most in the previous three years to improve and promote the city of Glasgow.

== Freemasonry ==
Burrell was a Scottish Freemason, initiated in the Prince's Lodge No.607, on 9 May, Passed on 7 November 1892 and Raised on 12 March 1893. Freemasonry was not a major part of his life.
