= Hunger Hill, Lancashire =

Village in Lancashire, England

Coordinates: 53°35′49″N 2°41′47″W

Hunger Hill
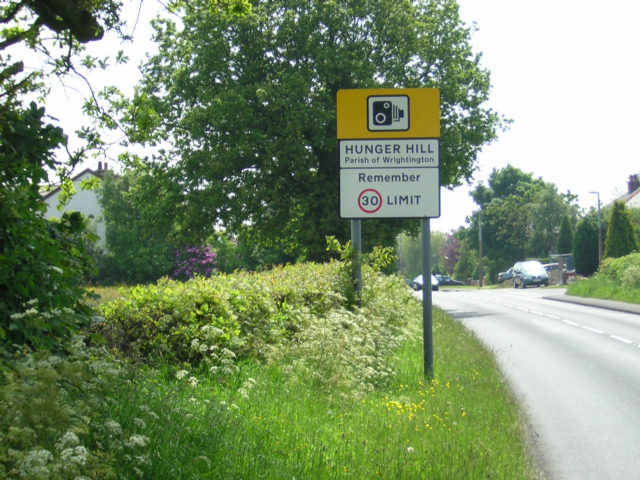
- Sign at Hunger Hill

- Location within Lancashire
- Civil parish: Wrightington
- District: West Lancashire
- Shire county: Lancashire
- Region: North West
- Country: England
- Sovereign state: United Kingdom
- Post town: WIGAN
- Postcode district: WN6
- Dialling code: 01257
- UK Parliament: West Lancashire

Hunger Hill is a small village three-quarters of a mile (1.2 km) from the centre of Wrightington, in West Lancashire, England. It is described as a rural settlement. It is on the B5250 Mossy Lee Road, and is in the civil parish of Wrightington. According to local tradition, Hunger Hill gets its name from August 1648 during the Second English Civil War after The Battle of Preston when royalist soldiers who were much depleted stopped in the village for supplies. The village is home to the White Lion pub, which has been serving the community since at least 1845.
