= Hunston, Suffolk =

Village in Suffolk, England

Coordinates: 52.283°N 0.9°E

Hunston
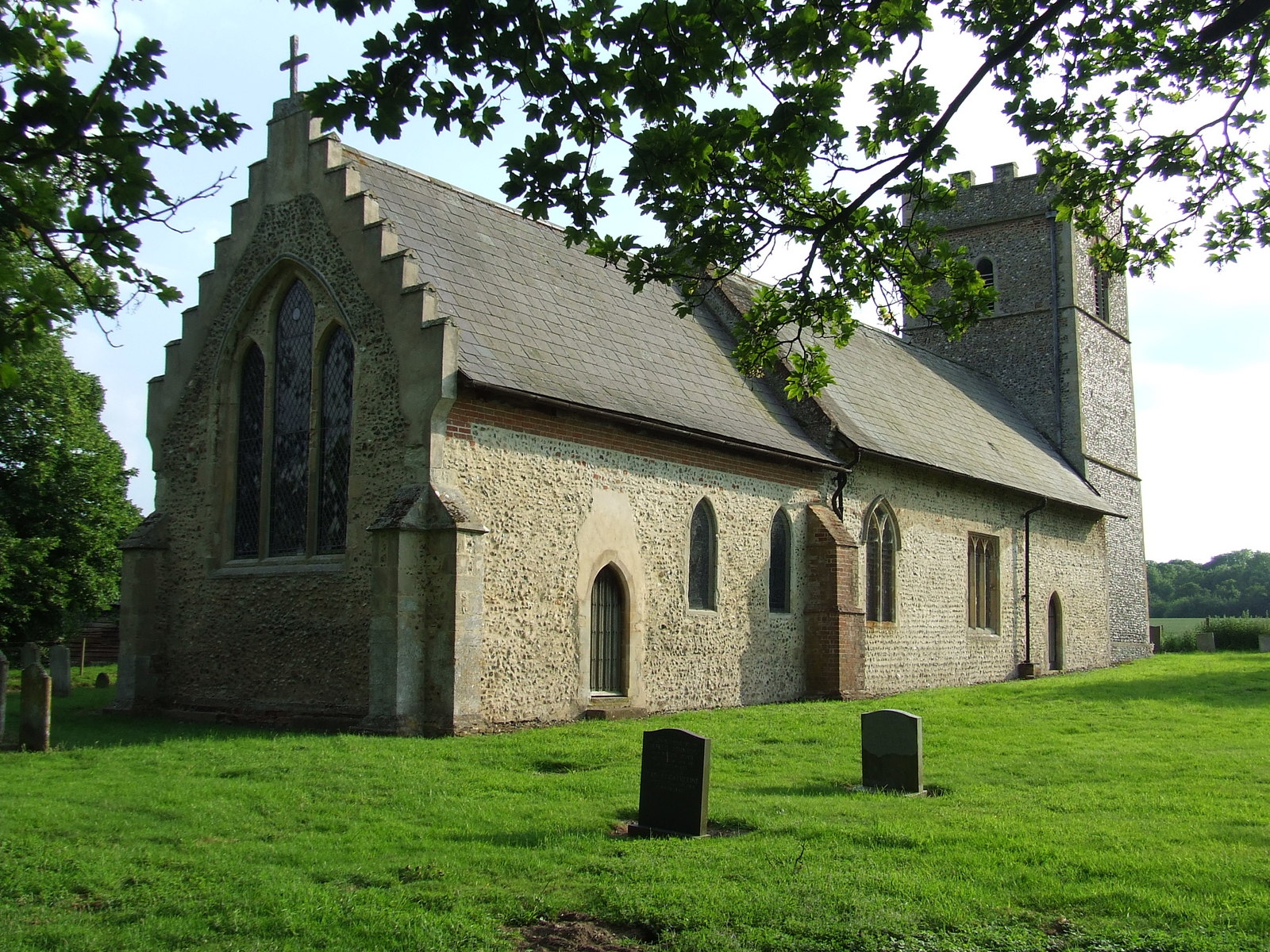
- St Michael's church

- Location within Suffolk
- Area: 3.014 sq mi (7.81 km^{2})
- Population: 197 (2011 Census)
  - Density: 65/sq mi (25/km^{2})
- District: Mid Suffolk
- Shire county: Suffolk
- Region: East
- Country: England
- Sovereign state: United Kingdom
- Post town: Bury St Edmunds
- Postcode district: IP31
- UK Parliament: Waveney Valley

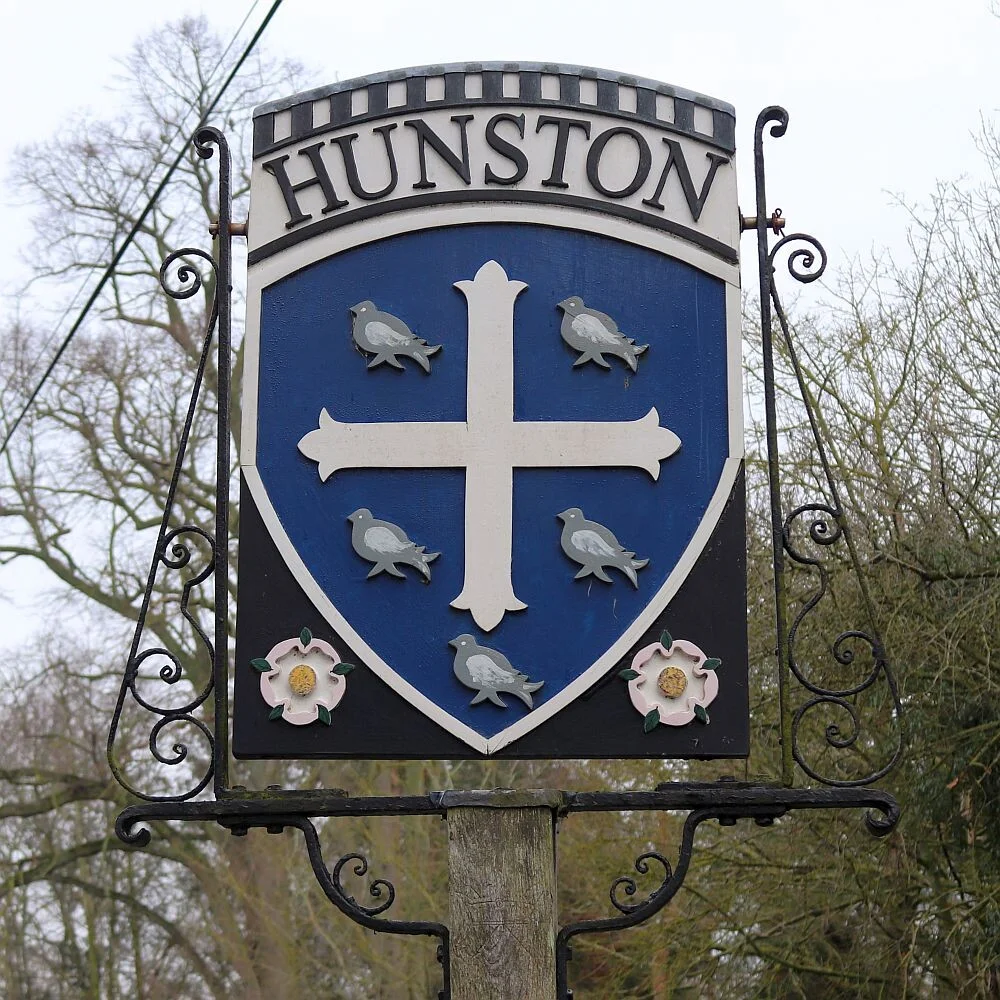
Hunston Village Sign

Hunston is a small Suffolk village and civil parish set in a conservation area of Mid-Suffolk and lies between Stowlangtoft and Badwell Ash off the A1088, nearly eight miles east of the centre of Bury St Edmunds. It is set in flattish farmland, mostly arable.

== St Michael's Church ==
St Michael's Church stands in farmland about one-third of a mile south of the village centre, behind the site of Hunston Hall. It is an interesting specimen of Early English architecture. There are a number of Early English windows and some perpendicular insertions. The nave roof is of good hammer-beam type, the restored chancel roof being copied from it. The chancel arch is plain, supported on circular shafts with richly foliated capitals.

The priest's door to the south is elegant; the head is a segmented arch boldly trifoliated the cusps are terminated with fleur-de-lys. In the east wall of the transept is a niche leaf with beautiful moulding of foliate design In the south-east angle of the transept is a beautiful Early English double piscina under two trefoil arches one in each wall supported on three circular shafts the central shaft being in the angle of the walls In the chancel are two ancient benches with well carved poppy heads.

The font is Norman. Near the font is a well preserved chest of unusual design.

The 14th-century flint tower, which contains five bells, is plain decorated of three stages without buttresses with a late brick parapet. In 1887 the chancel was thoroughly restored by the late JH Heigham. In the same year the chancel floor was relaid with mosaic work by Major C Heigham, who in 1882 placed six new windows in the chancel. The most recent refurbishment, completed in 2005, was restoration of a central window in the chancel.

=== Bells ===
There are five bells hung in the tower cast between the 17th and 19th centuries. The bells were overhauled in 1896 by George Day & Sons of Eye. The tower is affiliated to the Suffolk Guild of Ringers.

Bells of St Michael's Hunston
Bell	Date	Note	Founder				
Bell	Date	Note	Founder	Treble	1898	Eb	John Warner & Sons
2nd	1770	Db	Pack & Chapman				
3rd	1614	C	John Driver				
4th	1617	Bb	John Driver				
Tenor	1898	Ab	John Warner & Sons				
