= Giant sequoia exhibitions =

Giant sequoias exhibited in the 19th century

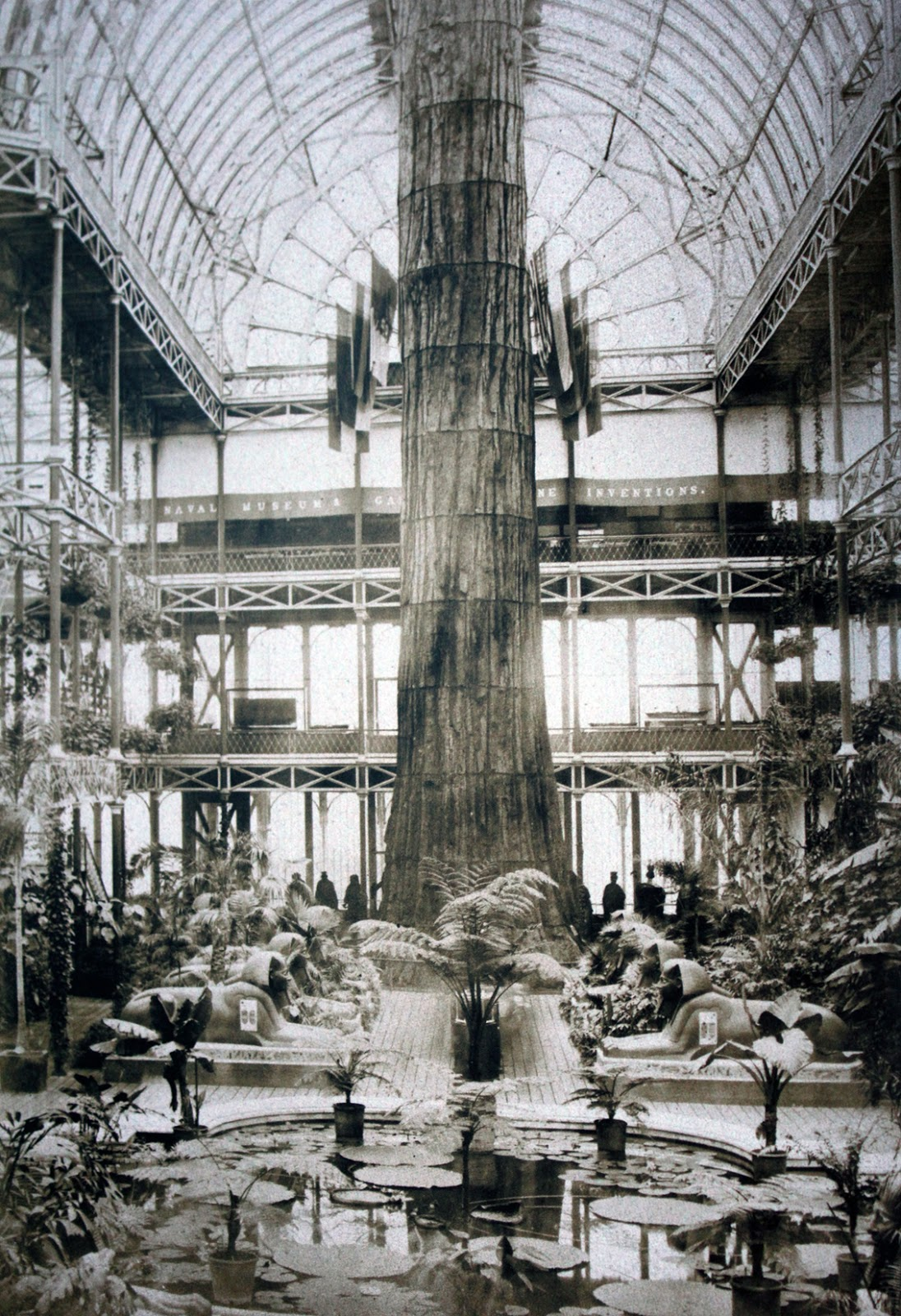
Mother of the Forest in London's The Crystal Palace in 1859.

During the second half of the 19th century, several giant sequoias from California's Sierra Nevada were felled or stripped of their bark so that portions of the trees could be transported and displayed at exhibitions in the United States and Europe. Exhibits included cross-sections of trunks and reassembled sections of bark, allowing audiences far from California to see the scale of the recently publicized "Big Trees". The exhibitions began following the discovery of the Calaveras Grove by European Americans in the early 1850s and continued into the early 20th century.

Early examples included the Discovery Tree, felled in 1853, and the Mother of the Forest, whose bark was removed in 1854 and later exhibited in New York and London. Other giant sequoias were cut for exhibitions and museums during the following decades, including the Forest King, the Mark Twain Tree, and the General Noble Tree. The destruction of giant sequoias for exhibition also became part of the developing debate over preservation of the trees.

== Notable exhibitions ==
Notable exhibitions
Tree name	Year	Native grove	Description	Image
Discovery Tree	1853	Calaveras Grove	In 1853, the Discovery Tree was cut down for exhibition after its discovery the previous year had brought widespread attention to the giant sequoias of Calaveras Grove. Five men spent 22 days cutting through the tree using pump augers. Sections of its bark and trunk were exhibited in San Francisco and later shipped around Cape Horn to New York City. The New York exhibition was unsuccessful, and the remains were destroyed by fire while awaiting shipment to Paris. The tree's stump, known as the Big Stump, remains in Calaveras Big Trees State Park and became an early tourist attraction; dances were held on the stump and a bowling alley was built along the fallen trunk.	Workers felling the Discovery Tree with pump augers.
Mother of the Forest	Left standing	Calaveras Grove	In 1854, the Mother of the Forest was stripped of nearly 60 tons of bark to a height of 116 feet (35 m) for exhibition. The bark was shipped around Cape Horn and reassembled at the New York Crystal Palace, before being taken to London and exhibited at The Crystal Palace in Sydenham as the "Mammoth Tree from California." The London exhibit was destroyed when part of the Crystal Palace burned in 1866. The stripped tree remained standing in Calaveras Grove until fire destroyed it in 1908.	Stripped of its bark, the Mother of the Forest became vulnerable to fire and burned in 1908.
Forest King	1870	Nelder Grove	After the Forest King was felled in Nelder Grove in 1870, a section of its trunk was prepared for exhibition and transported to Stockton, California. The exhibit subsequently traveled by rail to cities including Chicago, Cincinnati, and New York City. P. T. Barnum acquired the exhibit in 1871 and displayed it at his New York attractions. In 1874, he gave it to publisher Frank Leslie, who installed it at his estate in Saratoga Springs, New York, beneath a pavilion constructed over the hollow trunk. The stump of the Forest King in Nelder Grove was rediscovered in 2003.	Promotional handbill for The Forest King exhibition.
Centennial Stump	1875	General Grant Grove	In 1875, a giant sequoia in Grant Grove was felled at the direction of William and Thomas Vivian, who planned to exhibit sections of the tree at the Centennial Exposition in Philadelphia the following year. Two 16-foot (4.9 m) sections were cut from the trunk for the exhibit and transported to Philadelphia, where portions were reassembled for display. The remains of the tree are known as the Centennial Stump. Women from a nearby logging camp later held Sunday school services for their children on the stump.	The Centennial Stump in 1919.
Mark Twain Tree	1891	Converse Basin Grove	The Mark Twain Tree was felled in 1891 in what is now Kings Canyon National Park. Sections of the trunk were preserved for exhibition, including a cross-section now displayed at the American Museum of Natural History in New York City. The museum's section weighs about nine tons and contains 1,342 annual growth rings.	Fifty men stand on the massive stump of the Mark Twain Tree.
General Noble Tree	1892	Converse Basin Grove	The General Noble Tree was felled in Converse Basin Grove in 1892 for exhibition at the World's Columbian Exposition in Chicago the following year. Sections of the trunk were transported from the Sierra Nevada to Chicago and reassembled for display at the exposition. After the fair, the exhibit was moved to Washington, D.C., where it remained on display for several decades. The remaining stump, now known as the Chicago Stump, survives in Giant Sequoia National Monument.	A segment of the General Noble on display at the Chicago World's Fair.

== Conservation impact ==
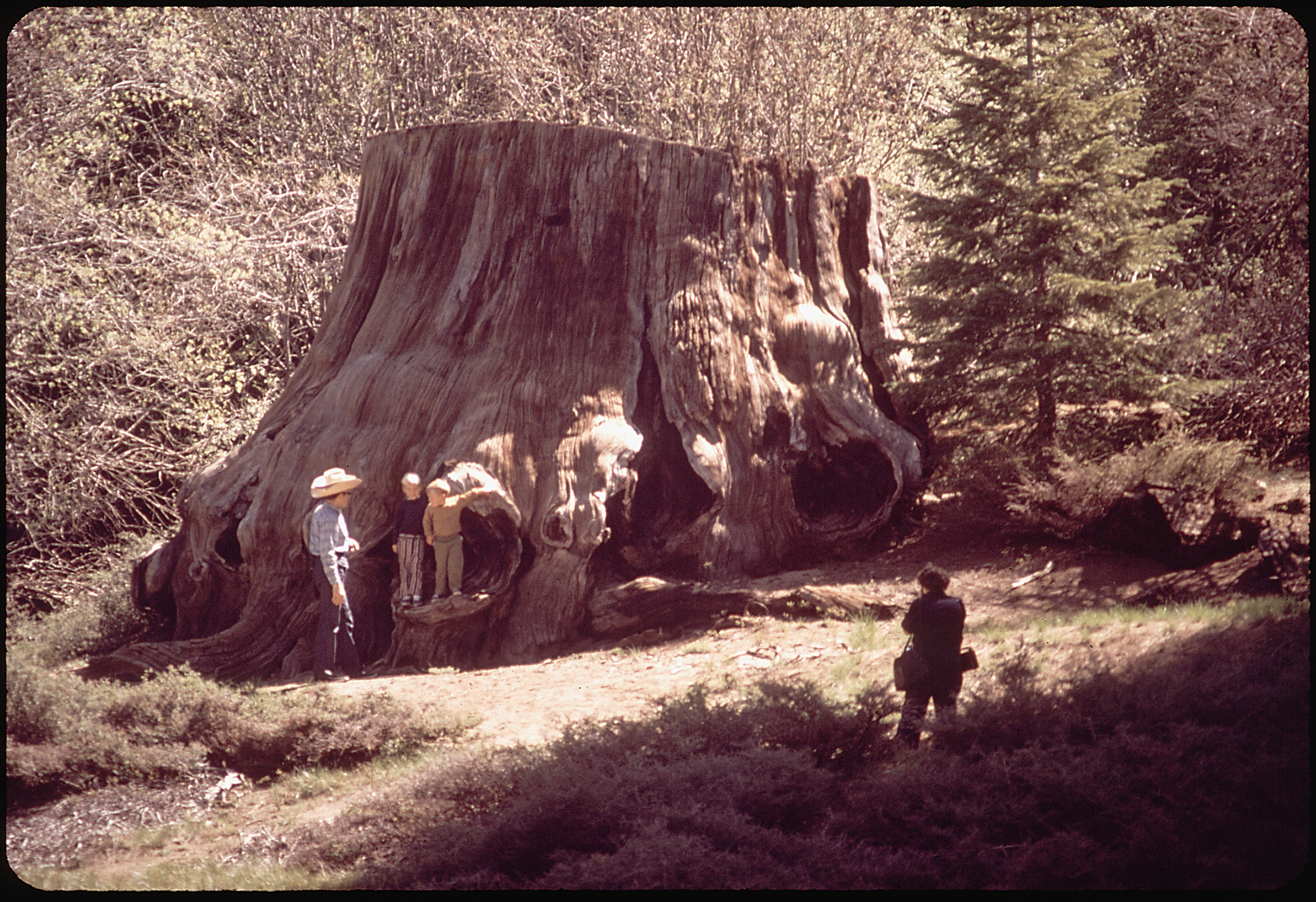
The stump of the General Noble Tree, now called the Chicago Stump, in Converse Basin Grove.

The destruction of giant sequoias for exhibition contributed to an emerging preservation movement in California during the mid-19th century. The stripping of the Mother of the Forest in 1854 drew particular criticism. A National Park Service history of Yosemite states that publicity surrounding the destruction of the Calaveras Grove trees helped build support for the preservation of giant sequoias and influenced public attitudes toward protecting natural landscapes.

In 1864, Senator John Conness introduced legislation granting Yosemite Valley and the Mariposa Grove to California for preservation and public use. In presenting the bill, Conness noted that the giant sequoias were subject to damage and said the purpose of the grant was to provide for their "constant preservation." President Abraham Lincoln signed the Yosemite Grant into law on June 30, 1864, protecting Yosemite Valley and the Mariposa Grove for public use.

California enacted additional protections for giant sequoias in the 1870s, including legislation prohibiting the cutting or stripping of trees more than 16 feet (4.9 m) in diameter in several Sierra Nevada counties. The law was widely ignored, however, and commercial logging of giant sequoia groves continued during the late 19th and early 20th centuries.

== See also ==
- Heritage Tree
- Tunnel Tree
