= C.C. Curtis =

American pioneer photographer

C. C. Curtis
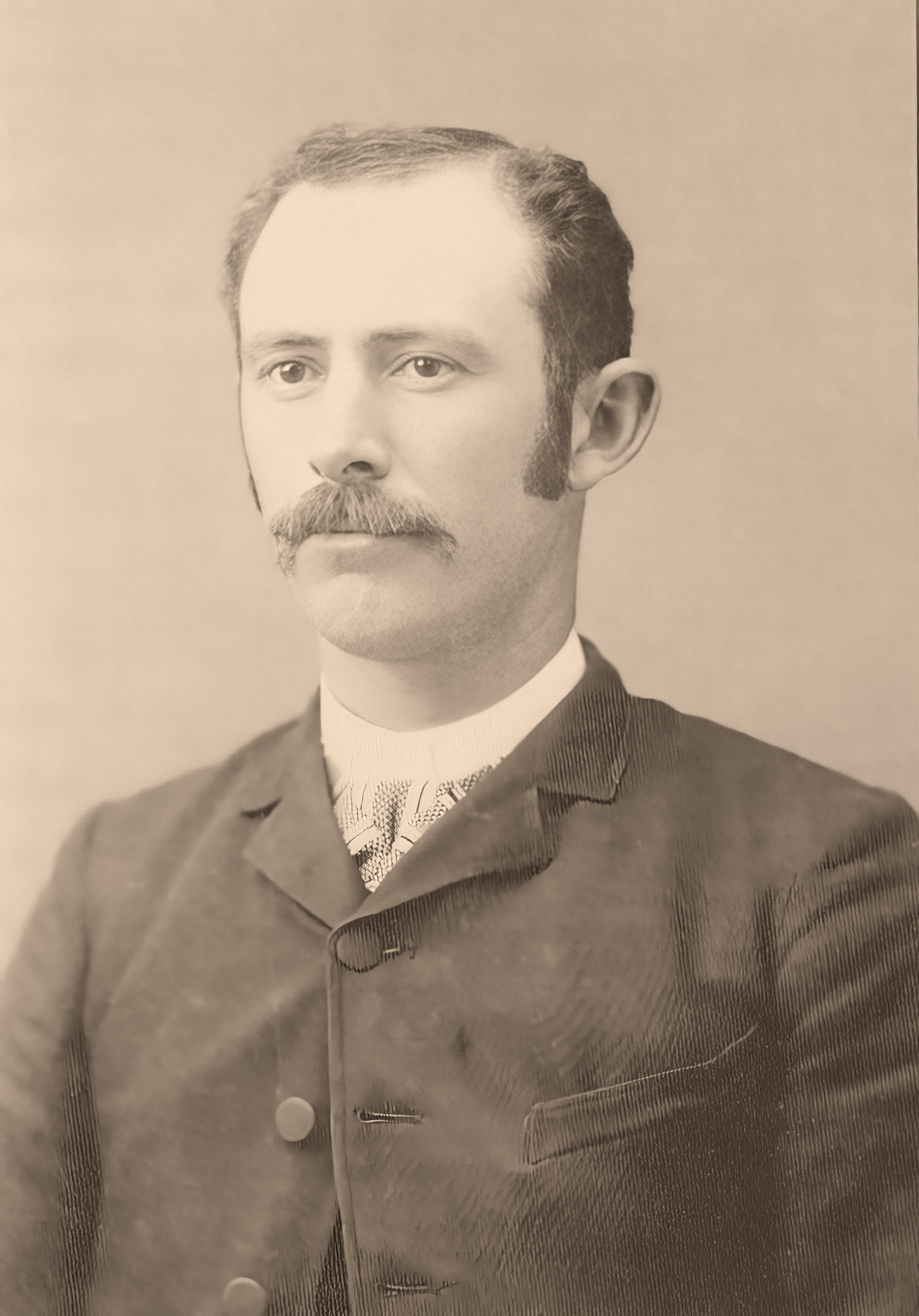
- Portrait, c. 1881
- Born: Charles Clifford Curtis; May 28, 1862; Marshalltown, Iowa, U.S.
- Died: March 4, 1956 (aged 93); Long Beach, California, U.S.
- Occupations: Photographer, farmer
- Spouse: Maria Dewey (1864–1932)
- Children: Claude Howard Curtis (1885–1885); Cecile Genevieve Curtis (1886); Eugene Charles Curtis (1890–1890)

Charles Clifford Curtis (May 28, 1862 – March 4, 1956) was an American photographer who worked in California's San Joaquin Valley and Sierra Nevada during the late 19th century. He photographed communities, tourism, and logging in the region, including the felling of the Mark Twain Tree and General Noble Tree, two giant sequoias cut for exhibition. Many of his surviving photographs document logging operations and life around Grant Grove and Converse Basin. His work is held in collections of the National Park Service, UCLA, and the Library of Congress.

== Early life ==
Curtis was born in Marshalltown, Iowa, on May 28, 1862. He moved to California at age 19 and worked for nine months as a photography apprentice in San Francisco. With financial assistance from his brother, he purchased a photographic tent and equipment and began working independently in the San Joaquin Valley. Traveling with his glass-plate photography equipment by donkey, Curtis photographed communities throughout the region.

Curtis established a base in Hanford and traveled between nearby towns, charging $1 for 8-by-10-inch portraits. His photographs also documented community activities and local scenes.

In 1883, Curtis met Maria Dewey, who worked at a millinery shop in Porterville. They married on March 29, 1884, in Visalia, and later moved to Traver, where Curtis opened a photography studio.

== Kaweah Colony ==
In 1886, Curtis joined the Kaweah Colony, a socialist cooperative associated with Burnette Haskell. The colony had filed claims under the Timber and Stone Act to land that included much of what later became the Giant Forest in Sequoia National Park. Curtis and his wife Maria worked on construction of a road along the North Fork of the Kaweah River intended to provide access to the colony's timber claims.

The colony's land claims were challenged by the United States General Land Office. Curtis subsequently left the colony and destroyed most of the glass-plate photographs he had made there.

== Comstock Mill ==
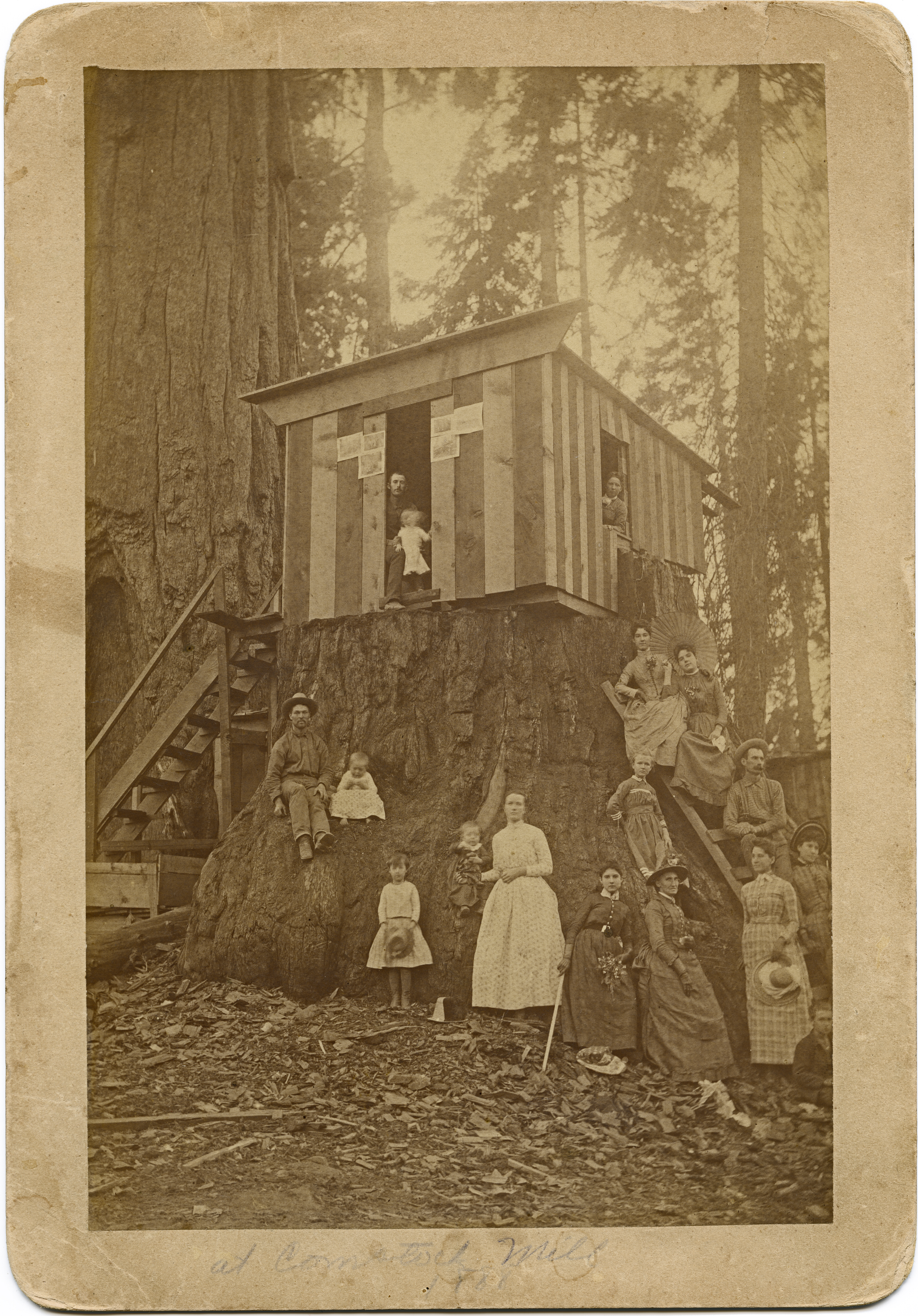
The C.C. Curtis family home and studio at the Comstock Mill at Big Stump in 1888.

Curtis visited Big Stump Grove in 1887 and returned the following summer after selling his photography studio. He and his family settled at the Comstock Mill, near present-day Lake Sequoia and Grant Grove.

Curtis built a one-room residence and photography studio on a giant sequoia stump measuring nearly 20 feet in diameter and about 10 feet above the ground. The structure was reached by a staircase and stood about 250 yards from the Mark Twain Tree. The family lived there during the summer of 1888.

While at the mill, Curtis photographed visitors at the General Grant Tree and elsewhere in Grant Grove. His photographs frequently included people posed beside giant sequoias, providing a visual indication of the trees' scale. The Comstock Mill was abandoned in 1888.

== Millwood ==
In 1885, Hiram C. Smith and A. D. Moore established the Kings River Lumber Company at Millwood. Curtis later established a photography studio there on a flat rock opposite the Sequoia Hotel. He photographed residents and visitors at nearby Grant Grove and among the stumps of logged giant sequoias.

Some felled sequoias had large undercuts that were used as photographic backdrops and became known as "picture trees". Between 1887 and 1893, Curtis divided his time between photographing the Sierra Nevada during the summer and working in the San Joaquin Valley during the winter.

== Exhibition trees ==
=== Mark Twain Tree ===
In 1891, the American Museum of Natural History acquired the rights to have the Mark Twain Tree felled for exhibition. Curtis photographed the felling, and his photographs were later exhibited at the museum. He also sold prints of the images.

=== General Noble Tree ===
In 1892, Curtis was contracted by the Kings River Lumber Company to photograph the felling of the General Noble Tree, which was cut for display at the 1893 World's Columbian Exposition in Chicago. Curtis traveled to Chicago intending to sell prints of his photographs. He brought approximately 50,000 prints but was denied a vendor booth and was unable to recover his investment.

== Later life ==
In 1891, Curtis and several former members of the Kaweah Colony established the Esperanza Land Improvement Company on the Kettleman Plains west of Hanford. Curtis and his family later settled at Esperanza, where they farmed wheat and Curtis reduced his photography work.

Curtis later moved to San Jose, where he worked at a spice mill, and then to San Francisco, where he worked for the Folger Coffee Company. During the fires following the 1906 San Francisco earthquake, he assisted in protecting the company's factory. He later settled in Pasadena and worked as a produce buyer. In 1932, Curtis and his wife Maria retired to Cottage Grove, Oregon, where she died later that year at age 68. Curtis subsequently remarried twice and died in 1956 at age 93.

Curtis retained many of his glass-plate negatives, which were later preserved by his grandson, Charles Curtis Annand. His photographs are held in the collections of UCLA, the National Park Service, and the Library of Congress.

== Image gallery ==
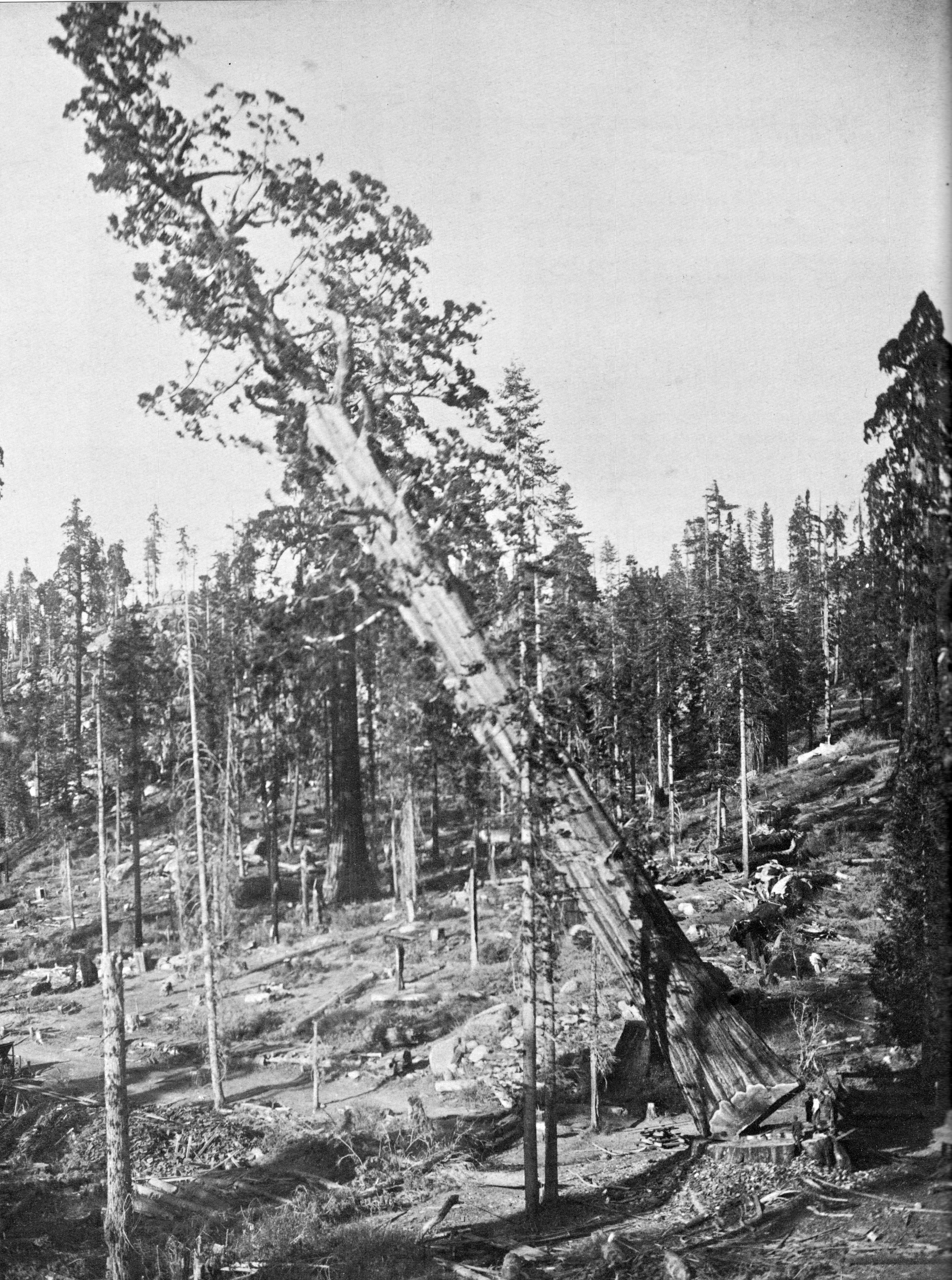
The felling of the Mark Twain Tree. C.C. Curtis. USA, 1891.

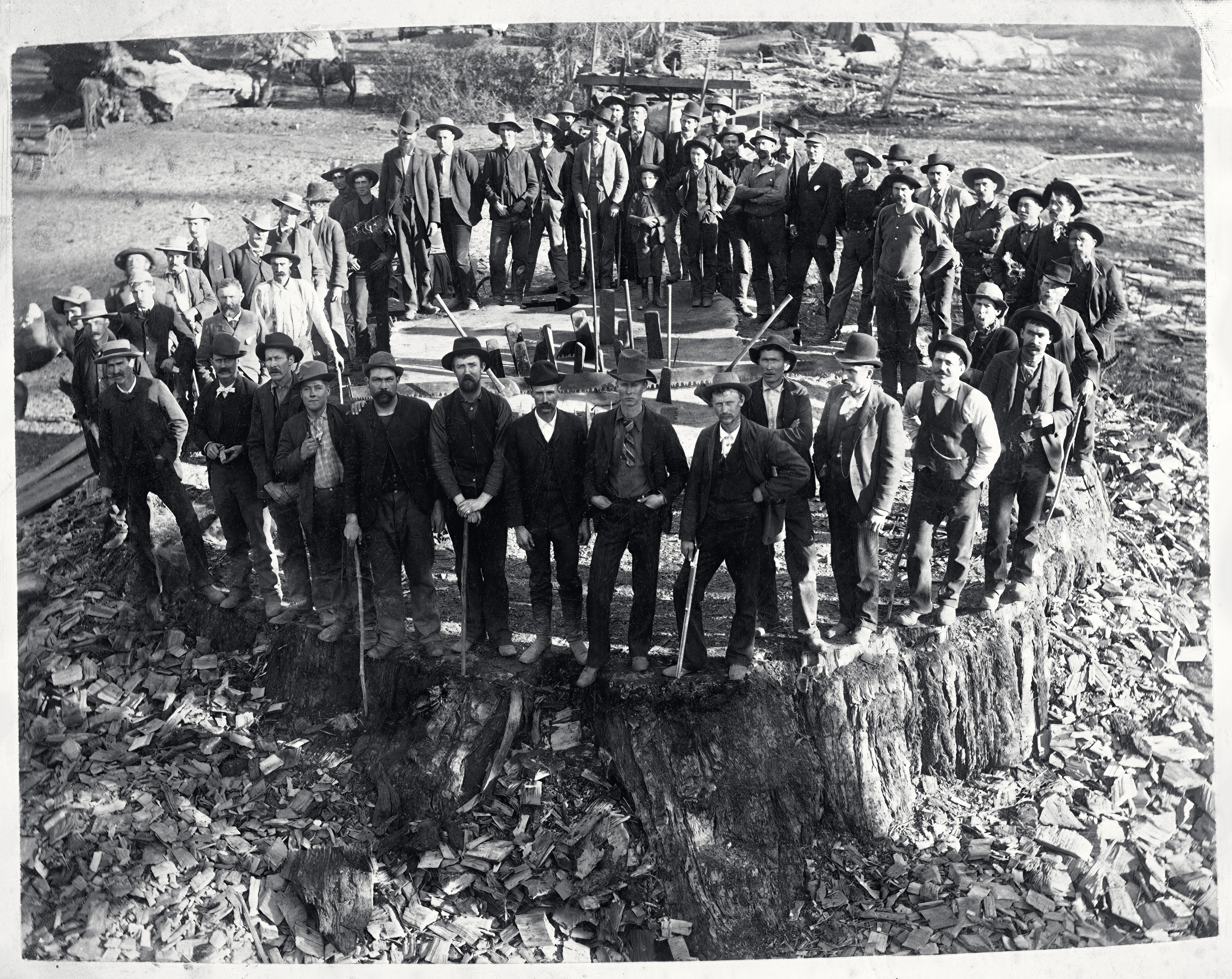
Fifty men stand on the massive stump of the Mark Twain Tree. C.C. Curtis. USA, 1891. National Park Service Gallery.

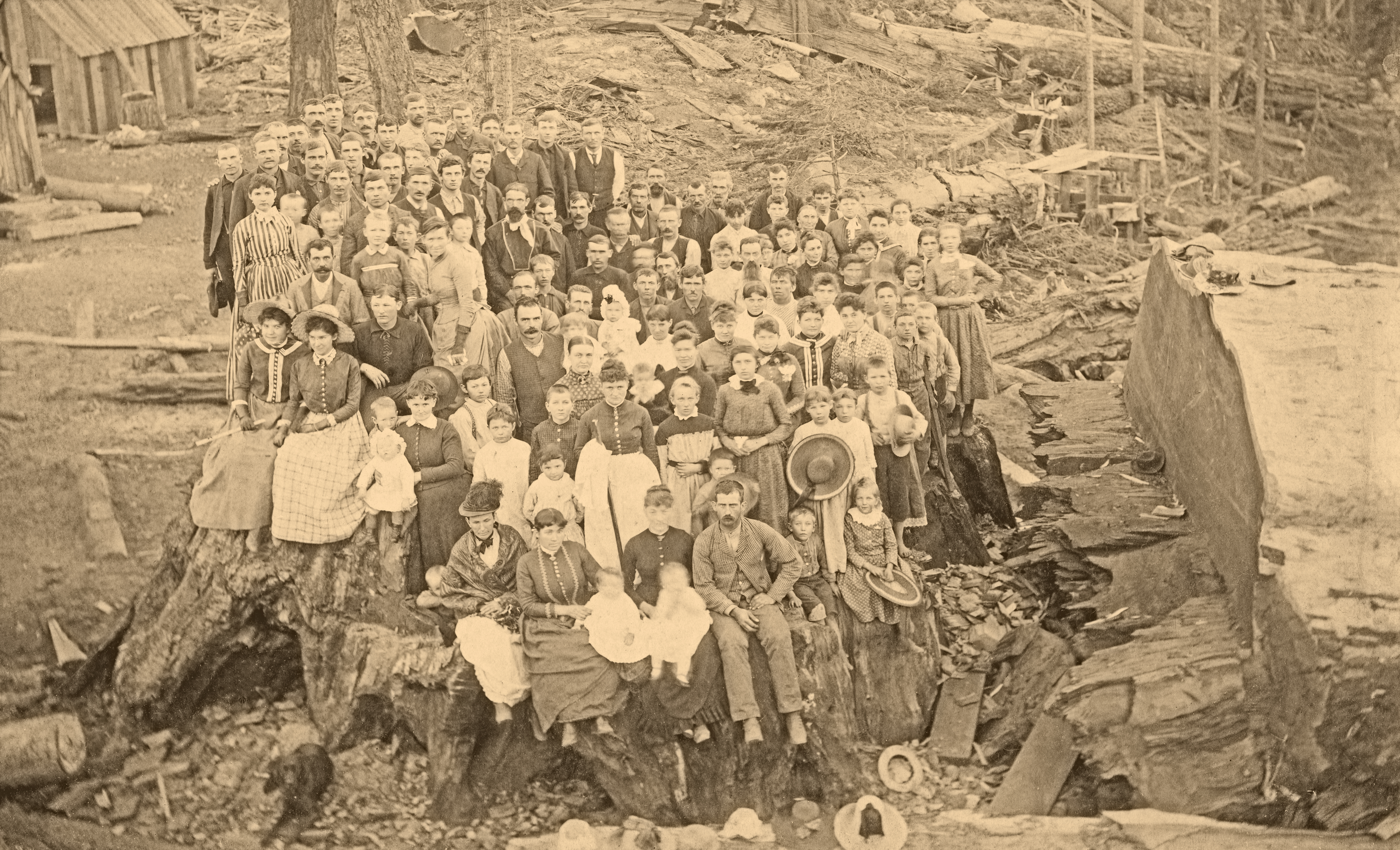
126 people on the top of a redwood stump Tulare Co. Cal. C.C. Curtis. USA, 1888.

== Bibliography ==
- McGee, Lizzie. Mills of the Sequoias, Visalia, California, Tulare County Historical Society, Historical Bulletin, March 1952
