= General Noble Tree =

Giant sequoia exhibition tree felled in 1892

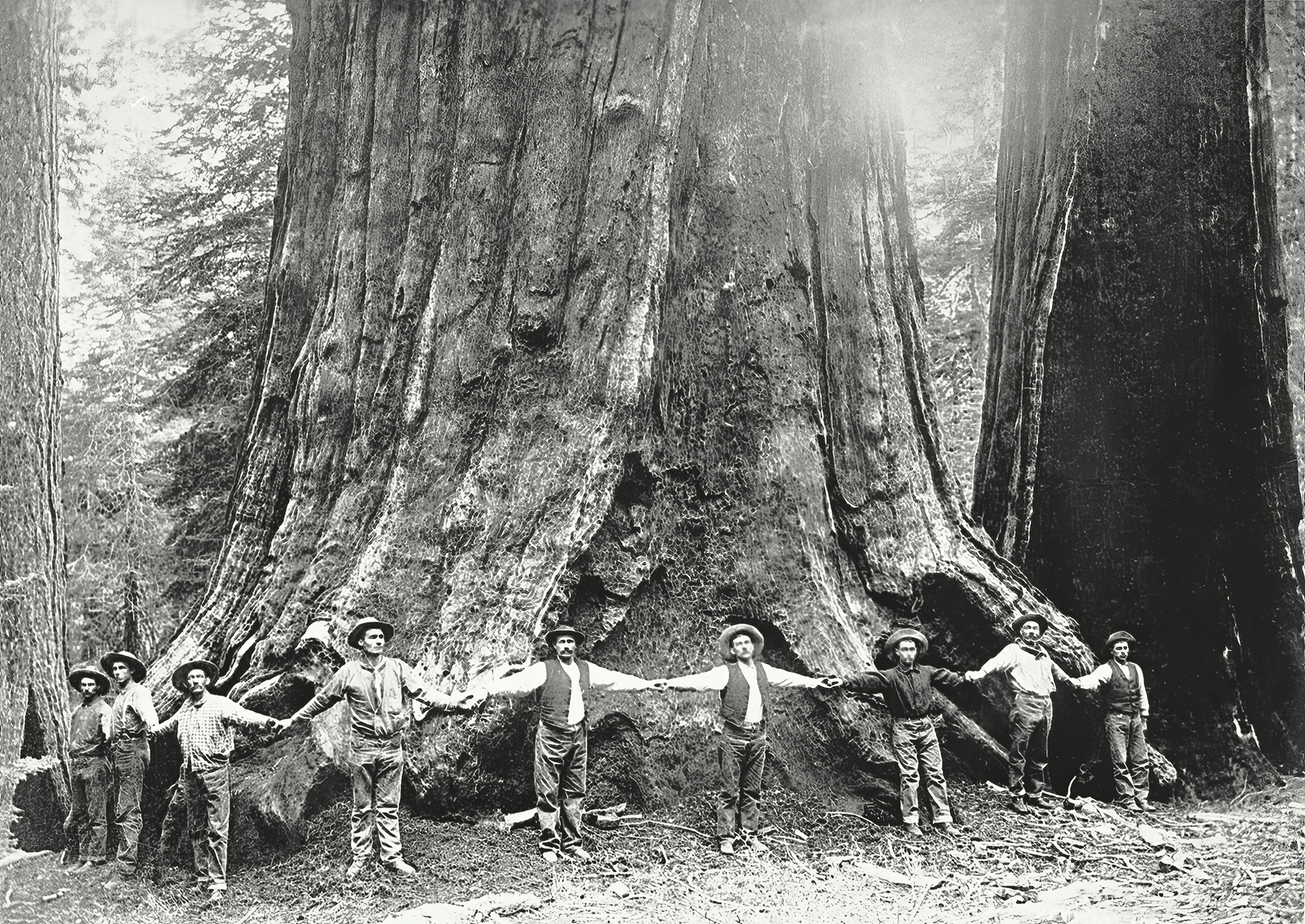
- The felling crew holds hands around the base of the General Noble.

- Location within California
- Species: Giant sequoia (Sequoiadendron giganteum)
- Coordinates: 36°47′35″N 118°58′53″W
- Diameter: 9 m (30 ft)

The General Noble Tree was a monumental giant sequoia (Sequoiadendron giganteum) situated in the Converse Basin Grove, within the boundaries of the Giant Sequoia National Monument, in Fresno County, California. It was believed to be the biggest tree in the world before it was felled in 1892 to become an exhibition tree at the World's Columbian Exposition in Chicago. It was the largest tree ever felled.

== Description ==
The General Noble Tree stood approximately 300 feet (91 m) tall and measured 95 feet (29 m) in circumference at ground level. It was the second-largest giant sequoia in Converse Basin Grove, after the Boole Tree, and was estimated to have ranked among the 30 largest giant sequoias by volume before it was felled.

The tree was named for Secretary of the Interior John Willock Noble, who had recommended the establishment of Sequoia National Park in 1890. Although the park protected many of the region's giant sequoias, the General Noble Tree stood outside its boundaries.

== Transportation ==
The King's River Lumber Company felled the General Noble Tree and divided its trunk into 46 sections for transport to Chicago. Some sections weighed more than four tons and were hauled from Converse Basin by specialized wagons pulled by teams of 16 mules. The sections were subsequently shipped by rail to Chicago in 11 railroad cars. The cutting, transportation, and installation of the tree cost $10,475.87.

Photographer C.C. Curtis documented the felling and transportation of the tree.

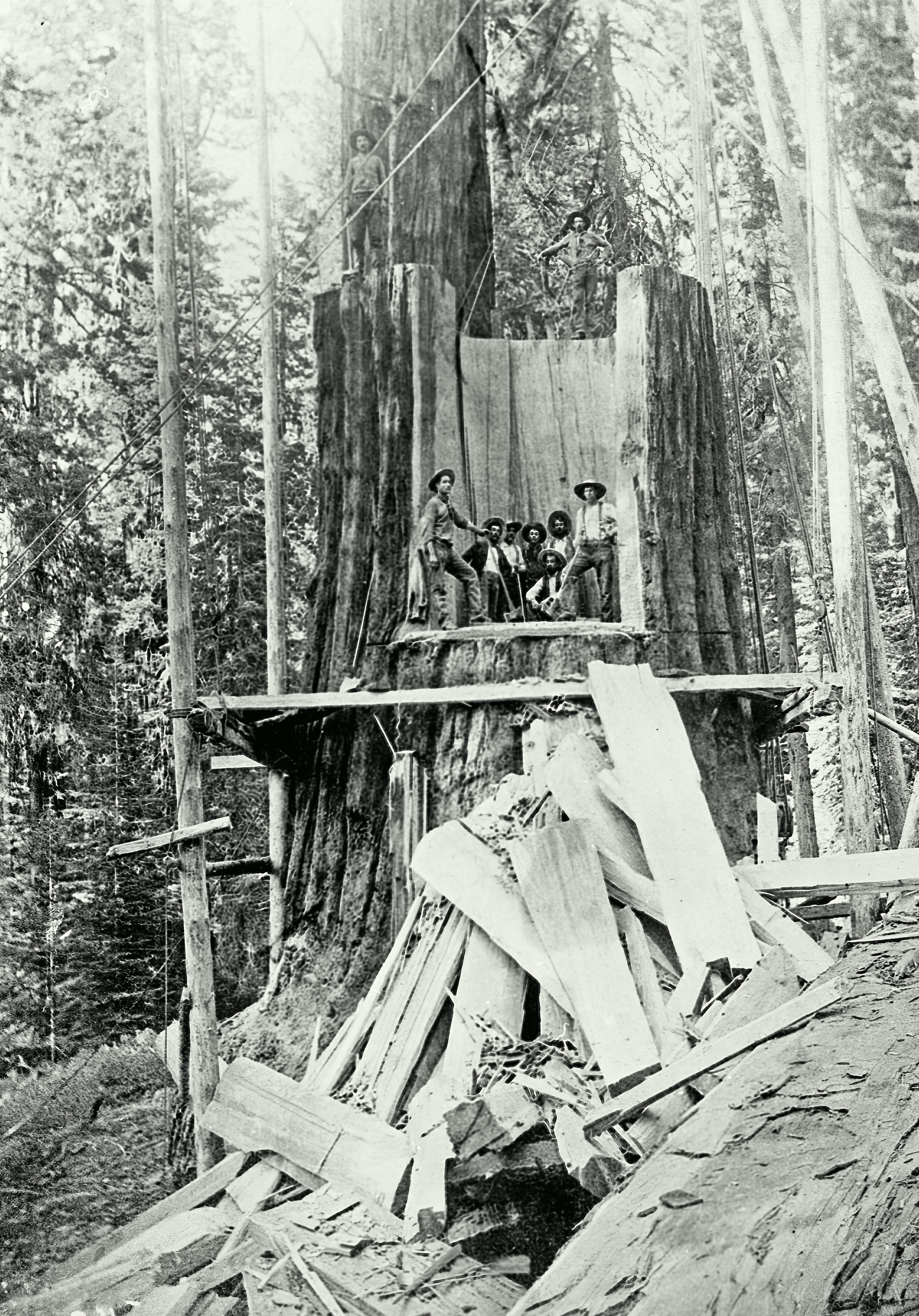
Jesse Pattee, a renowned logger, is the first man on the left.

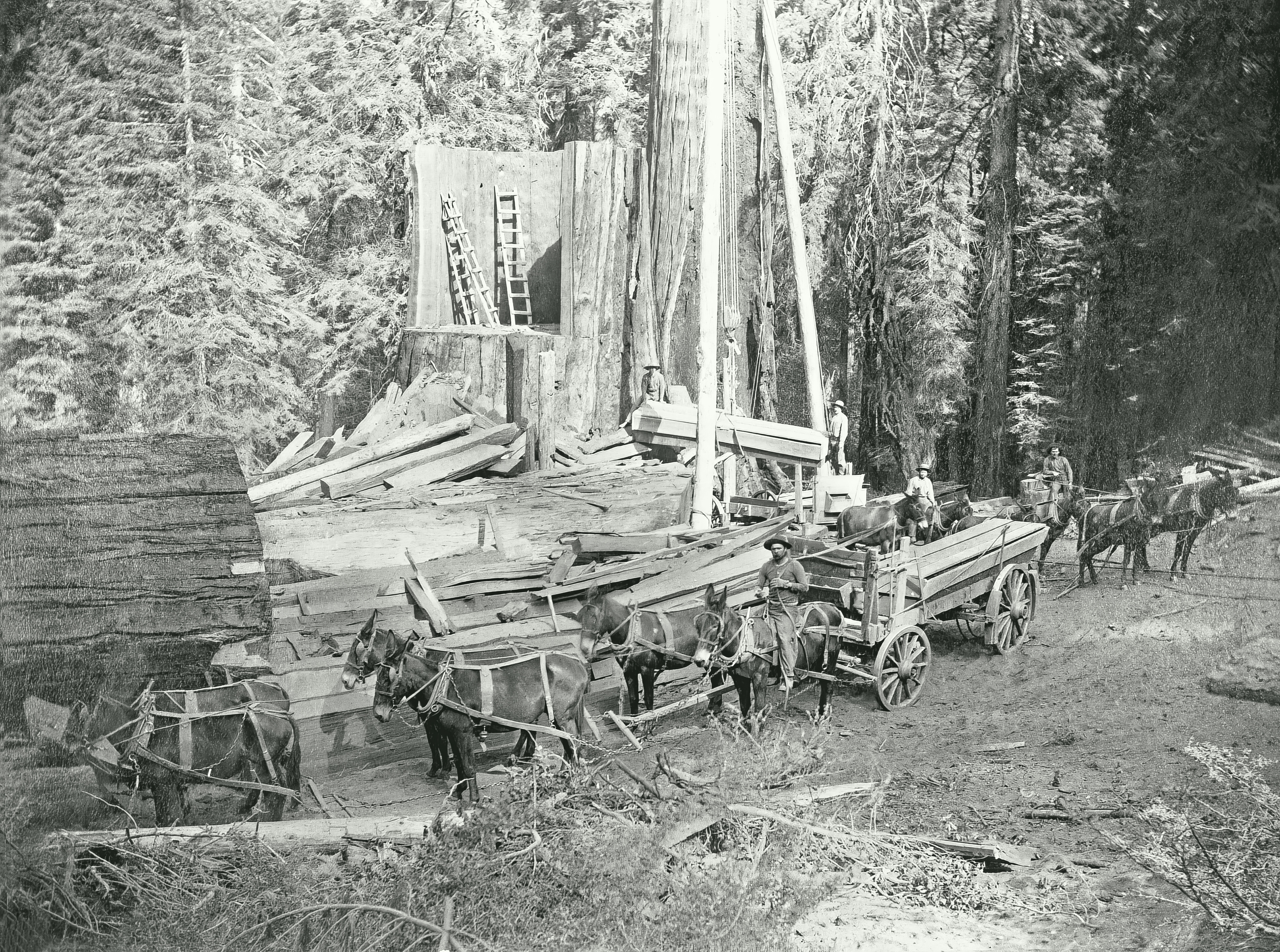
Loading the General Noble into a mule driven wagon.

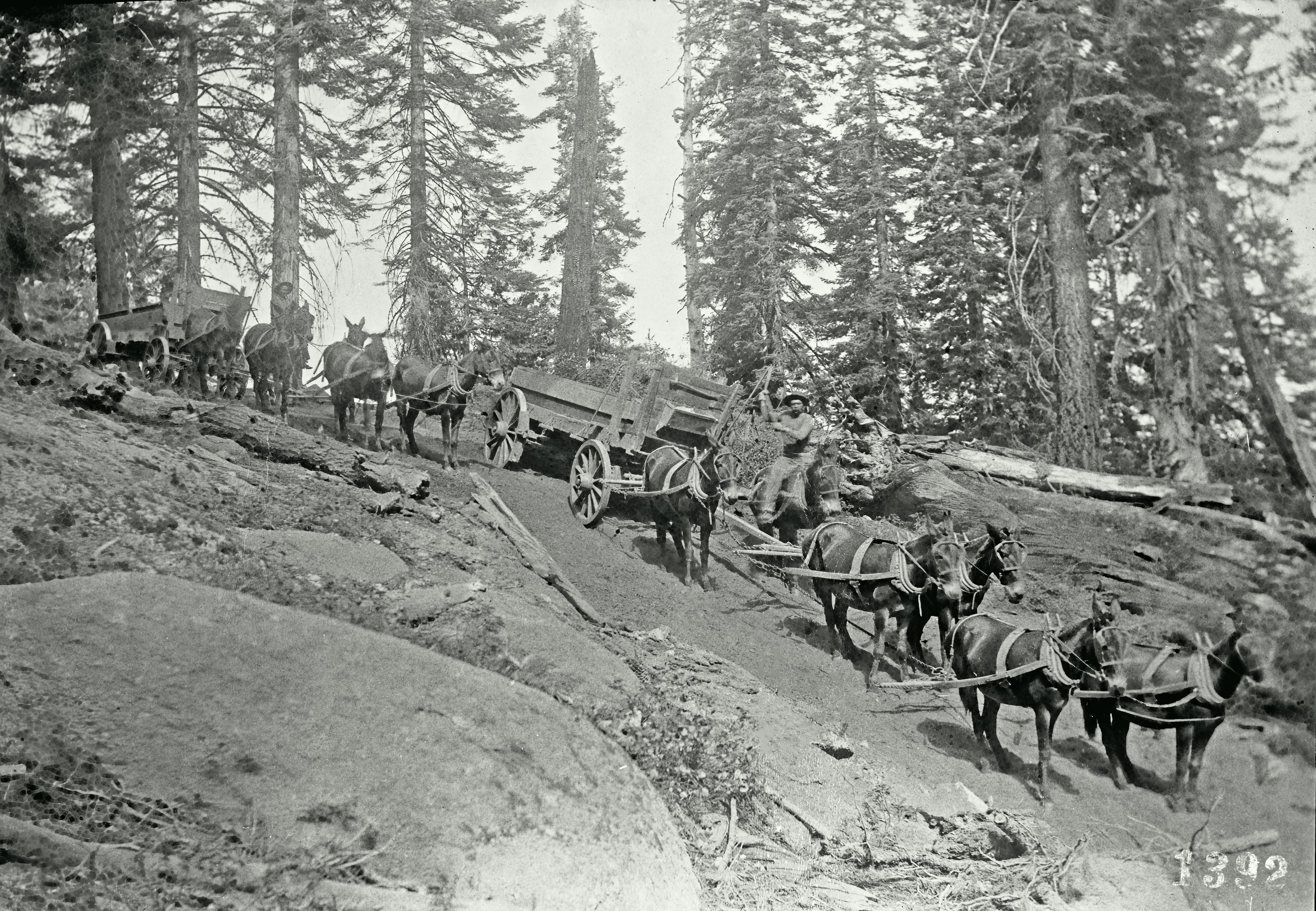
The painstaking journey down the mountain.

== Display ==
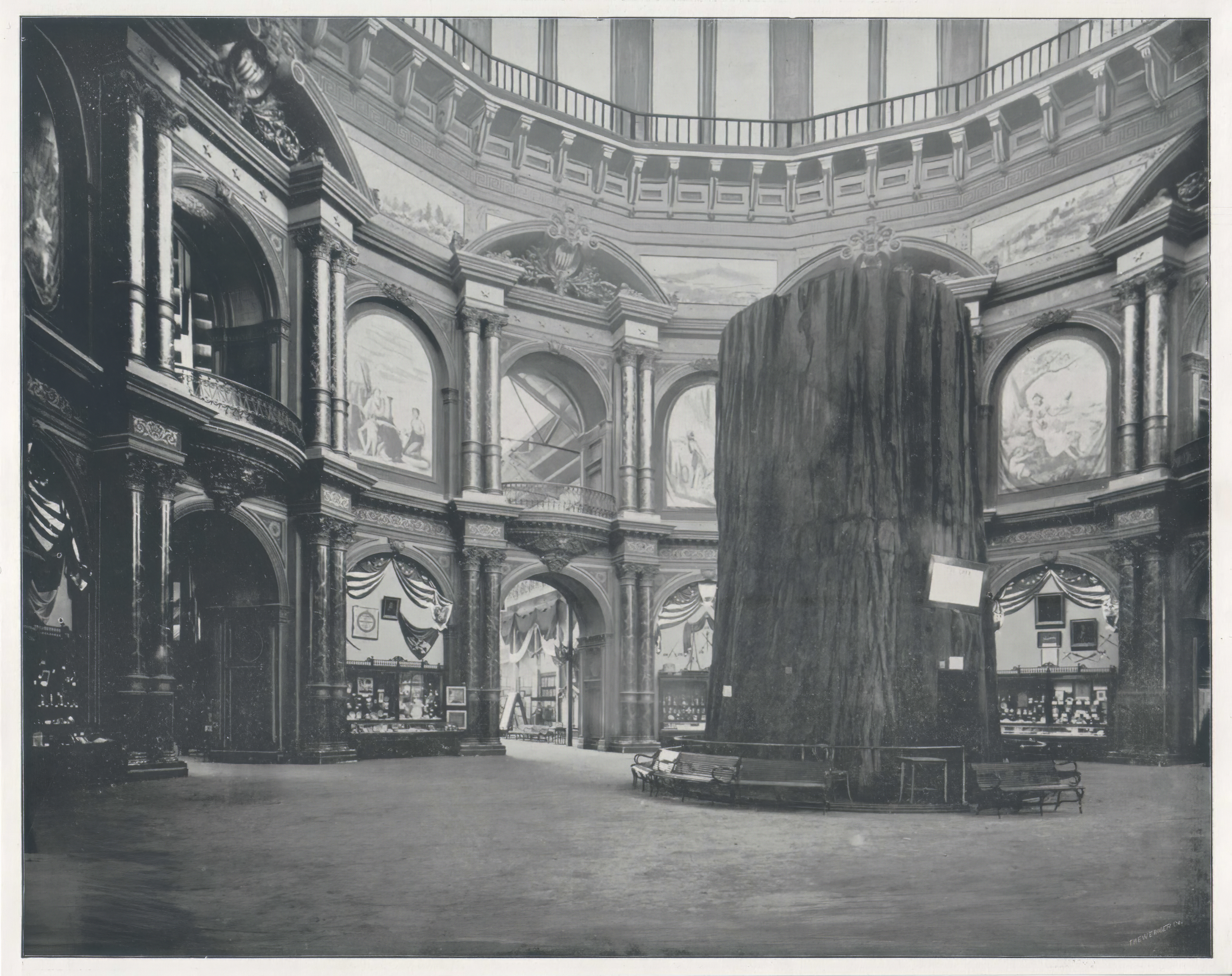
A section of General Noble on display at the 1893 World's Columbian Exposition.

Sections of the General Noble Tree were reassembled and displayed at the 1893 World's Columbian Exposition in Chicago. Contemporary accounts reported that some visitors doubted that a tree of its size could be genuine, and the exhibit became associated with the nickname "California Hoax".

After the exposition, portions of the tree were transported to Washington, D.C., where they were assembled into a structure known as the General Noble Redwood Tree House on the grounds of the main building of the United States Department of Agriculture. The structure remained on display for more than 40 years before deteriorating and being removed.

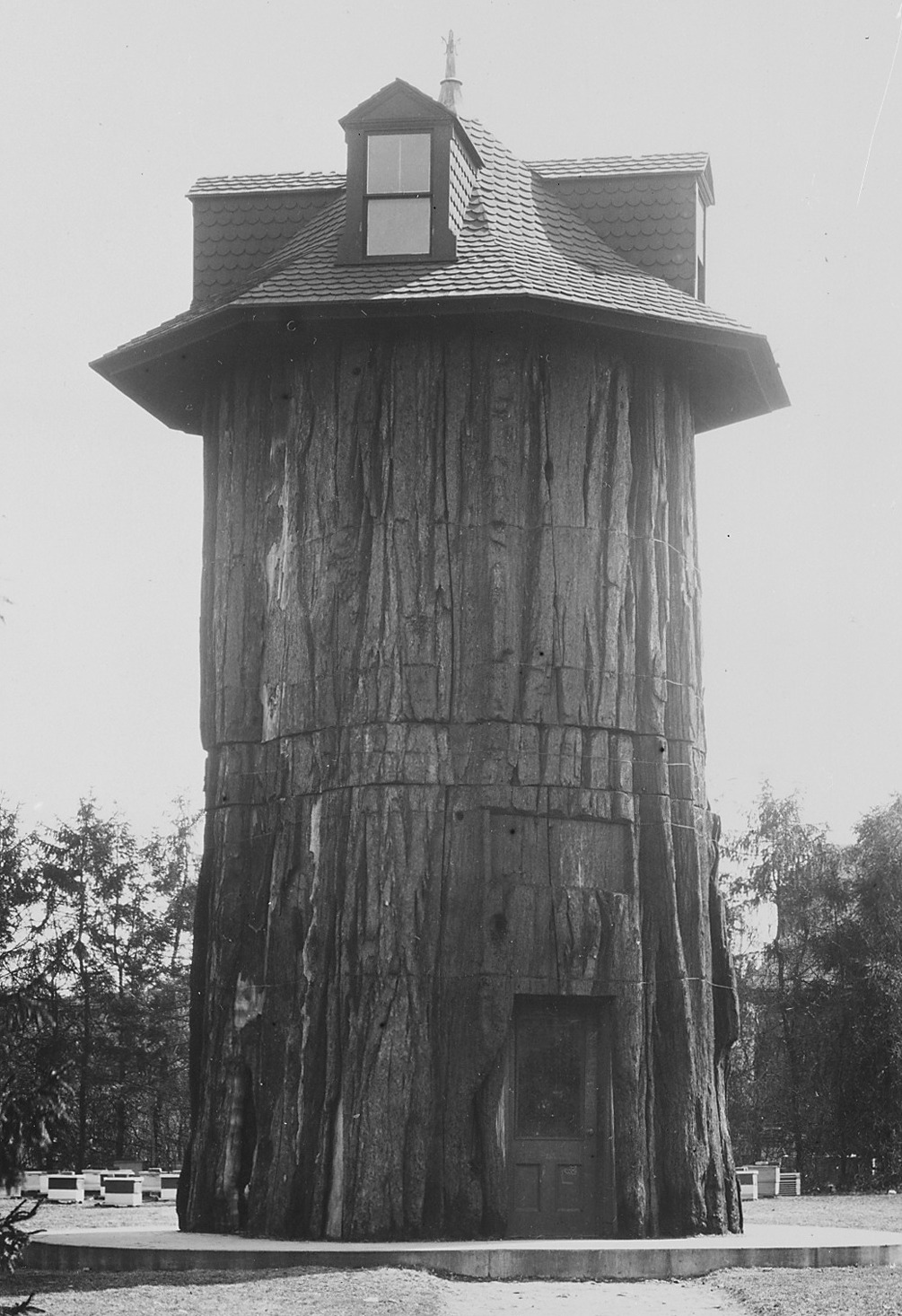
The General Noble Redwood Tree House, on display in Washington D.C..

== Legacy: Chicago Stump ==
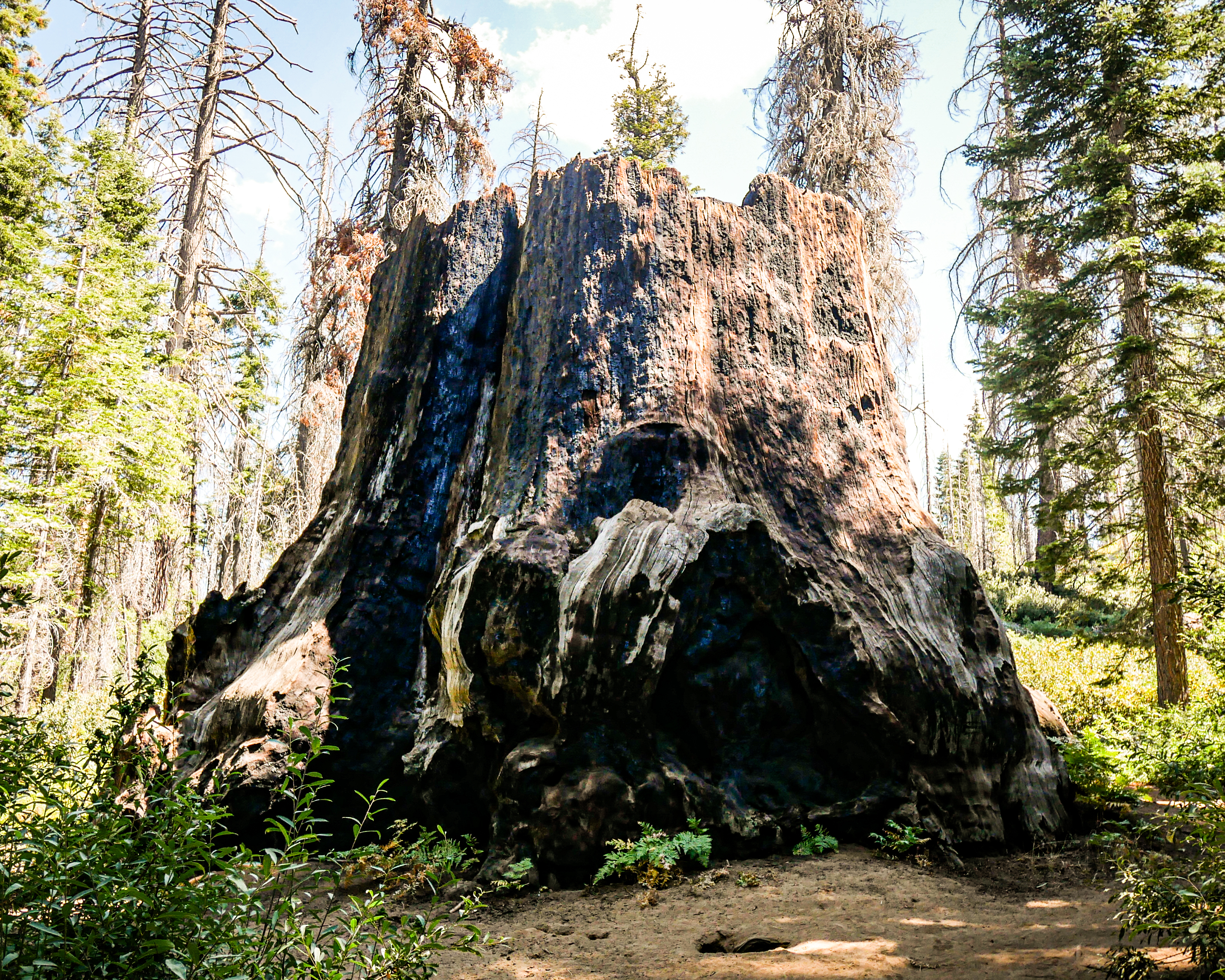
The Chicago Stump in 2022

The Chicago Stump is the remnant of the General Noble Tree, which was felled in 1892 for exhibition at the 1893 World's Columbian Exposition. The stump, approximately 20 feet (6.1 m) high, remains in Converse Basin Grove.

The stump is reached by the 0.5-mile (0.80 km) Chicago Stump Trail, about six miles north of Grant Grove Village.

During the 2015 Rough Fire, firefighters protected the stump with fire-resistant shelters.

== Dimensions ==
Height above base	300 ft	91.4 m
Circumference at ground	95 ft	29.0 m

== See also ==
- Mark Twain Tree
- Forest King
- List of largest giant sequoias
- List of individual trees
- Flora of the Sierra Nevada (United States)
