= Overlogging =

Environmental exploitation practice

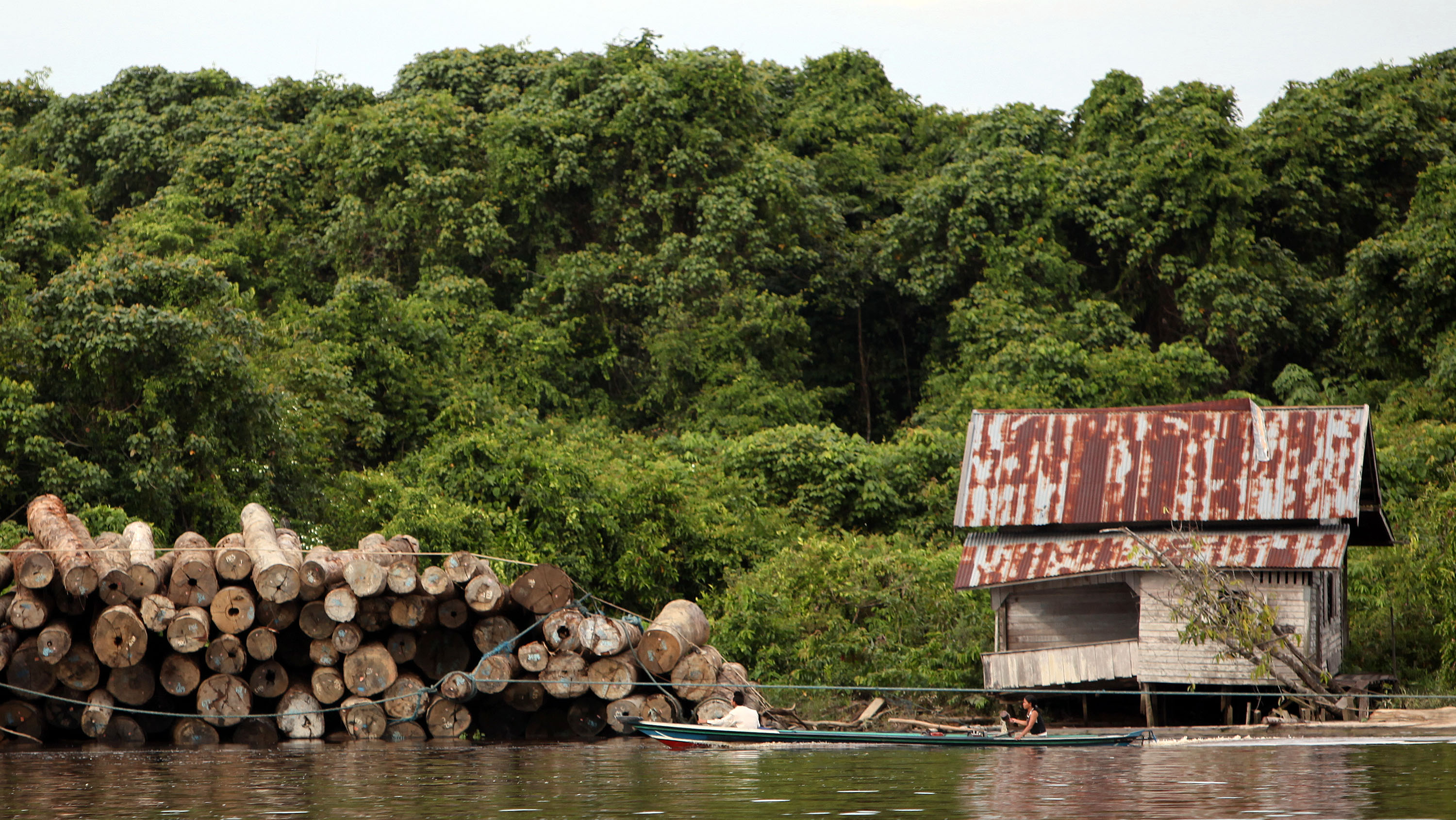
Local villagers float past a pile of illegally logged trees in Central Kalimantan, Indonesia

Overlogging is a form of overexploitation caused by legal or illegal logging activities that lead to unsustainable or irrecoverable deforestation and permanent habitat destruction for forest wildlife.

== Causes ==
The use of poor logging practices and heavy machinery leads to overlogged forests. Norman Myers argued that forms of environmental degradation like overlogging are a consequence of "perverse subsidies." The production of disposable tissues significantly contributes to the effects of overlogging.

In rural China, overlogging is related to the need for firewood as fuel. Overlogging is often associated with attempts at reducing the "Third world debt," although it is not restricted to developing countries.

In central Japan, forests located closer to power plants were found to be more vulnerable to overlogging.

== Effects ==
With the developed world's growing demand for pulp and paper, overlogging is an imminent threat to Earth's forests.

Overlogging has caused significant damage to dipterocarp forests in Southeast Asia, including in Vietnam. In the Philippines, overlogging has created brushlands comprising relict trees, shrubs, and grasses. As of 1994, overlogging had led to the loss of 1.2 million hectares of Russia's forests.

In China, tropical forests were affected by overlogging prior to the establishment of the People's Republic in 1949, and they were overlogged during the Cultural Revolution from 1966 to 1976. The process has created post-extraction secondary forests. At the Nature Reserve of Jinyun Mountain in Chongqing, overlogging affects the growth of Phyllostachys pubescens (giant bamboo). It is also a problem in the Karakoram and Kunlun Mountains, and it has caused flooding in the Min River Area of Fujian.

== Restoration ==
The restoration of overlogged forests can be important to the conservation of biodiversity or the availability of natural resources like water and carbon for local populations.

The effects of overlogging can be mitigated by setting aside profits for forest rehabilitation, a practice which is also economically profitable. Enrichment planting, or planting trees in degraded forests, is a form of artificial regeneration that has been employed in East Kalimantan and South Kalimantan, Indonesia. A logging quota was established in China in 1987; it has stopped deforestation and degradation but has not led to forest regeneration.

In 1996, in response to activism regarding overlogging by corporations in Malaysia, the primary industries minister led a forestry mission to see the impact.

== Representations ==
The works of Frederic Edwin Church, a 19th-century American painter who often portrayed the progress of industrialization in his landscapes, indicate that he was "aware that overlogging led to erosion and the pollution of streams."

== See also ==
- Environmental impact of paper
- Overfishing
- Overgrazing
