= Forest King =

Giant sequoia exhibition tree felled in 1870

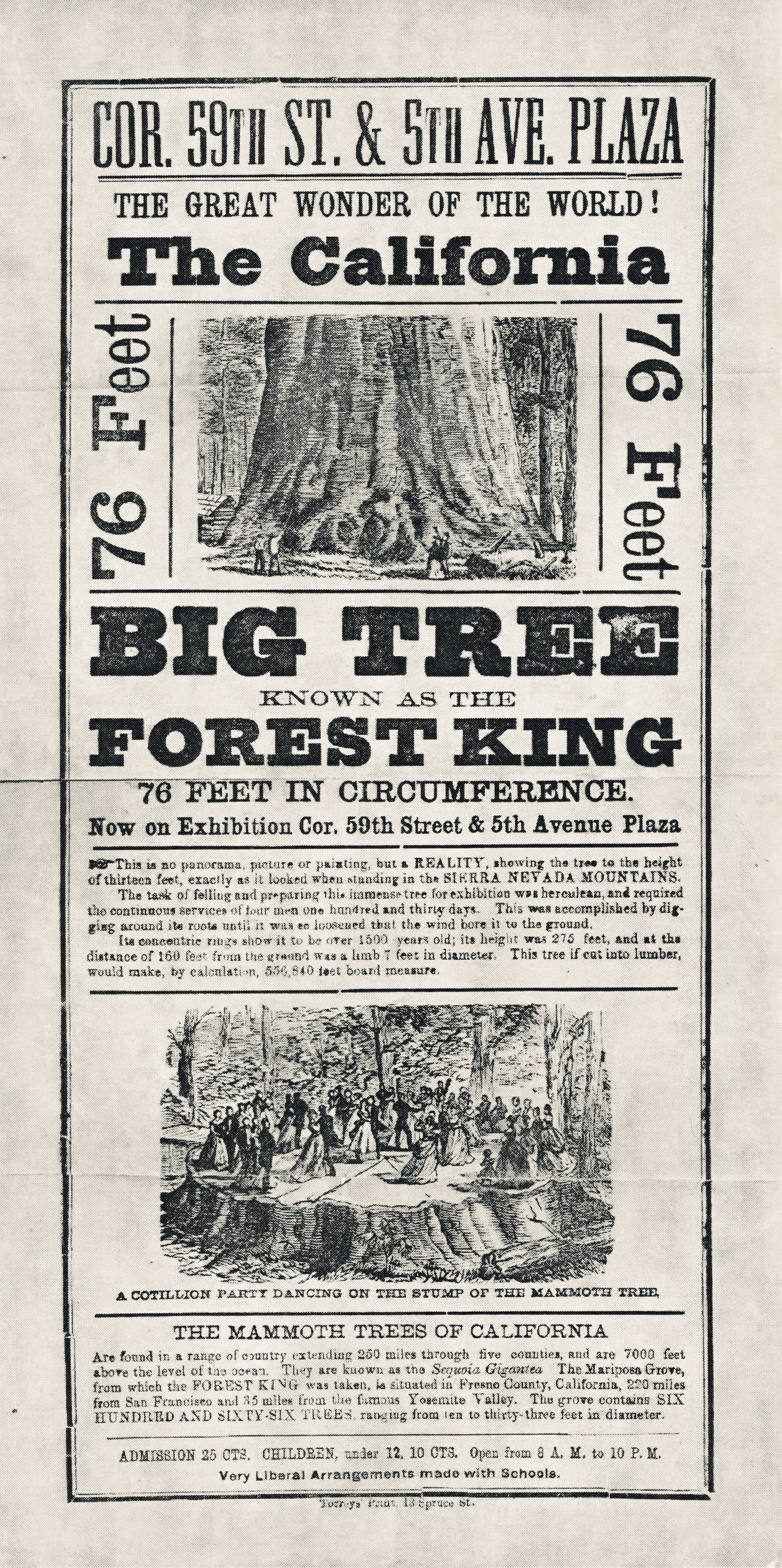
Handbill for The Forest King, a giant sequoia exhibit tree, from 1870.

The Forest King was a giant sequoia in Nelder Grove, California, that was felled in 1870 and prepared for exhibition. A section of the trunk was transported to Stockton, California, and later toured cities including Chicago, Cincinnati, and New York City. P. T. Barnum acquired the exhibit in 1871 and displayed it at his New York attractions before giving it to publisher Frank Leslie in 1874. Leslie installed the exhibit at his estate in Saratoga Springs, New York. The stump of the Forest King in Nelder Grove was rediscovered in 2003.

== History ==
=== Barnum and the bark exhibit ===
In April 1870, William Stegman brought a 29.5-inch (75 cm)-thick section of giant sequoia bark from Nelder Grove to Mariposa, where it was exhibited at a local saloon. On May 31, P. T. Barnum, traveling through Mariposa on his way to Yosemite Valley and the Mariposa Grove, purchased the bark from Stegman for $100.

Later that month, the Mariposa Free Press reported that Barnum had consulted engineers about transporting a larger section of a giant sequoia. Their estimate assumed a 100-foot (30 m) section weighing about 200 tons and requiring approximately 240 days to reach navigable water in the San Joaquin Valley.

Barnum instead exhibited the bark section, first in San Francisco and later in New York.

=== Felling and sectioning ===
In 1870, William Stegman and William Sneidker selected a giant sequoia in Nelder Grove for an exhibition they planned to transport and reassemble elsewhere. The tree was reported to stand about 260 feet (79 m) tall, with a diameter of 24 feet (7.3 m) and a circumference of approximately 75 feet (23 m).

Workers excavated around the base of the tree and cut through its roots before sawing through the trunk about 30 inches (76 cm) above the roots. A 12-foot (3.7 m) section of the trunk was then prepared for exhibition. Much of the heartwood was removed, in part using blasting powder, leaving an outer shell of wood and bark that was divided into numbered sections so it could be transported and reassembled.

Contemporary accounts reported that three men spent five and a half days excavating around the tree and about 30 days preparing the exhibition section. The sections left Nelder Grove in September 1870 and were hauled toward Stockton using five wagons and 14 yoke of oxen. The journey covered approximately 150 miles (240 km) and included an overturned wagon while descending from the mountains.

=== Travel and exhibition ===
The Forest King was first exhibited in Stockton, California, in October 1870, in a tent on a vacant lot at the corner of Main and San Joaquin streets. The Daily San Joaquin Republican referred to the exhibit as "A Forest King," the name by which the tree subsequently became known. Admission was 25 cents, while schoolchildren were admitted free.

Promotional material for the exhibit described the tree as coming from the better-known Mariposa Grove and gave its height as 360 feet (110 m), about 100 feet (30 m) greater than contemporary measurements of the Forest King.

After the Stockton exhibition, Stegman and Sneidker sold the exhibit to Samuel A. Pearson of San Francisco and Samuel Miller of Stockton. Under its new owners, the Forest King traveled by rail to cities including Chicago, Cincinnati, and New York City. It was displayed for four weeks at Arcade Hall in Chicago during the 1870 Christmas season and later at Wiswell's Art Gallery in Cincinnati. In New York, it was exhibited near Central Park at Fifth Avenue and 59th Street.

=== P.T. Barnum in New York ===
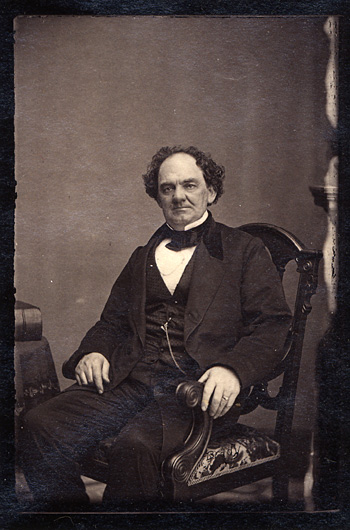
In 1871, P.T. Barnum bought the tree known as the Forest King after abandoning plans to acquire a giant sequoia in 1870.

In November 1871, P. T. Barnum acquired the Forest King exhibit and incorporated it into his winter show at the Empire Rink in New York City. Barnum opened the season there on November 13, 1871, and advertised the Forest King as a major attraction. Promotional material described the tree as 360 feet (110 m) tall and about 1,900 years old. The Forest King was displayed alongside the giant sequoia bark section Barnum had purchased from William Stegman in Mariposa the previous year.

Barnum later gave the Forest King to publisher Frank Leslie. Leslie had the exhibit mounted and roofed on his estate near Saratoga Springs, New York, where it was used as a summer house.

The present location of the Forest King exhibit is unknown. In Nelder Grove, the stump of the original tree was rediscovered in 2003 and identified using photographs taken during its felling in 1870.

== Conservation response ==
Plans to cut a giant sequoia in Nelder Grove for exhibition drew criticism in California newspapers in 1870. The Tulare Times opposed the proposed felling and called for protection of the remaining groves.

At the time, protection of giant sequoia groves was limited. The Mariposa Grove had been protected under the Yosemite Grant of 1864, which set aside Yosemite Valley and the grove for public use and preservation. Most other giant sequoia groves remained outside protected lands.

In 1874, California enacted legislation prohibiting the cutting or stripping of giant sequoias more than 16 feet (4.9 m) in diameter in Fresno, Tulare, and Kern counties. The law did not prevent extensive logging of giant sequoias during the following decades, including in Nelder Grove and Converse Basin Grove.

== Dimensions ==
Height above base	260 ft	79.2 m
Circumference at ground	75 ft	22.9 m
Diameter	24 ft	7.3 m

== Bibliography ==
- Kruska, Dennis G. (1985). Sierra Nevada Big Trees: History of the Exhibitions, 1850-1903: Los Angeles, California: Dawson's Book Shop.
- Lowe, Gary D. (2004). The Big Tree Exhibits of 1870-1871 and the Roots of the Giant Sequoia Preservation Movement. Livermore, California: Lowebros Publishing.
