= Mark Twain Tree =

Giant sequoia exhibition tree felled in 1891

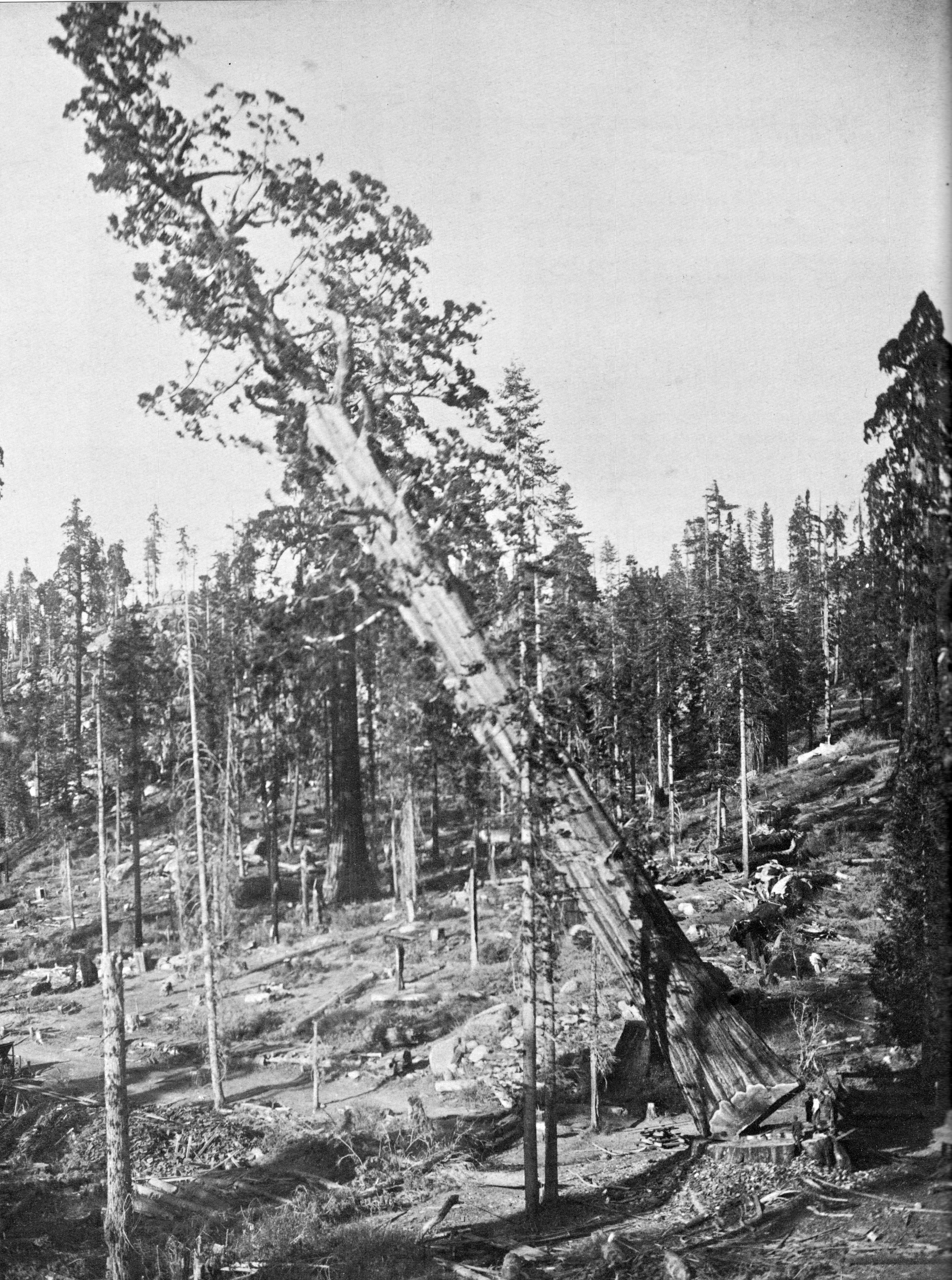
- The Mark Twain Tree falling in what is now Kings Canyon National Park

- Location within California
- Species: Giant sequoia (Sequoiadendron giganteum)
- Coordinates: 36°43′01″N 118°57′54″W
- Diameter: 4.8 m (16 ft)

The Mark Twain Tree was a giant sequoia tree located in the Big Stump Forest of Kings Canyon National Park. It was named after the American writer and humorist Mark Twain. It had a diameter of 16 feet (4.9 meters) and was 1,341 years old when it was felled in 1891 for the American Museum of Natural History as an exhibition tree.

The process of felling the tree took 13 days and was carried out by lumbermen Bill Mills and S.D. Phips, with assistance from Barney and John Lukey. The tree was later shipped to the American Museum of Natural History in New York and the British Museum (Natural History) in London at the expense of Collis P. Huntington, the president of the Southern Pacific. Despite the establishment of the Sequoia National Park, access to the sequoia groves was difficult and the existence of such large trees was not widely believed at the time.

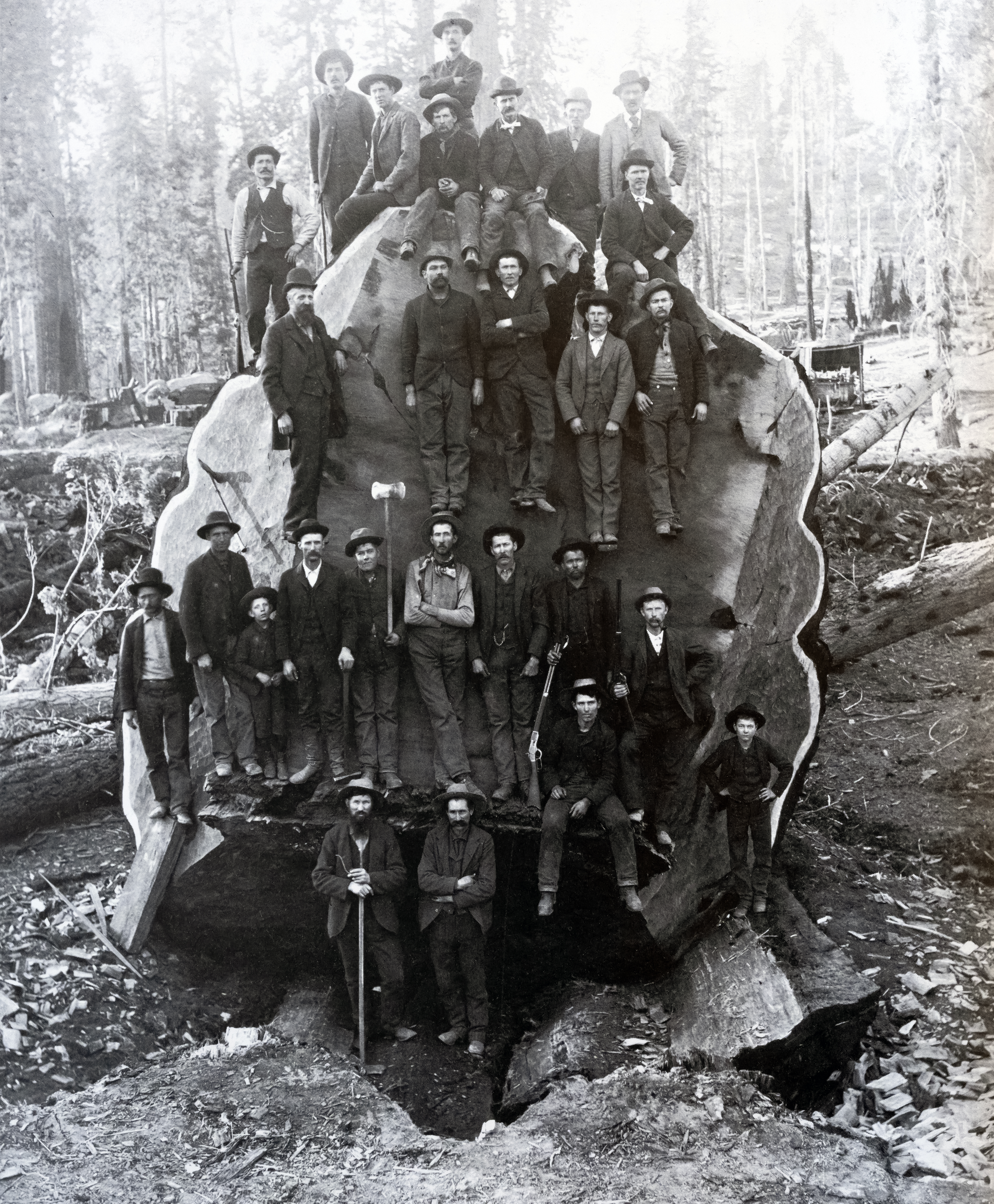
The end view of the Mark Twain Tree when it was felled in 1891

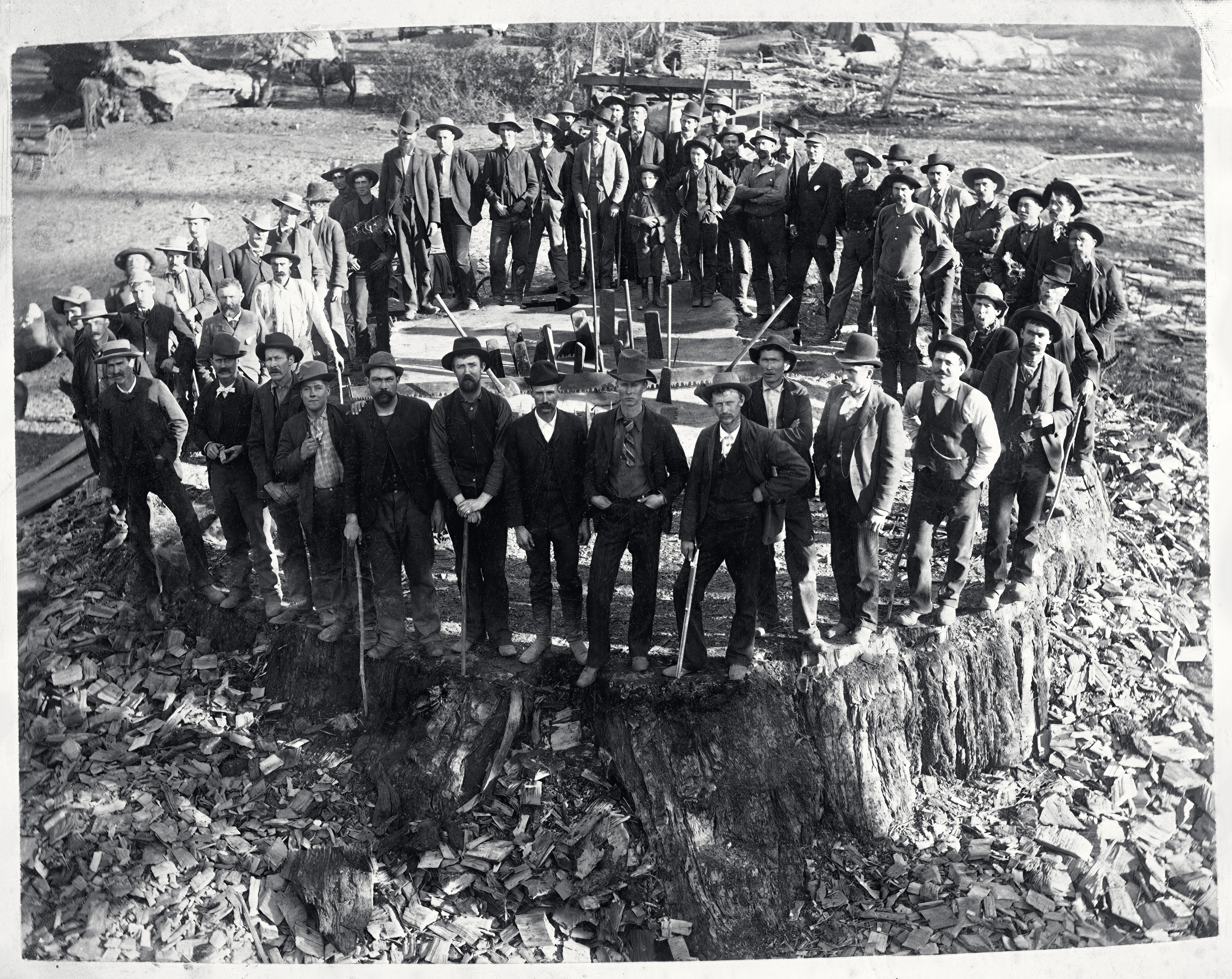
Fifty men stand on the massive stump of the Mark Twain Tree

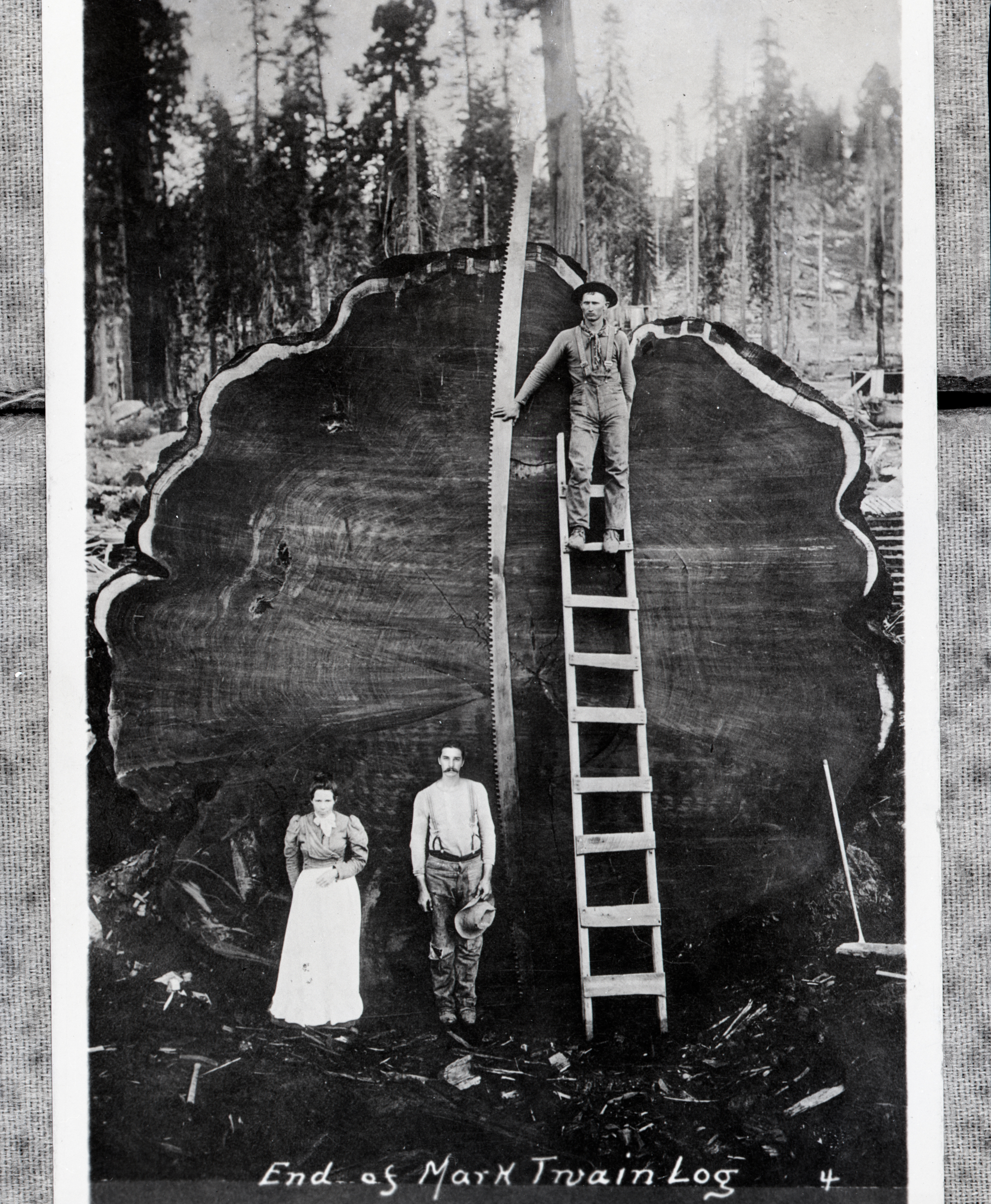
Diameter of Mark Twain Tree after it was cut

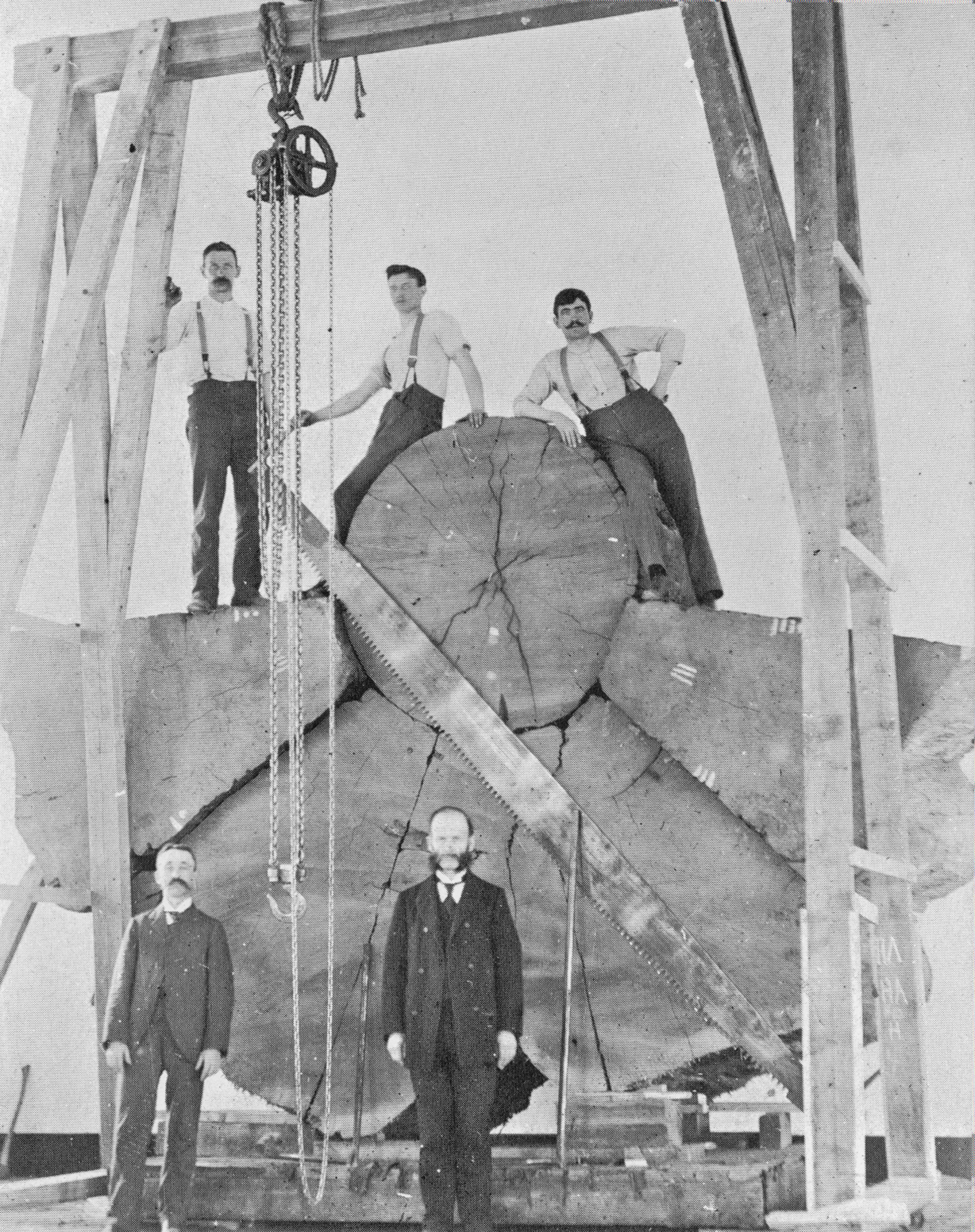
Assembling the trunk section of the Mark Twain Tree for display in New York in 1892

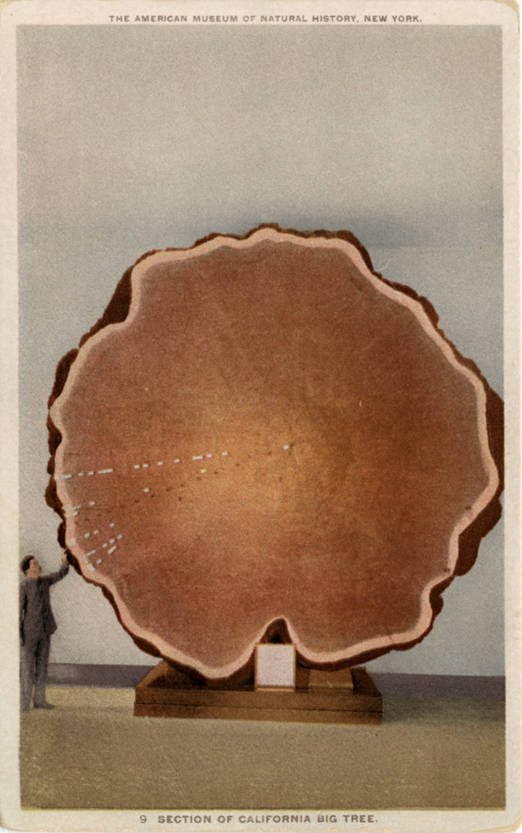
Vintage postcard.

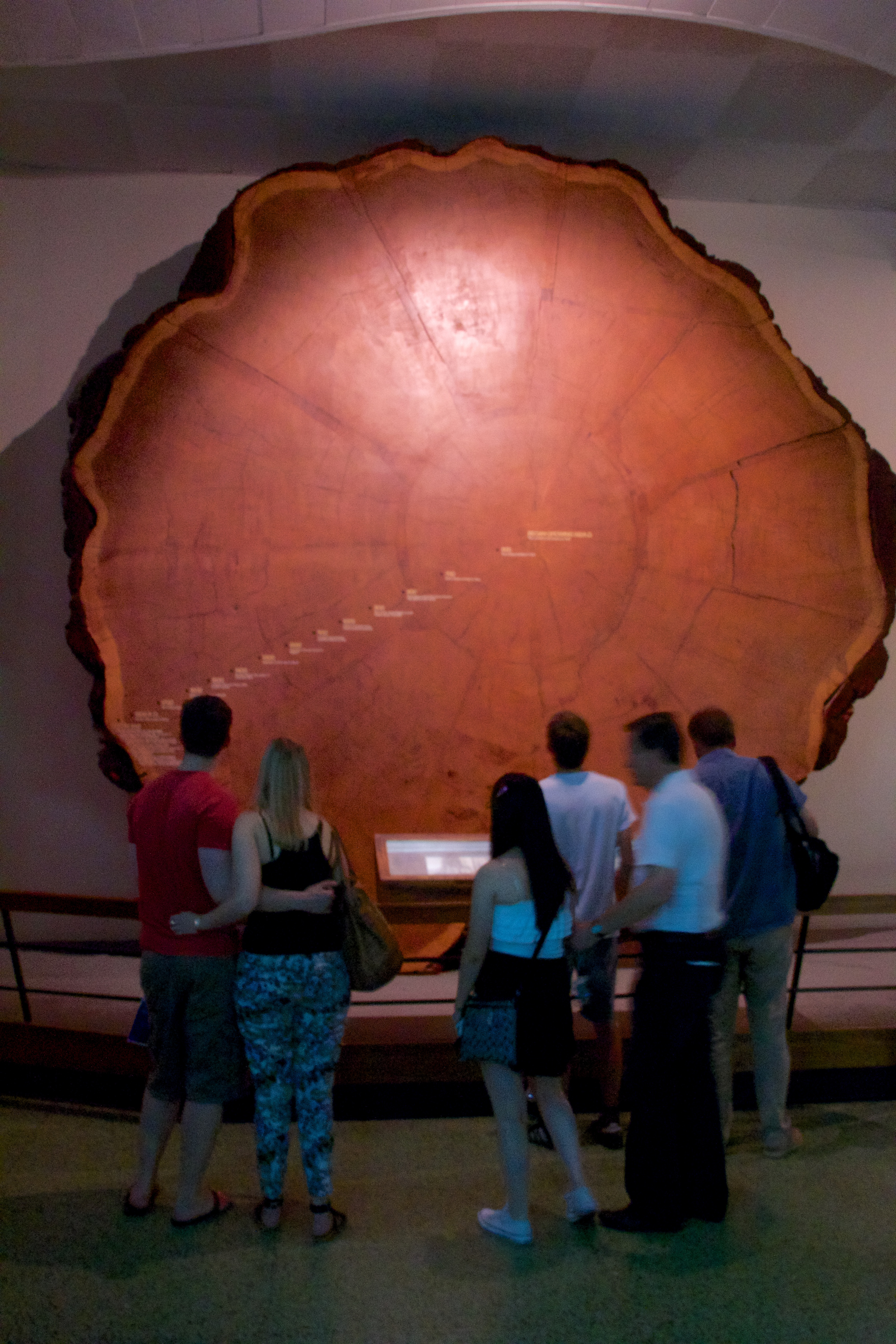
The Mark Twain Tree display at the American Museum of Natural History in 2012

== The remaining stump ==
The residual stump of the Mark Twain Tree is preserved as part of the Big Stump Picnic Area in Kings Canyon National Park.

== See also ==
- List of largest giant sequoias
- List of individual trees
