= Converse Basin Grove =

Giant sequoia grove in Fresno County, California, United States

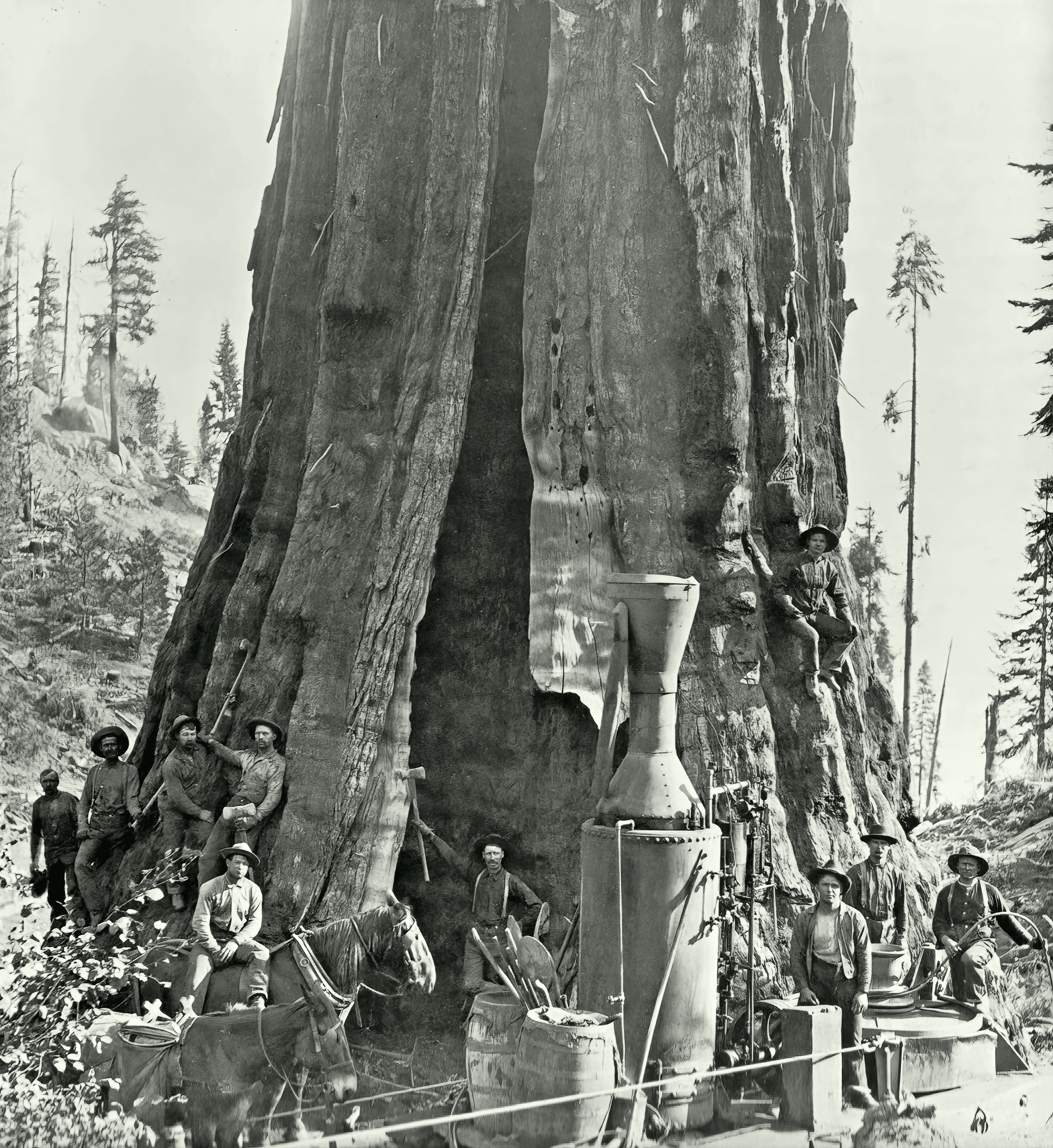
- A steam donkey crew at the Boole Tree, 1894.

- Location within California

Geography
- Location: Fresno County, California, United States
- Coordinates: 36°48′00″N 118°58′00″W
- Elevation: 5,900–6,600 ft (1,800–2,000 m)
- Area: 4,666 acres (18.88 km^{2})

Ecology
- Dominant tree species: Sequoiadendron giganteum

Converse Basin Grove is a grove of giant sequoia (Sequoiadendron giganteum) trees in the Giant Sequoia National Monument in the Sierra Nevada, in Fresno County, California, 5 miles (8 km) north of General Grant Grove, just outside Kings Canyon National Park. Once home to one of the largest populations of giant sequoias in the world, and covering 4,600 acres (19 km^{2}), the grove was overlogged by the Sanger Lumber Company at the turn of the 20th century. The logging of an estimated 8,000 giant sequoias, many of which were over 2,000 years old, removed most of the grove's mature giant sequoias and sharply altered its old-growth forest structure.

The U.S. Forest Service acquired Converse Basin in 1935, and subsequent management included efforts at restoration. A young forest regenerated after logging, but wildfire repeatedly interrupted its development. The 1955 McGee Fire burned much of the recovering forest. The Forest Service then established plantations in heavily burned areas, while fire exclusion allowed surface and ladder fuels to accumulate. The Rough Fire burned through the grove in 2015. Converse Basin continues to regenerate and has been used to study forest resilience and restoration.

Converse Basin Grove is home to several notable giant sequoia trees, including the Boole Tree, the sixth largest of its kind in the world, and the Chicago Stump, the remains of the General Noble Tree which was cut down for the 1893 World's Columbian Exposition. Another notable tree in the grove is the Muir Snag, which is believed to have been 3,500 years old at the time of its death, making it one of the oldest known giant sequoias.

== History ==
=== Eponym ===
Converse Basin was named after Charles Porter Converse. Converse was a founder of the Kings River Lumber Company and had planned to log the area in the 1860s. However, an economic recession interrupted Converse's plans. He left the company shortly after its founding.

=== Logging era ===
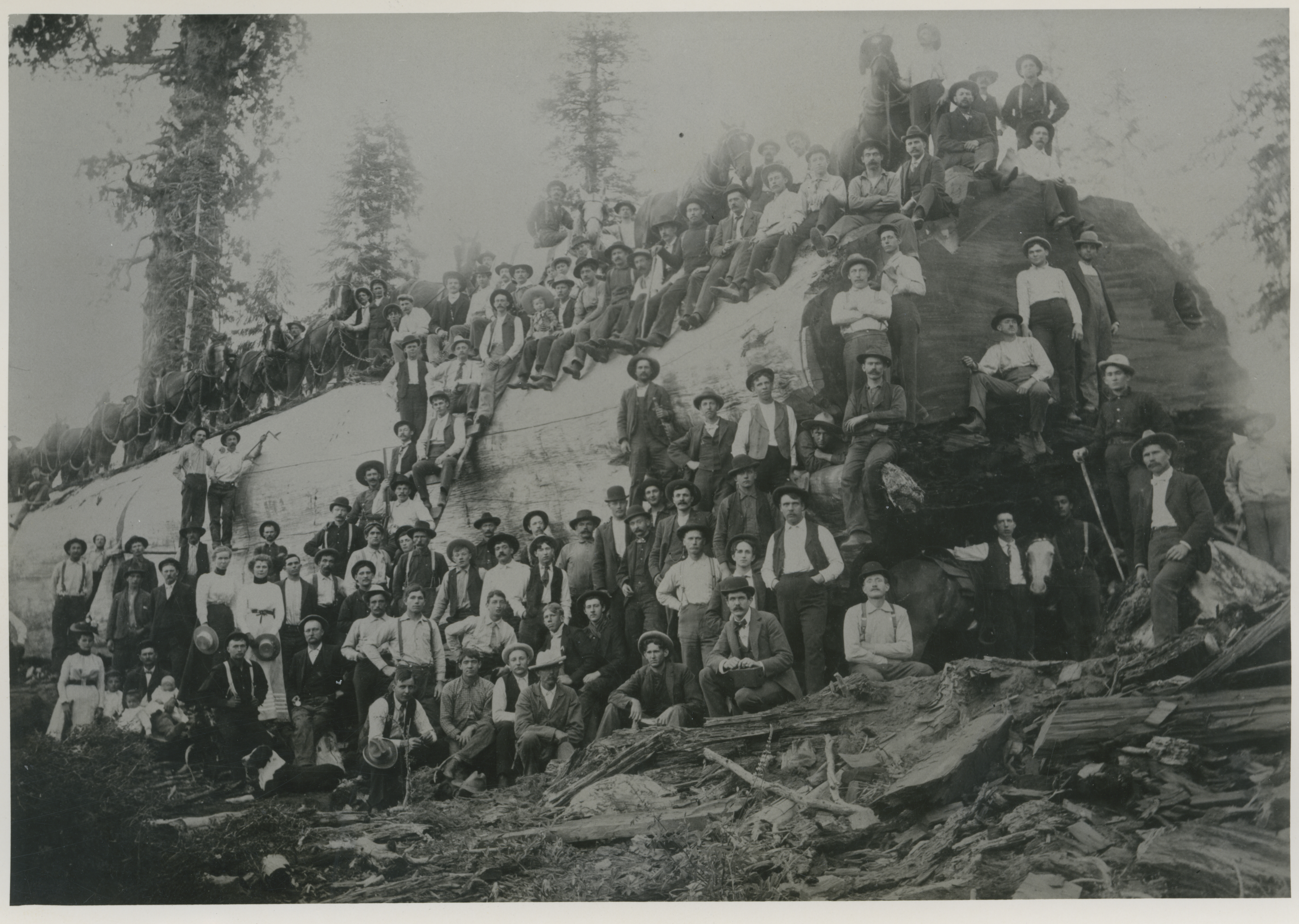
Loggers and a team of horses pose on a fallen giant sequoia measuring 26 feet (7.9 m) in diameter.

Converse Basin was once the world's second-largest giant sequoia grove before most of its mature giant sequoias were logged between 1892 and 1918. Large-scale logging began under the Sanger Lumber Company, which felled an estimated 8,000 giant sequoias in an episode described as "the greatest orgy of destructive lumbering in the history of the world." Only about 60 to 100 large giant sequoias survived the logging.

By November 1899, the Converse Basin mill had produced 19 million board feet of lumber that season. This was equivalent to approximately 2.6% of California's reported lumber production of 737 million board feet for the year.

=== Conservation and federal ownership ===
Concern over logging in the giant sequoia groves of the Sierra Nevada became part of California's emerging conservation movement in the late 19th century. Visalia newspaper publisher and editor George W. Stewart was a prominent advocate for preserving the groves and pointed to the extensive logging in Converse Basin as an example of what could happen to other giant sequoia forests. He campaigned for federal protection of the remaining groves, including the Giant Forest, which became part of Sequoia National Park when the park was established in 1890.

Converse Basin itself remained unprotected as logging continued. In 1902, John Muir wrote that preserving the Converse Basin groves was "vastly more important" than saving the individual Boole Tree and described the groves as being rapidly destroyed.

Converse Basin remained in private ownership until 1935, when the U.S. Forest Service purchased more than 20,000 acres that included the grove, Hume Lake, ten other giant sequoia groves, and surrounding lands.

Federal ownership did not immediately end commercial logging in Converse Basin. A 1990 agreement on the management of giant sequoia groves in Sequoia National Forest made an exception for part of the second-growth forest in Converse Basin. The Forest Service later excluded giant sequoia groves in California from commercial timber production and directed that they be managed for protection and restoration.

In 2000, Converse Basin became part of the newly established Giant Sequoia National Monument. The proclamation prohibited timber production within the monument and limited tree removal primarily to ecological restoration, maintenance, and public safety.

=== Environmental impact ===
The logging of Converse Basin caused extensive deforestation and the loss of most of its old-growth forest, including thousands of mature giant sequoias and associated conifers. In 1915, Henry Seidel Canby wrote evocatively of the destruction in Harper's Monthly.

It lay, a great bowl, open and near the sky, views down from its southern rim to the great plain, an edge of forest cresting it to the north. All within was a vast and lonely cemetery. A stream wound among broken trunks, torn roots, and whitened slabs of lumber, through the midst of the grassy valley. Above the thin turf rose weathered pines or clumps of feathery sequoia, like Italian cypresses, and beneath and beside them, at decorous intervals, were the great tombs of the dead sequoia.

They were only stumps, but in that melancholy landscape stumps like these had power over the imagination. The bark had long since gone from them, but the wood held firm and fast. Ten feet, fifteen feet, twenty feet, they rose above the ground, and two of us could lie head-to-head upon the tops as we pored over their thousand years of rings.

Twenty years had brought back beauty to this wasted valley, though beauty of a strange and melancholy sort. Flowers were everywhere, most of all where the little stream at intervals drew over its ripples a canopy of pink azalea, now in fullest bloom. But the forest had gone. An indiscriminate slaughter had let in the sun, its enemy; had dried the springs, which were its lifeblood; and such tearing and ripping as we had seen at Hume had rendered the soil, its mother, unfit except for barren grass. A few lonely redwoods, spared out of wantonness, had done their best to plant the spaces, but the younglings near them could only patch the ground; the pines and firs had well-nigh given up the struggle. Ranging cattle were more than a match for Nature and her seedling trees. In the great stumps themselves, in blocks and fragments scattered over the soil, in the logs which choked the streams, was more dead and wasted lumber than a forester could hope to grow on so many acres in a hundred years. The story of the Appalachians was being told again, and more loudly.

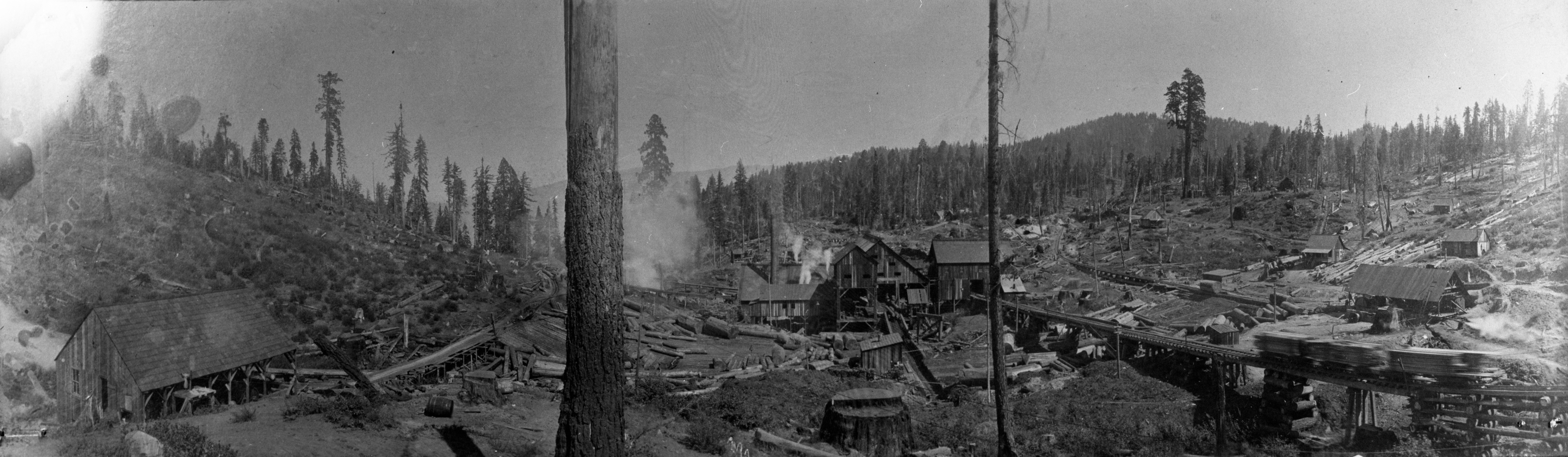
This panoramic photo of the Converse Basin Mill illustrates the clearcutting logging practices.

In the 1930s, Sequoia National Park commissioner Walter Fry and superintendent John R. White, “marveled that man had been able by crude methods to do so much damage.”

== Regeneration and restoration ==
Historic giant sequoia stumps and second-growth mixed-conifer forest in Converse Basin Grove, 2022.

Converse Basin is regenerating, but over-logging sharply truncated its age structure. A forest that once contained trees spanning thousands of years became dominated by younger growth. Fire exclusion altered the recovering forest, and repeated wildfires damaged younger stands. The return of old-growth structure will take centuries.

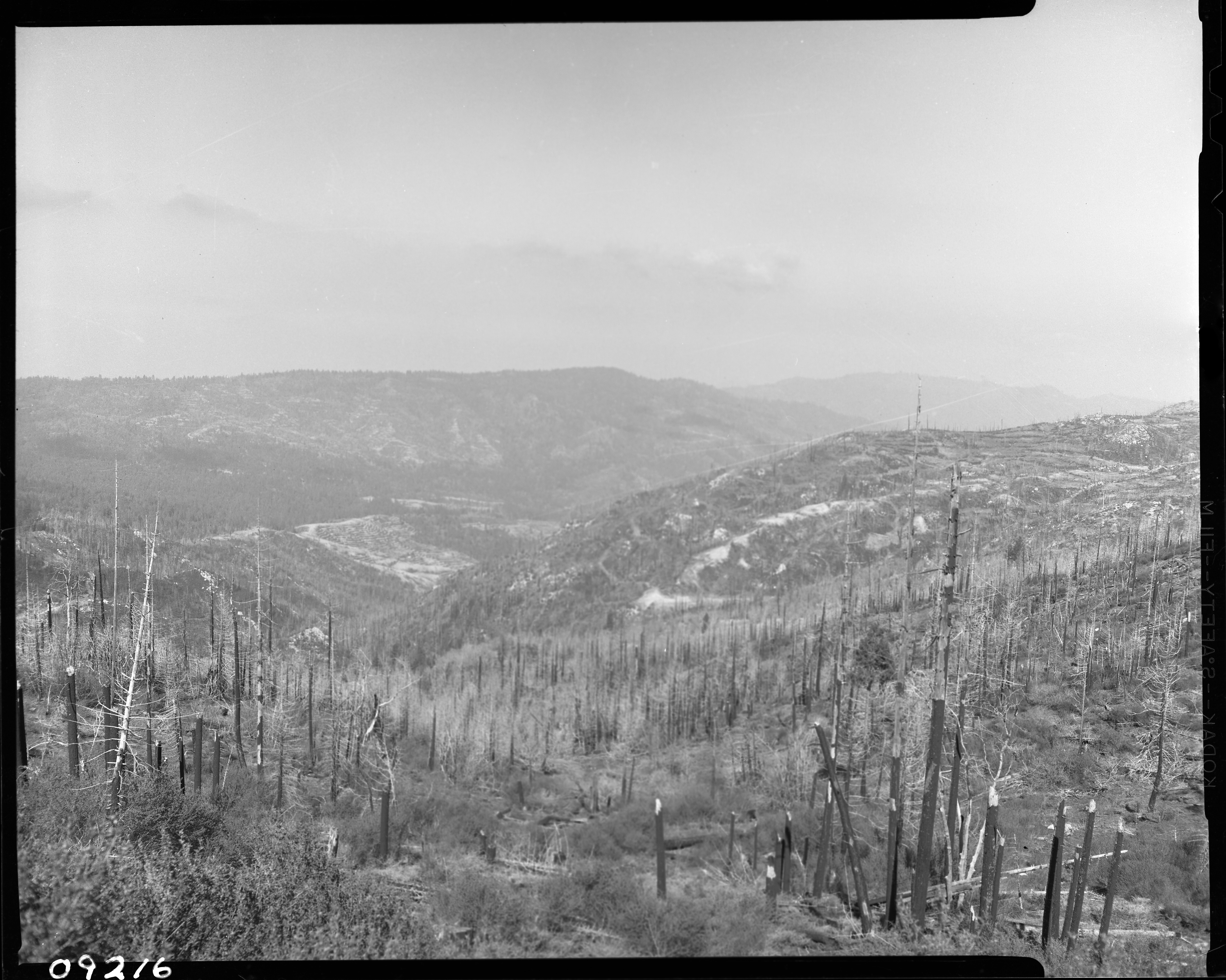
Converse Basin eight years after the 1955 McGee Fire, showing forest regrowth in 1963.

Major fires burned through Converse Basin in 1928 and 1955. The 1955 McGee Fire burned most of the grove and threatened the Boole Tree. In 2015, the Rough Fire burned through Converse Basin and damaged planted stands.

Standing dead conifers and piled woody debris in 2022.

After the McGee Fire, the Forest Service established plantations, mostly of ponderosa pine, in heavily burned areas. As the second-growth forest developed, surface and ladder fuels accumulated. Some planted stands were later damaged by drought, insects, and the Rough Fire. Subsequent management has focused on reducing fuels and restoring a more native mixture of tree species.

== Hiking and recreation ==
Converse Basin includes several hiking trails and recreation areas, including the Boole Tree Trail, Chicago Stump Trail, and Stump Meadow.

- The Boole Tree Trail is a 2.5-mile (4.0 km) loop leading to the Boole Tree. The route passes through forest containing white fir, oak, incense cedar, and young giant sequoias, with views toward the Kings River gorge and surrounding Sierra Nevada.
- The Chicago Stump Trail is a 0.5-mile (0.80 km) loop leading to the Chicago Stump, the remains of the General Noble Tree. The trail crosses an area containing young giant sequoias.
- Stump Meadow contains numerous giant sequoia stumps remaining from historic logging. Unlike other logged portions of the grove, the area has experienced comparatively limited sequoia regeneration and has been the subject of scientific study.

== Notable trees ==
Notable trees and remnants in the grove include:

- Boole Tree: Once considered a candidate for the world's largest tree, the Boole Tree is now ranked as the sixth-largest giant sequoia by volume, at 42,472 cubic feet (1,202.7 m^{3}). It has a circumference of more than 112 feet (34 m) at its base and stands 267 feet (81 m) tall. It is the largest giant sequoia on National Forest System lands.
- Chicago Stump: The remains of the General Noble Tree, which was felled for exhibition at the 1893 World's Columbian Exposition. General Noble was the second-largest tree in the grove before it was cut.
- Muir Snag: A standing remnant of a giant sequoia estimated to have been about 3,500 years old when it died. The snag has a base diameter of 35.9 feet (10.9 m) and stands about 140 feet (43 m) tall. It is named for John Muir, who described it as "the largest I measured" in a report prepared for botanist Charles S. Sargent.

== Gallery ==
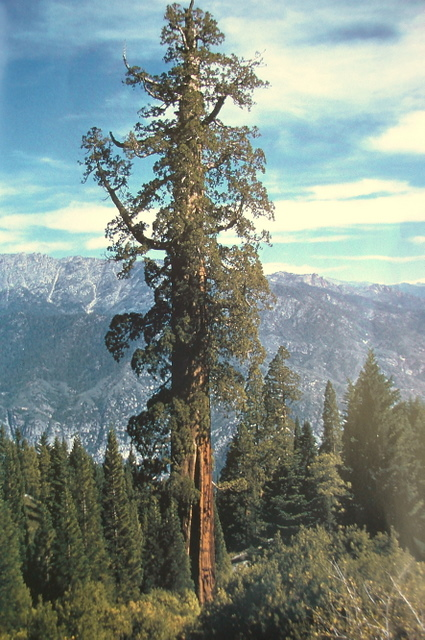
Boole, the 6th largest giant sequoia in the world.

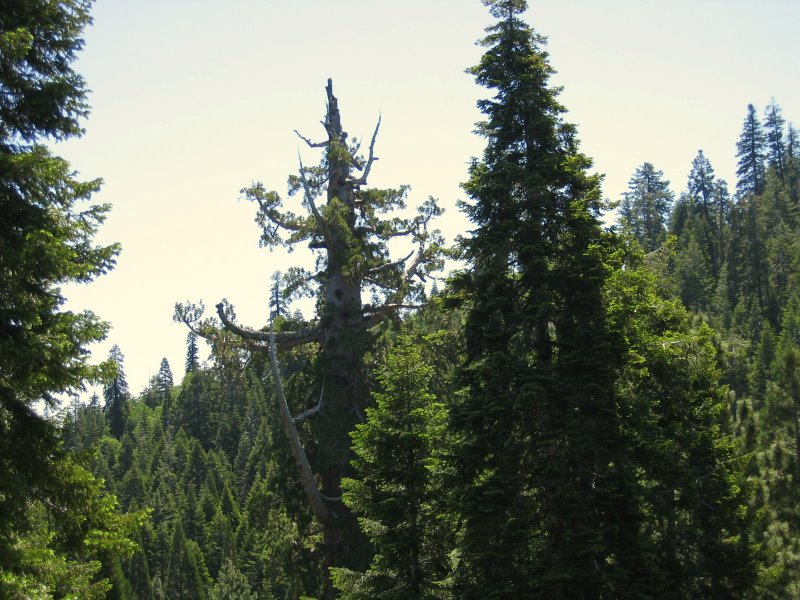
The dead canopy of Boole caused by shock immediately after almost all of the surrounding trees were cut down.

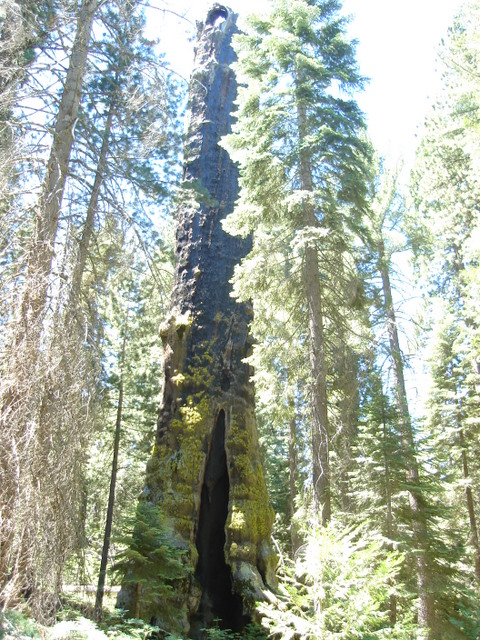
The Muir Snag

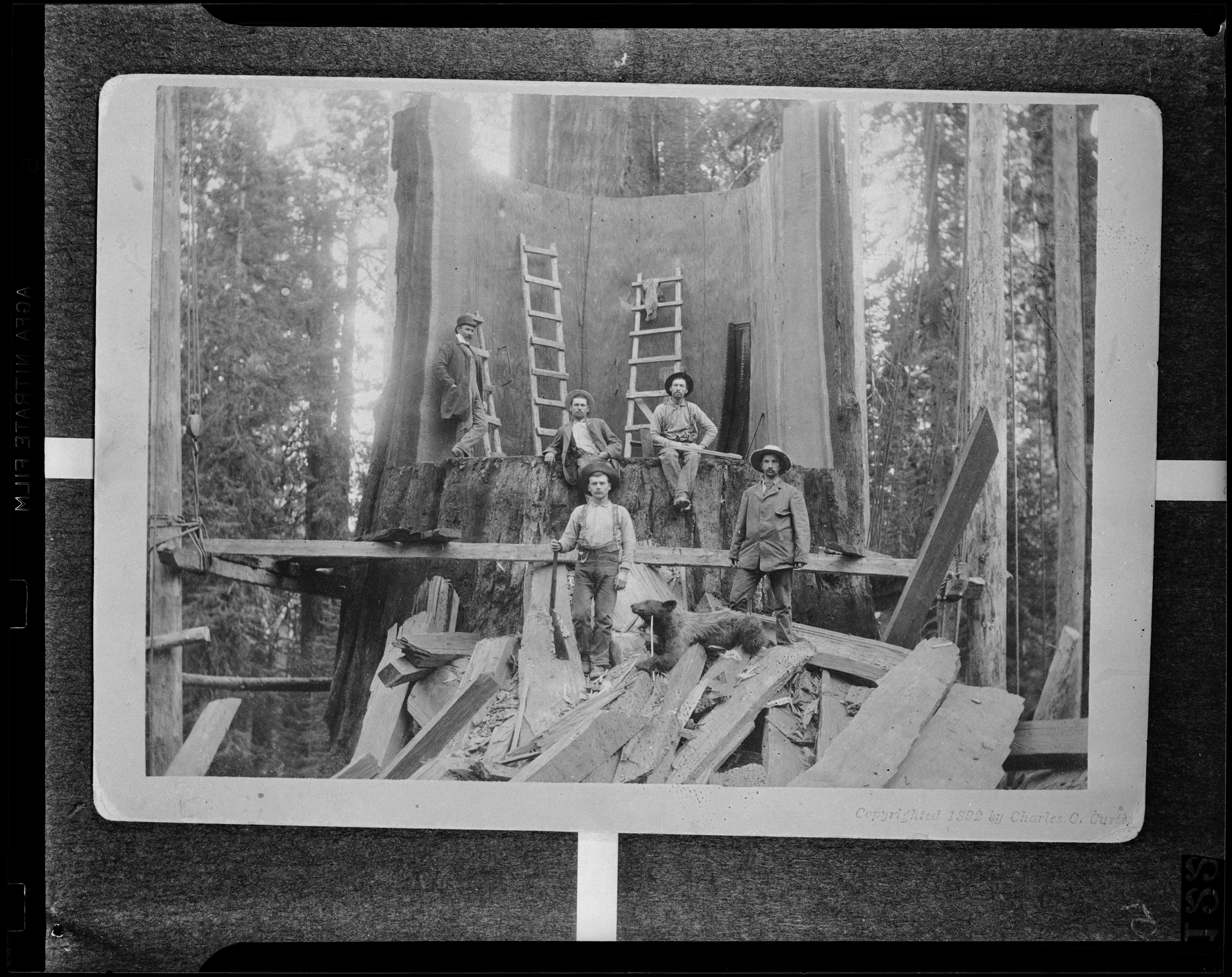
The General Noble Tree was cut, sectioned, and shipped to Chicago for the World Columbian Exposition.

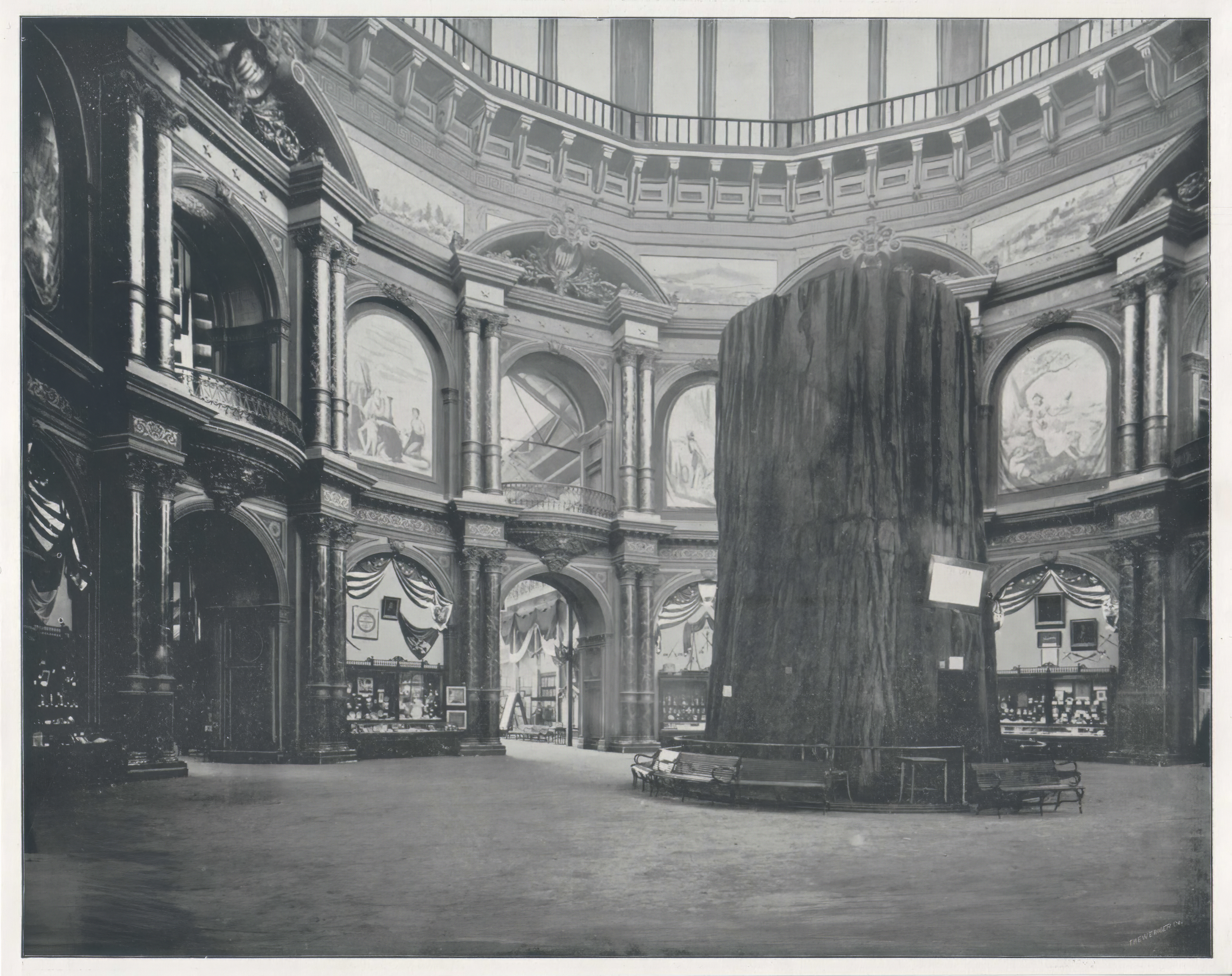
The General Noble on display in Chicago in 1893.

== See also ==
- List of giant sequoia groves
- Hume-Bennett Lumber Company
- Nelder Grove – a giant sequoia grove that was logged extensively in the 19th century.

== Bibliography ==
- Fry, Walter; White, John R. (1930). Big Trees. Palo Alto, California: Stanford University Press.
- Hartesveldt, Richard J.; Harvey, H. Thomas; Shellhammer, Howard S.; Ronald E., Stecker (1975). The Giant Sequoia of the Sierra Nevada (PDF). Washington, D.C.: U.S. Department of the Interior, National Park Service.
- Johnston, Hank (2003). They Felled the Redwoods (Thirteenth ed.). Stauffer Publishing. ISBN 0-87046-003-X.
- McGee, Lizzie. Mills of the Sequoias, Visalia, California, Tulare County Historical Society, Historical Bulletin, March 1952
