= Hume =

Hume most commonly refers to:

- David Hume (1711–1776), Scottish philosopher

Hume may also refer to:

== People ==
- Hume (surname)
- Hume (given name)
- James Hume Nisbet (1849–1923), Scottish-born novelist and artist

== In fiction ==
- Hume, the name of the human race in the Ivalice universe of the computer game series Final Fantasy
- Desmond Hume, a fictional character on the television series Lost
- Eleanor Hume, a character from the role-playing video game Tales of Berseria
- Nick Hume, the protagonist of the 2007 film Death Sentence
- Hobart Hume III, a fictional character on the television series Shining Time Station

== Places ==
=== Australia ===
- Hume, Australian Capital Territory, a suburb of Canberra
- City of Hume, a municipality in northern Melbourne
- Hume County, a cadastral division of New South Wales
- Division of Hume, an electoral district in the Australian House of Representatives, in New South Wales
- Hume (region), a region in northeastern Victoria
- Hume Highway, the main road between Melbourne and Sydney
- Lake Hume, a large artificial lake and the associated Hume Dam

=== Scotland ===
- Hume Castle, the historic 13th-century eponymous fortress of the Hume/Home family in Berwickshire
- Hume, Scottish Borders, a village

=== Singapore ===
- Hume MRT station, an underground Mass Rapid Transit station

=== United States ===
- Hume, Fresno County, California, an unincorporated community
- Hume Lake, in Fresno County, California
- Hume, Illinois, a village
- Hume, Missouri, a city
- Hume, New York, a town
- Hume, Ohio, an unincorporated community
- Hume, Virginia, an unincorporated community
- Hume Township, Whiteside County, Illinois
- Hume Township, Michigan

=== Moon ===
- Hume (crater)

== Other uses ==
- Hume (soil), a type of soil
- Hume (programming language) (Higher-order Unified Meta-Environment), a computer programming language
- Hume Bank, an Australian banking co-op
- Lord Hume of Berwick, a title which was created twice, in the Peerages of England and Great Britain
- Hume baronets, two titles, one in the Baronetage of Nova Scotia and the other in the Baronetage of Great Britain
- Hume Formation, a geologic formation in the Northwest Territories, Canada
- Hume Lake Christian Camps, a nonprofit parachurch operator of Christian camps and conference centers
- Hume Street, Dublin, Ireland
- Hume School, Arlington County, Virginia, United States, on the National Register of Historic Places

== See also ==
- Hulme (disambiguation)
