= Hulme (disambiguation) =

Hulme is an inner city area and electoral ward of Manchester, England

Hulme may also refer to:

== Places ==
- Hulme, Cheshire, a U.K. location
- Hulme, Staffordshire, England
- Hulme, Trafford, a U.K. location
- Cheadle Hulme, Stockport, Greater Manchester
- Hulme End, Staffordshire

== Other uses ==
- Hulme (surname), a family name (including a list of persons with the name)
- James Hulme Canfield (1847–1909), fourth President of the Ohio State University
- William Hulme Hooper (19th century), Royal Navy officer
- Daniel J. Hulme (1980-present), AI expert, speaker and business commentator
- Hulme Supercars Ltd., a New Zealand sports car manufacturer

== See also ==
- Hulme Hall (disambiguation)
- Hume (disambiguation)
- Levenshulme, Greater Manchester
