= Hume Lake (disambiguation) =

Hume Lake is a reservoir in central California.

Hume Lake may also refer to:

- Hume Lake Christian Camps, a nonprofit parachurch operator of Christian camps and Conference center|conference centers
- Hume Lake, a subdivision of Hume, Fresno County, California, an unincorporated community in Fresno County, California
