= Hume Station =

Hume Station may refer to:

- Hume Station in Fresno County, California, United States
- Hume MRT station, in Bukit Timah, Singapore
