= Kronospan =

Austrian-founded wood manufacturing company

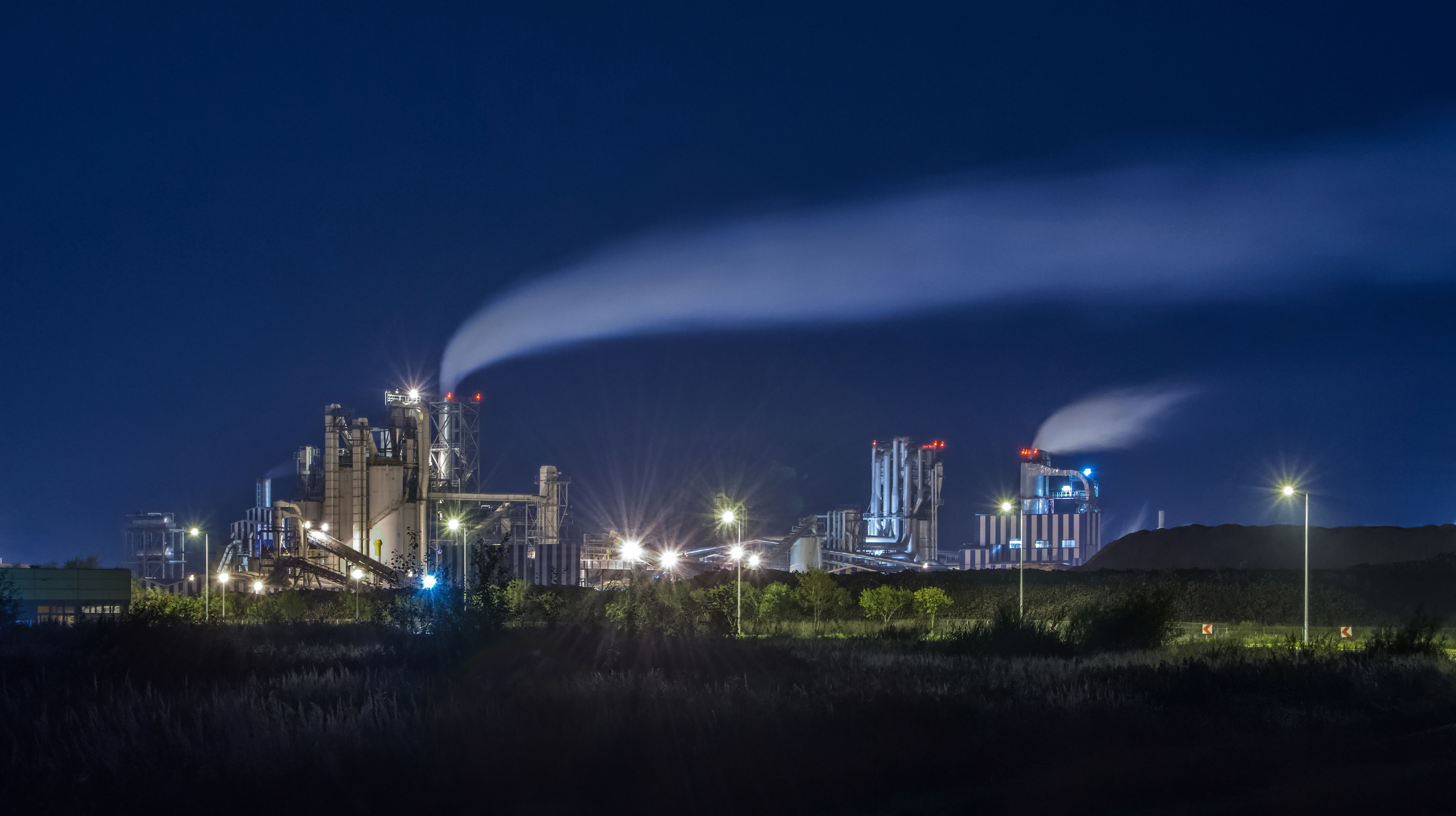
- Type: Private
- Industry: Wood, manufacturing, retail, wholesale
- Founded: 1897
- Headquarters: Austria
- Products: Processed wood
- Revenue: €4 billion (2015)
- Number of employees: over 15,000 (2021)
- Website: www.kronospan.com

Kronospan is an Austrian-founded, international company that manufactures and distributes wood-based panels which are used in applications including flooring, furniture and timber-framed houses.

The company manufactures particleboard, medium-density fibreboard, laminate flooring, resins for wood-based panels and oriented strand board. It also produces melamine-faced panels, post-formed worktops, wall panels, lacquered HDF and others and speciality and decorative paper.

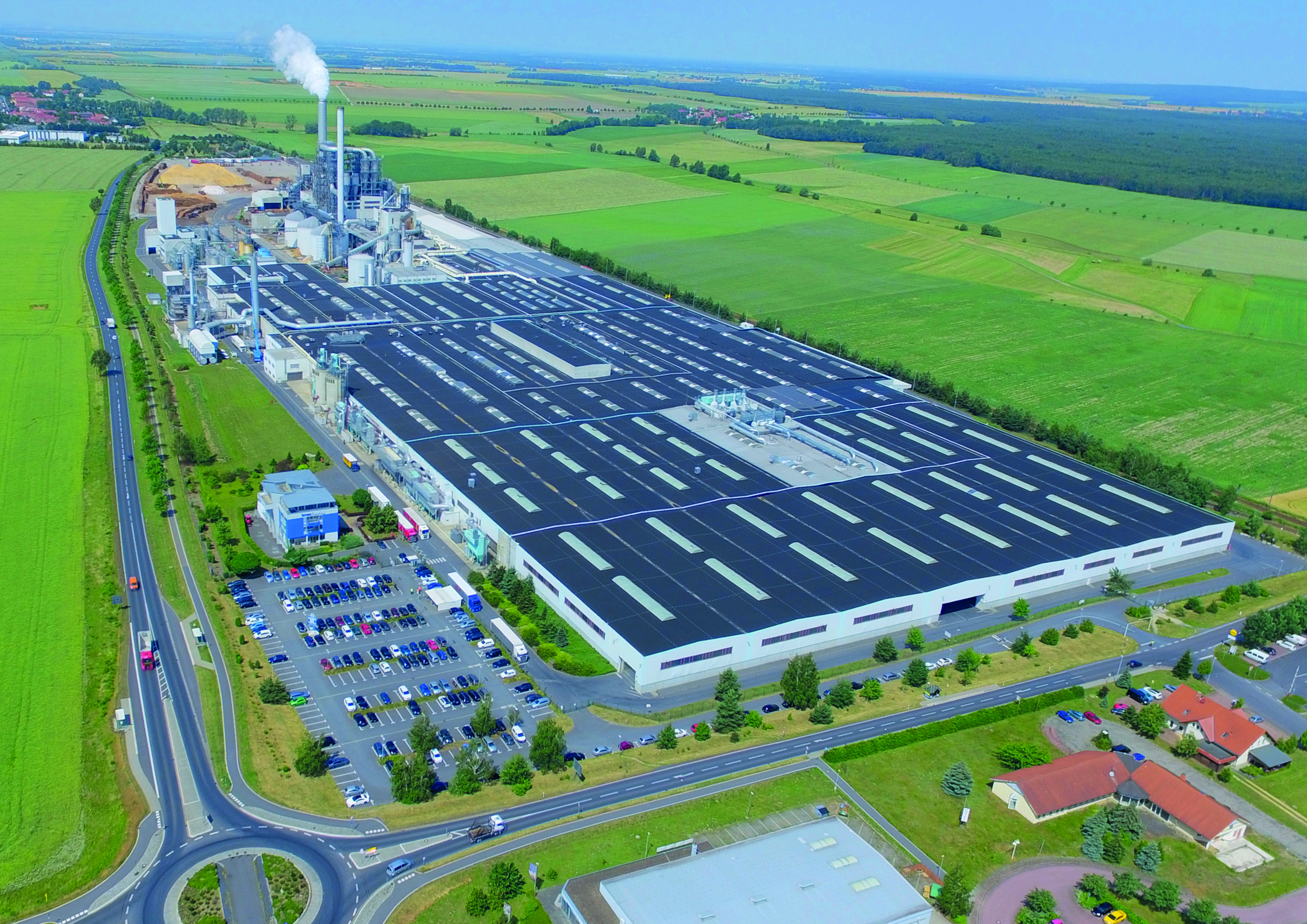
Lampertswalde Germany

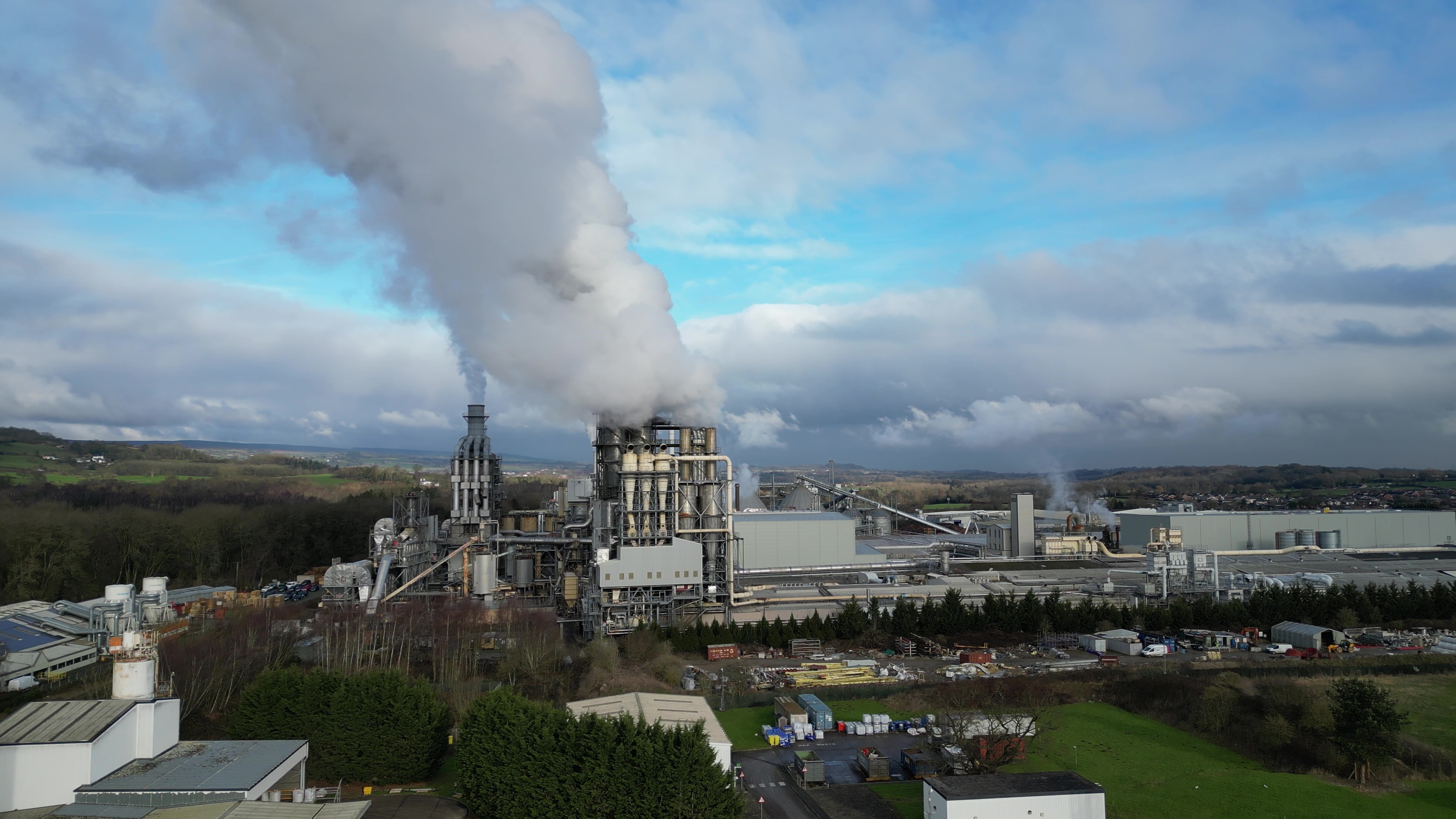
Kronospan factory in Chirk

== History ==
Findings in 2019 by Austria's federal administrative court show that Kronospan consists of multiple companies, which were centered around the Kronospan Technical Holdings Limited, based in Cyprus. The Cypriot firm, which has been renamed since, belongs to a company on the Isle of Man, which again is owned by a foundation in Liechtenstein.

A subsidiary of the company, Kronospan Forestry Ltd., manages over 1000 hectares of sustainable forests in the south-west of Scotland. This includes both young forests as well as mid-age plantations offering greater wildlife diversity. In 1999 the company joined the Forest Stewardship Council scheme, which ensures that sustainable practices are used. Kronospan works with Business in the Community Wales (BICW) which aims to address key social issues in the most deprived rural and urban areas of Wales. In 2003 Kronospan was one of the first organisations to sign up with the Carbon Trust in Wales for a pilot programme to manage carbon emissions.

In 2010, Kronospan's workforce took part in a symbolic two-hour shutdown in protest against Government subsidies paid to the biomass industry, which they say directly threaten their jobs, future wood manufacturing and associated industries. Kronospan's shutdown supported the European Panel Federation's Day of Action and the company has joined Green campaigners and the UK's Wood Panel Industries Federation in lobbying Government through the Make Wood Work campaign to reverse the consequences of the Renewables Obligation, which is a result of European Union Climate Change Directives.

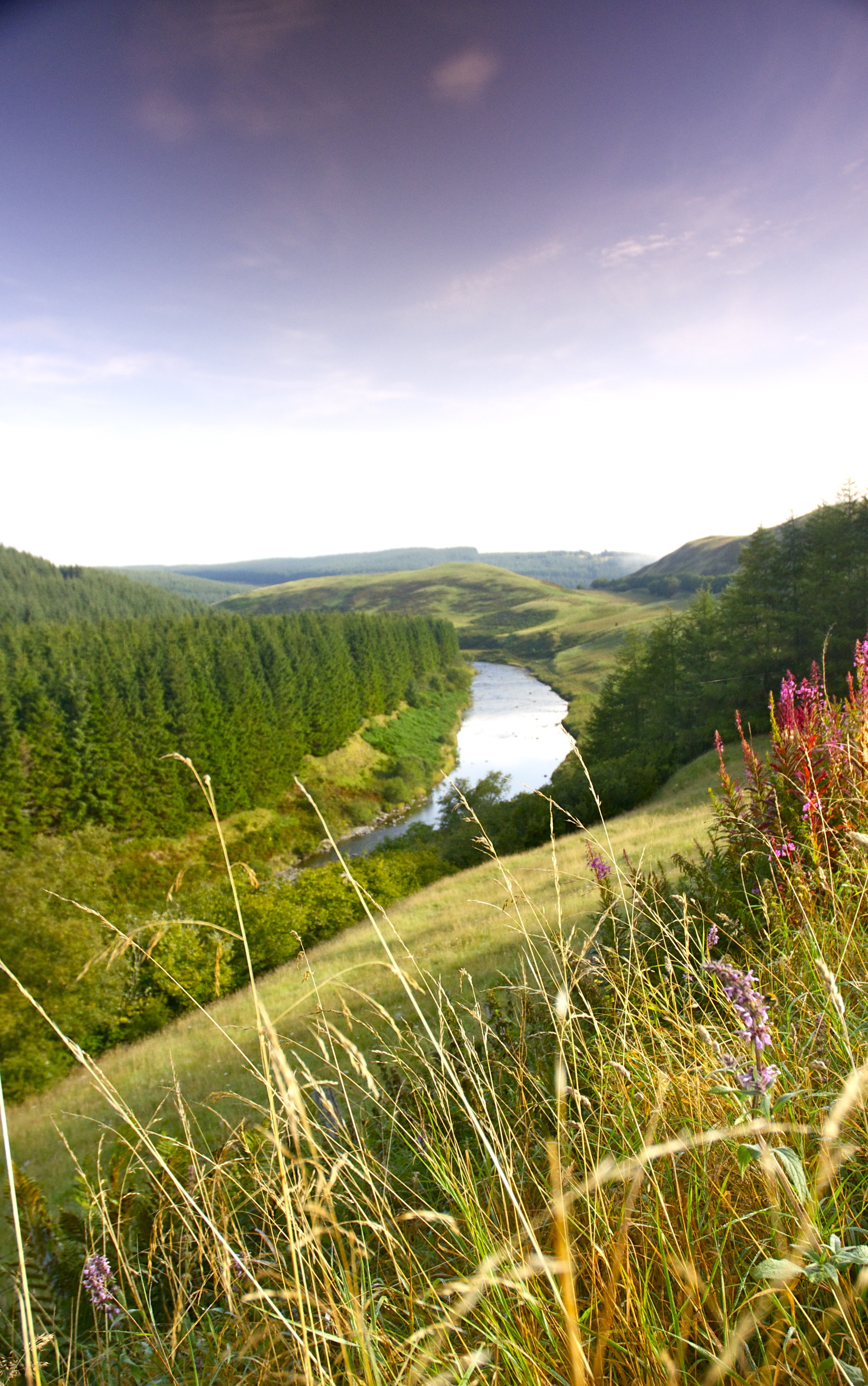
Kronospan's 11,000 ha forest in Scotland

=== Pollution ===
According to environmental NGO Arnika, Kronospan's production site in the town of Jihlava, Czech Republic, is the No. 2 source of environmental pollution in the country overall, topping the list of released formaldehyde (2018 increase of 3 tons vs. previous year) and just 2nd to Spolana Neratovice in the released amount of mutagenis substances.

In 2019 complaints were filed with the administration of Russian city of Elektrogorsk as environmental scientists found the Kronospan factory was releasing polluted waste water with extreme levels of formaldehyde into a local river and also polluting the air by letting unfiltered production air full of sawdust into the air causing allergies, asthma and respiratory problems in children and adults. On 19 November 2019 the Russian TV show “Moment of truth” released a YouTube documentary (ru. “Кроношпан уходи”, eng. “Kronospan go away”) with English subtitles on the situation and the environmental catastrophe as well as the suspected corruption going on at the Kronospan plant in Ekektrogorsk.

In January 2002 Kronospan UK was fined £60,000 for discharging effluent into the River Bradley (a small stream, more usually known as Afon Bradley, that flows northwards for about 2 miles from near Chirk and discharges into the river Dee). The company admitted six offences between 29 March–9 October 2001, with a further four offences taken into consideration. In May 2005 Kronospan UK was fined £25,000 by Wrexham magistrates after pleading guilty to five offences of polluting local waterways.

In July 2005 Kronospan UK invested £700,000 on an improved water recycling and filtration process.

In March 2002, the company was fined £20,500 after 8,000 tonnes of waste timber caught fire at the Chirk plant (on the England/Wales border) and burned for several days. The fire was believed to have been caused by spontaneous combustion following a buildup of heat in damp conditions. The plant caught fire again on 17 June 2002 and firefighters were drafted in from stations in North Wales, Cheshire and Shropshire to tackle the oil fire which had started in a boiler room. The plant suffered further industrial fires in April and September 2007 and September 2010. In 2012 firefighters attended industrial blazes at the plant in June, twice in July and again in October. On 17 April 2014 fire broke out again at the factory, requiring 5 appliances and an aerial platform ladder. The fire was extinguished 11 hours later.

=== Kronospan in Luxembourg ===
In Sanem, Luxembourg, Kronospan has continued to expand its operations through major investments in production capacity and sustainability initiatives. In June 2024, the company commissioned a new particleboard line supplied by Siempelkamp, designed to run entirely on recycled waste wood, with a capacity of nearly 1 million m³ annually.EUWID Wood Products and Panels – Issue 27/2024. This line is supported by the construction of a high-bay warehouse and three new short-cycle presses from Wemhöner, enabling the site to supply a full portfolio of wood-based products from a single location.EUWID Wood Products and Panels – Issue 40/2023. Parallel to this expansion, Kronospan Energy completed significant renewable energy projects, including a third biomass combined heat and power plant (CHP 3) with a 35 MW electrical output and photovoltaic systems totaling about 15 MWp, allowing the site to generate more power than it consumes. These measures are part of the company's broader strategy to reduce its carbon footprint; Sanem has already been classified as CO₂-negative, supported by separate sustainability reporting and environmental product declarations for key product groups. Overall, the total investment in Sanem has exceeded €1.2 billion since the 1990s, making it one of Kronospan’s most important European hubs.
