= Hulme (surname) =

Hulme is a surname. Notable people with the surname include:

- Alan Hulme (1907–1989), Australian politician
- Alfred Hulme (1911–1982), New Zealand recipient of the Victoria Cross
- Arthur Hulme (1877–1916), English footballer
- Darren Hulme (born 1977), Australian rules footballer
- David Hulme (rugby league) (born 1964), British rugby league footballer
- David Russell Hulme (born 1951), Welsh conductor and musicologist
- Denny Hulme (1936–1992), New Zealand car racer, F1 world champion
- Edward Hulme (1812–1876), surgeon and hospital administrator in New Zealand
- Etta Hulme (1923–2014), American editorial cartoonist
- F. Edward Hulme (1841–1909), English artist and botanist
- Fred Hulme, English rugby league footballer of the 1950s
- Joe Hulme (1904–1991), English footballer and cricketer
- John Hulme (Derbyshire cricketer) (1862–1940), English cricketer
- John Hulme (Shropshire cricketer) (born 1950), Welsh cricketer
- John Hulme (author) (born 1969), American children's writer and film director
- Anne Perry (1938–2023, as Juliet Hulme), English author of historical detective fiction
- Kathryn Hulme (1900–1981), American novelist
- Keri Hulme (1947–2021), New Zealand writer
- Lachy Hulme (born 1971), Australian film actor
- T. E. Hulme (1883–1917), English writer
- W. Wilson Hulme II (1946–2007), American Curator of the National Postal Museum
- William Hulme (circa 1631–1691), English lawyer
- William Hulme (British Army officer) (died 1855), Manchester Regiment officer
