= Chirk =

Town in Wales

Chirk: Welsh: Y Waun
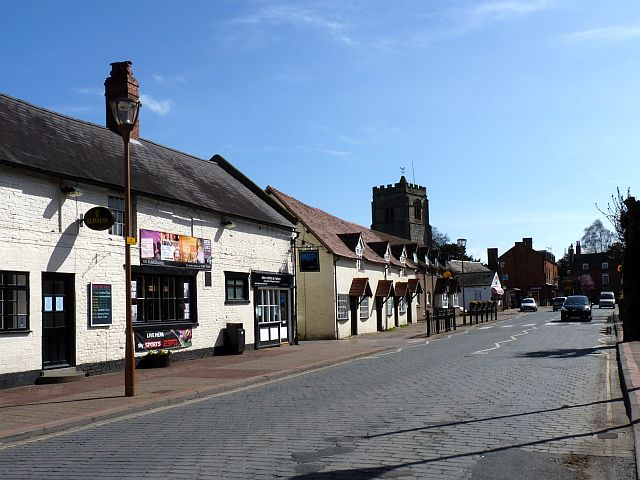
- Church Street, Chirk

- Location within Wrexham
- Population: 4,468 (2011)
- OS grid reference: SJ295375
- Community: Chirk
- Principal area: Wrexham
- Preserved county: Clwyd
- Country: Wales
- Sovereign state: United Kingdom
- Post town: WREXHAM
- Postcode district: LL14
- Dialling code: 01691
- Police: North Wales
- Fire: North Wales
- Ambulance: Welsh
- UK Parliament: Montgomeryshire and Glyndŵr
- Senedd Cymru – Welsh Parliament: Clwyd South
- List of places UK Wales Wrexham 52.930°N 3.050°W Map of the community

Chirk (Welsh: Y Waun) is a town and community in Wrexham County Borough, Wales, 10 miles (16 kilometres) south of Wrexham, between it and Oswestry. At the 2011 census, it had a population of 4,468. Historically in the traditional county of Denbighshire, and later Clwyd, it has been part of Wrexham County Borough since a local government reorganisation in 1996. The border with the English county of Shropshire is immediately south of the town, on the other side of the River Ceiriog.

The town is served by Chirk railway station and the A5/A483 roads.

== Etymology ==
The name of the town in English, Chirk, derives from the name of the River Ceiriog, which itself may mean "the favoured one". The Welsh place name, Y Waun, is literally "The Moor".

== History and heritage ==
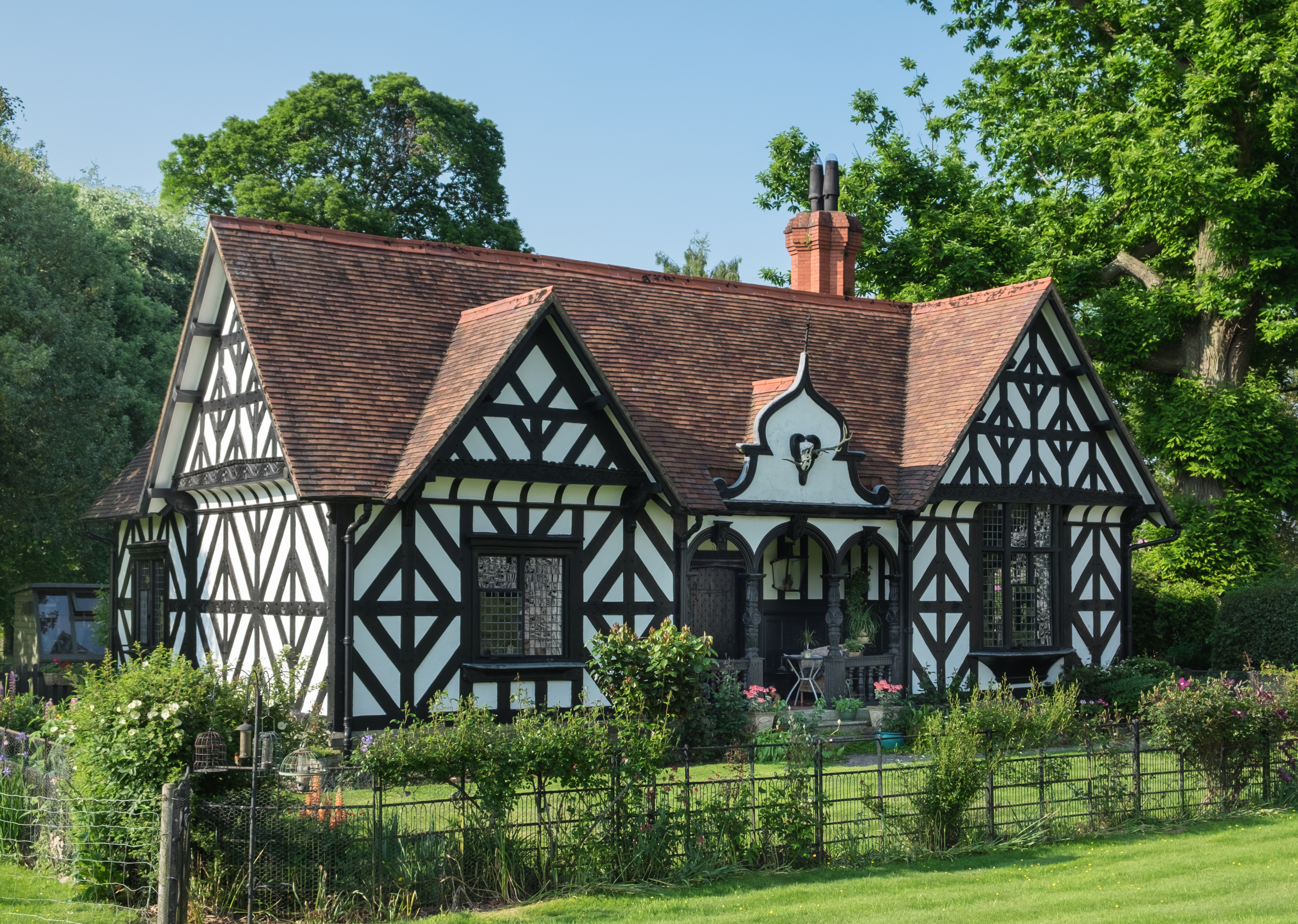
Llwyn-y-cil Lodge, just inside the gates of Chirk Castle and a grade II listed building

Chirk Castle, a National Trust property, is a medieval castle. Two families are associated with the town and its castle: the Trevor family of Brynkinallt and the Myddelton family. The Hughes of Gwerclas, a family descended from the ancient kings of Powys Fadog, also lived in the area for many years.

Other aspects of the town include a section of Offa's Dyke and the Chirk Aqueduct, part of a larger World Heritage Site including Pontcysyllte aqueduct, on the Llangollen Canal, built in 1801 by Thomas Telford. The Glyn Valley Tramway terminated on the canal near the mainline railway station.

The parish church of St Mary's is a Grade I listed building. The church building was begun during the 11th century by the Normans, although it is believed that an older llan, dedicated to St Tysilio, had pre-existed on the site. The existing church was dedicated to St Tysilio until the late 15th or early 16th century, after which it was re-dedicated to St Mary. Today, the church is a member of the Open Church Network and participates in the Sacred Space Project.

Chirk was formerly a coal mining community from the 17th to the 20th century. The two largest collieries were Black Park (one of the oldest in the north of Wales) and Brynkinallt (Welsh: Bryncunallt). These coal mines have now closed.

Chirk was a coaching stop on the old mail coach route along the A5 from London to Holyhead.

The Chester to Ruabon railway had been extended south to Shrewsbury by 1848, with stations at Llangollen Road (Whitehurst Halt, near Pentre) and Chirk; the Castle owners insisted that the railway not be visible to them and that the station be well outside the town lest it should encourage the populace to travel. South of the town a railway viaduct was constructed by Henry Robertson to take the line over the Ceiriog Valley.

The Llangollen branch of the Shropshire Union Canal runs through Chirk. The canal crosses the Ceiriog Valley (from England into Wales) along Thomas Telford's aqueduct. The aqueduct runs alongside the railway viaduct before the canal enters the Chirk Tunnel.

== Modern day ==
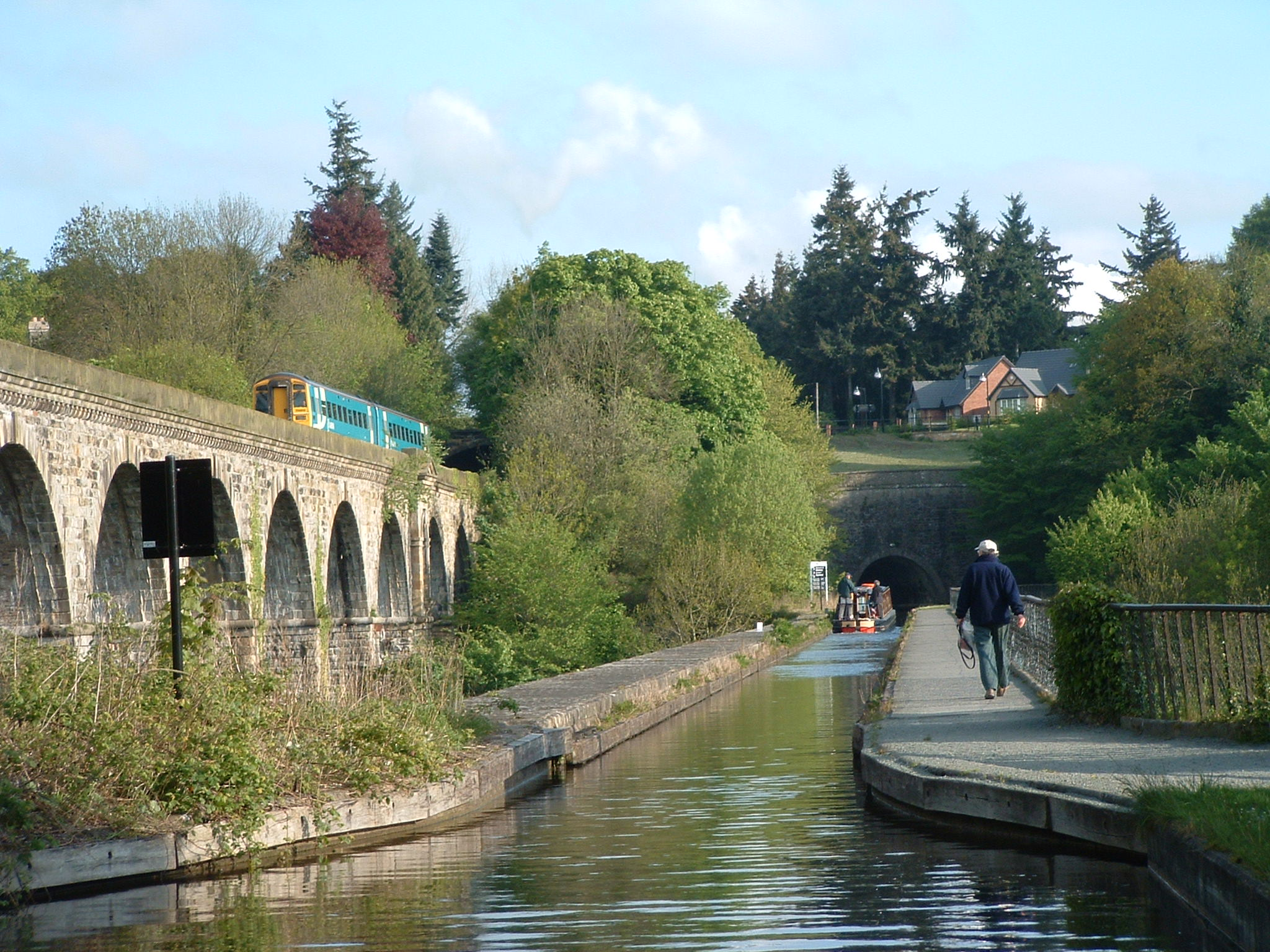
Looking towards Chirk over the Aqueduct and Viaduct

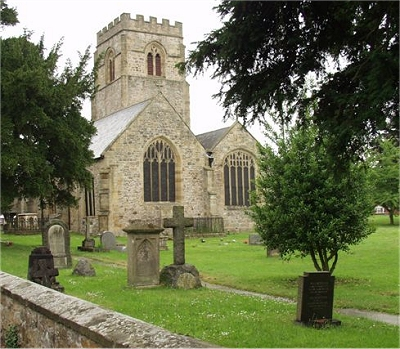
St Mary's Parish Church

Agriculture continues to be of some importance, as does tourism. The National Trust's Chirk Castle has prominence, as does the World Heritage Site of the Llangollen Canal, and the local scenery of the Ceiriog Valley and Berwyn Mountains. Manufacturing now plays a prominent position within the local industries, with major international firms such as Kronospan and Mondelez UK maintaining sites in the town.

The town has four churches: St Mary's (Church in Wales), Chirk Methodist Church, Sacred Heart (Roman Catholic) and the Community Church.

Chirk is served by two local primary schools: Ysgol Y Waun and Pentre Church in Wales Controlled School. Ysgol Y Waun is the main primary school. It was formed in 2012, by the merger of Chirk Infants and Ceiriog Junior. Ysgol Y Waun is a nursery, infant and junior school of mixed gender and lessons are taught through the medium of English. The school has about 335 pupils, with an increasing number of pupils on free school meals: 19.7% in 2014, which is above the Local Authority average but below the Wales average.

Pentre School is a nursery, infant and junior school of mixed gender. There are approximately 86 pupils on roll who are all taught through the medium of English. Welsh is taught as a compulsory part of the school curriculum as a second language. The school is in a relatively affluent area, with only 15.9% of the school population eligible for free school meals, which is substantially below the Local Authority and Wales averages.

Most pupils in the community attend Ysgol Dinas Brân, Llangollen, for their secondary education. Ysgol Dinas Brân is a relatively large, bilingual secondary school catering for pupils from ages 11 – 19 (including Sixth Form). Other secondary schools in the area include Ysgol Rhiwabon, St Martin's School (Shropshire) and St Joseph's in Wrexham. The area is served by independent schools, such as Moreton Hall and Ellesmere College in neighbouring Shropshire.

Although Chirk is a predominantly English-speaking area, some parents choose to educate their children through the medium of Welsh. The nearest Welsh-medium primary schools are in Glyn Ceiriog and Cefn Mawr. Pupils can then transfer to either Ysgol Dinas Brân, Llangollen or Ysgol Morgan Llwyd, Wrexham for Welsh-medium secondary education.

The Ceiriog Memorial Institute, in the Ceiriog valley, just west of Chirk, is home to a collection of Welsh cultural memorabilia and was founded in the early 1900s to support the Welsh language, culture and heritage for future generations.

In the 2011 census, a total of 3,652 residents (81.7%) have no skills in the Welsh language.

== Economy ==
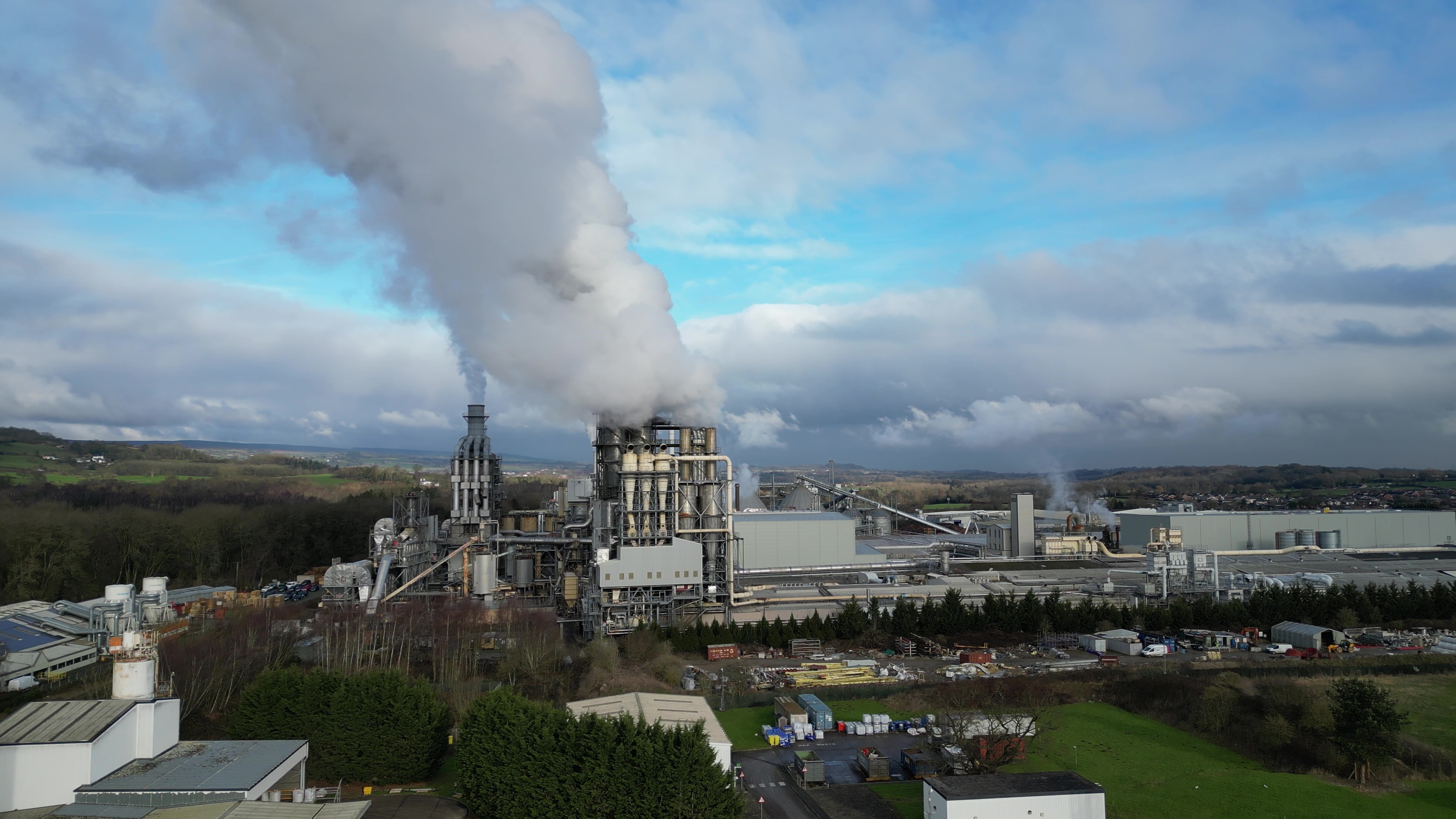
Kronospan factory in Chirk

A factory was opened by Cadbury in January 1969, which made Cadbury drinking chocolate and Bournvita, which cost £4m. It makes drinking chocolate and chocolate crumb. Another major industry in Chirk is a wood panel plant owned by Kronospan.

== Sport ==
Chirk was a prominent location in the development of association football in Wales during the late 19th century. The town is home to Chirk AAA F.C., a football team founded in 1876, playing in the Cymru North (the second tier of Welsh football). Chirk AAA FC have a plaque in honour of Billy Meredith (born in the town, and the club where he started his career in 1890); he returned briefly in 1894 before signing for Manchester City. A second plaque to Meredith is situated in Chirk's Millennium Gardens at the Station Avenue entrance to the park and cricket club. It was unveiled on 26 July 2002 by Meredith's daughter Winifrede.

Chirk Golf Club was founded in 1991 and closed in September 2012.

== Media ==
The town receives better television signals from the Wrekin TV transmitter which broadcasts BBC West Midlands and ITV Central. BBC Cymru Wales and ITV Cymru Wales are also received from the local relay station at the Moel-y-Parc transmitter situated near Cefn Mawr.

Radio stations that broadcast to the town are:

- BBC Radio Wales on 91.1 FM
- BBC Radio Cymru on 104.3 FM
- Heart North and Mid Wales on 88.0 FM
- Capital North West & Wales on 103.4 FM
- Calon FM, a community based station which broadcast from Wrexham on 105 FM.

The town is served by the local newspaper, The Border Counties Advertizer.

== Notable people ==
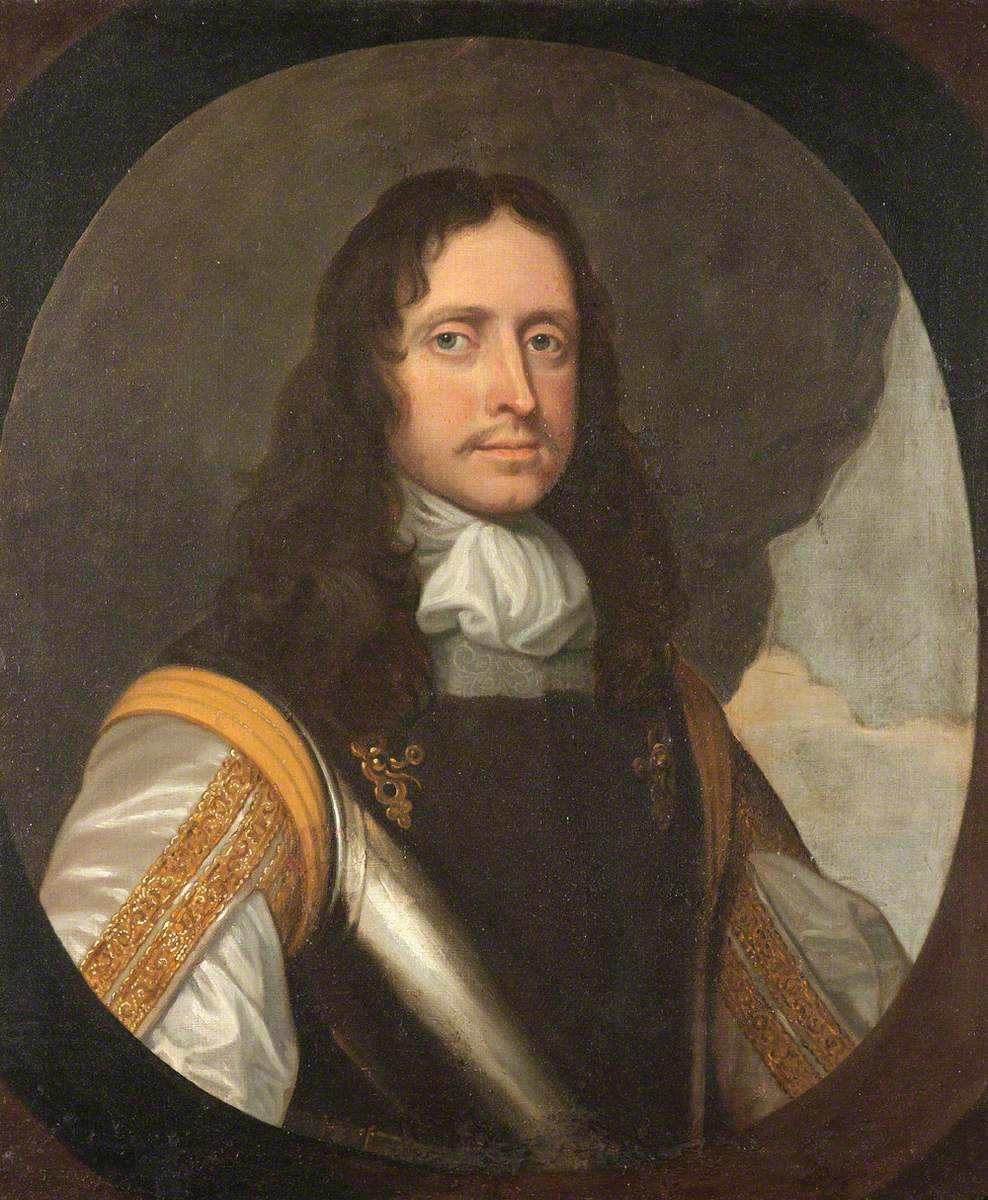
Sir Thomas Myddelton, 1st Baronet, painting 1670

- Sir Edward Trevor (ca.1580–1642), founder of the fortunes of the Trevor dynasty
- Sir Thomas Myddelton, 1st Baronet (1624–1663), MP for Flint Boroughs
- Sir Thomas Myddelton, 2nd Baronet (ca.1651–1684), MP for Denbighshire
- Sir Richard Myddelton, 3rd Baronet (1655–1716), of Chirk Castle, MP for Denbighshire
- Robert Roberts (1680–1741), cleric and writer.
- Frederick West (1767–1852), MP for Denbigh Boroughs
- Robert Myddelton Biddulph (1805–1872), MP for Denbigh Boroughs
- Joseph Fletcher (1813–1852), barrister and statistician
- Edwin Hill-Trevor, 1st Baron Trevor (1819–1894), MP for County Down (estate at Brynkinalt)
- R. S. Thomas (1913–2000), a Welsh poet and Anglican priest
- Ian Hamilton (born 1946), a Canadian mystery writer, former journalist and civil servant
- Peter Edwards, (born 1955), painter, he won the 1994 BP Portrait Award.

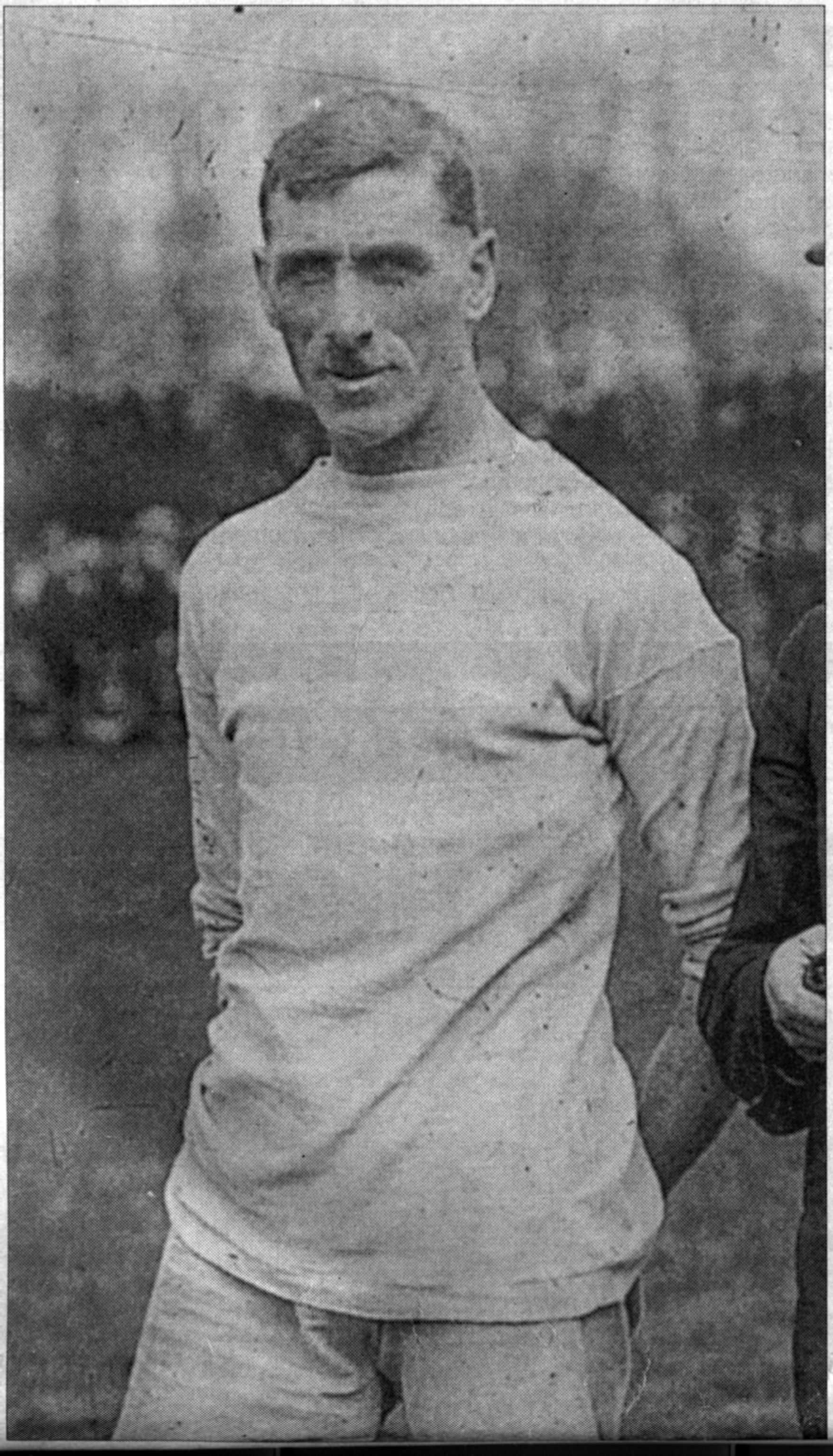
Billy Meredith, 1903

=== Sport ===
- Di Jones (1867–1902), footballer with 342 club appearances and 14 caps for Wales
- Hugh Morris (1872–1897), footballer with 59 club appearances and 3 caps for Wales
- Sam Meredith (1872–1921), footballer with 50 club appearances and 8 caps for Wales
- Billy Meredith (1874–1958), footballer with 680 club appearances and 48 caps for Wales
- Lot Jones (1882–1941), footballer with over 300 club appearances and 20 caps for Wales
- Harry Millership (1889-1959), footballer with 124 club appearances and 6 caps for Wales
- Stan Davies (1898–1972), footballer with over 220 club appearances and 18 caps for Wales
- John Hulme (born 1950), cricketer, left-handed batsman
- Paul Jones (born 1967), footballer with 583 club appearances and 50 caps for Wales
- Neil Thomas (born 1968), retired World Champion artistic gymnast
- Mike Jones (born 1987), footballer with over 450 club appearances

== See also ==
- Chirk Bank
