= Robert Roberts (priest) =

Welsh Anglican cleric and writer

Robert Roberts (1680–1741) was a Welsh Anglican cleric and writer. He was vicar of the parish of Chirk in north-east Wales for over thirty years, and during his time there he wrote a bi-lingual explanation of the Creed, Ten Commandments and the Lord's Prayer for the use of the inhabitants of Chirk and the surrounding area, where both English and Welsh were spoken.

== Life ==
Roberts was the son of Henry Roberts, who is described in the records of the University of Oxford relating to Robert Roberts as being a "gentleman" and as being from Llandysilio, near Llangollen in Denbighshire, Wales. Robert Roberts was educated at Jesus College, Oxford. He matriculated at the University of Oxford in March 1699, when he was recorded as being eighteen years old, and he graduated with a Bachelor of Arts degree in 1702. Roberts was then ordained as a priest in the Church of England and, in 1709, was appointed as vicar of the parish of Chirk, Denbighshire. He remained there until his death in 1741, his tombstone recording that he was then 61 years old.

Roberts wrote a booklet, in both English and Welsh, entitled A duo-glott-exposition of the Creed, the ten Commandments and the Lords Prayer, calculated for the borders of England and Wales, but particularly for the use of the parish of Chirk, whose inhabitants are partly Welsh and partly English – the Welsh title was Sacrament Catechism, neu Gatechism i barattoi rhai i dderbyn Sacrament Swpper yr Arglwydd. The booklet was published in 1720 in Shrewsbury by the printer and bookseller Thomas Durston.
