= Hulme Hall =

Hulme Hall is the name of a number of buildings. It may refer to:

- Hulme Hall, Allostock
- Hulme Hall, Hulme
- Hulme Hall, Manchester
- Hulme Hall, Port Sunlight

It may also refer to the grammar school:

- Hulme Hall Grammar School
