= John Hulme (Shropshire cricketer) =

Welsh cricketer

John Arthan Hulme (born 13 November 1950) was a Welsh cricketer. He was a left-handed batsman who played for Shropshire. He was born in Chirk, Denbighshire, and educated at Malvern College and the University of London.

Hulme, who represented Gloucestershire Second XI in the 1970 season, and who represented Shropshire in the Minor Counties Championship between 1979 and 1983, made his only List A appearance in his final year at the club, against Somerset. From the opening order, he scored ten runs.

During his play for Shropshire (1970 to 1983) he appeared in 13 matches, totaled 357 runs with a best match score of 63, and he played club level cricket for Oswestry and Shrewsbury.
