= Hulme, Staffordshire =

Hamlet in Staffordshire, England

Coordinates: 53.0091°N 2.1005°W

Hulme is a hamlet on the outskirts of the city of Stoke-on-Trent, in the English county of Staffordshire. Unlike Hulme End and Upper Hulme, Hulme village is situated on the city council owned boundary of Park Hall Country Park.
