= Hume (soil) =

Hume is a soil type that is well drained and slowly permeable. Hume is formed from the erosion of shale and sandstone. Hume soils occur naturally on slopes and alluvial fans.

== See also ==
- Loam

== Notes and references ==
- Hume series description
