= Hume (given name) =

Hume is a masculine given name. Notable people with the name include:

- Hume Cronyn (1911-2003), Canadian actor
- Hume Cronyn (politician) (1864-1933), Canadian politician and lawyer, father of the actor
- Hume Feldman Academic, Cosmologist
- Hume Horan (1934–2004), American diplomat and ambassador
