= Hume Lake =

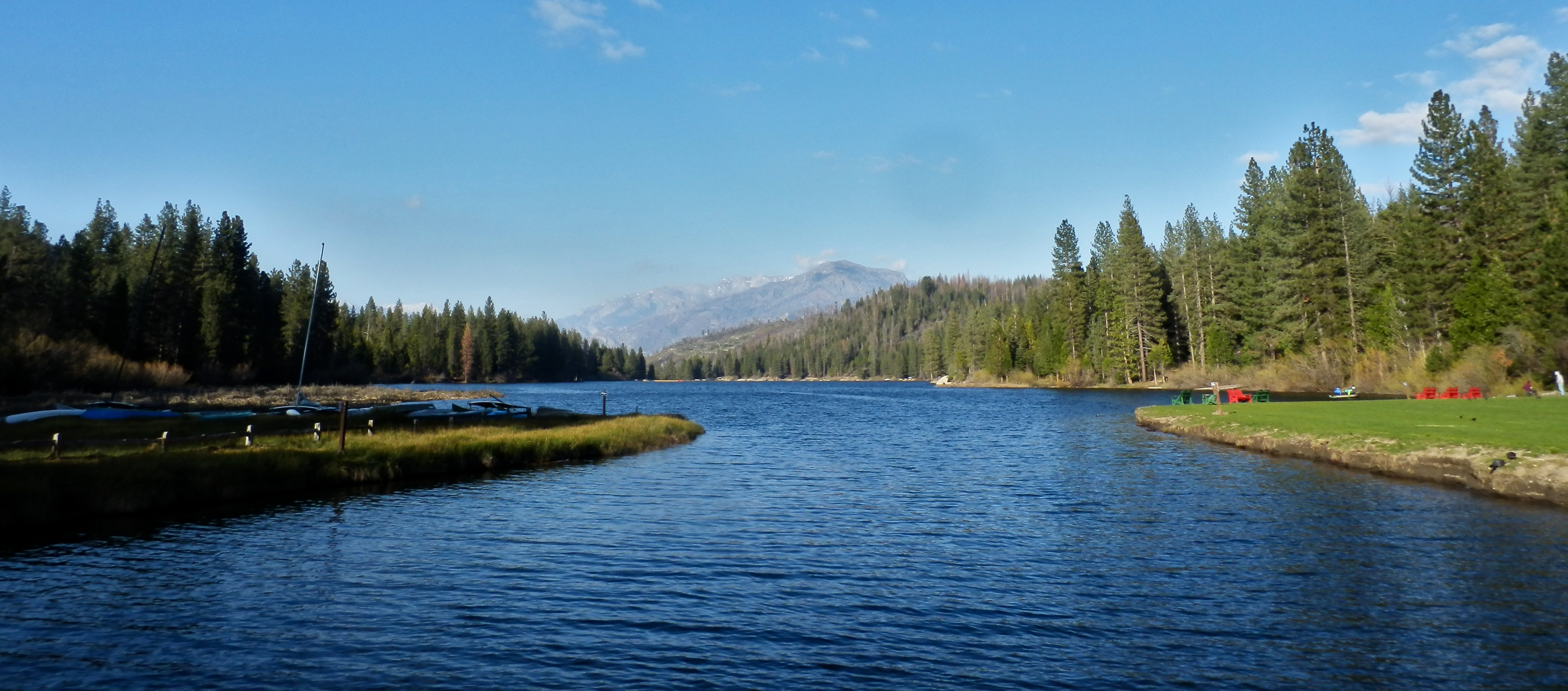

- Location within California Location within the United States
- Location: Sequoia National Forest; Fresno County, California
- Coordinates: 36°47′29″N 118°54′21″W
- Lake type: Reservoir
- Etymology: Thomas Hume
- Primary inflows: Tenmile Creek; Long Meadow Creek
- Primary outflows: Tenmile Creek
- Basin countries: United States
- Surface area: 87 acres (35 ha)
- Surface elevation: 1,585 m (5,200 ft)
- Settlements: Hume, California
- References: U.S. Geological Survey Geographic Names Information System: Hume Lake

Hume Lake is a reservoir in the Sierra Nevada, within Sequoia National Forest and Fresno County, central California.

Hume Lake is on Tenmile Creek, which is a tributary of the Kings River, and adjacent to the unincorporated community of Hume.

The surface elevation of the lake is 5,204.5 ft (1,586.34 m). It is accessible from California Route 180, via Forest Service road 30, and is about 51 miles (82 km) east of Fresno, not far from the west entrance to Kings Canyon National Park.

The 87-acre (35 ha) lake lies behind the world's first concrete reinforced multiple arch dam, designed by John S. Eastwood and constructed in 1908 by the Hume-Bennett Lumber Company. During lumber operations, the lake stored logs for an adjacent mill and supplied water for a flume used to transport the cut lumber to Sanger, California.

Since the cessation of logging in 1924, Hume Lake has shifted from primarily industrial use and is now mainly used for recreation.

== History ==
=== Formation ===
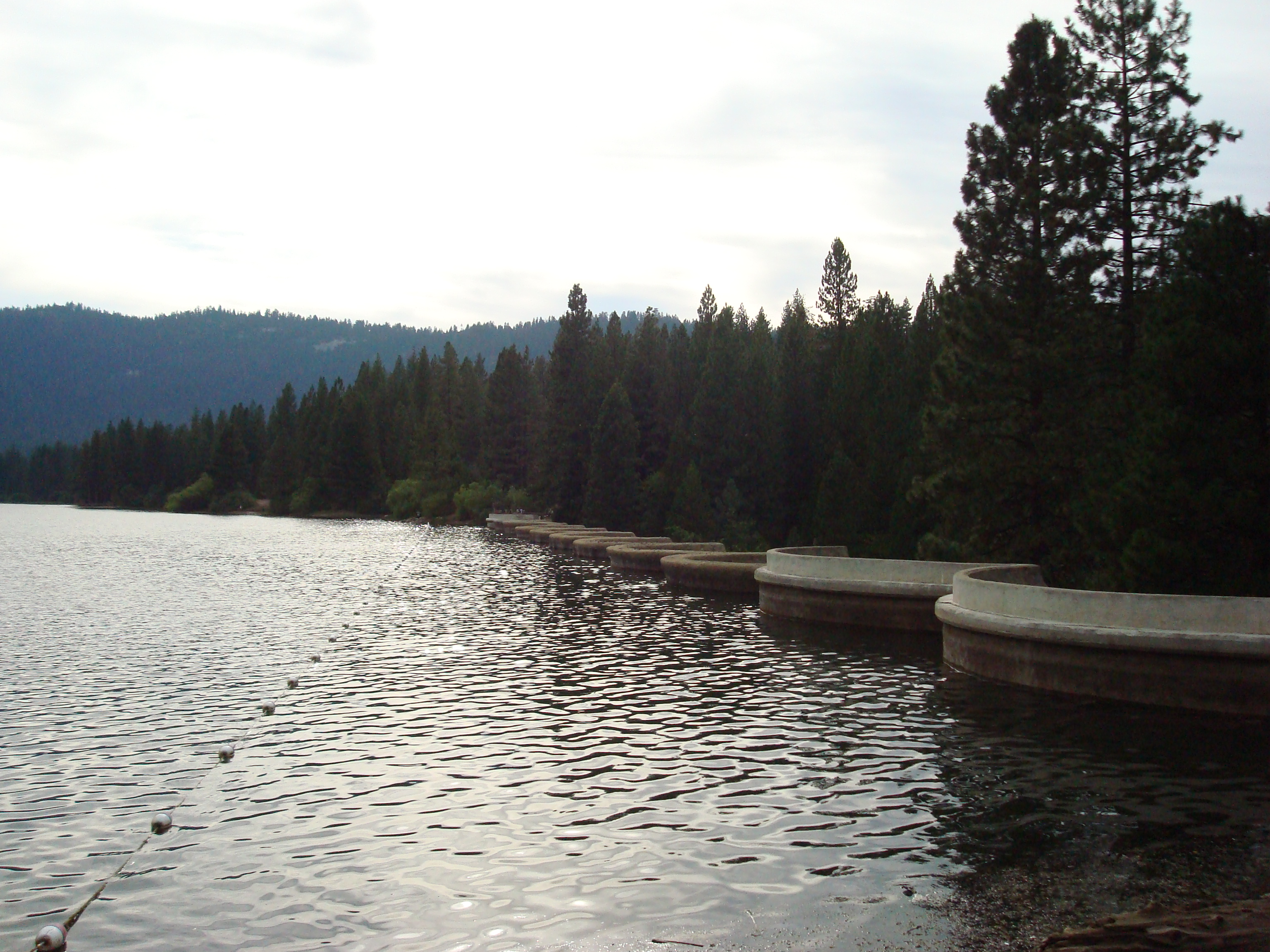
Dam impounding the waters of Hume Lake, illustrating the unique multiple arch construction designed by John S. Eastwood.

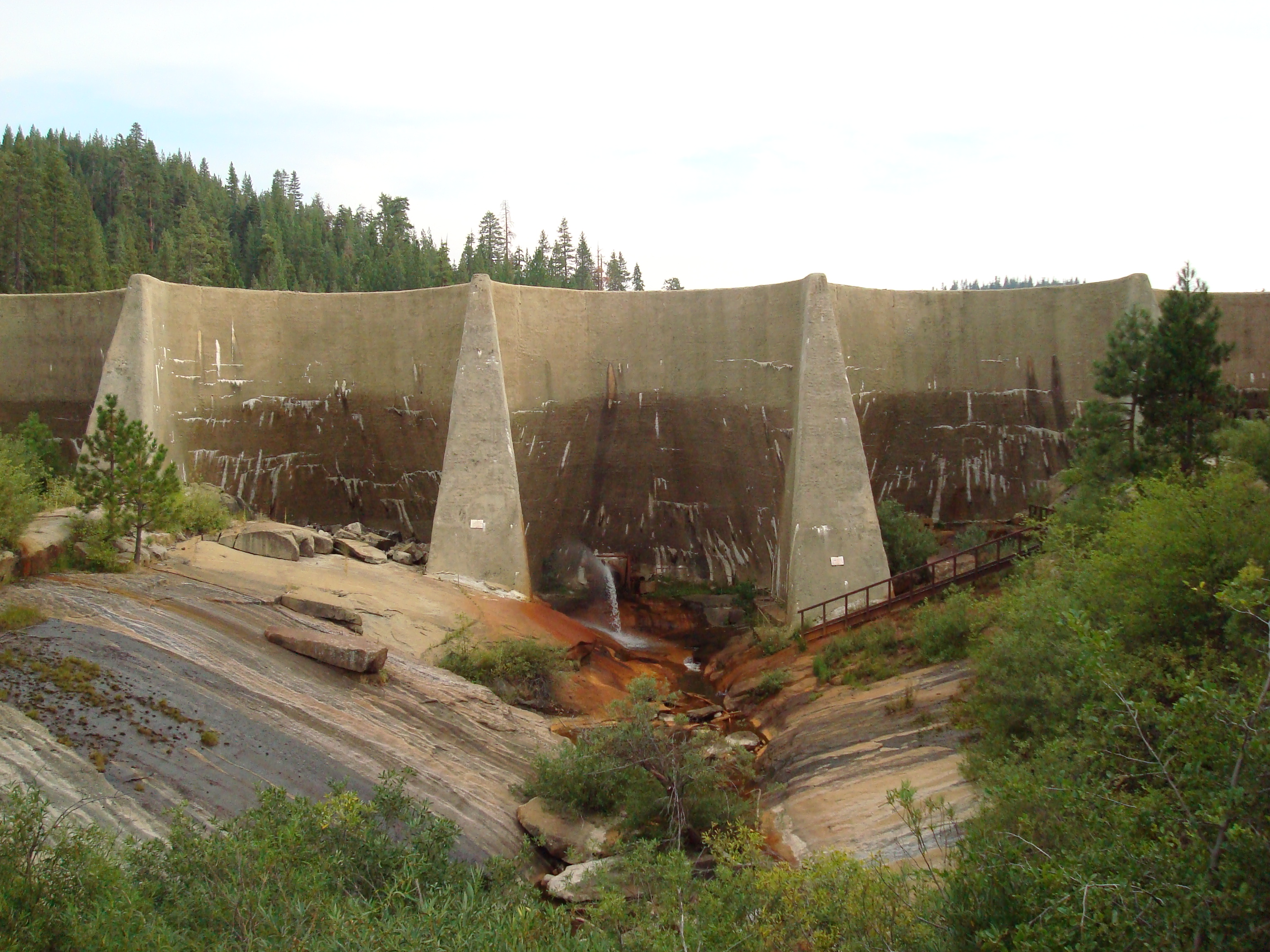
Another view of Hume Lake dam, displaying its reinforced concrete 50-foot (15 m)-span arches resting on inclined vertical buttresses. The Hume-Bennett mill once stood at this location beside the dam, directly in front of where this photograph was taken.

The Hume-Bennett Lumber Company was formed in 1905 when Thomas Hume and Ira B. Bennett purchased the Sanger Lumber Company. Little uncut lumber remained in the vicinity of the mill in the Converse Basin so a new location was sought closer to uncut stands of timber. This meant that the company would have to move deeper into the mountains. Tenmile Creek was the next tributary of the Kings River, 4 miles (6.4 km) east of Converse Basin. The creek flowed through an area known as Long Meadow. This location was promising for the company because it could be converted into a reservoir that would serve two functions for the company. First, it would provide storage for logs cut from surrounding virgin groves. From this body of water, floating logs could be drawn into an adjacent mill to be cut. Second, the rough cut lumber could then be transported out of the mountains in a flume filled with water from the reservoir.

To create this reservoir, John S. Eastwood was hired in 1908 to construct a dam at Long Meadow. Eastwood proposed constructing the world's first reinforced concrete multiple arch dam. Although unprecedented, at a cost of approximately $46,000, the dam's design was a significantly less expensive alternative to a conventional rock fill dam that would have cost about twice as much to construct. The dam was completed in only 114 days, by the end of 1909, along with a mill immediately adjacent to the dam. Logs were dumped into the reservoir by rail and floated to the dam where they were drawn up into the mill, cut and then dried in kilns next to the mill on the west bank of Tenmile Creek. From this location, lumber was floated to Sanger, California, in a flume filled with water from the reservoir. The flume was the longest ever created, eventually stretching 73 miles (117 km) from Hume Lake to Sanger. Designed and built by James Carroll Goss, the flume was used by both the lumber company and tourists. Thrill seeking tourists would occasionally ride in the flume down from the Sierras in special boats designed with an open prow so that water would help keep the boats from flying off into the air. The flume was also reputedly utilized in 1893 by the bandit Chris Evans, of the Evans-Sontag Gang of Train Robbers, who hid along the flume to evade capture after escaping from the Fresno County Jail with his accomplice Ed Morrell.

The dam and reservoir survive today little changed from their original appearance in 1908. The dam stands 61 feet (19 m) in height and extends 667 feet (203 m) in length. The dam is founded on granite bedrock and consists of twelve 50-foot-wide (15 m) arches, which are supported by intervening buttresses on the downstream side. The height was set at 61 feet (19 m) because of a tract of land not owned by Hume-Bennet along the reservoir's edge that would have been inundated by water if the dam had been built any higher. The water level was maintained at a level slightly lower than it typically is today, through the use of 5-by-8-foot (1.5 m × 2.4 m) spillway openings in the dam structure, which have since been filled.

=== End of logging ===
Hume-Bennett thoroughly harvested the forests surrounding Hume Lake following completion of the dam, but paltry profits and a devastating fire in 1917 led to the end of logging operations. The fire completely destroyed the mill and surrounding facilities, with all logging ceasing by 1924. On April 8, 1935, the United States Forest Service purchased the entire operation and its holdings, including the dam and forest surrounding Hume Lake, incorporating it into the Sequoia National Forest.

=== Dam repairs ===
From 1953 to 1954, the lake was drained for a safety inspection. During the inspection, it was apparent the dam was unfit and the lake would remain empty. The board of Hume Lake Christian Camps approached the California Fish and Game Department suggesting the dam be resurfaced. A six-inch cement coating was applied to the front face of the dam. The repairs were completed in 80 days and the lake was refilled.

== Current use ==
Since its purchase by the Forest Service, Hume Lake has become a popular destination, providing a variety of recreational opportunities:

- Camping at a United States Forest Service campground on the northern shore of the lake. The facility consists of 74 sites among four separate sections located at varying distances from the lake shore.

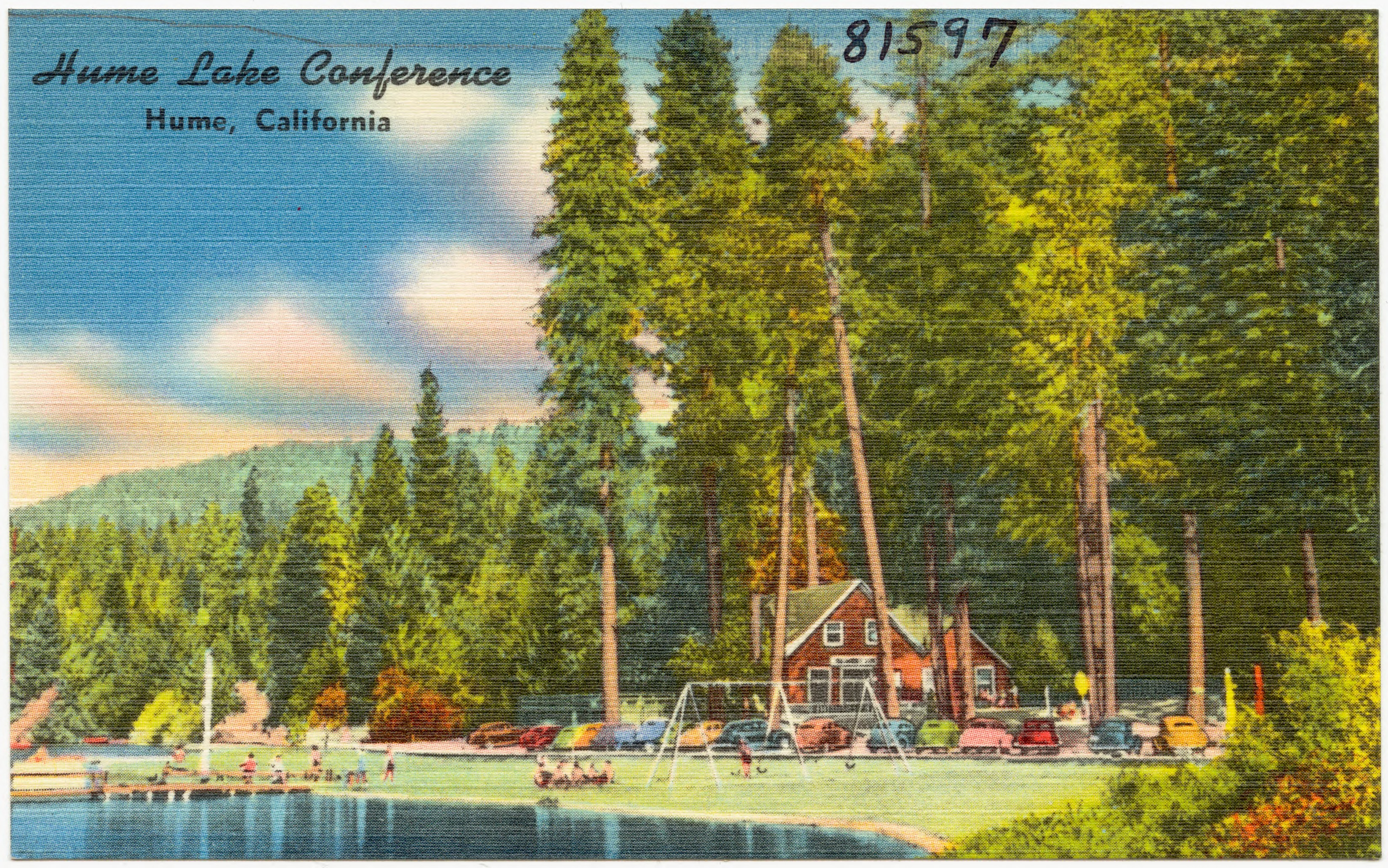
1940s conference postcard

- Hume Lake Christian Camps is the largest facility at the lake, which traces its origins to 1946, when the founders met in the nearby valley town of Dinuba to discuss plans for a Christian Bible camp. On January 9, 1946, 320 acres (130 ha) of lake shore property were purchased to create the camp, including the Hume Lake Hotel, store, service station, post office, 22 cottages, and 22 boats. Soon thereafter, in the summer of 1946, 670 campers and 15 volunteer staff attended conferences at Hume Lake. Since that first summer in 1946, more than a million young people and adults have attended the camp for worship, religious studies, and recreation. Activities at the camps include: swimming, disc golf, boating, hiking, biking, paint balling, high ropes course, climbing wall, and a number of recreational games such as Kajabe Kan Kan. Facilities include a dining hall, clothing company, a snack shop, two Hume-n-Beans coffee shops, the Ponderosa Pizza & Pizookie, a post office, a gift shop, a recording studio, swimming pool, beach access with rowboat, paddle board and kayak rentals, several lodges, a security booth, and public washing machines.
- Cabins available for private rental and private cabins owned by full-time and part-time residents
- Boating (non-motorized)
- Fishing: The main fishing at Hume Lake consists of trout
- Hiking
- Swimming and related beach activities
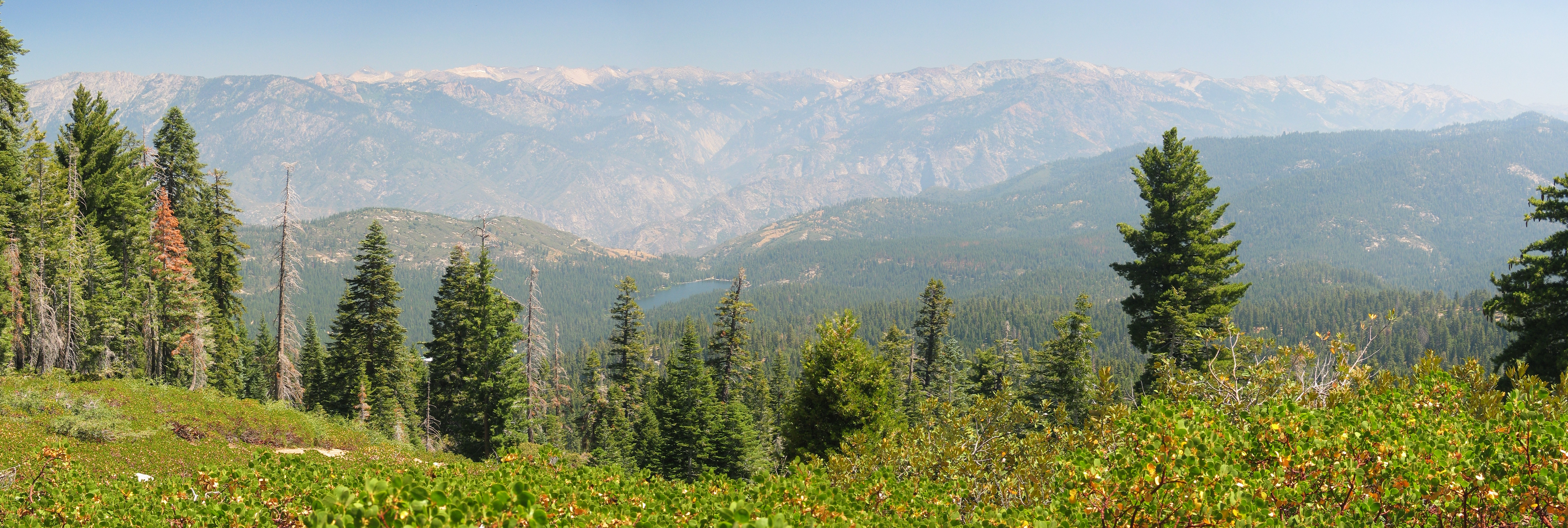
Panorama of the Sierra peaks surrounding Hume Lake.

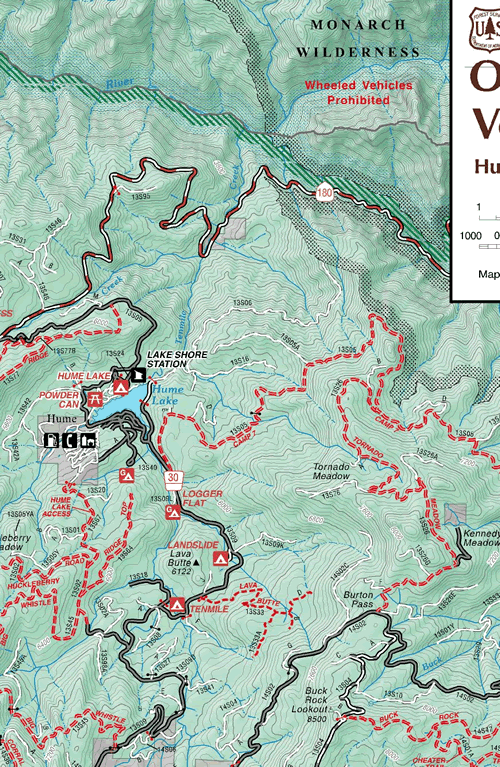
Topographical map of Hume Lake.

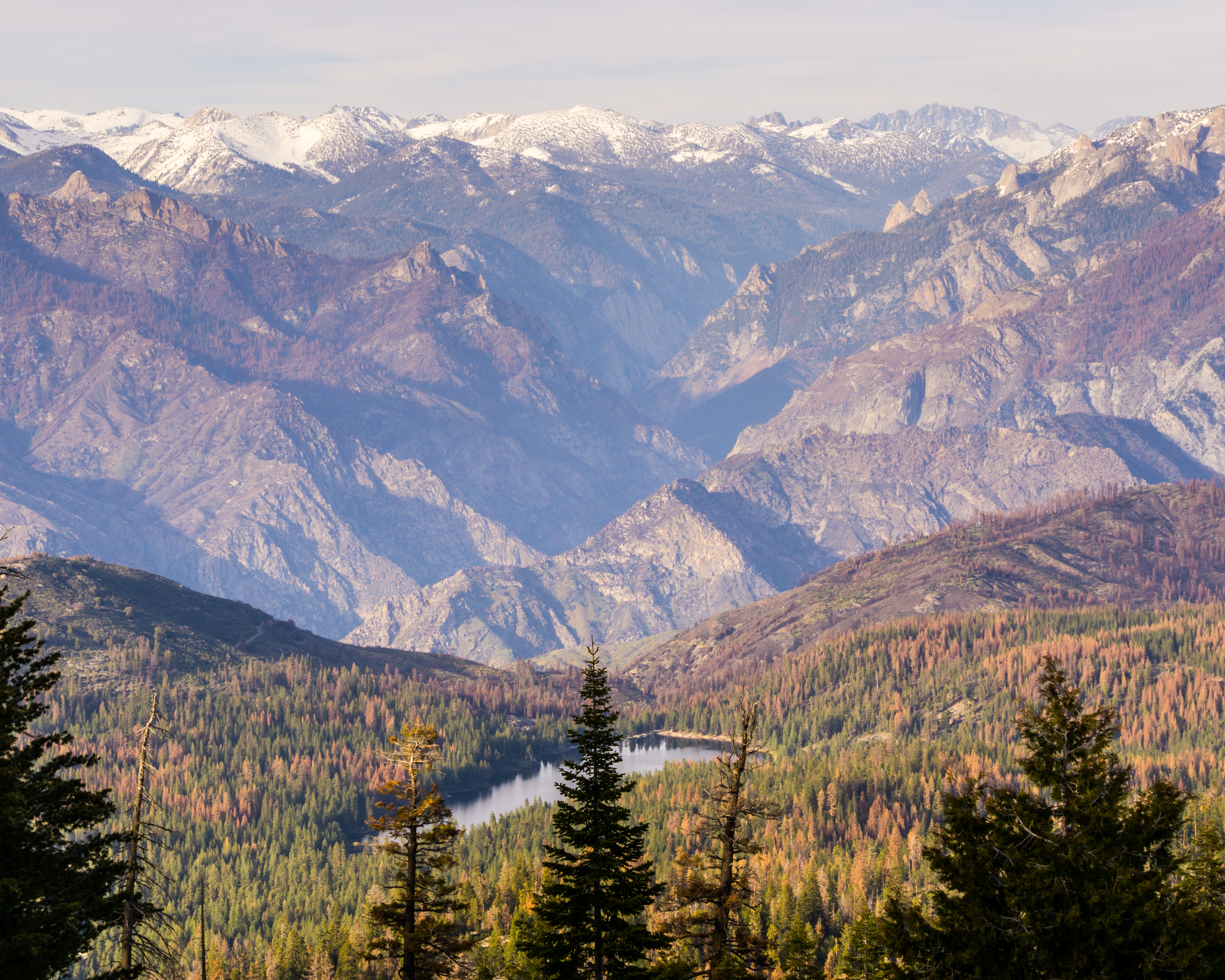
Hume Lake showing extensive mountain pine beetle damage as of April 2016.

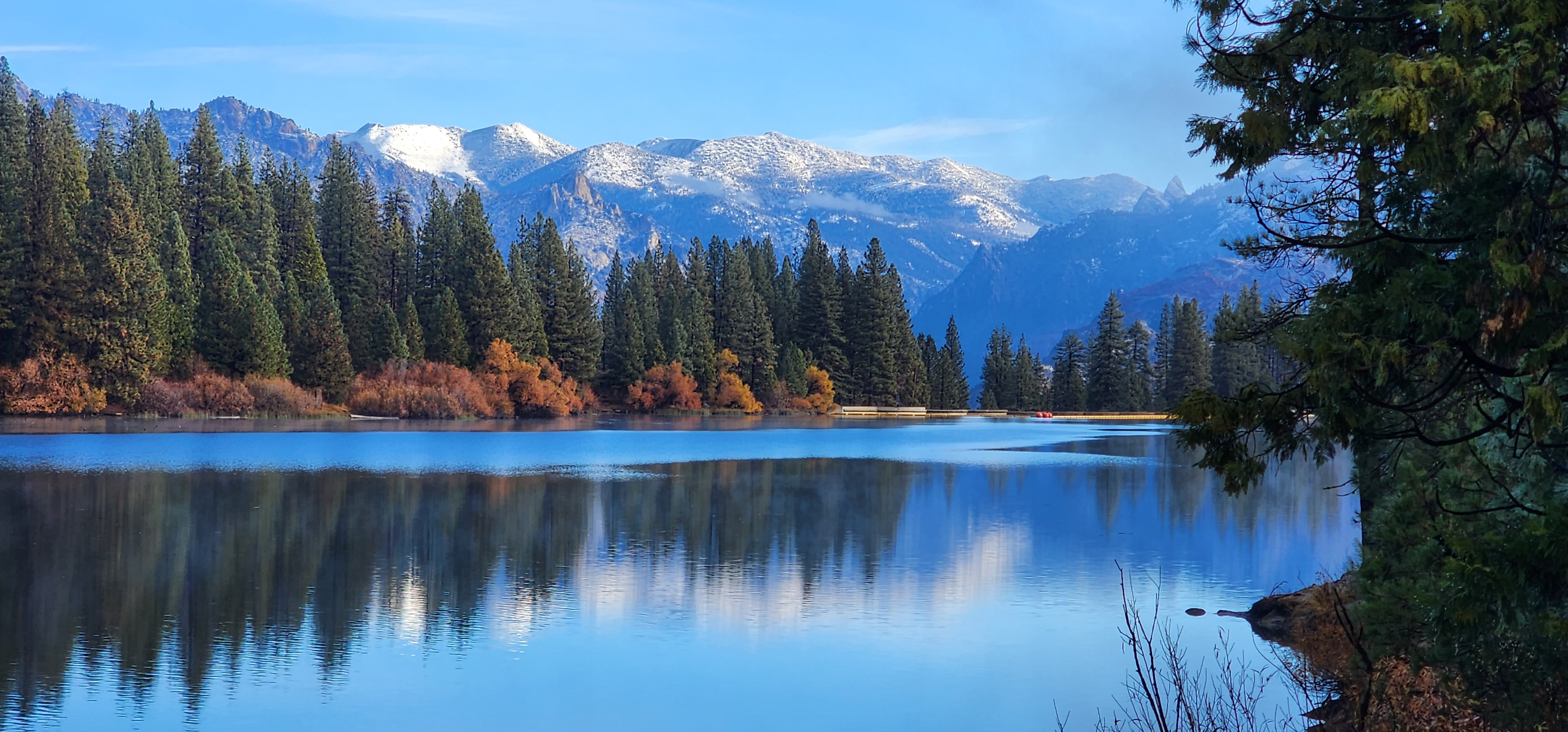
Image of Hume Lake in the winter

== In pop culture ==
- The 1922 film The Sawmill was filmed at Hume Lake.

== See also ==
- List of dams and reservoirs in California
- List of lakes in California
