= Hume Lake Christian Camps =

Christian parachurch organization based in Hume, California, United States

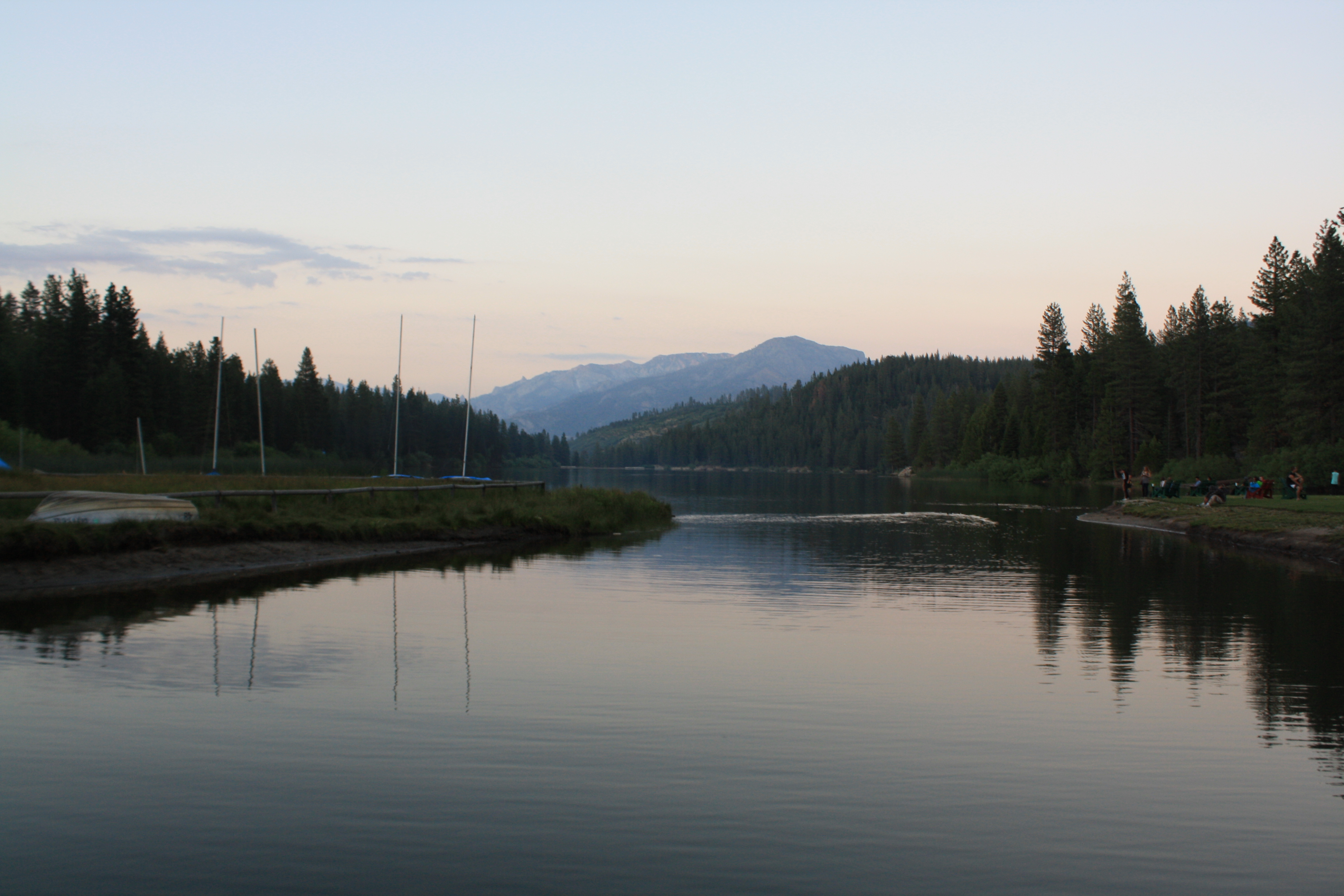
- Named after: Hume-Bennett Lumber Company
- Formation: January 9, 1946; 80 years ago
- Founder: Walter Warkentin
- Founded at: Dinuba, California
- Type: Parachurch organization
- Legal status: Non Profit
- Location: 64144 Hume Lake Road Hume, California
- Coordinates: 36.7873785°N 118.9136928°W
- Staff: 120-500 seasonally
- Website: hume.org

Hume Lake Christian Camps is a non-denominational, nonprofit parachurch organization that operates a large Christian camp and conference center at Hume Lake in California. Operating year-round camps and conference centers at multiple locations, Hume features programing for youth, family, and adults and has hosted cumulatively more than 1 million visitors. Hume's camps focus on Bible teaching and worship services.

== Hume Lake ==
Hume Lake is located in the Sequoia National Forest 65 miles east of Fresno, California in the unincorporated community of Hume, California adjacent to Hume Lake. Hume Lake is primarily a summer camp for students but also hosts various conferences and retreats. The 365 acre camp includes four chapels, three dining halls and various accommodations and can host up to 3,000 people at one time and hosts more than 40,000 annually. Hume Lake was built on the site of a 100 year old defunct logging town built by the Hume-Bennett Lumber Company and utilizes many of the original facilities.

=== Primary ministries ===
- Wagon Train is a camp for elementary-age students.
- Meadow Ranch is a camp for junior high students.
- Ponderosa is a camp for senior high students and is known for recreation including extreme sports like Kajabe Can Can.
- Wildwood is a camp for senior high students who are looking for discipleship.
- Joshua Wilderness Institute is a 9 month gap-year program for spiritual training.

== History ==
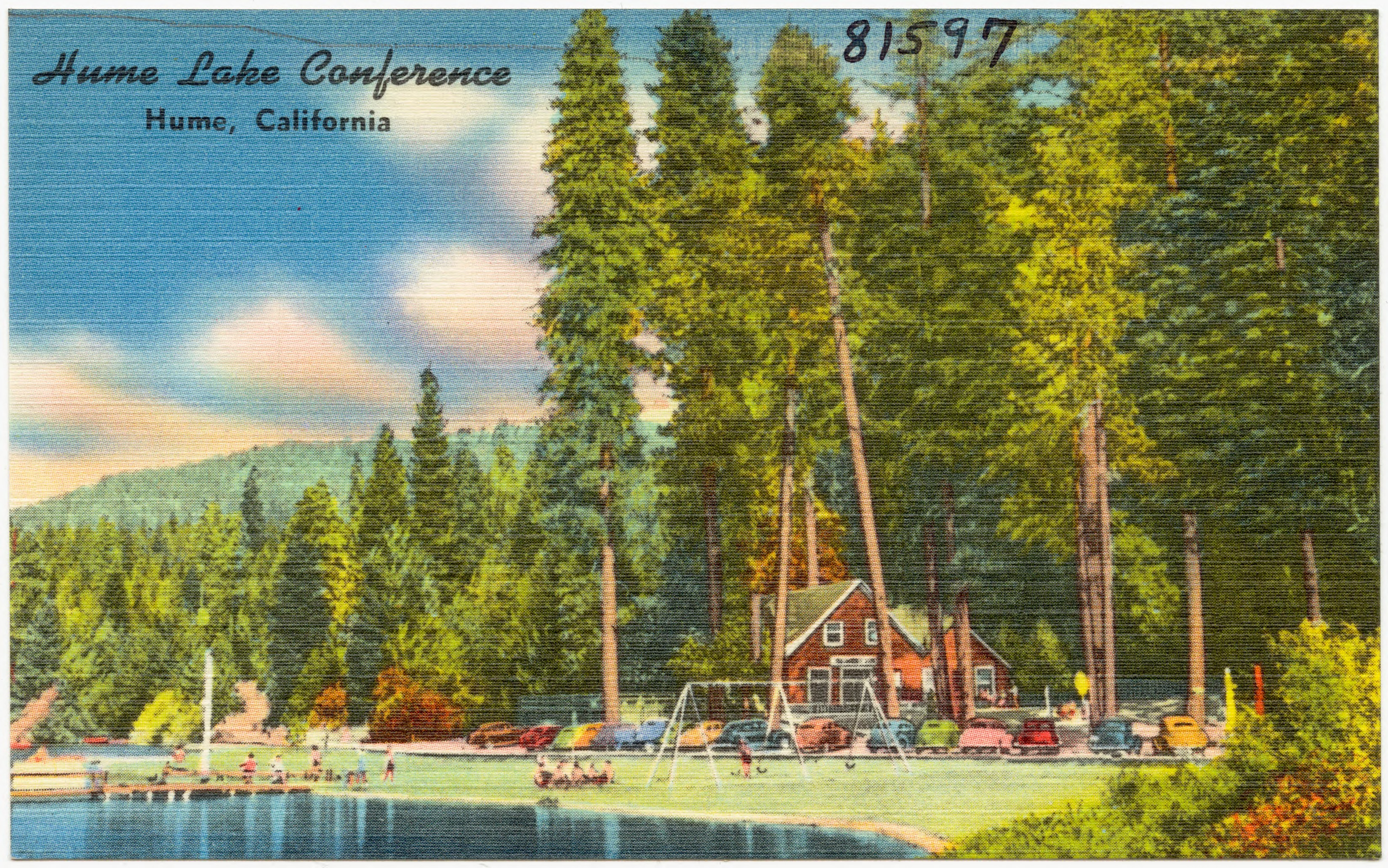
1940s conference postcard

Hume Lake Christian Camps began as Fellowship Conferences, and was founded by Walter Warkentin and partners in 1945 in Dinuba, California. Walt Warkentin, Dave Hofer, Hermon Pettit and John Strain formed a number of Christian organizations, including Fellowship Conferences, after meeting to pray about their relationship with God. Walter Warkentin was named director of Fellowship Conferences when the group drew assignments written on slips of paper that had been placed in a bible.

On January 9, 1946, 320 acres of land was purchased for the camp adjacent to Hume Lake at a cost of $140,000 and included the Hume Lake Hotel, store, service station, post office, 22 cottages and 22 boats. After the purchase, land was cleared for buildings and roads. Trees were selectively cut that posed safety risks yielding 2 million board feet of lumber. Don French managed a small sawmill that was built to handle the lumber. Many of the facilities were re-purposed from the mill town built by the property's original owners the Hume-Bennett Lumber Company.

In 1946, during the inaugural summer, 15 volunteer staff hosted 670 campers.

In 1963, Hume was expected to host 9,000 and by the end of 1966, 10,511 people would visit Hume.

In 1966, from December 2 to the 6th, a severe storm caused an estimated $19,000 in damages, destroying buildings, bridges and the waterfront.

In 1991, a dispute with the US Forest Service over the border of Hume was resolved. In 1978, it was discovered that part of the camp including the main office was built on Forest Service Land. After 13 years a land trade and boundary agreement was arranged that allowed the continued use of the land.

In 2011, Hume bought Hume New England in Monterey, Massachusetts.

In 2015, the Rough Fire threatened the camp, and on September 2, 2015, over 2,500 people were safely evacuated from the camp and surrounding area. All camp events were cancelled and only security personnel remained.

In 2020, in response to the global COVID-19 pandemic, all Hume locations closed. This marked the first time in 74 years that summer camp was cancelled.

In 2022-2023, Hume partnered with the U.S. Forest Service providing some of the funding for the Ten Mile Road reconstruction and Hume Lake Bridge replacement.
