= Hume, California =

Unincorporated community in California, United States

Hume
- Unincorporated community
- Location in California Hume (the United States)
- Coordinates: 36°47′06″N 118°54′49″W
- Country: United States
- State: California
- County: Fresno
- Named for: Hume Lake; Thomas Hume
- Elevation: 5,344 ft (1,629 m)

Hume (formerly Humes) is an unincorporated community in Fresno County, California, United States. It is located 50 miles (80 km) east of Fresno, at an elevation of 5344 feet (1629 m). Hume is located in the 93628 ZIP Code and is served by area code 559.

Hume is situated on the southern shore of Hume Lake in the Sequoia National Forest, near from the west entrance to Kings Canyon National Park. Much of the community and the lake is devoted to the tourism industry.

Many of Hume's residents live in the Hume Lake Subdivision.

In an article in 2015, Hume was characterized as the "most conservative community" in the state of California.

The largest facility at the lake is Hume Lake Christian Camps, a Christian camp and conference center.

== History ==
The Hume Lake Subdivision was built to finance the development of Hume Lake Christian Camps. John Strain conducted the original surveys for the subdivision and Don French built the roads and water systems. Two hundred forty-seven lots were subdivided on 99-year leases.

A post office operated at Hume from 1908 to 1924, and from 1938 to the present.

By 1986, over 230 homes were constructed in the Hume Lake Subdivision.

== Climate ==
Climate data for Hume, California (1981–2010)
Month	Jan	Feb	Mar	Apr	May	Jun	Jul	Aug	Sep	Oct	Nov	Dec	Year
Mean daily maximum °F (°C)	45 (7)	45 (7)	48 (9)	54 (12)	63 (17)	72 (22)	82 (28)	81 (27)	74 (23)	63 (17)	51 (11)	45 (7)	60 (16)
Mean daily minimum °F (°C)	26 (−3)	26 (−3)	28 (−2)	33 (1)	39 (4)	49 (9)	55 (13)	54 (12)	49 (9)	41 (5)	33 (1)	26 (−3)	38 (4)
Average precipitation inches (mm)	7.81 (198)	7.33 (186)	6.67 (169)	3.65 (93)	1.60 (41)	0.53 (13)	0.23 (5.8)	0.13 (3.3)	0.90 (23)	2.47 (63)	4.27 (108)	6.67 (169)	42.26 (1,072.1)
Average snowfall inches (cm)	35 (89)	39 (99)	43 (110)	16 (41)	4 (10)	0 (0)	0 (0)	0 (0)	0 (0)	3 (7.6)	12 (30)	27 (69)	179 (455.6)
Source: Bestplaces
