= Chief Sequoyah Tree =

Giant sequoia tree

Coordinates: 36°34′26″N 118°45′00″W

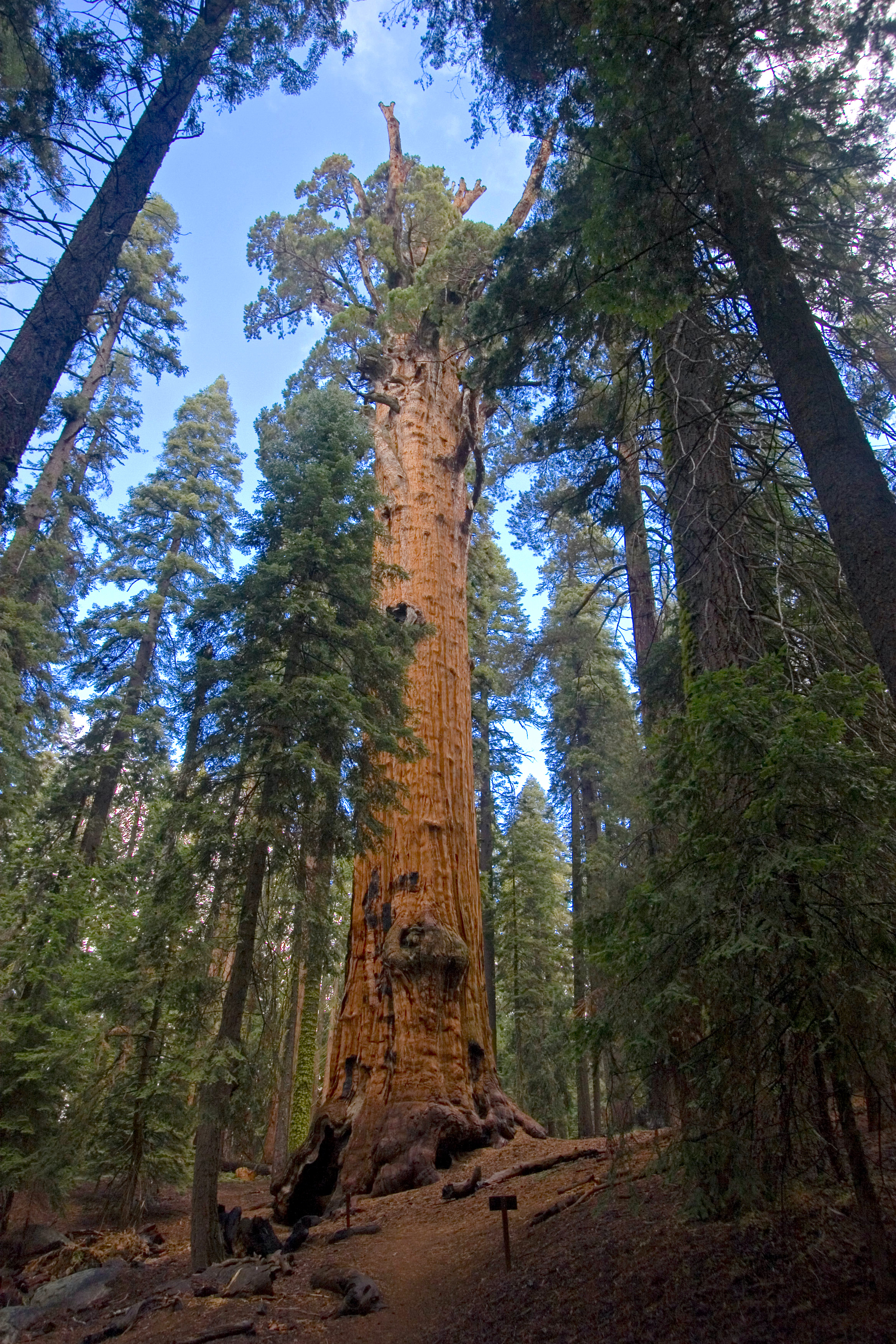
Chief Sequoyah Tree

The Chief Sequoyah Tree is a giant sequoia located within the Giant Forest of Sequoia National Park in California. It is the 9th largest tree in Giant Forest grove, the 27th largest giant sequoia in the world, and could be considered the 26th largest depending on how badly Ishi Giant atrophied during the Rough Fire in 2015.

== History ==
In 1928, Sequoia National Park superintendent Colonel John R. White named the tree to honor Sequoyah, a polymath of the Cherokee Nation who created the Cherokee syllabary in 1821.

== Description ==
The Chief Sequoyah Tree is located 140 ft (43 m) uphill from the much larger The President tree. The tree features an enormous burl on its southern face and is deeply fire scarred on its western face.

== Dimensions ==
Height above base	228.2 ft	69.6 m
Circumference at ground	90.4 ft	27.6 m
Estimated bole volume	33,608 cu ft	952 m^{3}

== Photo gallery (different angles of the tree) ==
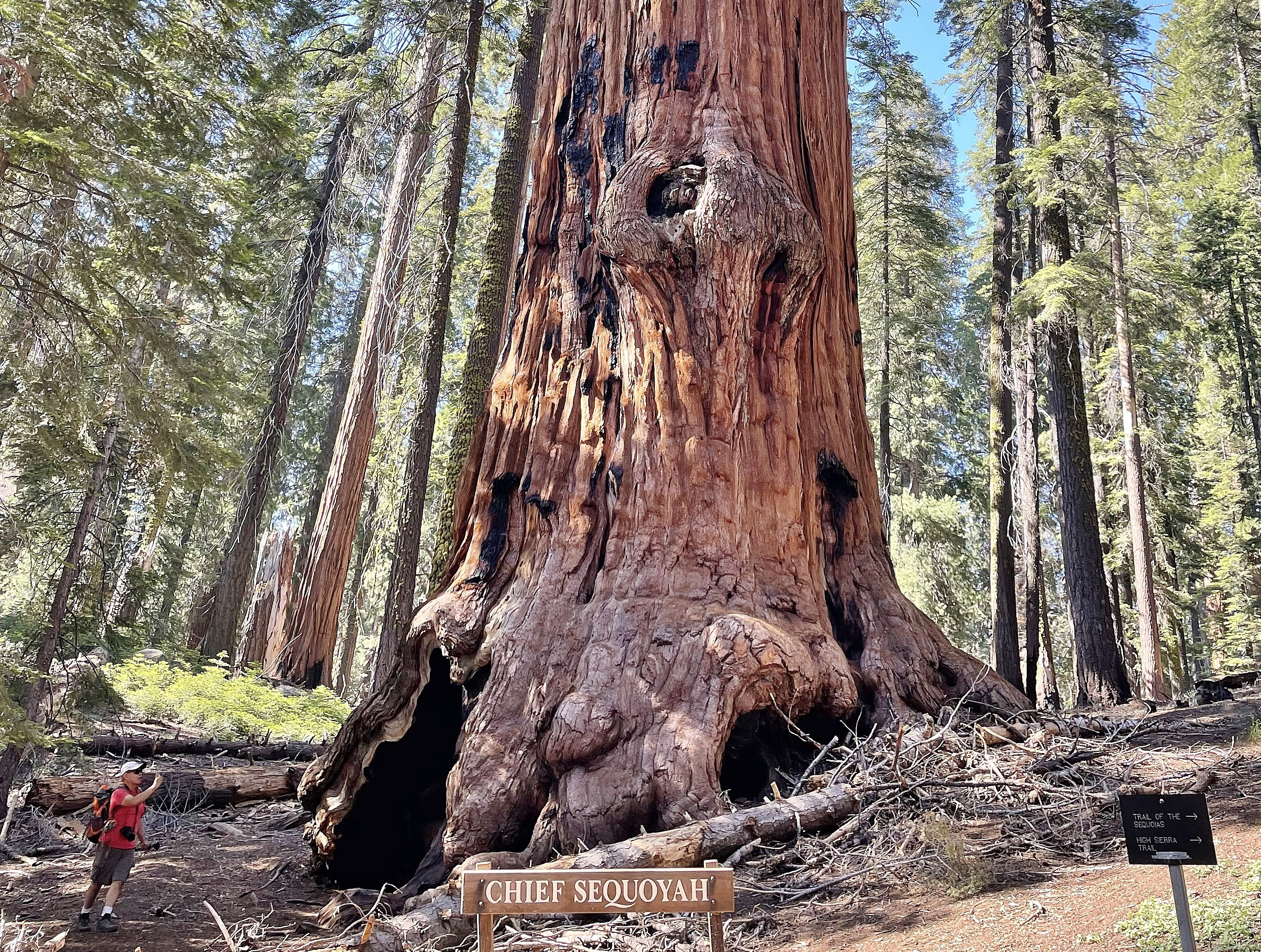

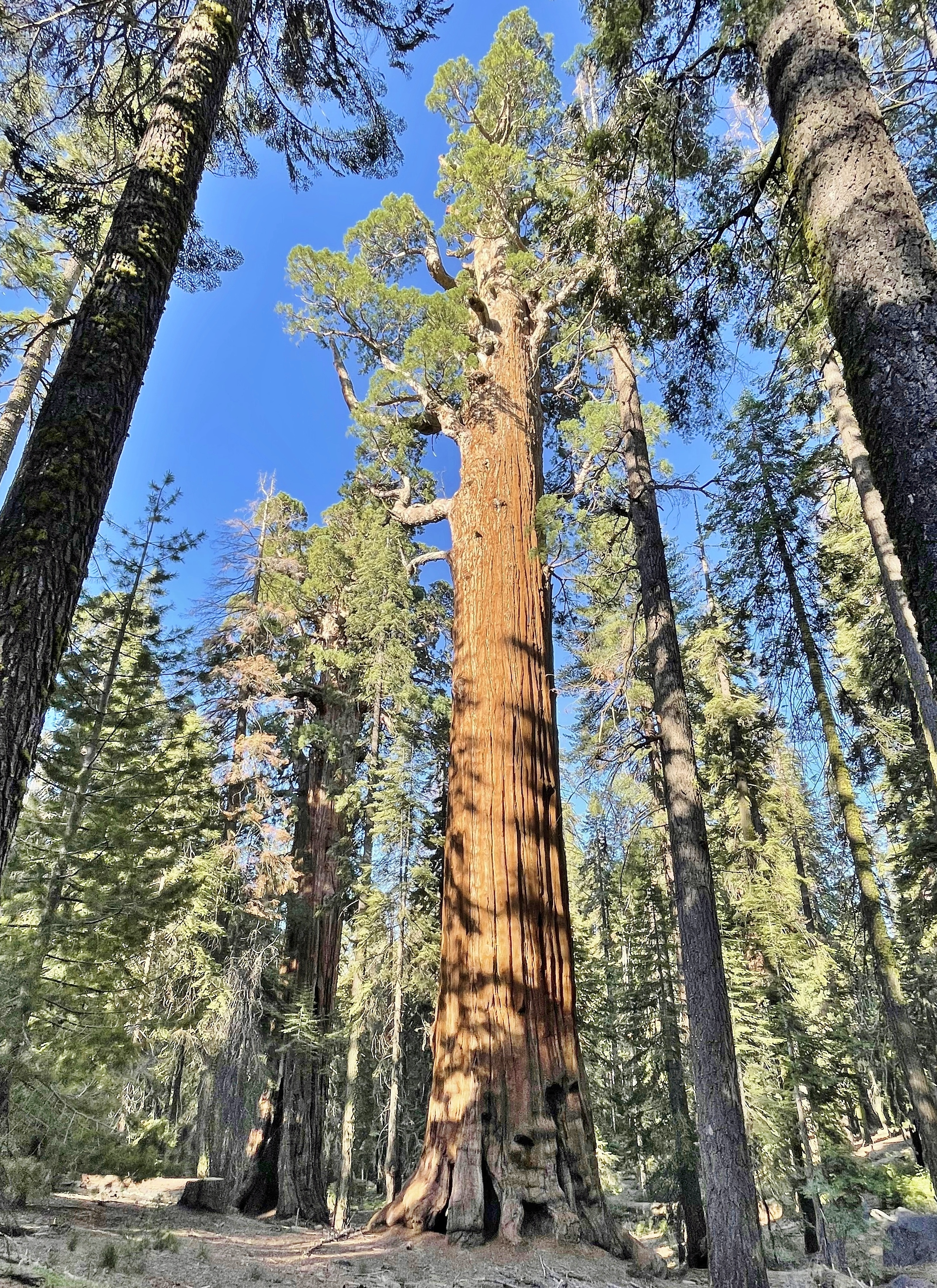

== See also ==
- List of largest giant sequoias
- List of individual trees
