= Washington Tree (Mariposa Grove) =

Giant sequoia in Yosemite National Park, California, US

Coordinates: 37°30′54″N 119°35′53″W

Washington is a giant sequoia located within Mariposa Grove in Yosemite National Park, California. The tree was named after Founding Father George Washington, the first president of the United States. It is the 18th largest giant sequoia in the world, and could be considered the 17th largest depending on how badly Ishi Giant atrophied during the Rough Fire in 2015. It is also the largest giant sequoia north of Boole.

== Description ==
Washington is located northeast of Columbia and General Sheridan. Washington features an almost pristine trunk with a thick crown hanging over its southern face. A small, 128 year old ponderosa pine can be found growing atop one of the limbs in Washington's crown.

The tree should not be confused with the Washington Tree of Sequoia National Park.

== Dimensions ==
Height above base	236.0 ft	71.9 m
Circumference at ground	95.7 ft	29.2 m
Estimated bole volume	35,901 cu ft	1,017 m^{3}

== See also ==
- List of largest giant sequoias
- List of individual trees
