= Genesis Tree =

Giant sequoia in California

Coordinates: 36.215119°N 118.669395°W

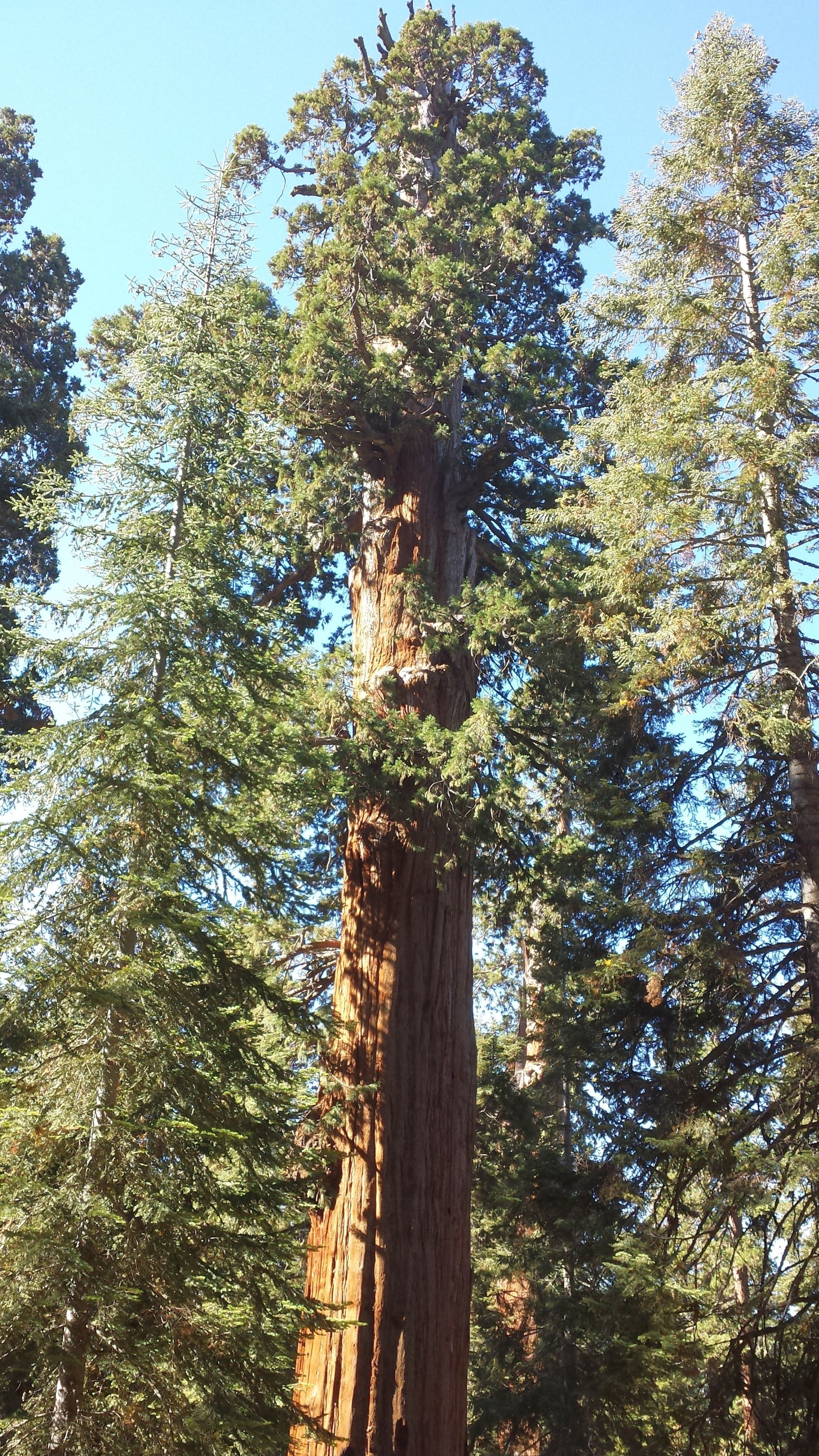
The Genesis Tree is the 7th largest tree in the world.

The Genesis Tree is a giant sequoia that is the seventh largest tree in the world. It is located within the Mountain Home Grove, a giant sequoia grove located in Mountain Home Demonstration State Forest in the Sierra Nevada of eastern California. The Genesis Tree was heavily damaged by the Castle Fire in 2020.

== History ==
The tree was named and discovered by Wendell Flint and Mike Law in 1985 while searching for "big trees" in the Sierra Nevada Mountains of California. They measured a massive, previously undocumented, tree that they observed in the Mountain Home giant sequoia grove, and determined that it is slightly smaller than the Boole tree in the Converse Basin grove in Sequoia National Forest, but with a more slender base and larger trunk. The Genesis Tree is also slightly larger than what was then the seventh largest tree in the world - the Franklin tree in the Giant Forest grove of Sequoia National Park - thereby making the Genesis Tree the seventh largest overall, and the largest tree in the Mountain Home grove.

== Dimensions ==
The dimensions of the Genesis Tree as measured by Wendell D. Flint. The calculated volume ignores burns. The volume of the tree after the Castle Fire remains unmeasured.

	Metres	Feet
Height above base	78.49	257.5
Circumference at ground	26.0	85.3
Circumference 4.5 ft (1.4 m) above ground	21.5	70.7
Diameter 5 ft (1.5 m) above ground	6.86	22.5
Diameter 60 ft (18.3 m) above ground	5.15	16.9
Diameter 120 ft (36.6 m) above ground	4.57	15.0
Diameter 180 ft (54.9 m) above ground	3.20	10.5
Estimated volume (m^{3}.ft^{3})	1,186.4	41,897

By 2013, the tree had grown to 86.2 meters (282.8 feet) in height and attained a girth of 24.04 meters (78.9 feet) at 1.37 meters (4.5 feet) above the base.

== See also ==
- List of largest giant sequoias
- List of individual trees
- Mountain Home Grove
