= List of largest giant sequoias =

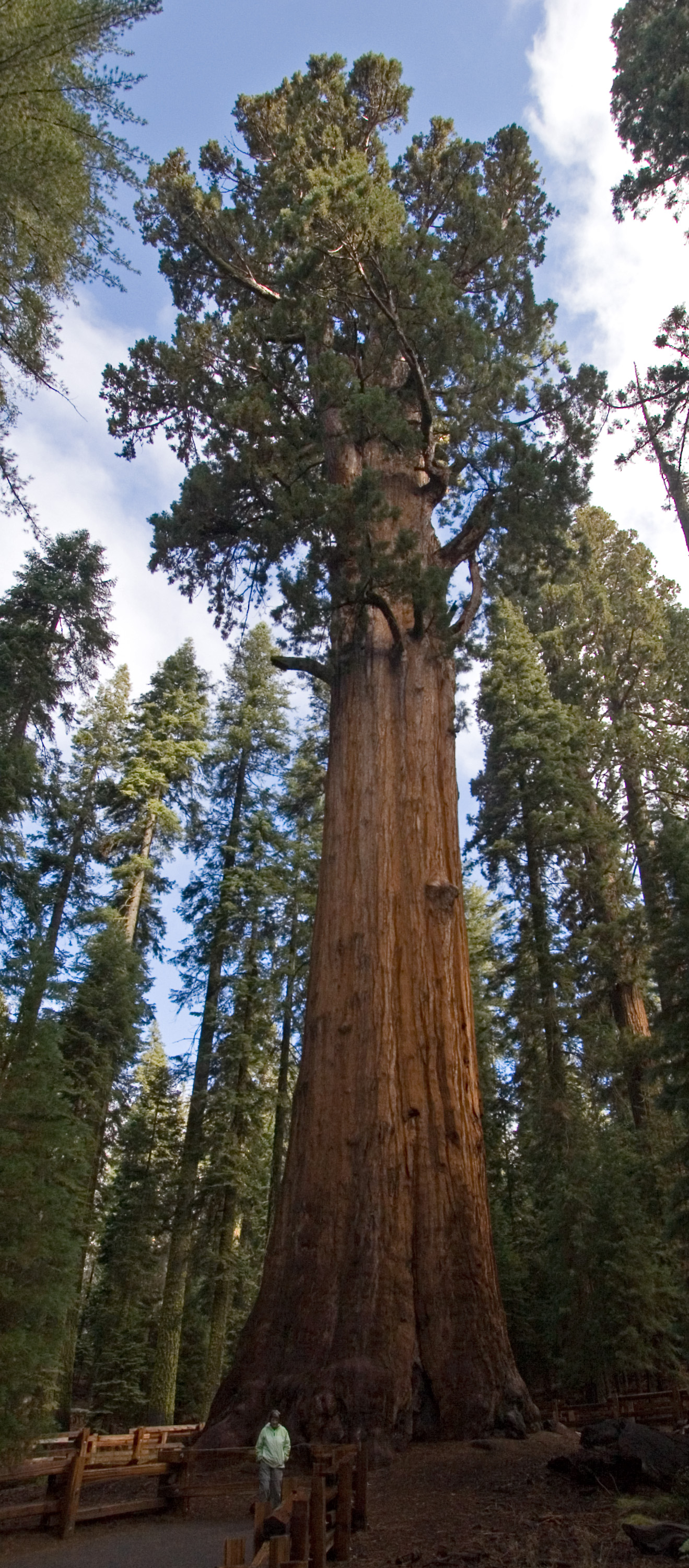
General Sherman Tree, Giant Forest Grove, Sequoia National Park, 2007

The giant sequoia (Sequoiadendron giganteum) is the world's most massive tree, and arguably the largest living organism on Earth. It is neither the tallest extant species of tree (that distinction belongs to the coast redwood), nor is it the widest (that distinction belongs to the African baobab or the Montezuma cypress), nor is it the longest-lived (that distinction belongs to the Great Basin bristlecone pine). However, with a height of 87 meters (286 ft) or more, a circumference of 34 meters (113 ft) or more, an estimated bole volume of up to 1,490 cubic meters (52,500 ft^{3}), and a documented lifespan of 3266 years, the giant sequoia is among the tallest, widest, and longest-lived of all organisms on Earth.

Giant sequoias grow in well-defined groves in California mixed evergreen forests, along with other old-growth species such as California incense cedar. Because most of the neighboring trees are also quite large, it can be difficult to appreciate the size of an individual giant sequoia. The largest giant sequoias are as tall as a 26-story building, and the width of their bases can exceed that of a city street. They grow at such a rate as to produce roughly 1.1 cubic meters (40 ft^{3}) of wood each year, approximately equal to the volume of a 50-foot-tall tree one foot in diameter. This makes them among the fastest growing organisms on Earth, in terms of annual increase in mass.

== Distribution ==
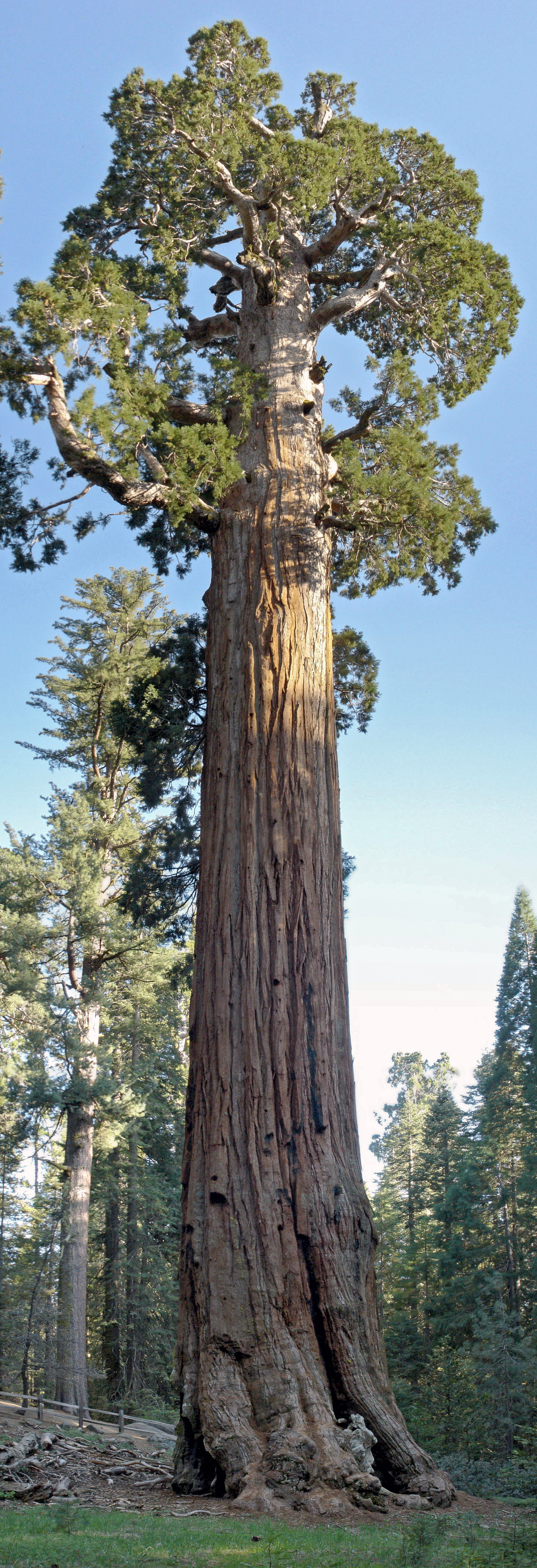
General Grant Tree, General Grant Grove, Kings Canyon National Park, 2007

Giant sequoias occur naturally in only one place on Earth—the western slope of the Sierra Nevada mountain range in California, on moist, unglaciated ridges and valleys at an altitude of 820 to 2,100 meters (2,700 to 6,900 ft) above mean sea level. There are 65–75 groves of giant sequoias in the Sierra Nevada, depending upon the criteria used to define a grove. The northernmost of these groves is Placer County Big Trees Grove in the Tahoe National Forest, Placer County, California, while the southernmost grove is Deer Creek Grove in the Giant Sequoia National Monument, Tulare County, California. The combined total area of all groves of giant sequoias is approximately 14,400 hectares (35,600 acres).

== Fire limits growth ==
Giant sequoias are in many ways adapted to forest fires. Their bark is unusually fire resistant, and their cones will normally open immediately after a fire. However, fire is also the most serious damaging agent of giant sequoias. Seedlings and saplings are highly susceptible to death or serious injury by fire. Larger giant sequoias are more resistant to fire damage, due to their thick protective layer of nonresinous bark and elevated crowns. However, repeated fires over many centuries may penetrate the bark and destroy the vascular cambium. Nearly all of the larger trees have fire scars, many of which cover a large area of the base of the tree. Older trees are rarely killed by fire alone, but the resulting structural damage may predispose a tree to collapse and fire scars also provide entry for fungi which may cause root disease and heart rot. The resulting decayed wood is then more easily consumed by subsequent fires. The result of this cycle is further structural weakening of the tree, which may eventually lead to its collapse.

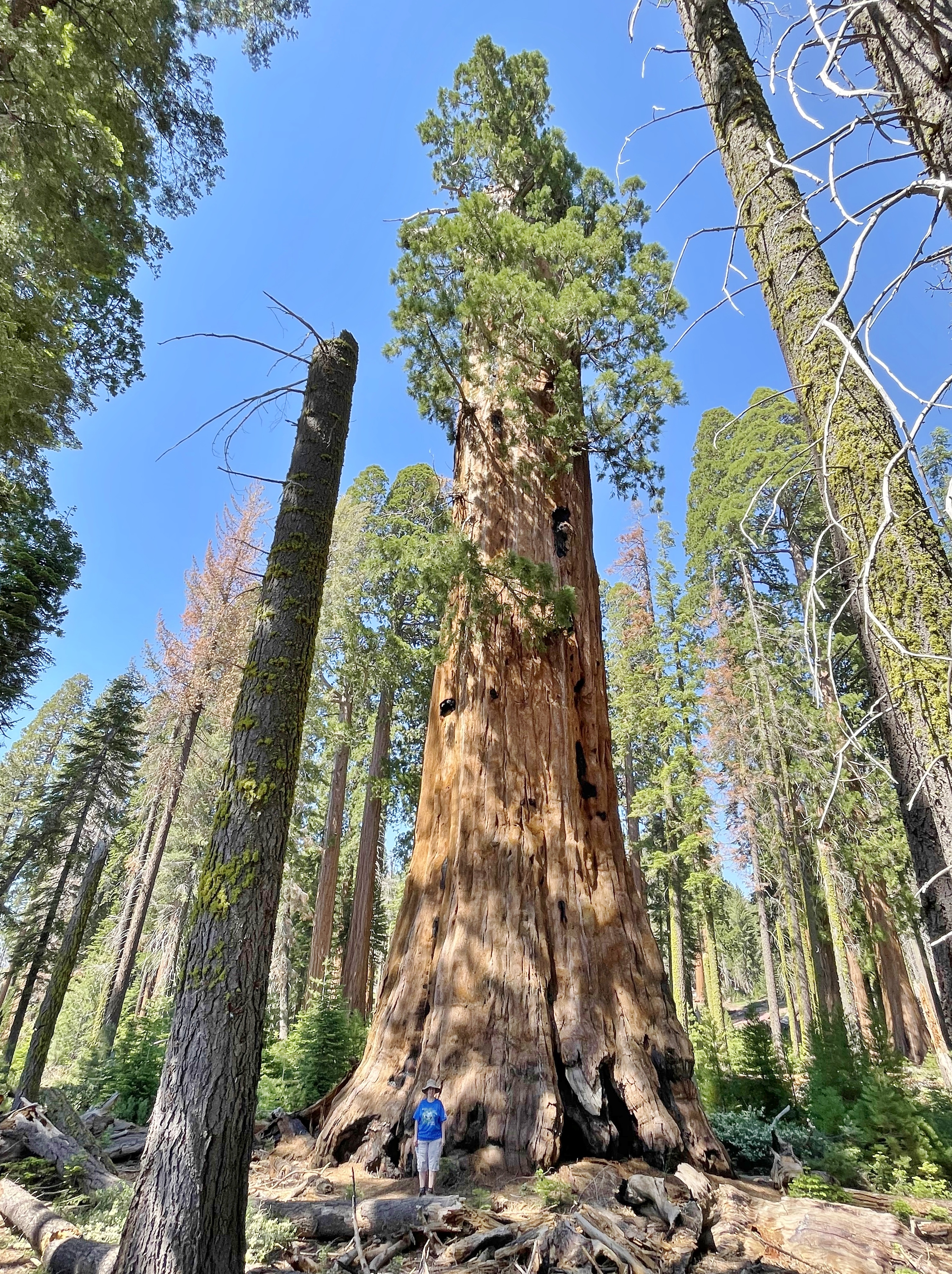
In 2023, there is healing/regrowth of the Washington Tree after the fire in 2005

Fire scars are thought to be the main cause of dead tops. Although lightning strikes rarely kill mature trees, lightning sometimes knocks out large portions of crowns or ignites dead tops. The most common cause of death in mature giant sequoias is toppling, due to weakening of the roots and lower trunk by fire and decay. The extreme weight of the trees coupled with their shallow root systems contributes to this weakening. Other causative factors include wind, water-softened soils, undercutting by streams, and heavy snow loads in the crowns.

The Washington Tree, located in the Giant Forest Grove in Sequoia National Park provides a good example of the aforementioned phenomenon. This tree was the second-largest tree in the world (only the General Sherman Tree was larger) until September 2003, when the tree lost a portion of its crown as a result of a fire caused by a lightning strike. This reduced its height from nearly 78 meters (255 ft) to about 70 meters (229 ft). The structurally weakened tree partially collapsed in January 2005, as the result of a heavy snow load in the remaining portion of its crown; it is now approximately 35 meters (115 ft) tall.

== Tree measurement ==
As with other trees, measurement of giant sequoias is conducted using established dendrometric techniques. The most frequent measurements acquired in the field include the height of the tree, the horizontal dimension of its canopy, and its diameter at breast height (DBH). These measurements are then subjected to tree allometry, which employs certain mathematical and statistical principles to estimate the amount of timber volume in a tree.

Calculating the volume of a standing tree is the practical equivalent of calculating the volume of an irregular cone, and is subject to error for various reasons. This is partly due to technical difficulties in measurement, and variations in the shape of trees and their trunks. Measurements of trunk circumference are taken at only a few predetermined heights up the trunk, and assume that the trunk is circular in cross-section, and that taper between measurement points is even. Also, only the volume of the trunk (including the restored volume of basal fire scars) is taken into account, and not the volume of wood in the branches or roots. The volume measurements also do not take cavities into account. For example, while studying sequoia tree canopies in 1999, researchers discovered that the Washington tree in Giant Forest Grove was largely hollow.

== List of largest giant sequoias by trunk volume ==
The following table is a list of the largest giant sequoias, all of which are located in California. The table is sorted by trunk volume, ignoring wood in the branches of the tree.

indicates a giant sequoia that sustained heavy fire damage after its most recent volume estimate.

| Rank | Name | Location | Coordinates | Height | Circumference | Bole Volume | Comments | Ref |
|---|---|---|---|---|---|---|---|---|
| 1 | General Sherman | Giant Forest Grove | 36°34′51″N 118°45′03″W | 83.8 m (274.9 ft) | 31.3 m (102.6 ft) | 1,486.9 m^{3} (52,508 ft^{3}) | Named after William Tecumseh Sherman. | |
| 2 (Note: This table presents giant sequoias sorted by the volume of their trunks. In December 2012, Stephen Sillett announced a measurement of the President tree with a total of 54,000 cubic feet (1,500 m^{3}) of wood and 9,000 cubic feet (250 m^{3}) of wood in the branches. Ranked according to the total amount of wood in the tree, the General Sherman tree is first, The President tree is second, and the General Grant tree is third. General Sherman has 2,000 cubic feet (57 m^{3}) more wood than the President tree.) | General Grant Tree | General Grant Grove | 36°44′53″N 118°58′15″W | 81.7 m (268.1 ft) | 32.8 m (107.5 ft) | 1,319.8 m^{3} (46,608 ft^{3}) | Named after Ulysses S. Grant; designated as the "Nation's Christmas Tree" since 1926. | |
| 3 | The President | Giant Forest Grove | 36°34′24″N 118°45′00″W | 73.4 m (240.9 ft) | 28.3 m (93.0 ft) | 1,278.4 m^{3} (45,148 ft^{3}) | Named after U.S. President Warren G. Harding. | |
| 4 | Lincoln | Giant Forest Grove | 36°34′19″N 118°45′22″W | 78.0 m (255.8 ft) | 30.0 m (98.3 ft) | 1,259.3 m^{3} (44,471 ft^{3}) | Named after Abraham Lincoln. | |
| 5 | Stagg | Alder Creek Grove | 36°11′29″N 118°37′08″W | 74.1 m (243.0 ft) | 33.2 m (109.0 ft) | 1,205.1 m^{3} (42,557 ft^{3}) | Named after Amos Alonzo Stagg. | |
| 6 | Boole | Converse Basin Grove | 36°49′26″N 118°56′57″W | 81.9 m (268.8 ft) | 34.4 m (113.0 ft) | 1,202.7 m^{3} (42,472 ft^{3}) | Named after Franklin A. Boole. The tree has the largest footprint of any living giant sequoia. | |
| 7 | Genesis | Mountain Home Grove | 36°12′54″N 118°40′10″W | 77.1 m (253.0 ft) | 26.0 m (85.3 ft) | 1,186.4 m^{3} (41,897 ft^{3}) | Named after Genesis. Heavily damaged by the Castle Fire. | |
| 8 | Franklin | Giant Forest Grove | 36°34′04″N 118°45′31″W | 68.2 m (223.8 ft) | 28.9 m (94.8 ft) | 1,169 m^{3} (41,280 ft^{3}) | Named after Benjamin Franklin. Located near Washington. | |
| 9 | King Arthur | Garfield Grove | 36°19′42″N 118°43′01″W | 82.4 m (270.3 ft) | 31.8 m (104.2 ft) | 1,151.2 m^{3} (40,656 ft^{3}) | Named after King Arthur. Destroyed in the Castle Fire. | |
| 10 | Monroe | Giant Forest Grove | 36°33′26″N 118°46′10″W | 75.5 m (247.8 ft) | 27.8 m (91.3 ft) | 1,135.6 m^{3} (40,104 ft^{3}) | Named after James Monroe, located near Auto Log. | |
| 11 | Robert E. Lee | General Grant Grove | 36°44′53″N 118°58′16″W | 77.6 m (254.7 ft) | 26.9 m (88.3 ft) | 1,135.6 m^{3} (40,102 ft^{3}) | Named after Robert E. Lee. | |
| 12 | Floyd Otter | Garfield Grove | 36°19′39″N 118°43′01″W | 83.2 m (273.1 ft) | 30.3 m (99.5 ft) | 1,120.3 m^{3} (39,562 ft^{3}) | Named after Floyd Otter, a former manager of the Mountain Home Demonstration State Forest. Possibly heavy damage from Castle Fire. | |
| 13 | John Adams | Giant Forest Grove | | 76.4 m (250.6 ft) | 25.4 m (83.3 ft) | 1,103.1 m^{3} (38,956 ft^{3}) | Named after John Adams, located near Cattle Cabin. | |
| 14 | Ishi Giant | Kennedy Grove | 36°45′41″N 118°48′38″W | 75.6 m (248.1 ft) | 32.0 m (105.1 ft) | 1,080.5 m^{3} (38,156 ft^{3}) | Lost significant trunk volume and over 8 m (26 ft) in height during the 2015 Rough Fire. New volume and height estimates needed to determine the current size of the tree. | |
| 15 | Column | Giant Forest Grove | | 74.3 m (243.8 ft) | 28.3 m (93.0 ft) | 1,056.1 m^{3} (37,295 ft^{3}) | Located near Pershing. | |
| 16 | Summit Road | Mountain Home Grove | 36°13′41″N 118°40′16″W | 74.4 m (244.0 ft) | 25.1 m (82.2 ft) | 1,040 m^{3} (36,600 ft^{3}) | Named after a nearby road. Possible heavy damage from the Castle Fire. | |
| 17 | Euclid | Mountain Home Grove | 36°13′46″N 118°40′40″W | 83.1 m (272.7 ft) | 25.4 m (83.4 ft) | 1,022.9 m^{3} (36,122 ft^{3}) | Named after Euclid. | |
| 18 | Washington | Mariposa Grove | 37°30′54″N 119°35′53″W | 71.9 m (236.0 ft) | 29.2 m (95.7 ft) | 1,016.6 m^{3} (35,901 ft^{3}) | The largest giant sequoia north of Boole. Named after George Washington. Not to be confused with the Washington tree of Giant Forest Grove. | |
| 19 | Pershing | Giant Forest Grove | 36°34′43″N 118°45′12″W | 75.0 m (246.0 ft) | 27.8 m (91.2 ft) | 1,015.3 m^{3} (35,855 ft^{3}) | Named after John J. Pershing. | |
| 20 | Diamond | Atwell Mill Grove | 36°27′48″N 118°41′51″W | 87.2 m (286.0 ft) | 29.0 m (95.3 ft) | 999.4 m^{3} (35,292 ft^{3}) | Named for a large diamond-shaped scar present on the southeastern side of the trunk. | |
| 21 | Adam | Mountain Home Grove | 36°14′36″N 118°40′22″W | 75.4 m (247.4 ft) | 28.7 m (94.2 ft) | 991.6 m^{3} (35,017 ft^{3}) | Named after Adam. | |
| 22 | Roosevelt | Redwood Mountain Grove | 36°41′38″N 118°55′08″W | 79.2 m (260.0 ft) | 24.4 m (80.0 ft) | 991.5 m^{3} (35,013 ft^{3}) | Named after Theodore Roosevelt. Killed in the KNP Complex Fire of 2021. | |
| 23 | Nelder | Nelder Grove | 37°26′29″N 119°35′47″W | 81.1 m (266.2 ft) | 27.4 m (90.0 ft) | 990.9 m^{3} (34,993 ft^{3}) | Named after John A. Nelder. | |
| 24 | Above Diamond (AD) | Atwell Mill Grove | 36°27′53″N 118°41′36″W | 73.9 m (242.4 ft) | 30.2 m (99.0 ft) | 982.8 m^{3} (34,706 ft^{3}) | Situated just above Diamond, hence the name "AD". | |
| 25 | Hart | Redwood Mountain Grove | | 84.7 m (277.9 ft) | 23.0 m (75.3 ft) | 974.3 m^{3} (34,407 ft^{3}) | Named after Michael Hart, who discovered it. | |
| 26 | Grizzly Giant | Mariposa Grove | 37°30′12.65″N 119°36′2.39″W | 63.7 m (209.0 ft) | 28.2 m (92.5 ft) | 962.9 m^{3} (34,005 ft^{3}) | Originally named the "Grizzled Giant" by Galen Clark. | |
| 27 | Chief Sequoyah | Giant Forest Grove | 36°34′26″N 118°45′00″W | 69.6 m (228.2 ft) | 27.6 m (90.4 ft) | 951.7 m^{3} (33,608 ft^{3}) | Named after Sequoyah. | |
| 28 | Methuselah | Mountain Home Grove | 36°14′25″N 118°40′49″W | 63.3 m (207.8 ft) | 29.2 m (95.8 ft) | 931.5 m^{3} (32,897 ft^{3}) | Named after Methuselah. | |
| 29 | Great Goshawk | Freeman Creek Grove | | 77.8 m (255.2 ft) | 27.5 m (90.2 ft) | 928.3 m^{3} (32,783 ft^{3}) | The largest giant sequoia south of Stagg. Named after the Northern goshawk, a hawk native to the Sierra Nevada. | |
| 30 | Hamilton | Giant Forest Grove | 36°32′58″N 118°45′55″W | 72.7 m (238.5 ft) | 25.2 m (82.6 ft) | 928.3 m^{3} (32,783 ft^{3}) | Named after Alexander Hamilton. | |
| 31 | Dean | Atwell Mill Grove | 36°28′12″N 118°40′58″W | 71.9 m (235.9 ft) | 29.4 m (96.4 ft) | 915.6 m^{3} (32,333 ft^{3}) | Named after a carving of the name "Dean" that was found on a charred area of the trunk by Wendell D. Flint in 1950. | |
| 32 | Black Mountain Beauty | Black Mountain Grove | 36°06′58″N 118°40′31″W | 80.2 m (263.0 ft) | 23.2 m (76.0 ft) | 912.5 m^{3} (32,224 ft^{3}) | Also known as "Black Mountain Shaft". The tree lost significant volume after it burned during the 2017 Pier Fire. New volume estimate needed to determine the current volume of the tree. | |

=== Notes ===
- The trees Named "Franklin", "Column", "Monroe", "Hamilton" and "Adams" were named by Wendell Flint and others. These five are now included on the official map of Giant Forest, where they are all situated.
- The Washington Tree (not listed above) was previously arguably the second largest tree with a volume of 1,354.96 m^{3} (47,850 ft^{3}) (although the upper half of its trunk was hollow, making the calculated volume debatable), but after losing the hollow upper half of its trunk in January 2005 following a fire, it is no longer of exceptional size. Some sources leave open the possibility that this tree may have been larger than even General Sherman in the past
- The Hazelwood Tree (not listed above) had a volume of 1,025.86 m^{3} (36,228 ft^{3}) before losing half its trunk in a lightning storm in 2002, if it were still at full size it would currently be the 17th largest giant sequoia on earth.
- The largest giant sequoia killed at the hands of man was the Discovery Tree at Calaveras Grove, which was cut down a year after its discovery. Another tree nearby, the huge Mother of the Forest, was mortally wounded when its bark was removed to be put on display on the East Coast.
- The largest giant sequoia ever recorded, as well as potentially the largest tree which ever lived, was the Father of the Forest from Calaveras Grove. The exceedingly enormous tree collapsed centuries ago, and its still relatively well-preserved remains have turned into a popular tourist attraction. The tree was reportedly over 400 ft tall and 110 ft in circumference when it fell.

== Several of the largest sequoia trees ==
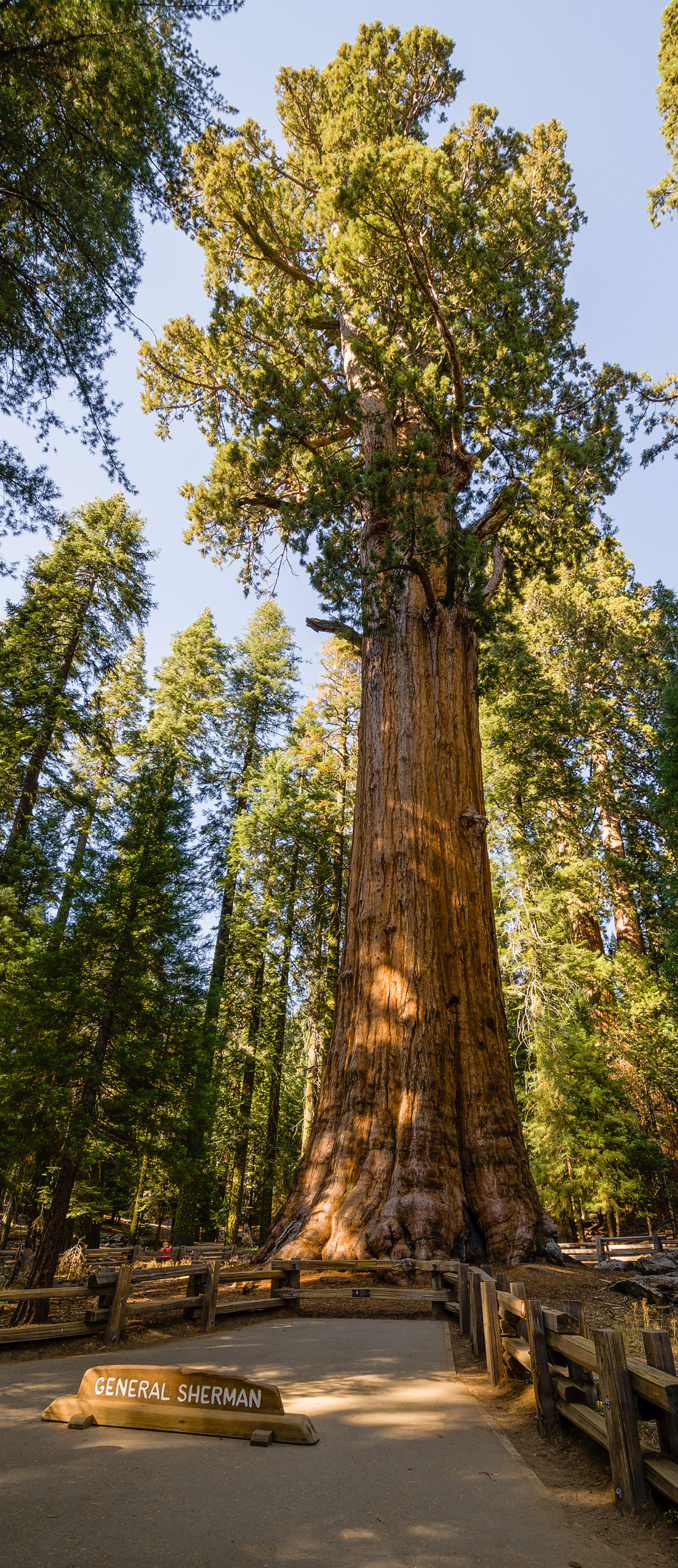
General Sherman (Sequoia National Park)

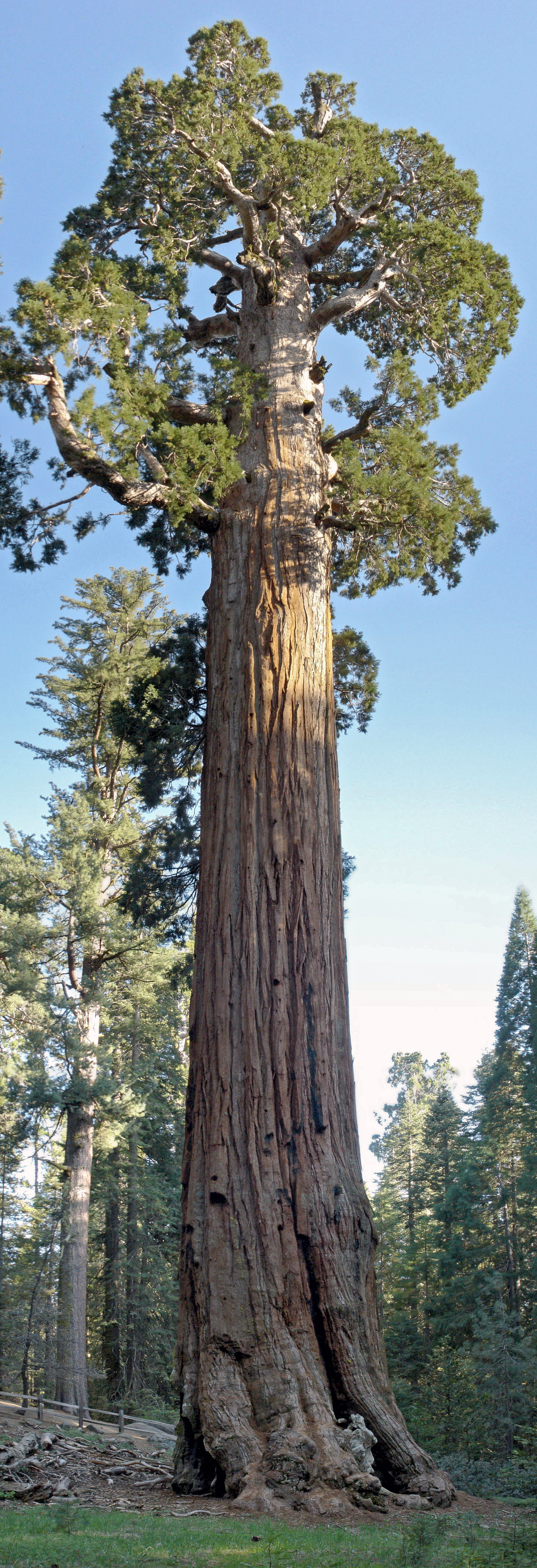
General Grant (Kings Canyon National Park)

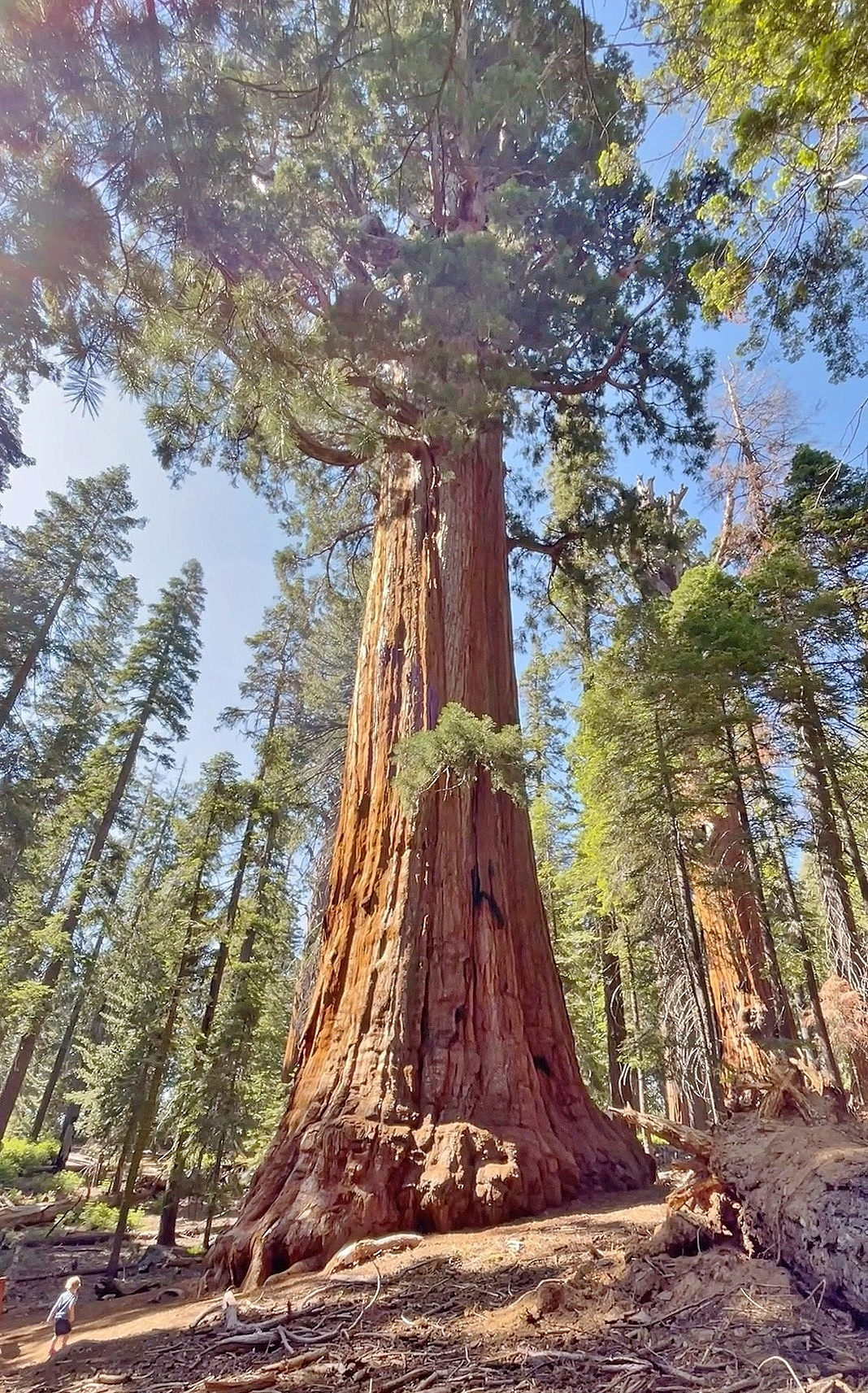
The President (Sequoia National Park)

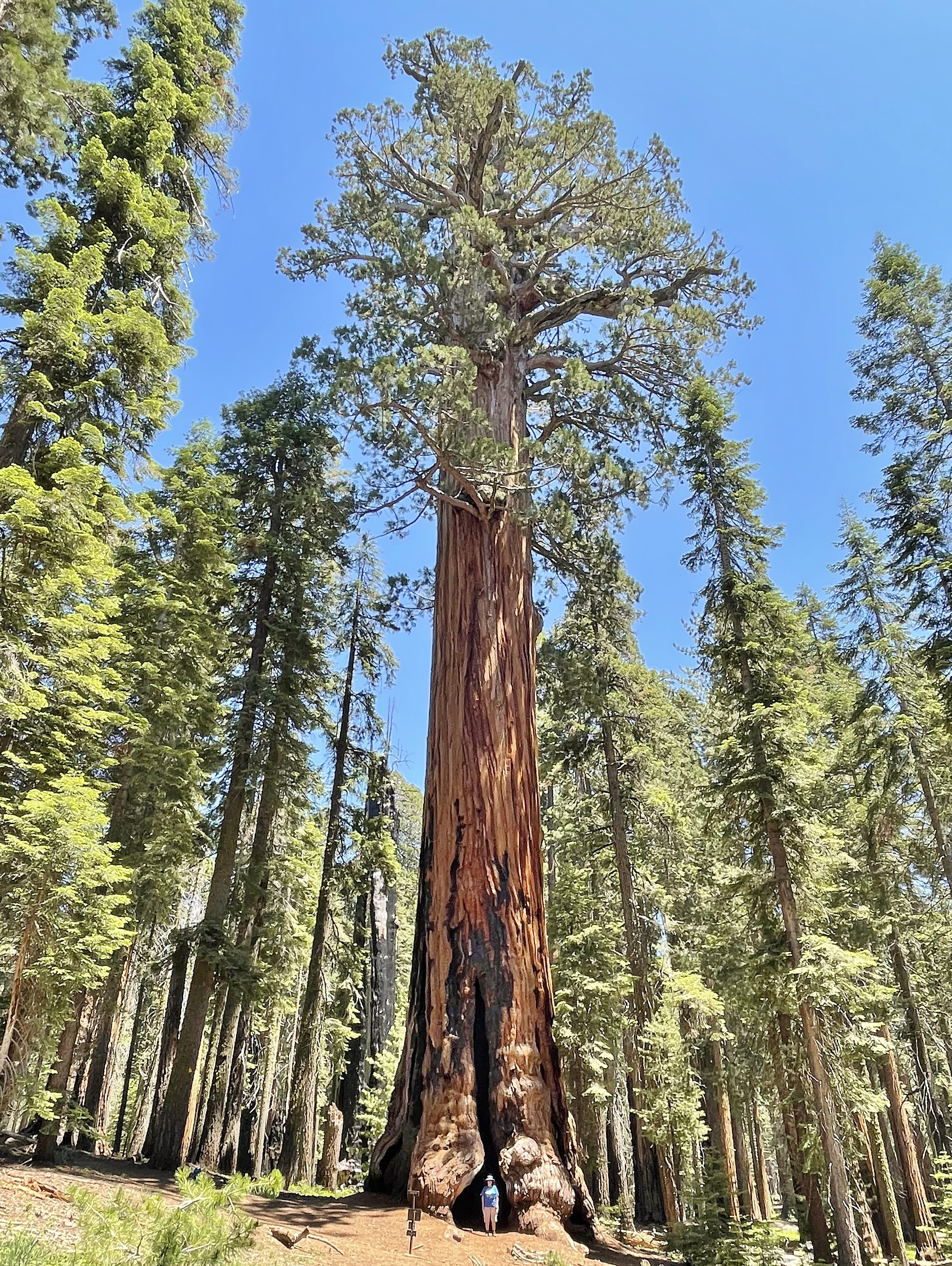
Lincoln (Sequoia National Park)

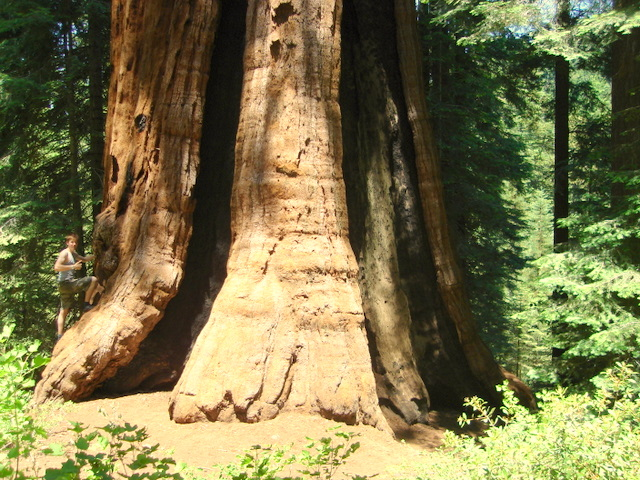
Base of Stagg

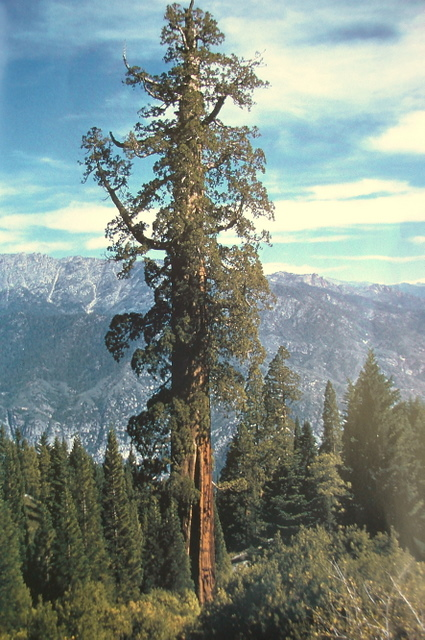
Boole

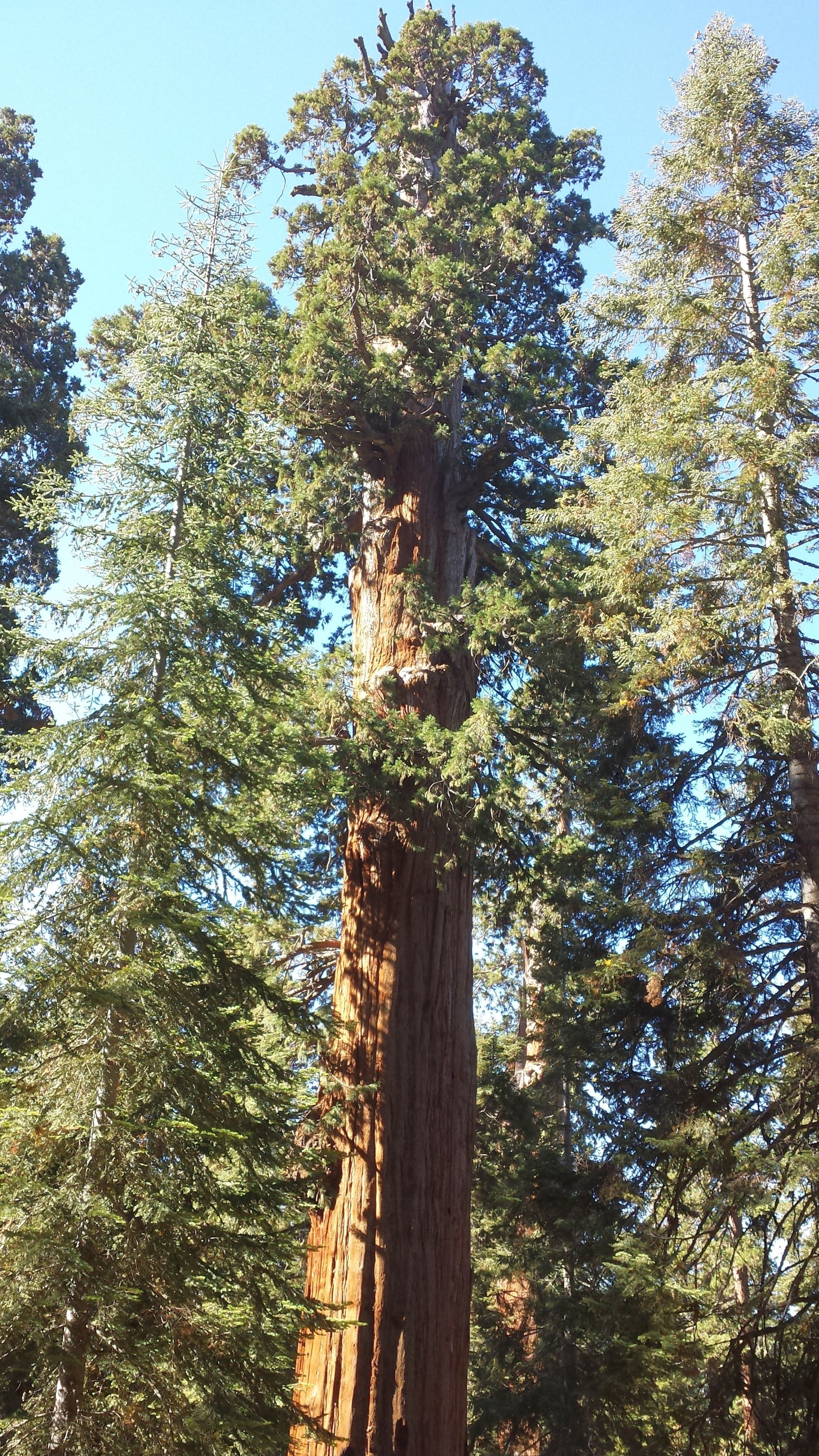
Genesis

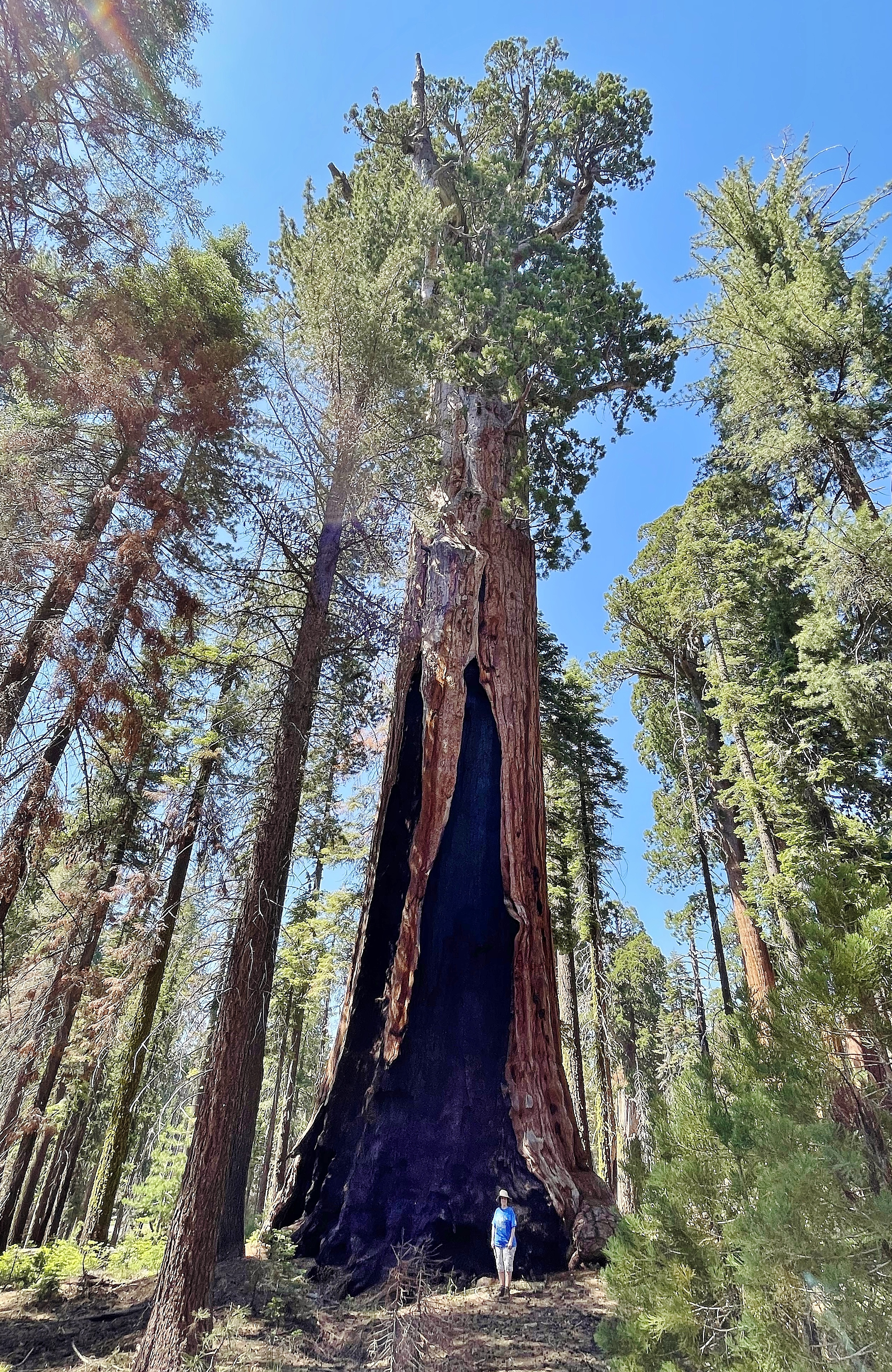
Franklin (Sequoia National Park)

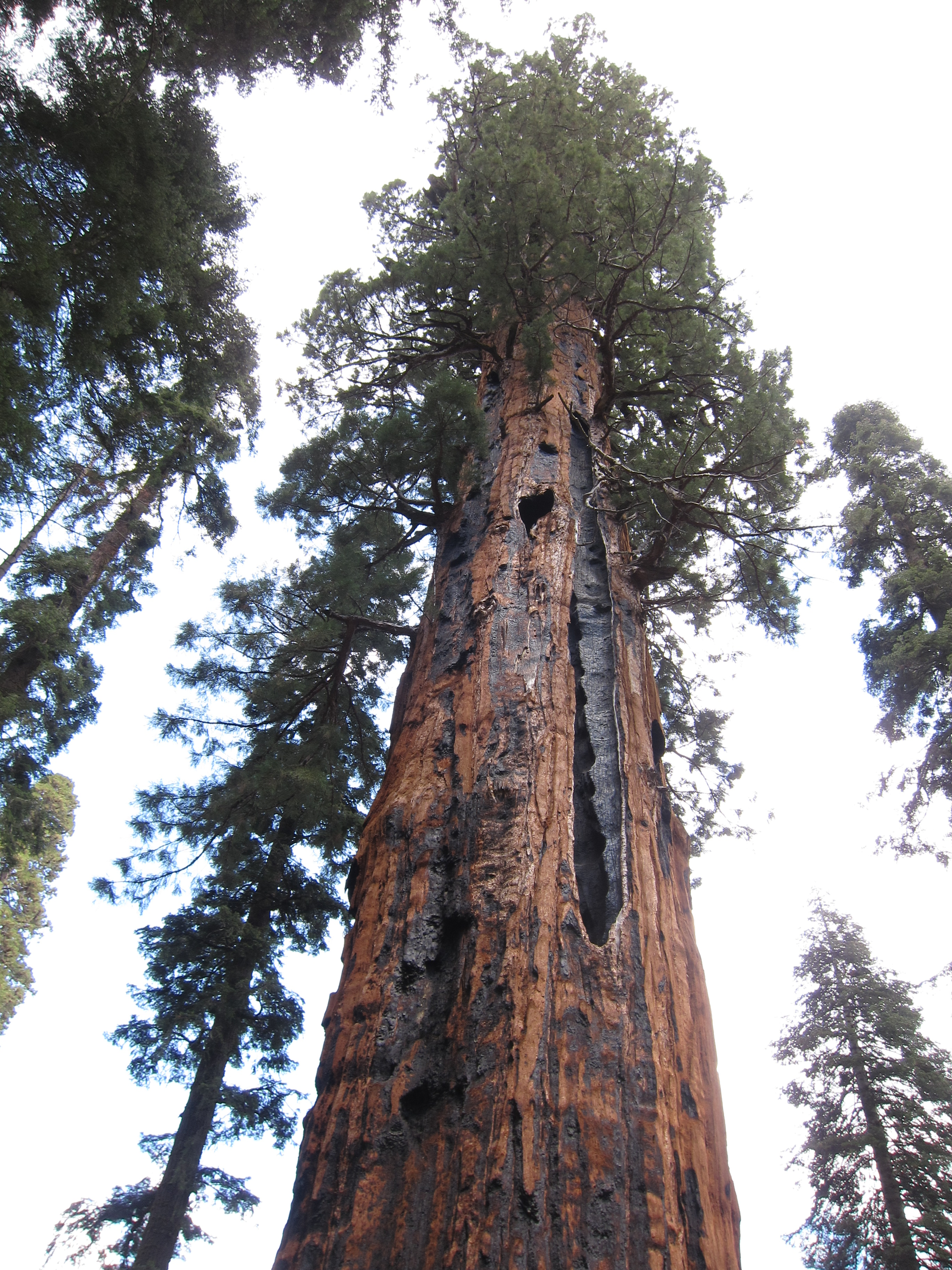
King Arthur

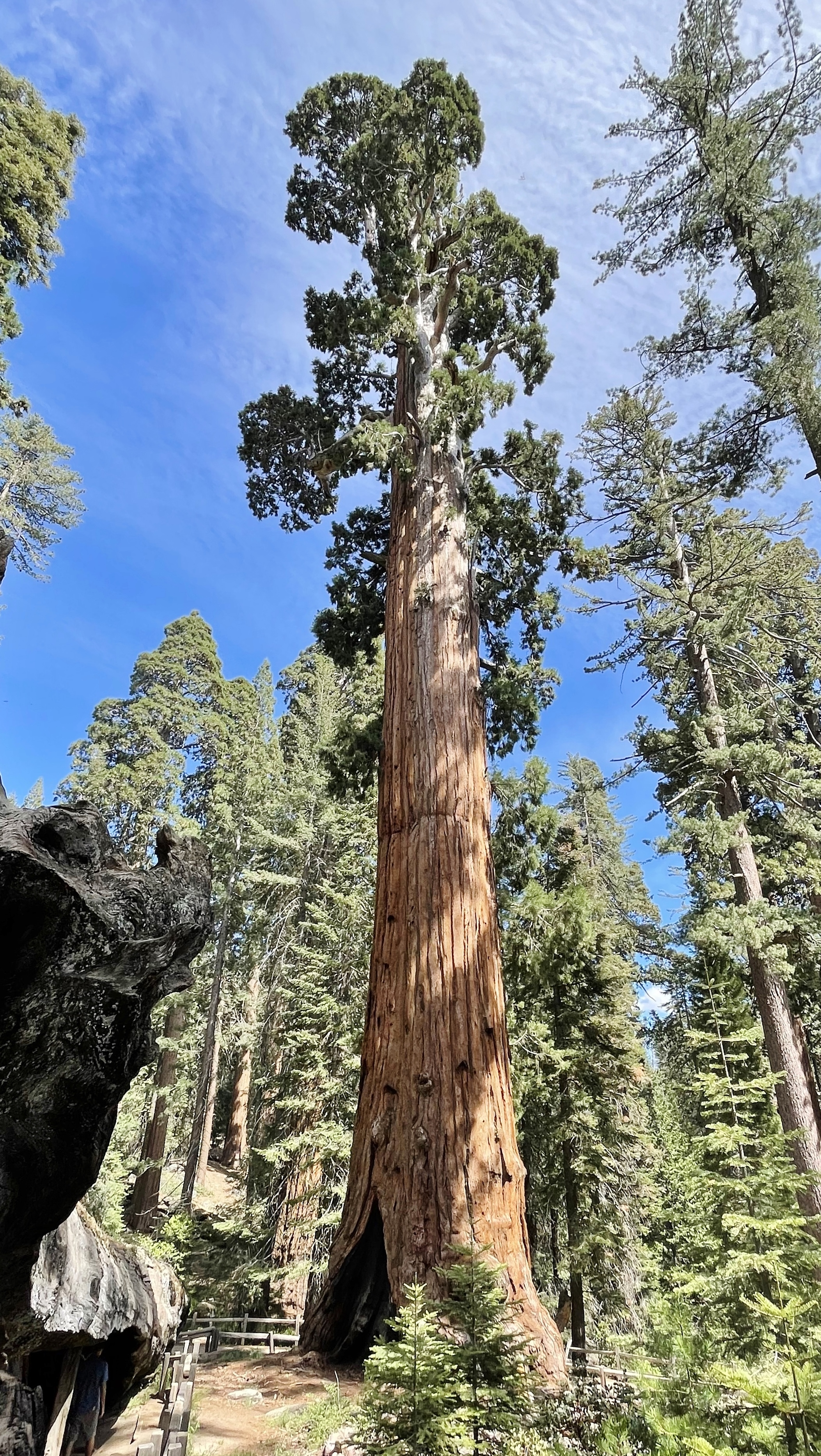
11th largest giant sequoia by trunk volume

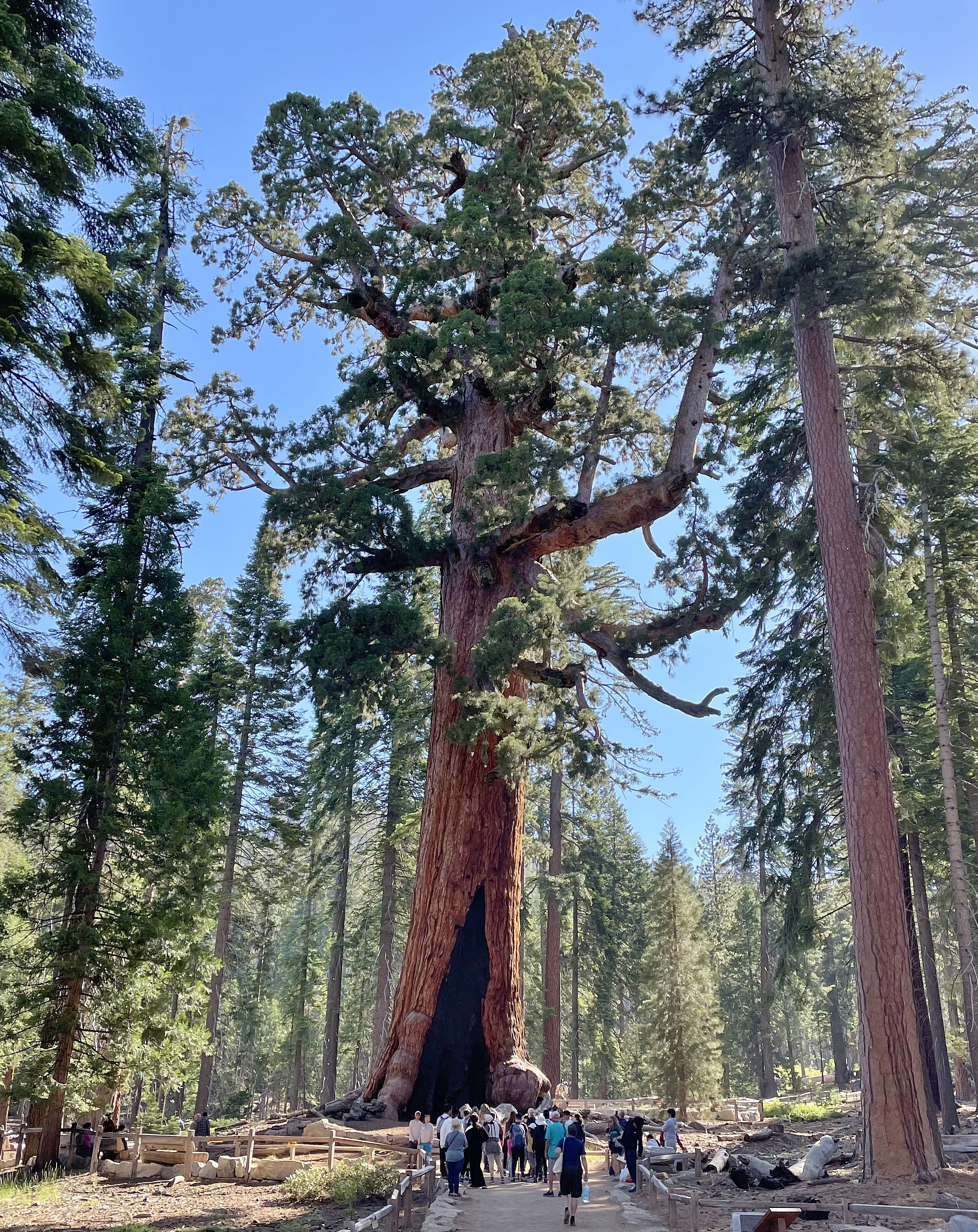
Grizzly Giant (Yosemite National Park)

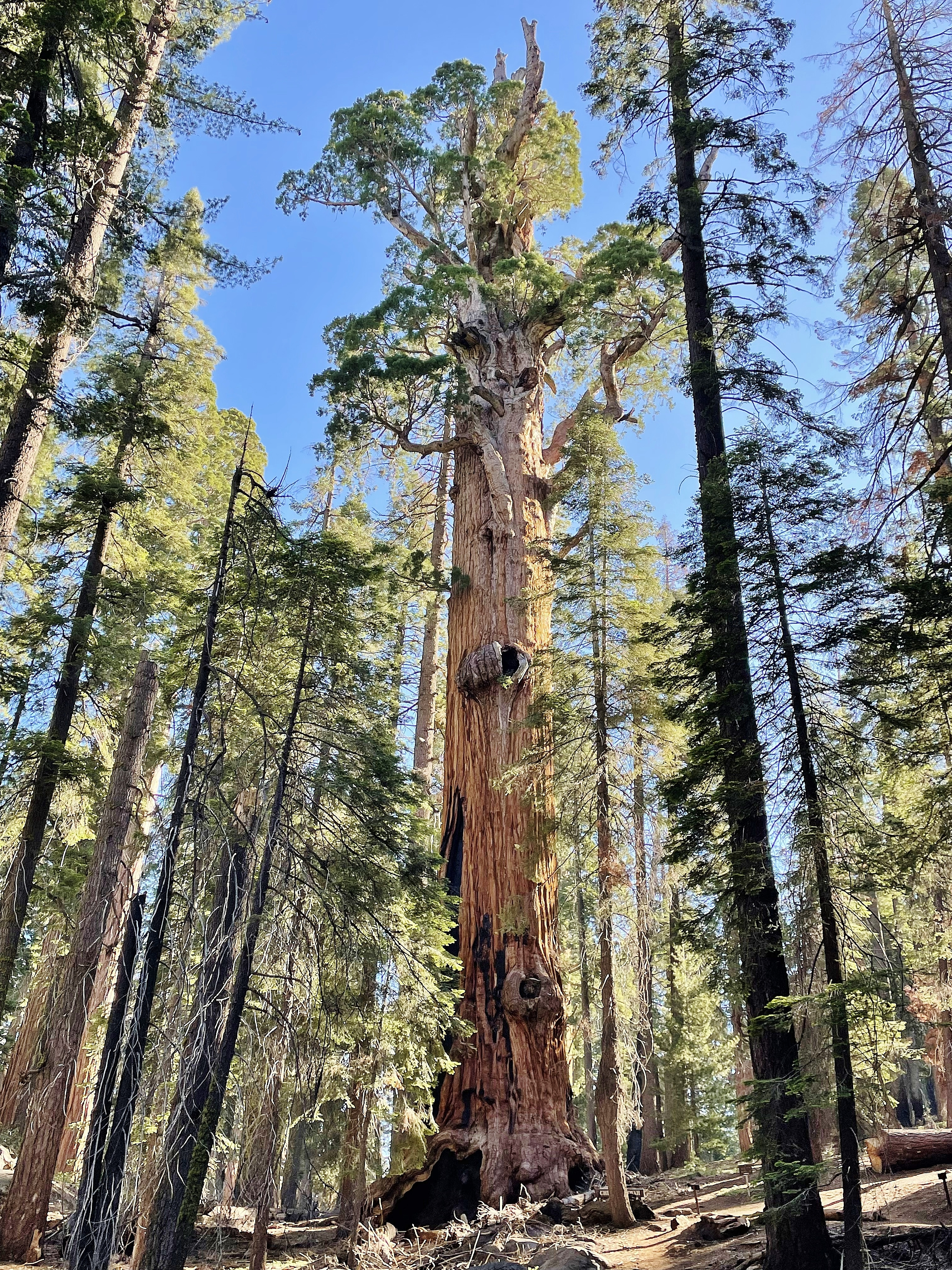
Chief Sequoyah

== See also ==
- General Noble Tree
- List of giant sequoia groves
- Mother of the Forest
- National Register of Big Trees
- List of individual trees
- List of oldest trees
- List of superlative trees
- The House (trees)
