= Nelder =

Nelder can refer to:

- Geoff Nelder, a British author
- John Nelder (1924-2010), a British statistician
- Nelder, a giant sequoia in California
- Nelder Grove, a giant sequoia grove in California
- Nelder–Mead method, a method to find the minimum or maximum of an objective function in a multidimensional space
