= Nelder Tree =

Giant sequoia tree in Nelder Grove, California

Coordinates: 37°26′29″N 119°35′47″W

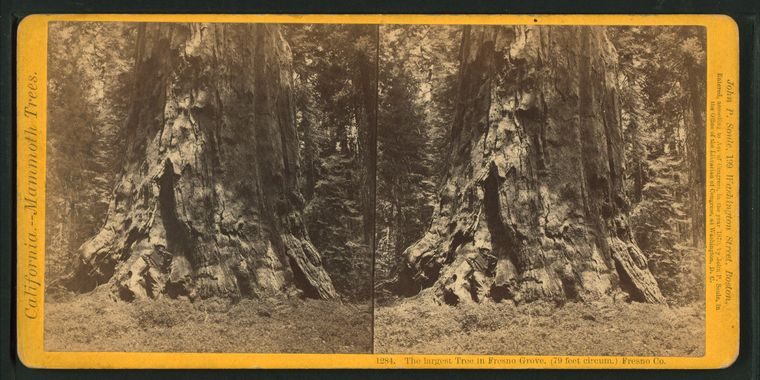
Nelder Tree (Photograph by John P. Soule, 1870)

The Nelder Tree is a giant sequoia located within the Nelder Grove of Sequoia National Forest in California. It is the largest tree in Nelder Grove, the 23rd largest giant sequoia in the world, and could be considered the 22nd largest depending on how badly Ishi Giant atrophied during the Rough Fire in 2015.

== Description ==
The Nelder Tree is located 1,050 ft (320 m) northwest of a hairpin turn along "Graveyard of the Giants Trail" at the end of an unofficial branching trail. The base of the tree, much like the surrounding trees, was charred during the 2017 Railroad Fire.

== History ==
On July 3, 1859, naturalist Galen Clark, Judge John W. Fitzhugh, and journalist L.A. Holmes discovered the tree while on a hunting expedition in the area. In 1875, prospector-turned-hermit John A. Nelder built a cabin near the tree, which he considered to be the largest in the world. Nelder met naturalist John Muir later that same year, but when Muir measured the tree, he determined it to be smaller than the Grizzly Giant tree of Mariposa Grove. Nelder's tree, though narrower, was later found to be taller and more voluminous than the Grizzly Giant, making it the second largest giant sequoia in the region after the Washington tree of Mariposa Grove.

== Dimensions ==
Height above base	266.2 ft	81.1 m
Circumference at ground	90 ft	27.4 m
Estimated bole volume	34,993 ft^{3}	991 m^{3}

== See also ==
- List of largest giant sequoias
- List of individual trees
