= Franklin Tree =

Giant sequoia in Giant Forest, California

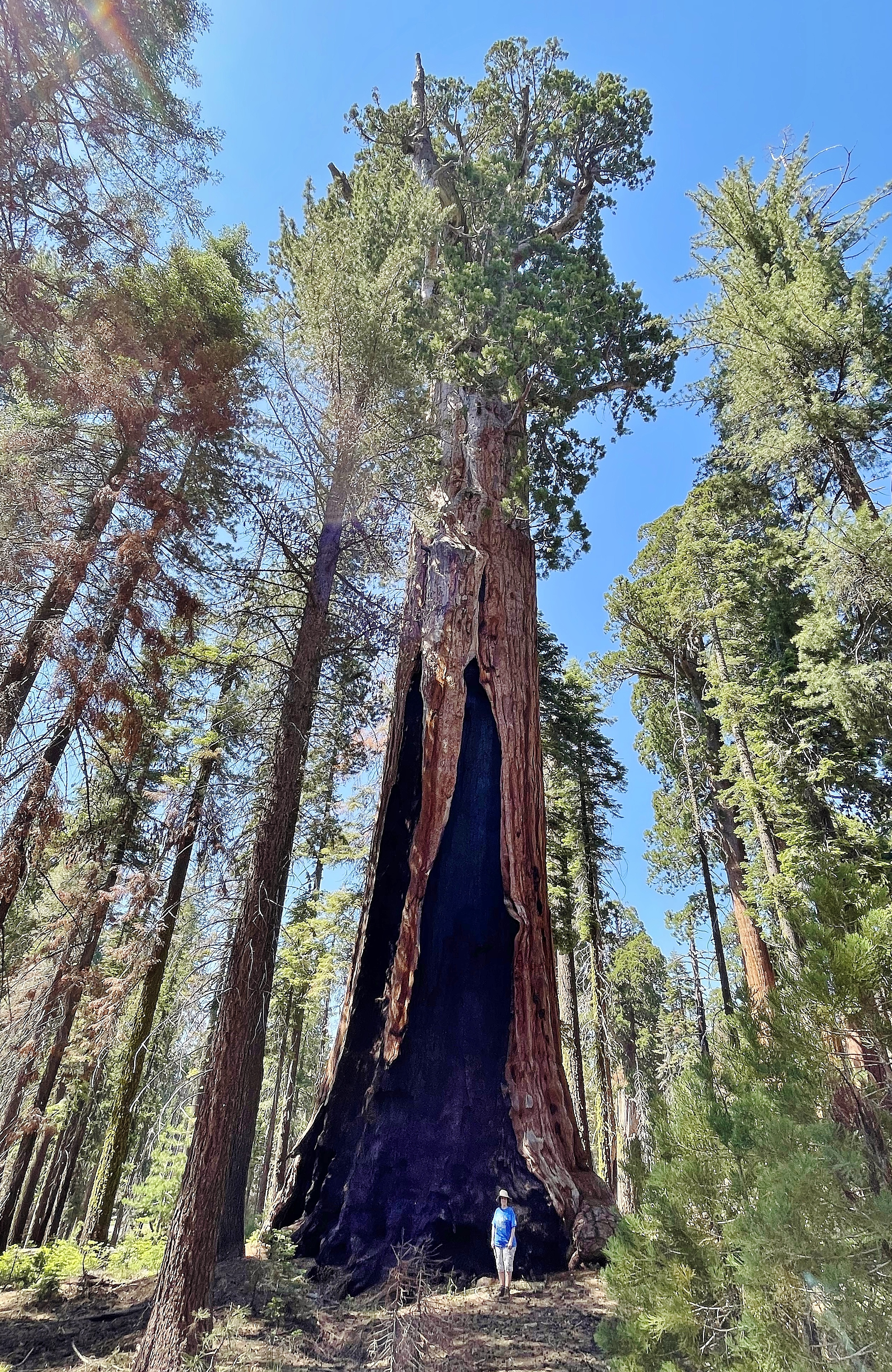
Franklin Tree, distance (July 2023)

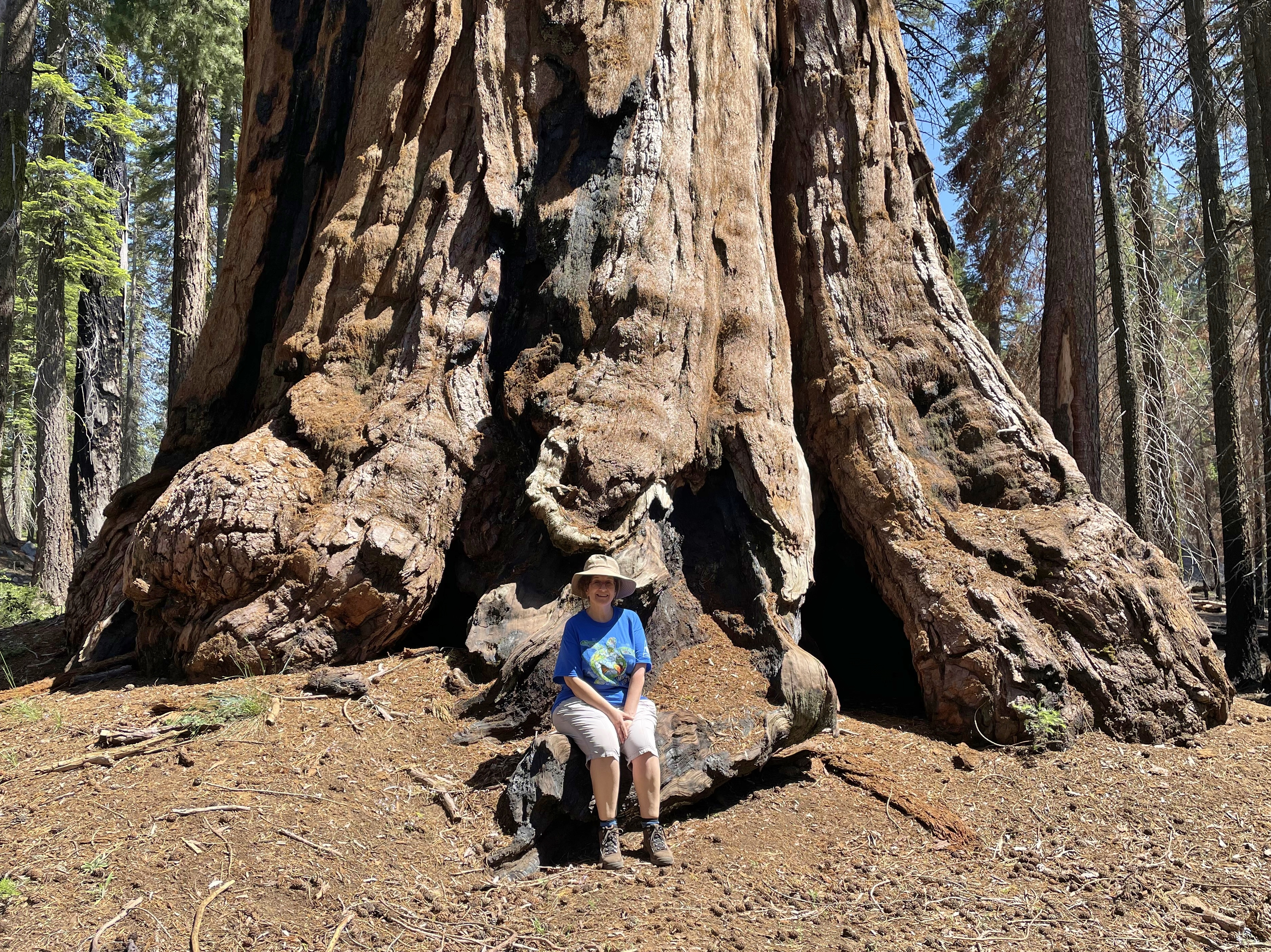
Franklin Tree, close up (July 2023)

The Franklin Tree is a giant sequoia in Giant Forest, a sequoia grove where the largest tree in the world lives – the General Sherman Tree. The Franklin Tree is the eighth largest giant sequoia in the world. It was named by Wendell Flint after Founding Father Benjamin Franklin. Nearby trees include the Washington Tree which was once the second largest tree in the world, but since it lost half its trunk in 2005 many sequoias are now larger.

Giant Forest, famed for its giant sequoia trees, is within Sequoia National Park. The forest, at over 6,000 feet (1,800 m) in elevation, is located in the western Sierra Nevada of California. Four out of the ten largest trees by volume on the planet are said to be within the Giant Forest. The largest, the General Sherman Tree, measures 36.5 feet (11.1 m) across the base.

== Dimensions ==
	Meters	Feet
Height above base	68.2	223.8
Circumference at ground	28.9	94.8
Diameter 1.5 m above base	6.7	21.9
Estimated bole volume (m^{3}.ft^{3})	1,169	41,280

== See also ==
- List of largest giant sequoias
- List of individual trees
