= Boole Tree =

Giant sequoia in California, United States

Coordinates: 36°49′26″N 118°56′57″W

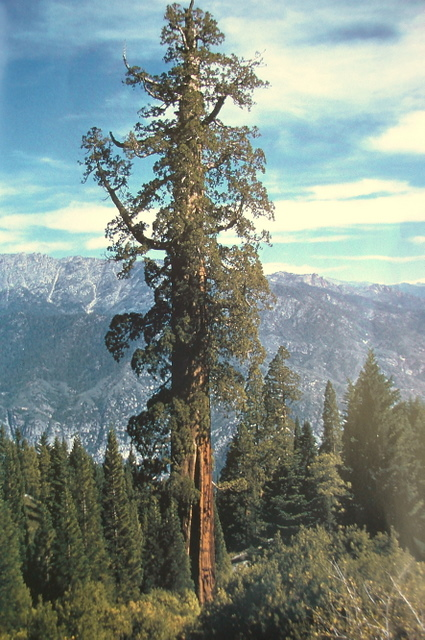
The Boole Tree – sixth largest tree in the world

The Boole Tree is a giant sequoia in Giant Sequoia National Monument, Fresno County, California. The Boole Tree is the eighth-tallest sequoia in the world and is the largest in terms of base circumference at 113 feet (34 m). It is estimated to be more than 2,000 years old. The tree's stature is accentuated by its isolation above the Kings River where it towers over the rest of the forest.

The Boole Tree is the largest in the Converse Basin Grove, which is 5 miles (8 km) from the General Grant Grove in Kings Canyon National Park. Converse Basin used to be a large grove, but was logged of most of its giant sequoias between 1892 and 1918. Now only perhaps 60–100 large specimens survive out of thousands. However, this grove is still the second-largest contiguous grove in the world.

== Namesake ==
The tree is named for Frank Boole, general manager of the Sanger Lumber Company, which logged Converse Basin. Boole is thought to have ordered the tree spared during the logging of the grove. The name was in use by 1902; in correspondence that year, John Muir noted that he had seen and measured the same tree in 1877, when it was known as the "Hugh Miller."

== Description ==
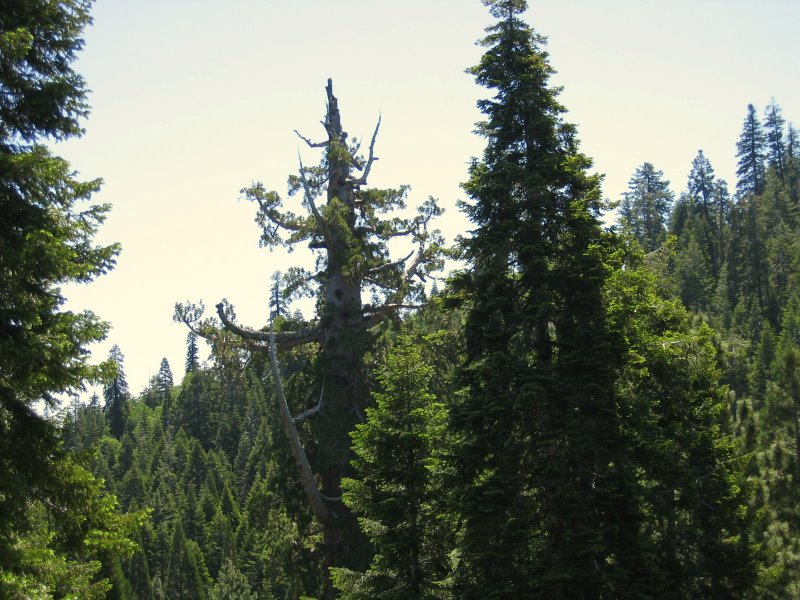
The Boole Tree, top branches mostly dead

The Boole Tree was once thought to be the largest tree in the world, but it is now known to be the sixth largest, with five other giant sequoias surpassing it in size: the General Sherman, General Grant, The President, Lincoln, and Stagg trees. Despite this, Boole is still the largest in terms of circumference, with a base measuring 113 ft (34 m).

Located among shorter Scouler willows that have grown in the area following logging, the tree stands out at a height of 268 feet (82 m). It is likely growing faster due to a lack of competition in its modified environment, and its survival may also be attributed to the reduction of fuel in the area since logging ceased in the 1900s.

== Dimensions ==
Height above base	268.8 ft	81.9 m
Circumference at ground	113.0 ft	34.4 m
Diameter 4.5 ft (1.4 m) above highest point on ground	25.4 ft	7.7 m
Diameter 60 ft (18 m) above base	15.6 ft	4.8 m
Diameter 180 ft (55 m) above base	11.9 ft	3.6 m
Estimated bole volume	43,931 ft^{3}	1,244 m^{3}

== See also ==
- Big Lonely Doug – a large Douglas fir whose immediate surroundings were also clearcut
- List of largest giant sequoias
- List of oldest trees
- List of individual trees
- Sequoia National Forest−related topics
