= Hazelwood Tree =

Giant sequoia tree in Sequoia National Park, California, United States

Coordinates: 36°33′33″N 118°45′59″W

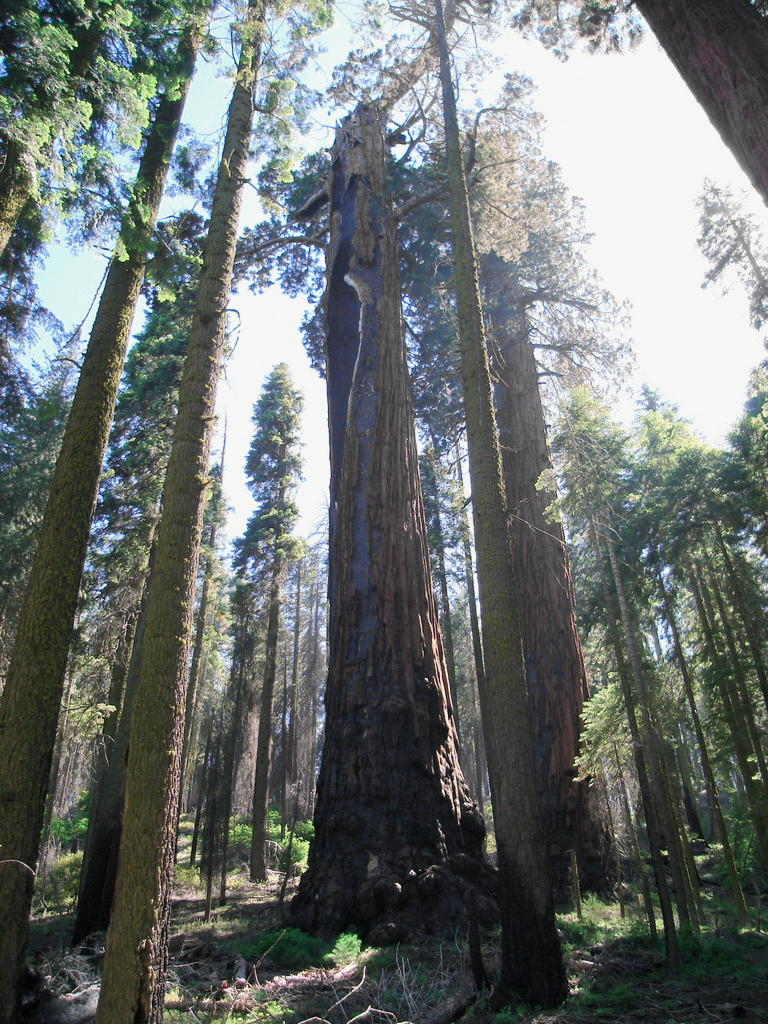
The Hazelwood Tree

The Hazelwood Tree is a giant sequoia in the Giant Forest, the sequoia grove where the largest living tree in the world, named General Sherman, grows. It is located on a hillside just west of the Hazelwood Nature Trail. The tree had a volume of 36,228 cu ft (1,025.9 m^{3}) and was the 17th largest giant sequoia, before losing half its trunk in a lightning storm in 2002. The tree was measured in 1989.

== See also ==
- List of largest giant sequoias
- List of individual trees
