= Robert E. Lee Tree =

Coordinates: 36.7480°N 118.9711°W

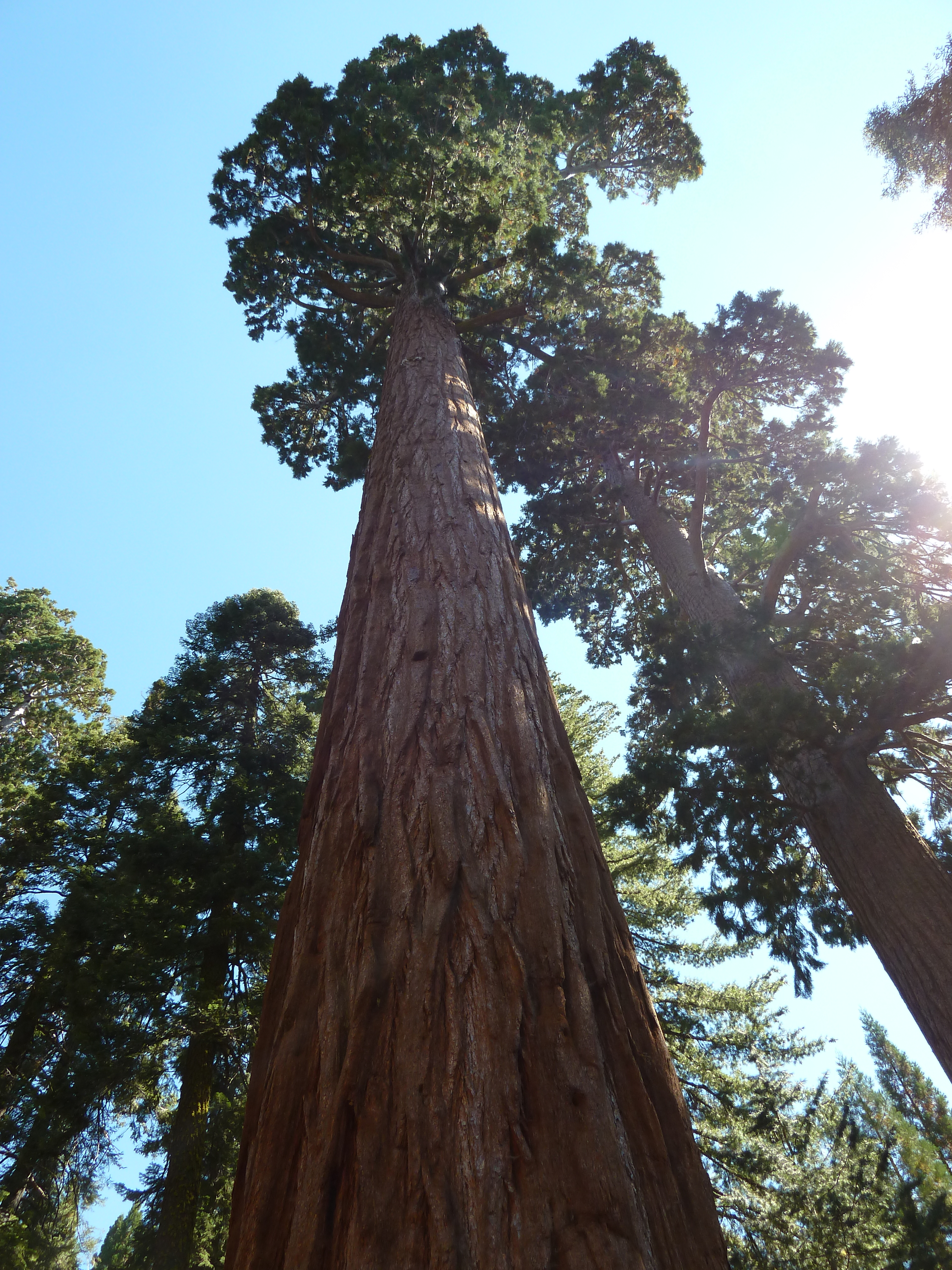
Robert E. Lee Tree, the 11th largest giant sequoia tree in the world.

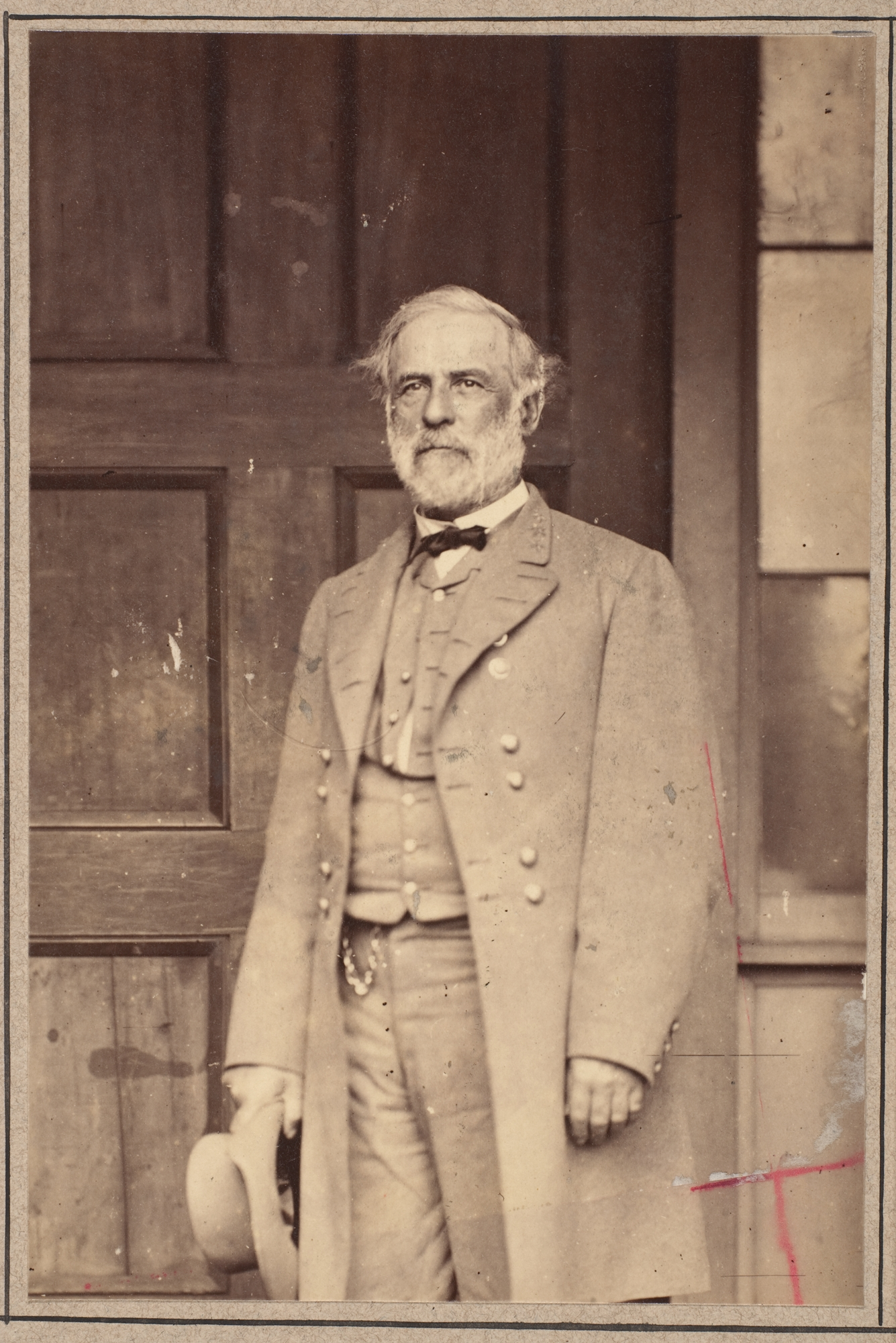
Robert E. Lee

The Robert E. Lee Tree is the second largest giant sequoia in the Grant Grove section of Kings Canyon National Park, and the eleventh largest giant sequoia in the world. Richard Field, a Confederate lieutenant, named this tree in honor of Robert E. Lee around 1875. In 2020, Sequoia and Kings Canyon National Parks removed references to the name in Park materials, in an effort to promote inclusiveness following the George Floyd protests; however, the name cannot be changed without the approval of Congress or the National Park Service.

== Dimensions ==
Wendell Flint and Mike Law measured the tree in 1985 and found its volume to be 40,102 cubic feet (1,135.6 m^{3}).

| | Metres | Feet |
| Height above base | 77.6 m | 254.7 |
| Circumference at ground | 26.9 m | 88.3 |
| Diameter 1.5 m above base | 7.3 m | 23.8 |
| Estimated bole volume (m^{3}/ft^{3}) | 1,135.6 m^{3} | 40,102.0 |

== See also ==
- List of largest giant sequoias
- List of individual trees
