= John Adams Tree =

Coordinates: 36°34′12″N 118°45′15″W

The John Adams Tree, also known as just Adams, is a giant sequoia located within the Giant Forest Grove of Sequoia National Park, California. The tree was named after Founding Father John Adams, the 2nd president of the United States. The tree is the thirteenth largest giant sequoia in the world.

== Description ==
The trunk of the Adams Tree features a large triangular burn scar on its north face.

== Dimensions ==
Height above base	250.6 ft	76.4 m
Circumference at ground	83.3 ft	25.4 m
Estimated bole volume	38,956 cu ft	1,103 m^{3}

== See also ==
- List of largest giant sequoias
- List of individual trees
