= Lincoln Tree =

Coordinates: 36°34′19″N 118°45′22″W

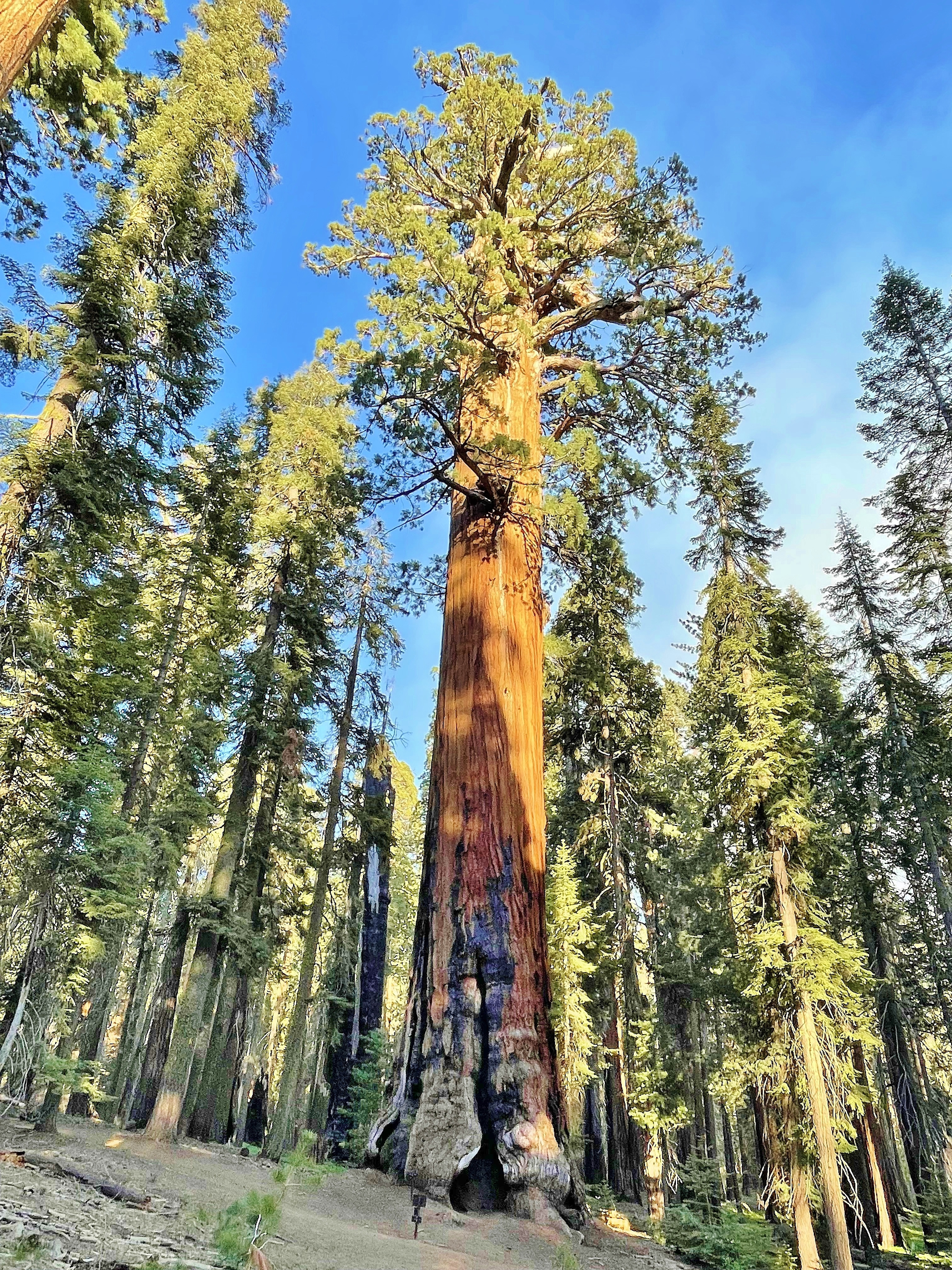
Lincoln tree in Sequoia National Park, the 4th largest tree in the world (June 2022).

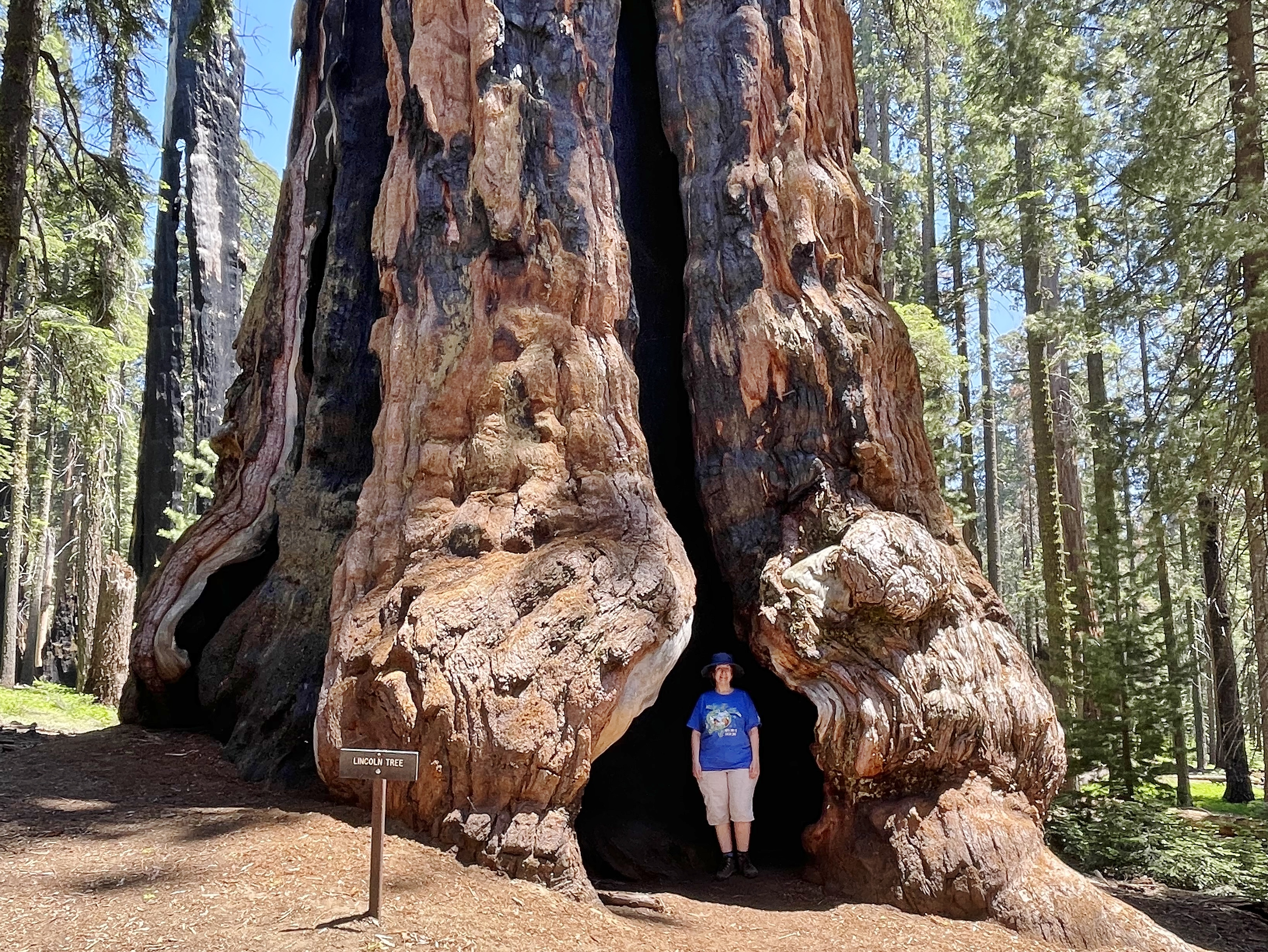
Base of Lincoln Tree (July 2023)

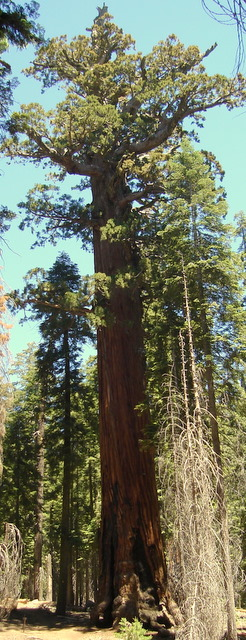
Lincoln Tree (July 2007)

The Lincoln Tree is a huge giant sequoia located in Giant Forest in Sequoia National Park. It is currently considered by many to be the fourth largest tree in the world.

== Description ==
The Lincoln Tree features an irregular base with prominent burn scars on its northern, southern, and western faces. A small white burl can be seen on its northeastern face. The top of the tree appears bleached with many large branches pointing outward.

== Dimensions ==
Wendell Flint stated that the Lincoln Tree has a volume of 44,471 cubic feet (1,259.3 m^{3}). However, White and Pusateri indicated that the volume of the Lincoln Tree based on measurements made in the 1930s is 51,000 cubic feet (1,400 m^{3}), which would make the Lincoln Tree the second largest tree in the world, after the General Sherman Tree. Wendell Flint was somewhat critical of the earlier measurements and he stated that he thought that it was appropriate to exclude a portion of the irregular base of the tree from his volume calculations, which in addition to some extrapolation differences from the earlier measurements, explains the smaller volume of 44,471 cubic feet (1,259.3 m^{3}) that he obtained compared to the earlier figure. Although he chose to exclude it, Flint stated that the excluded portion of the base could just as easily be included in the calculations, presumably leading to the alternative volume of 51,000 cubic feet (1,400 m^{3}) The Lincoln Tree has a maximum base diameter of 36.4 feet.

	Metres	Feet
Height above base	80.0	256.1
Circumference at ground	30.1	98.5
Diameter 1.5 m above base	7.5	24.6
Estimated bole volume (m^{3}.ft^{3})	1,259.0	44,471.0

== See also ==
- List of largest giant sequoias
- List of individual trees
