= Mountain Home Demonstration State Forest =

State forest in California

- Interactive map of Mountain Home Demonstration State Forest
- Location: Tulare County, California
- Nearest city: Springville, California
- Coordinates: 36°13′51″N 118°42′46″W
- Area: 4,807 acres (19 km^{2})
- Established: 1946
- Governing body: CalFire

Mountain Home Demonstration State Forest (MHDSF) is a state forest located on Bear Creek Road (Tulare County Route 220), 28 km (17 mi) northeast of Springville in Tulare County, California. The protected land covers an area of 4,807 acres (19 km^{2}) with an elevation range between 1,463 m (4,800 ft) and 2,377.5 m (7,800 ft). The forest is best known for its namesake giant sequoia grove, Mountain Home Grove, which is home to some of the largest giant sequoias in the world.

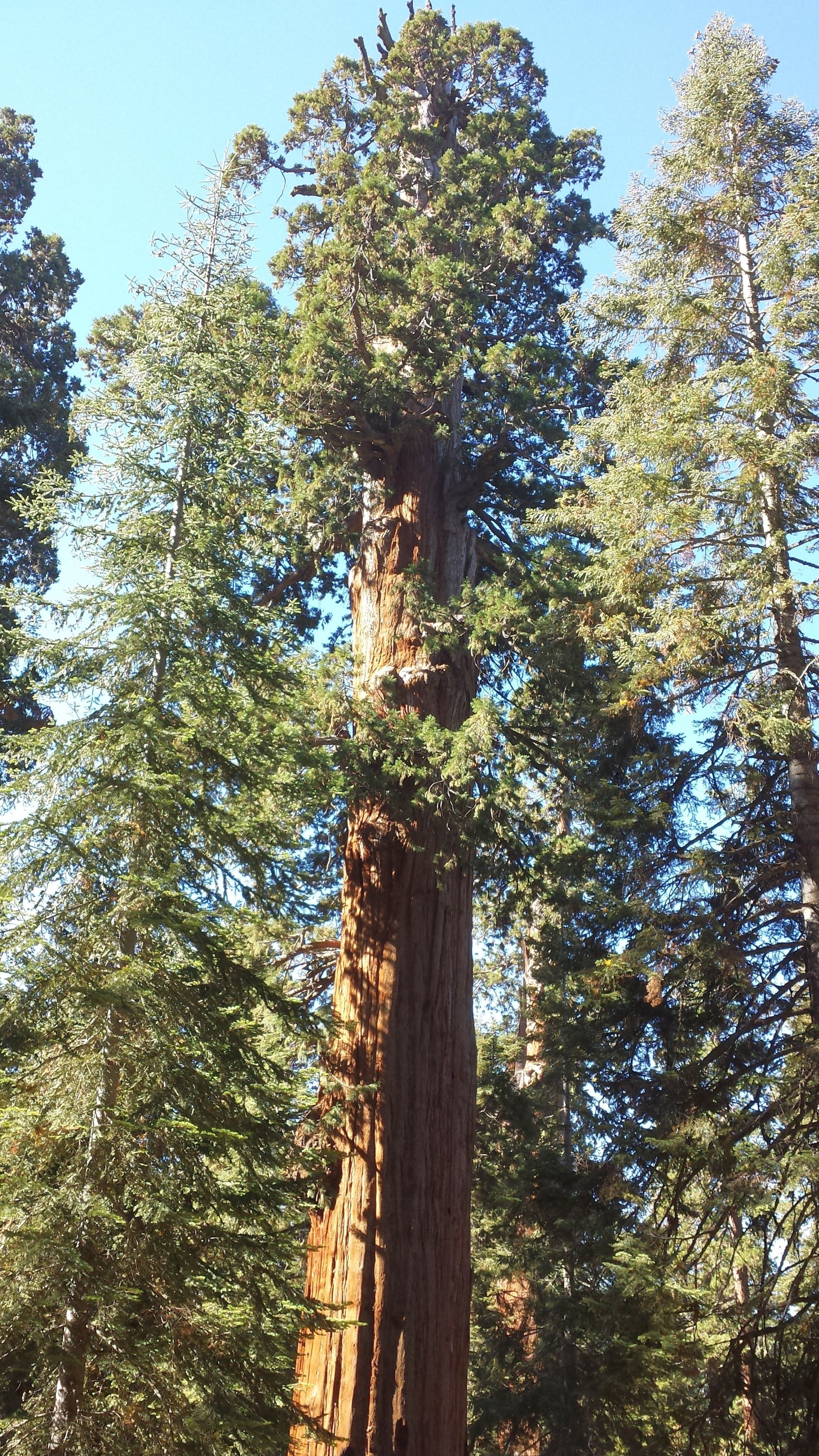
The Genesis Tree, the 7th largest giant sequoia in the world.

The forests of Mountain Home were used by local Native Americans in the summer to camp, hunt, and gather food. An interpretive exhibit at Sunset Point leads visitors through an archaeological site with evidence of occupation dating back 8,000 years.

European settlers first arrived in the Mountain Home area in the early 1860s. The local forestry industry boomed following the construction of the first sawmills. Sheep and other livestock were also brought to graze upon the many grassy meadows of the forest.

The forest was also a popular retreat for the people of Central Valley. Many small summer cabins were built and the forest saw about 600-700 annual visitors. In 1886, Andrew and Sarah Doty founded the small resort community of Mountain Home, drawing more visitors to the forest.

By the 1890s, the local forestry industry began to wane. In 1907, the Central California Redwood Company sold the largest tract of land to the Hume-Bennett Lumber Company. Shortly thereafter the Hume-Bennett Lumber Company declared bankruptcy and the land was once again up for sale. There were no takers and so the land lay commercially dormant and open to visitors without restriction.

In 1930, Donald Sutch bought the rights to log the forest deadfall of the land once owned by Hume-Bennett. Sutch worked the land until 1941, when efforts to sell the property began anew.

The Michigan Trust Company owned the property at the time. Jack Brattin, the company's executive who handled the property, had determined the land was no longer commercially viable to log, so he offered all 4,800 acres for sale to the U.S. Forest Service - only to be turned down. Undeterred, Brattin decided to create a compelling reason for a public agency to buy it. He authorized Dude Sutch and two commercial lumber companies to start felling live sequoia trees. This caused public outcry and forced the U.S. Forest Service and the State of California to negotiate the purchase of the land. The Native Sons and Daughters of the Golden West was especially outspoken about the need to preserve the giant sequoias of Mountain Home.

In 1946, the State of California purchased the land and established the Mountain Home Demonstration State Forest, the first California State Forest. It was also the first demonstration forest meant for scientific research and experimentation in sustainable forestry and the restoration of the local ecology.

== See also ==
- Balch Park
- List of giant sequoia groves
