= Washington Tree =

Giant sequoia tree in Sequoia National Park, California, United States

Coordinates: 36°34′6″N 118°45′39″W

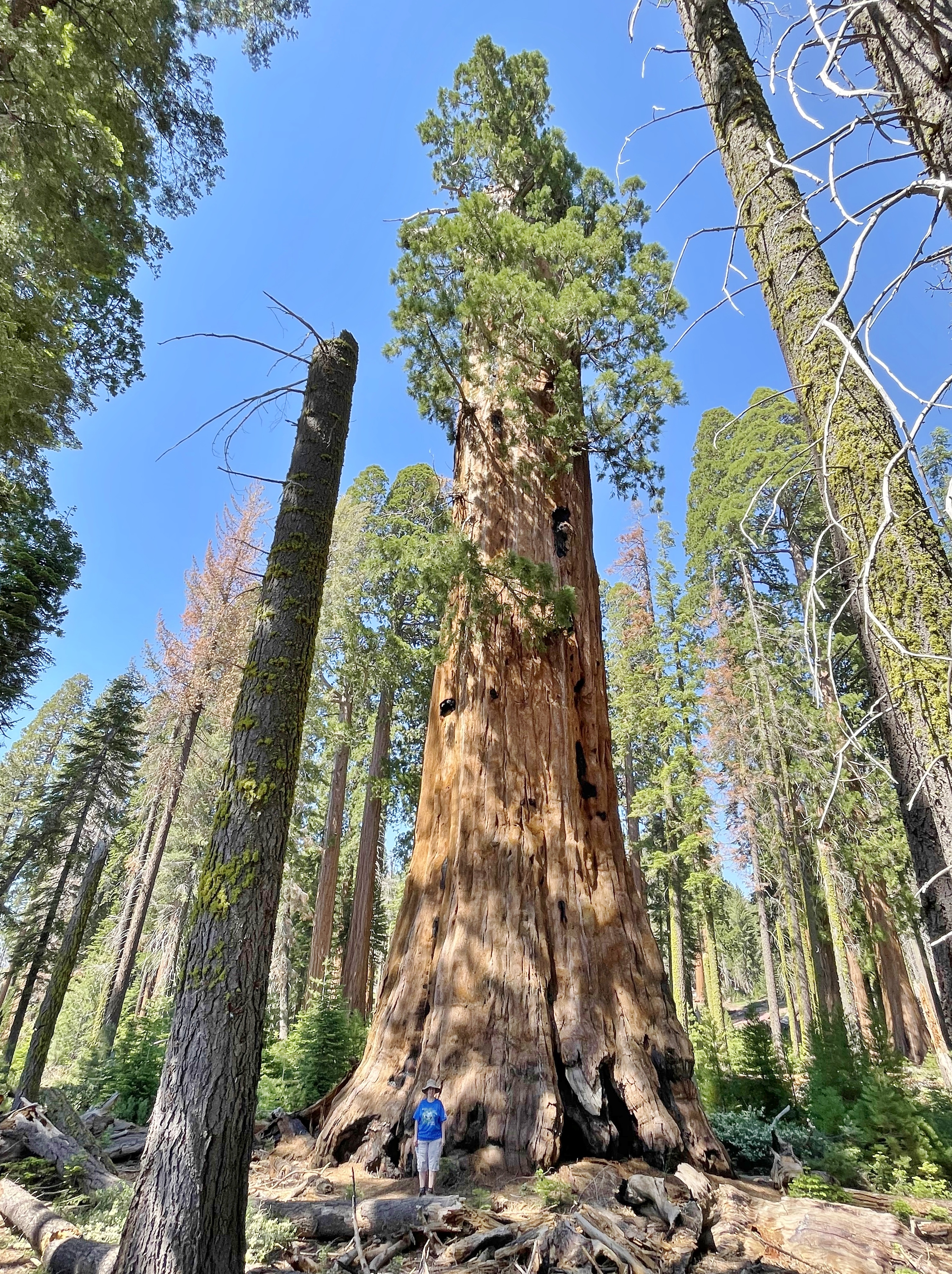
Healthy growth on one side of the Washington Tree (July 2023)

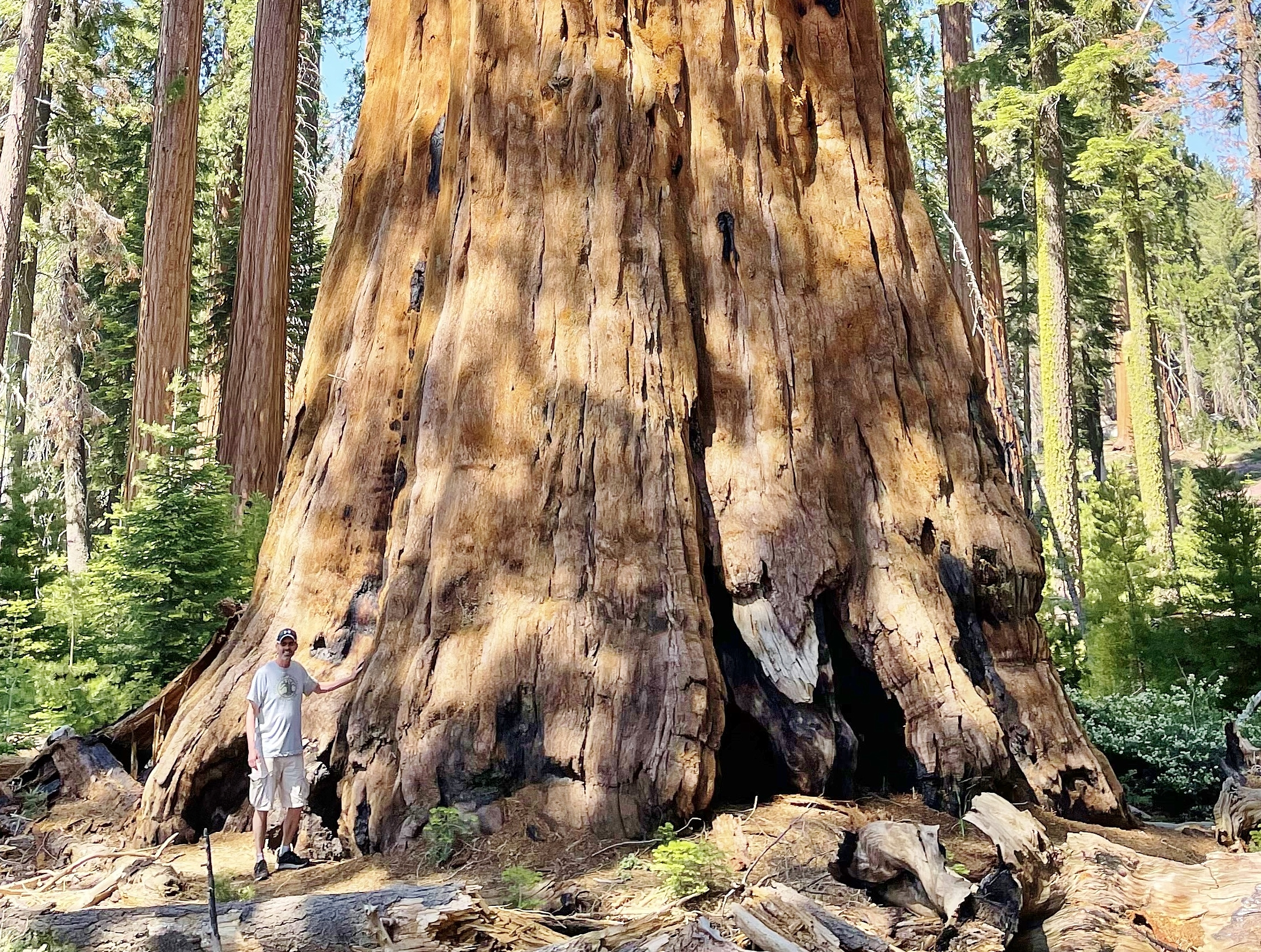
Close up of the Washington Tree (July 2023)

The Washington Tree is a giant sequoia in the Giant Forest Grove in Tulare County, California, within Sequoia National Park. It is named after Founding Father George Washington, the first President of the United States. Until it partially collapsed in January 2005, the Washington Tree was the second largest tree in the world (after the General Sherman Tree). Though badly damaged, the tree is still living.

== Before damage ==
The tree was studied in 1999 by scientists from Humboldt State University and University of Washington. The tree was 253.7 feet (77.3 m) tall, with a basal diameter of 29.9 feet (9.1 m). Its total volume was 49,550 cubic feet (1,403 m^{3}), including the main stem 47,930 cubic feet (1,357 m^{3}) and the 46 largest branches 1,620 cubic feet (46 m^{3}). The scientists discovered a large cavity in the trunk of the tree, measuring 115 feet (35 m) in height by 10 feet (3.0 m) in diameter. The cavity was accessible only by a hole situated 190 feet (58 m) above the ground. The significance of this finding is that the volume of wood in the tree had been greatly overestimated by previous measurements.

== Damage and collapse ==
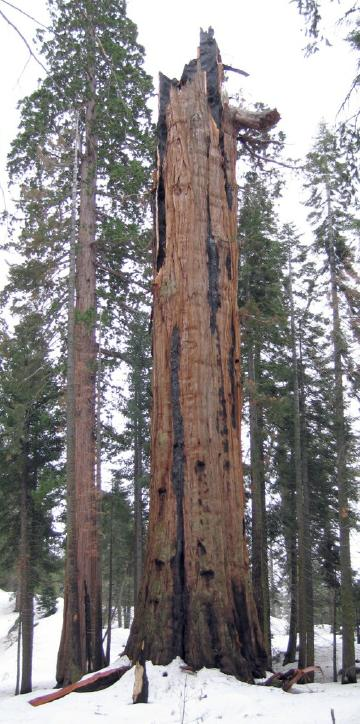
Bare side after partial collapse (February 2005)

In September 2003, a fire caused by a lightning strike damaged the tree's crown. National Park Service officials decided to let the fire burn without human intervention. The tree lost a large portion of its crown in the fire, reducing its height to about 229 feet (70 m).

The structurally weakened tree partially collapsed in January 2005, as the result of a heavy snow load in the remaining portion of its crown. The tree lost more than half its height, most of its branches, and much of the trunk, including the entire hollow upper portion of the trunk. It is now 115 feet (35 m) high, with only a few branches living near the top of the tree.

The Washington Tree is no longer one of the top ten largest giant sequoias, though the National Park Service still lists it as the second largest, due to current documentation policy (trees are calculated as if they did not suffer damage). Even in its damaged state, the tree may not be dying, as it still has half a dozen significant branches. Many other sequoias have survived with less foliage, and the tree might live decades or centuries longer.

== Regrowth ==
One side of the Washington Tree has been showing signs of regrowth since at least 2007.

== See also ==
- List of individual trees
- List of largest giant sequoias
