= The President (tree) =

Giant sequoia specimen

Coordinates: 36°34′24″N 118°45′00″W

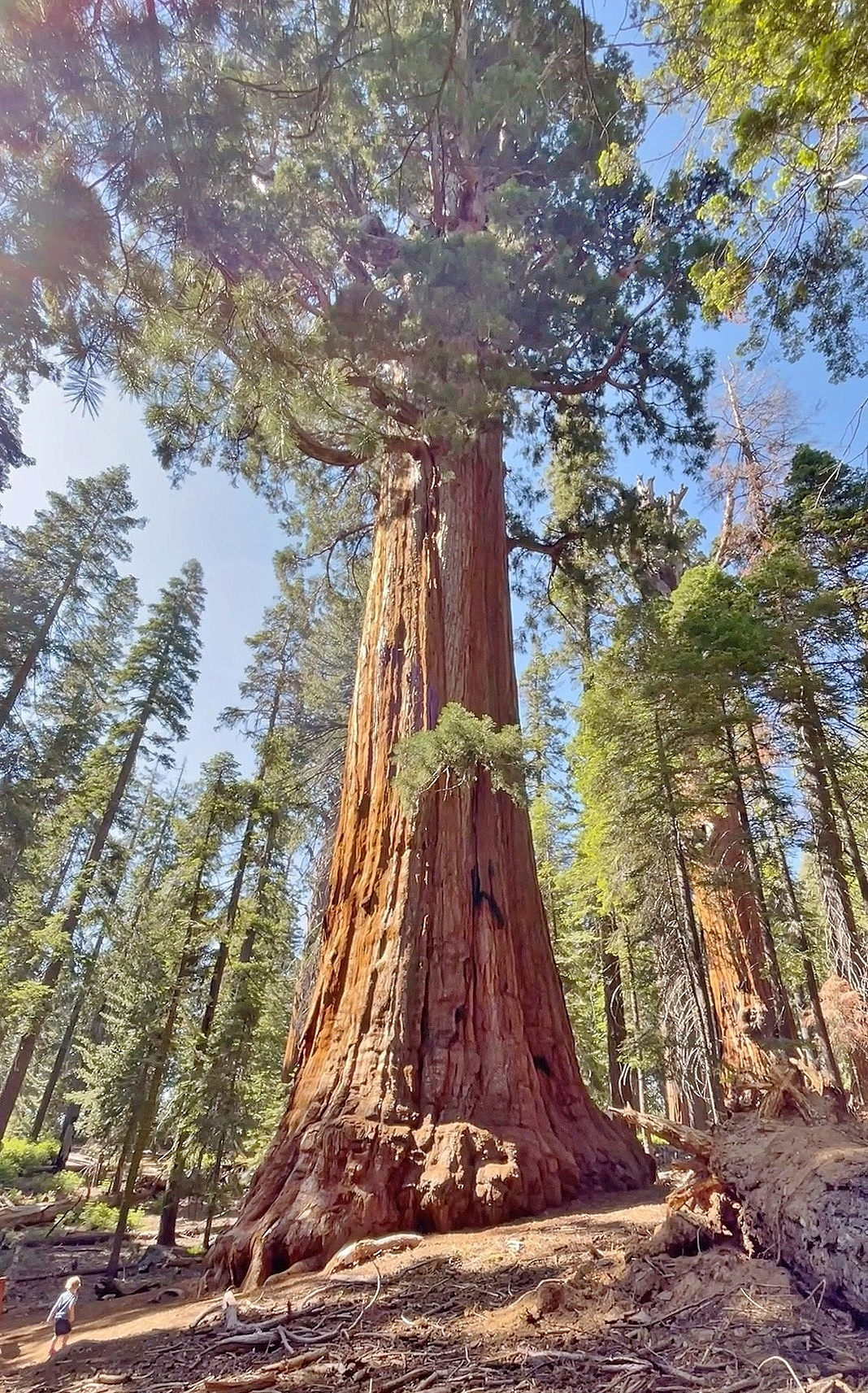
The President, July 2023

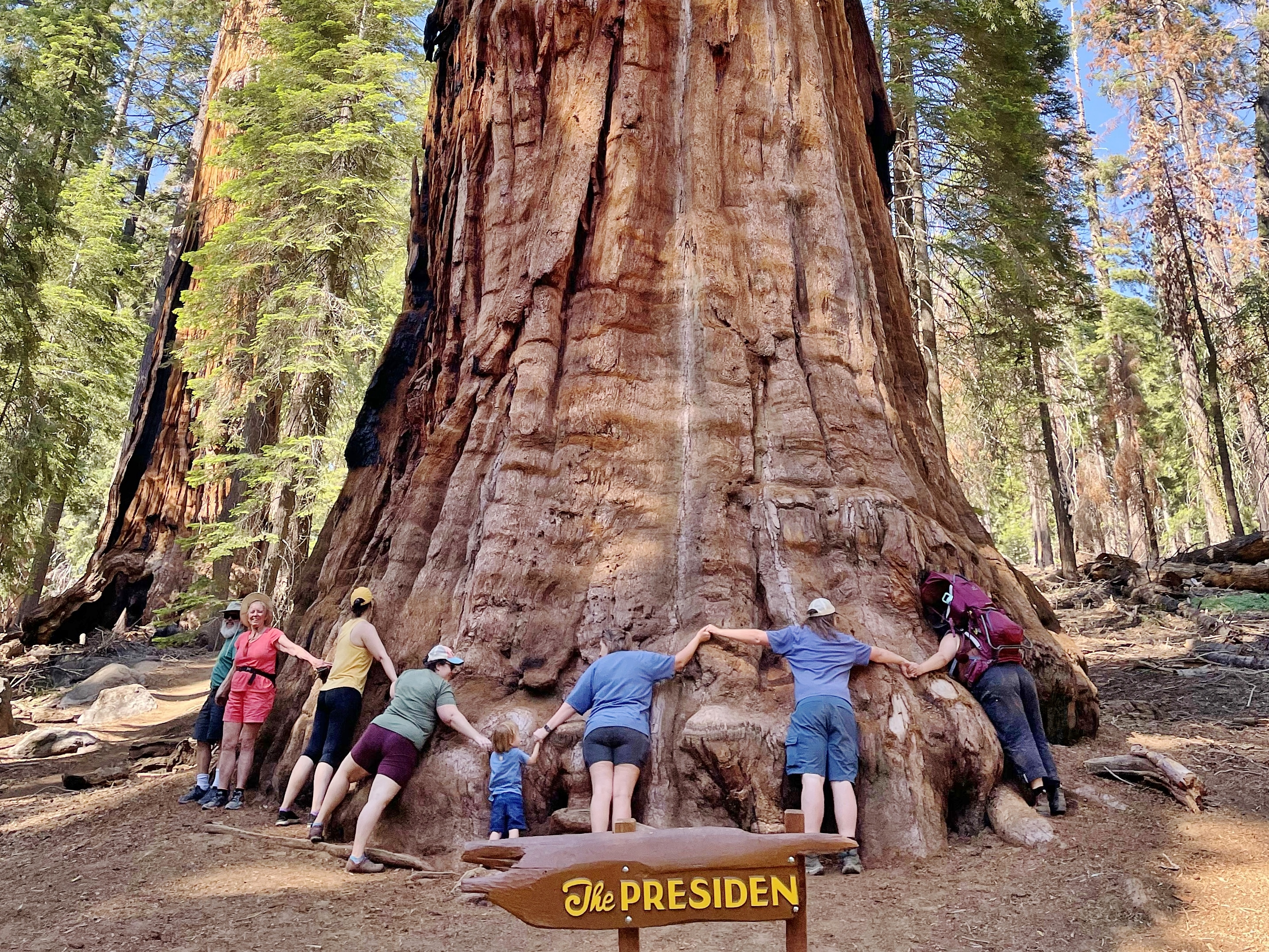
The President Tree, with humans surrounding it with interlocked hands for scale in July 2023

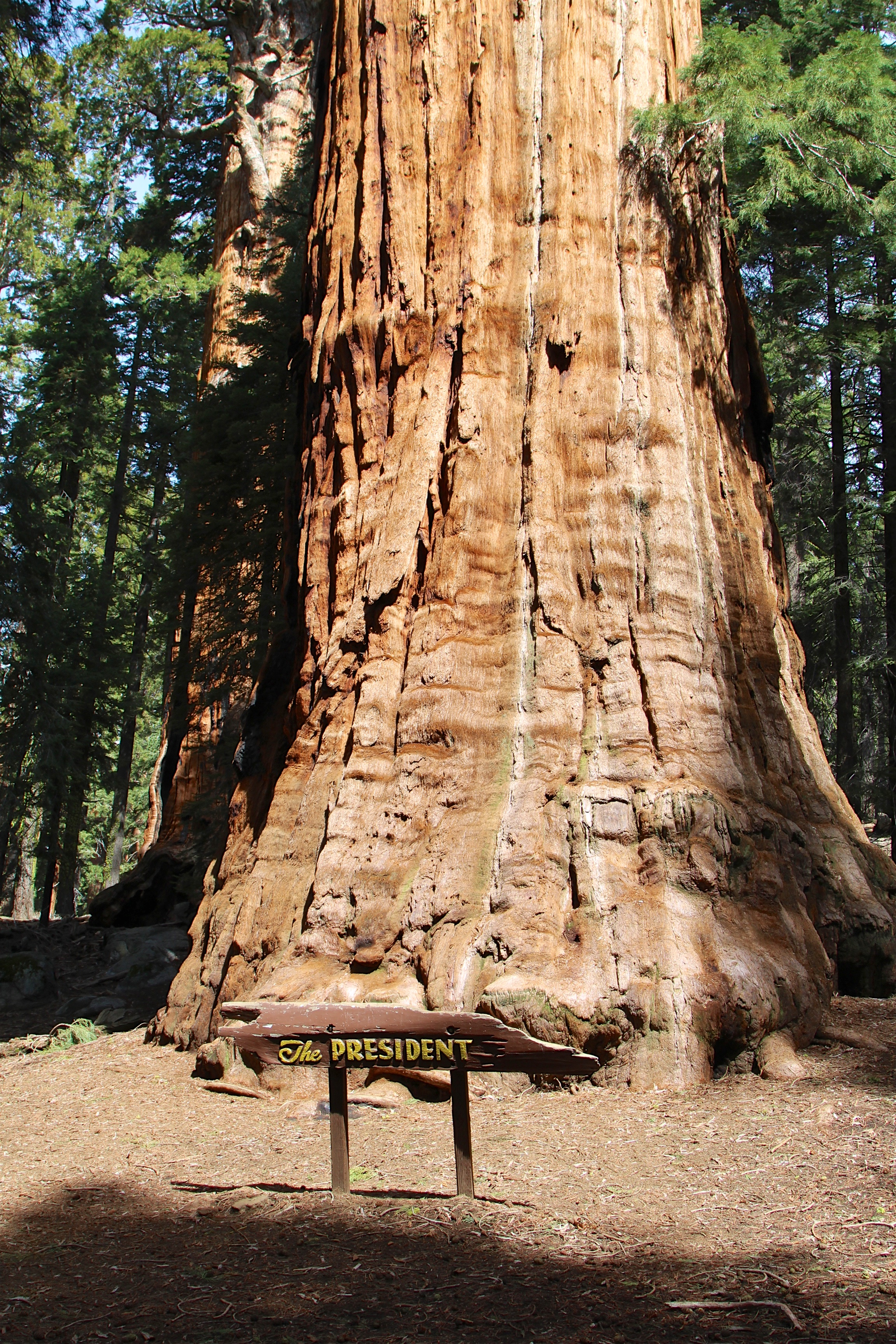
The President Tree, before the "T" came off of its sign (March 2016)

The President is a giant sequoia located in the Giant Forest of Sequoia National Park in the United States, east of Visalia, California. It is approximately 247 feet (75 m) high, and 27 feet (8.2 m) in diameter at the base. The President is currently recognised as the second-largest tree in the world, measured by overall volume of wood (trunk + branches), and the oldest-known living sequoia, about 3,240 years old. As of 2012, the volume of its trunk measured at about 54,000 cubic feet (1,500 m^{3}), with an additional 9,000 cubic feet (250 m^{3}) of branches.

The tree was named after President Warren G. Harding in 1923. Nearby trees include Chief Sequoyah, the 27th-largest giant sequoia in the world, and the Congress Group, two dense stands of medium-sized sequoias that represent the "House" and "Senate".

== Description ==
The President features a dense crown with enormous branches reaching upward and outward. An especially prominent white branch is visible the western side of the tree's upper crown. A long, narrow burn scar is present on the north side of its trunk.

== Dimensions ==
	Meters	Feet
Height above base	75.3	247.0
Circumference at ground	28.4	93.0
Diameter 1.5 m above base	7.1	23.1
Diameter 18 m (60') above base Hu3	5.2	16.9
Diameter 55 m (180') above base	3.55	11.6
Diameter of largest branch	2.43	8.0
Height of first large branch above the base	37.1	122.0
Estimated bole volume (m^{3}.ft^{3})	1,278.0	45,148.0
Estimated volume in branches (m^{3}.ft^{3})	254.9	9,000.0

== See also ==
- List of largest giant sequoias
- List of individual trees
- List of oldest trees
