= Ishi Giant =

Giant sequoia in California, United States

Coordinates: 37°45′41″N 118°48′38″W

Ishi Giant is a giant sequoia in California, United States. It is located in Kennedy Grove, which is part of a group of eight closely spaced giant sequoia groves situated in Sequoia National Forest in the Sierra Nevada in eastern central California. It was the 14th largest giant sequoia in the world before it atrophied during the Rough Fire in 2015.

== History ==
Ishi Giant was discovered by naturalist Dwight M. Willard in 1993. Naturalist Wendell D. Flint suggested naming the tree "Calavera" after the two discovered a human skull beside the tree later that same year. However, Willard chose to name the tree after Ishi, the last Yahi Yana tribesman who is believed to have been the last Native American in the United States to have lived most of his life completely outside American culture.

Before 2015, Ishi Giant measured 255 ft (78 m) tall with a trunk volume of 38,156 ft^{3} (1,080.5 m^{3}), making it the fourteenth largest giant sequoia tree in the world. The trunk of tree featured a large, deep burn scar on its southern face with two large "buttresses" on either side of its trunk. The crown of the tree was concentrated almost exclusively around the top third of its total height.

In 2015, the tree lost significant trunk volume, over 27 ft (8.2 m) in height, and over half of its crown during the Rough Fire. A new volume and height estimate is needed to determine its current size.

== See also ==
- List of largest giant sequoias
- List of individual trees
