= Hollow log =

Hollow log may refer to:

- Hollow Log (Balch Park), a hollowed-out tree in California
- Hollow log (finance), a fund or account, often clandestine, intended to hold assets in safekeeping for future use
- Hollow log coffin or memorial pole, an Aboriginal Australian ceremonial burial artefact, now created as artworks

== See also ==
- Log Hollow Falls
- Rocky Hollow Log Ride
