= Big Tree (Buff novel) =

1946 children's book by Mary and Conrad Buff

- First edition
- Author: Mary and Conrad Buff
- Illustrator: Mary and Conrad Buff
- Language: English
- Genre: Children's literature
- Publisher: Viking
- Publication date: 1946
- Publication place: United States

Big Tree is a 1946 children's novel written and illustrated by Mary and Conrad Buff. Written from the perspective of Wawona, a personified giant sequoia, the tree tells its life story spanning 5,000 years. The novel was a Newbery Honor recipient in 1947, the first of the authors' three Honors (1952 and 1954).
