= Tunnel tree =

Large tree in whose trunk a tunnel has been drilled

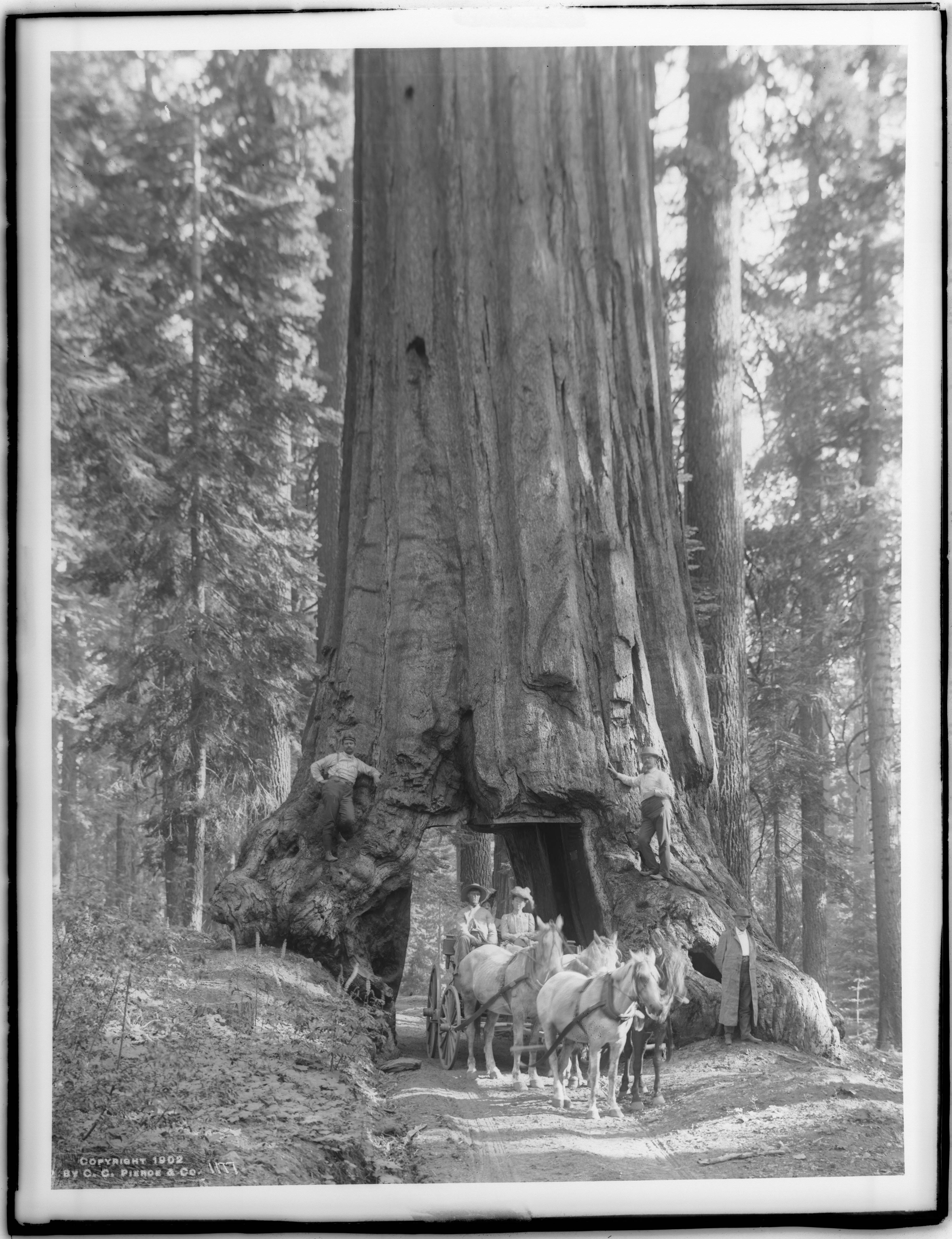
Horse-drawn wagon driving through the Wawona Tree in Mariposa Grove in Yosemite National Park, 1902

A tunnel tree is a large tree, typically a giant sequoia or coastal redwood, through which a tunnel has been carved. This practice was primarily carried out in the late 19th and early 20th centuries in the western United States, particularly in California. Tunnel trees were created as tourist attractions, allowing visitors to walk or drive through the tree, often by horse-drawn carriages or automobiles.

The creation of tunnel trees was intended to boost tourism, making the sites iconic landmarks. Examples of tunnel trees are predominantly found in national parks such as Yosemite National Park, and Sequoia and Kings Canyon National Park. Notable examples include the fallen Wawona Tree in Yosemite and the Chandelier Tree in Leggett, California.

The practice of boring tunnels into living trees caused significant harm to their structural integrity and overall health. Over time, many tunnel trees fell due to the damage inflicted during the tunneling process. As awareness of nature conservation increased, the practice was discontinued. Existing tunnel trees are preserved as historical artifacts, and no new tunnel trees are created.

The California Tunnel Tree is the only remaining giant sequoia tunnel tree, and the other three surviving tunnel trees are coastal redwoods.

List of tunnel trees
Name	Place	Tree species	Note	Picture
Wawona Tree	Mariposa Grove, Yosemite National Park	Sequoiadendron giganteum	Yosemite's Wawona Tree, tunneled in 1881 as a tourist attraction, stood for 88 years before collapsing in the winter of 1968-69. Heavy snow, wet soil, and the tunnel's weakening effects contributed to its fall. The tree was about 2,100 years old.	6209-248VacYosmiteTunlTree
Pioneer Cabin Tree	Calaveras, Calaveras Big Trees State Park	Sequoiadendron giganteum	The Pioneer Cabin Tree, the third tree to be tunneled, was 1,223 years old when it fell during a powerful winter storm in 2017.	
Tunnel Log	Sequoia and Kings Canyon National Parks	Sequoiadendron giganteum	The Tunnel Log in Sequoia National Park was created after a giant sequoia fell across Crescent Meadow Road in late 1937 due to natural causes. In 1938, a tunnel was cut through the fallen log to allow vehicles to pass and to serve as a visitor attraction.	
Chandelier Tree	Leggett	Sequoia sempervirens	The Chandelier Tree, also known as the Drive-Thru Tree, is a 315-foot-tall coast redwood located in Leggett, California. Carved in 1937, its 6-foot-wide tunnel allows vehicles to pass through, making it a popular roadside attraction at the privately owned Drive-Thru Tree Park.	
Shrine Drive-Thru Tree	Myers Flat	Sequoia sempervirens	Naturally hollowed by fire, the tree was tunneled in the early 20th century for vehicles and became a popular roadside attraction. Renamed in the 1930s, possibly for Shriners International, it shows signs of decline and has been supported by cables since 1942.	
Klamath Tour-Thru Tree	Klamath	Sequoia sempervirens	The Klamath Tour Thru Tree, carved in 1976, is a drive-through redwood located near Redwood National Park and Yurok tribal lands along the Klamath River, about 60 minutes north of Eureka, California.	
California Tunnel Tree	Mariposa Grove, Yosemite National Park	Sequoiadendron giganteum	The California Tunnel Tree, cut in 1895 to accommodate horse-drawn stages, was the second tunnel tree created in Mariposa Grove. Located in the lower grove, it stands below the snowline for longer periods than the Wawona Tree, prompting its selection. Today, it is the last remaining giant sequoia tunnel tree still standing. It is accessible via a walking trail; it is not possible to drive a car through it.	
Dead Giant Tunnel Tree	Tuolumne, Yosemite National Park	Sequoiadendron giganteum	The Dead Giant Tunnel Tree, created in 1878, was the first tunnel tree. It was carved from a dead stump in Tuolumne Grove that already had natural fire caves, making it easy to tunnel through. The tree was created to attract visitors traveling the Big Oak Flat road to Yosemite, which had opened in 1870.	Tunnel tree in Tuolumne Grove

== See also ==
- Exhibition Tree
- List of individual trees
- Culture of California
- History of California
- Tourist attraction
- Tree tunnel, natural growth of trees over a road
