= Chandelier Tree =

Coast redwood tunnel tree in California

Chandelier tree
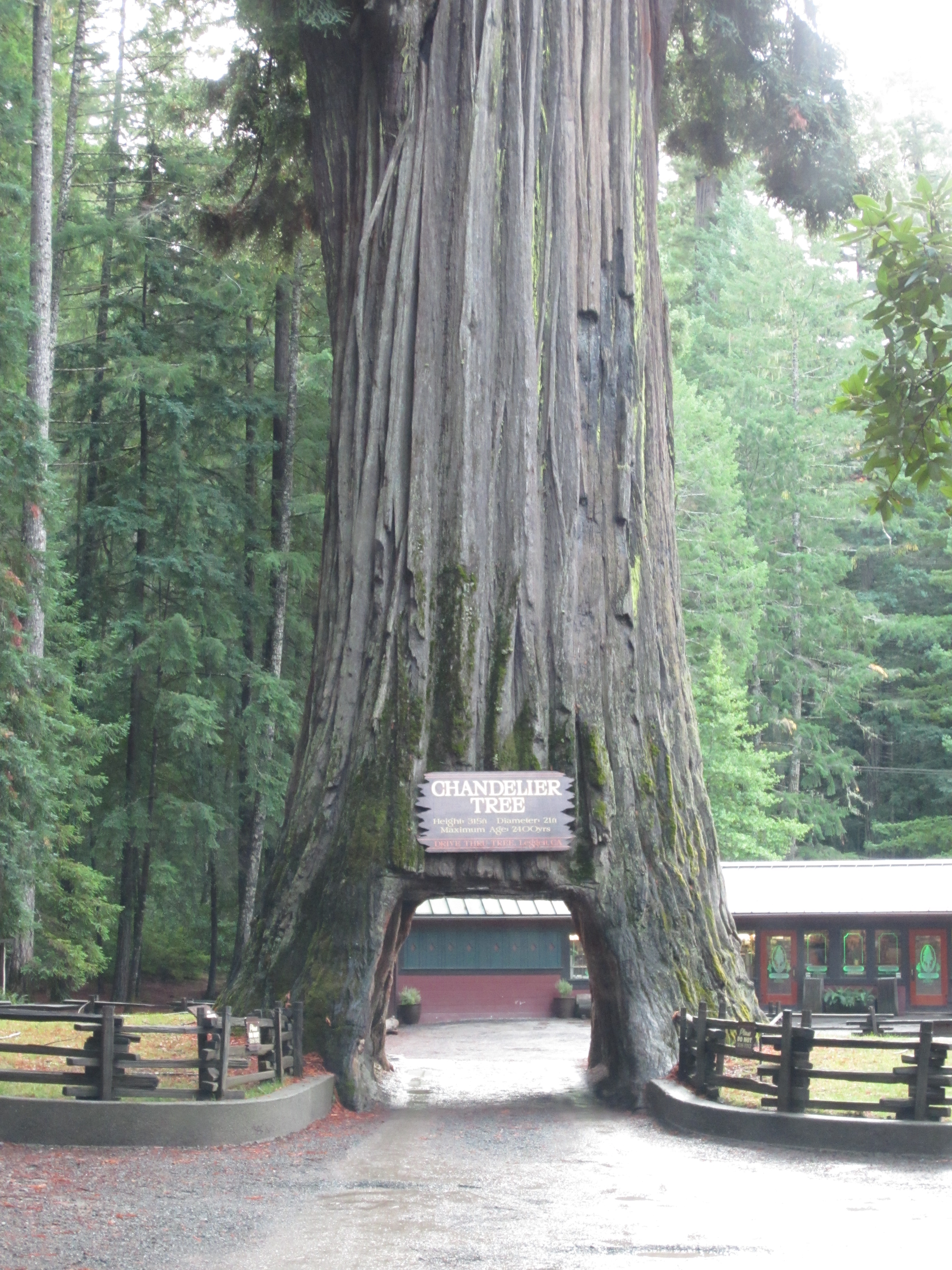
- The Chandelier Tree in 2015
- Interactive map of Chandelier tree
- Species: Coast redwood (Sequoia sempervirens)
- Location: Leggett, California, US
- Coordinates: 39°51′30″N 123°43′09″W
- Website: http://www.drivethrutree.com/

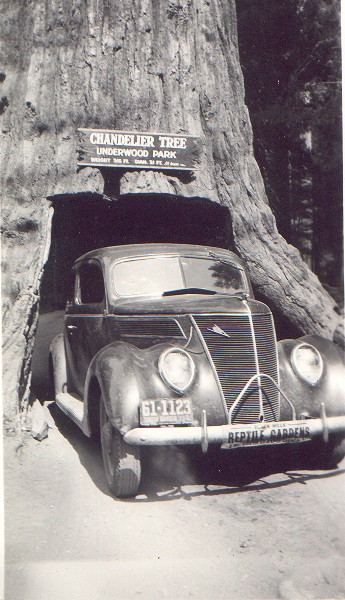
1941

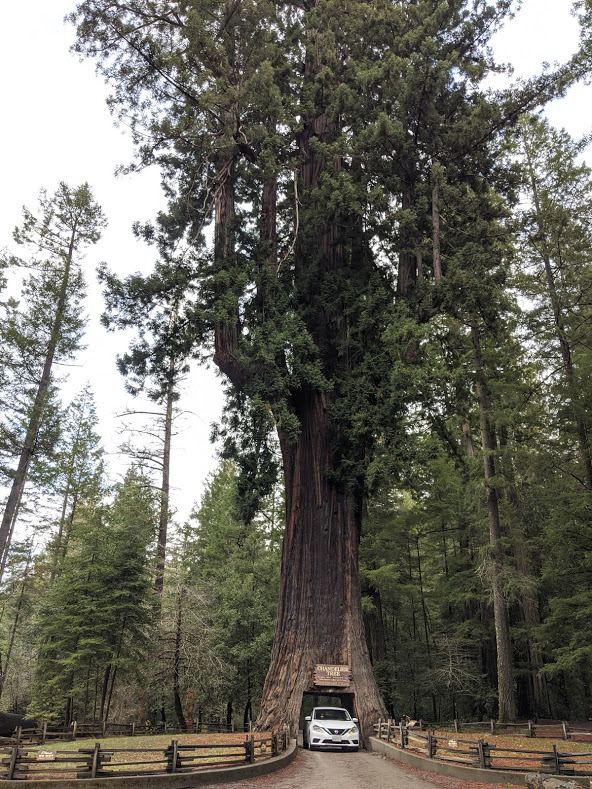
2019

The Chandelier Tree in Drive-Thru Tree Park is a 276-foot (84 m) tall coast redwood tree in Leggett, California, with a 6-foot-wide (1.8 m) by 6-foot-9-inch-high (2.06 m) hole cut through its base to allow a car to drive through. Its base measures 16 ft (4.9 m) diameter at breast height (chest-high). A historic sign put up in or before the 1930s claims a height of 315 feet high and 21 feet wide (which may have been true for both at the time it was hung), but a contemporary measurement by a Certified Arborist experienced with tall redwoods and using a laser rangefinder found the tree to be 276 feet high and 16 feet in diameter. It is unknown if the tree was topped by Nature in between the measurements.

The name "Chandelier Tree" comes from its unusual limbs that resemble a chandelier. The limbs, which measure from 4 to 7 ft (1.2 to 2.1 m) in diameter, begin 100 ft (30 m) above the ground. It is 2,400 years old.

A vintage postcard of the Chandelier Tree was shown during the opening credits of National Lampoon's Vacation.

== History ==
The Chandelier Tree stands on privately owned property. Charles and Hazel Underwood purchased the grove in 1921. The opening was cut in the late 1930s to create an attraction for those driving along the Redwood Highway.

In the 1960s, they offered visitors lodging amenities which included cabins, a recreation hall, and bar.

== Visiting ==
A fee of $10 is charged for pedestrians to walk through or motorcyclists to drive through the trees. For regular sized automobiles, the price is $15. Visitors are welcome between 8:30 AM and sundown every day of the year except Christmas and Thanksgiving.

Visitors can also enjoy various other features during their visit including hiking trails, a duck pond, meadow, picnic tables, and a gift shop.

During the summertime the Chandelier Tree may receive up to 500 visitors daily. Some larger modern vehicles may be unable to fit through due to the small size of the opening.

In 2022, the tree won a Traveler's Choice Award from Trip Advisor.

== Other tunnel trees ==
A number of big trees in California had tunnels dug through them in the late 1800s and early 1900s. The tunnel allowed tourists to drive, bike, or walk through the tree. The tunneling inflicted severe damage to the health and strength of the trees. The tunnels were cut to stimulate automobile tourism. Because of the damaging effects of carving through trees, the trend of creating tunnel trees has long passed.

=== Giant sequoias ===
The two giant sequoia drive-through trees have both fallen:

- Wawona Tree fell in 1969 in Mariposa Grove, Yosemite National Park
- Pioneer Cabin Tree fell in 2017 in Calaveras Big Trees State Park

But two walk-through tunnel trees still stand:

- California Tunnel Tree in Mariposa Grove, Yosemite National Park. The California Tunnel Tree's passageway was dug in 1895 to allow horse-drawn stagecoaches to pass through the tree. Today, people can walk or bike through it.
- A dead tunnel tree in Tuolumne Grove, Yosemite National Park. The dead tunnel tree in Tuolumne Grove was the first standing sequoia to be tunneled.

=== Coast redwoods ===
Two other drive-through coast redwood trees (taller and more slender than giant sequoias) still stand. These are also along US 101 in northern California, in Klamath and Myers Flat.

== See also ==
- Avenue of the Giants
- List of individual trees
