= Pioneer Cabin Tree =

Historical giant sequoia tunnel tree in Calaveras Big Trees State Park, California

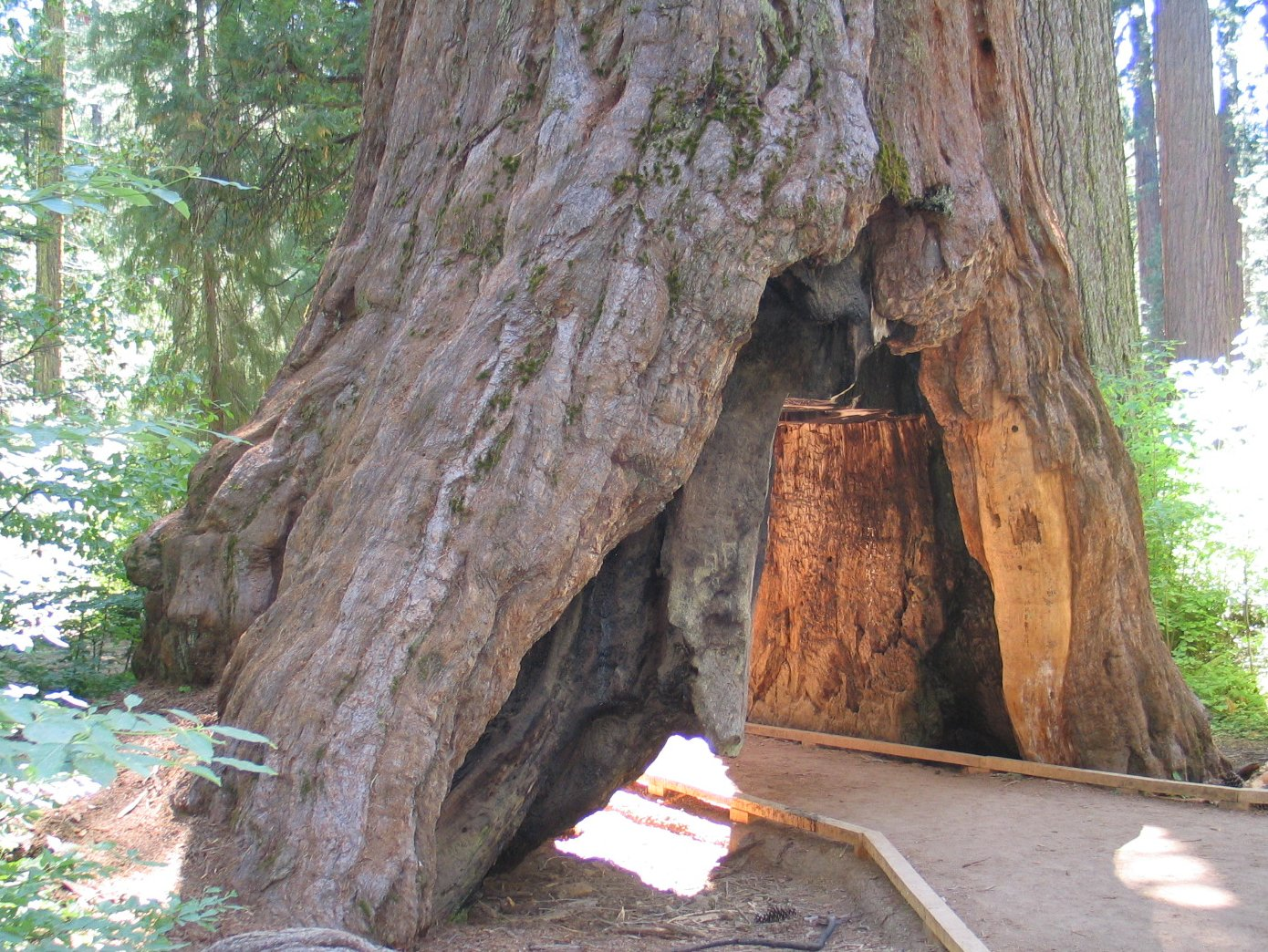
- The Pioneer Cabin Tree in 2006
- Interactive map of Pioneer Cabin Tree
- Species: Giant sequoia (Sequoiadendron giganteum)
- Location: Calaveras Big Trees State Park, California, U.S.
- Coordinates: 38°16′48.6″N 120°18′11.3″W
- Date felled: January 8, 2017

The Pioneer Cabin Tree, also known as The Tunnel Tree, was a giant sequoia in Calaveras Big Trees State Park, California. It was considered one of the U.S.'s most famous trees, and drew thousands of visitors annually. It was estimated to have been more than 1,000 years old, and measured 33 feet (10 m) in diameter; its exact age and height were not known. (Note: An 1856 news article lists the height of the tree without its broken off top as 150 feet (46 m). In 1900, the United States Forest Service wrote it was 280 feet (85 m) tall.) The tree was topped before 1859. It fell and shattered during a storm on January 8, 2017.

== History ==
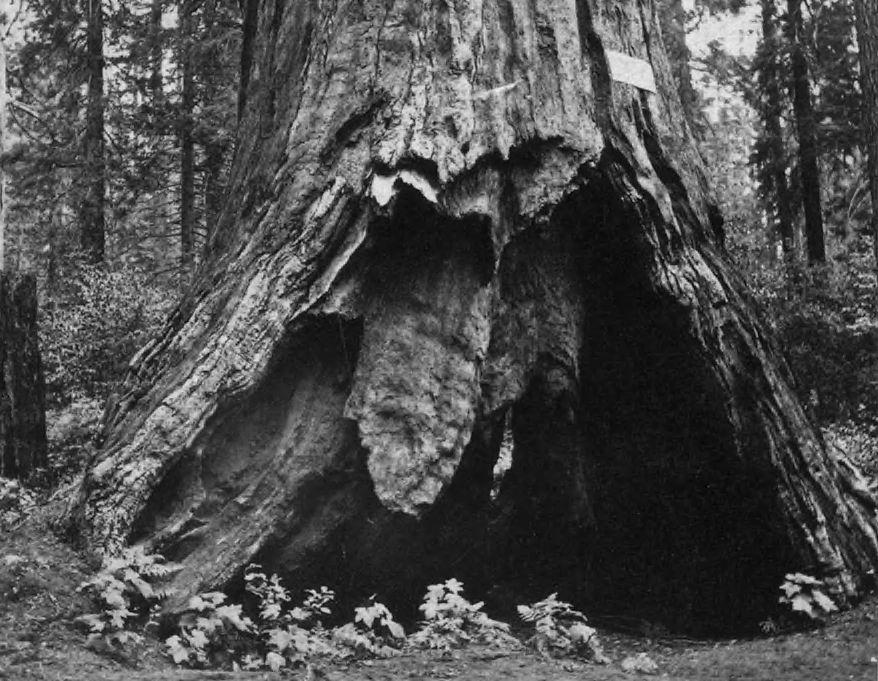
c. 1860–1880, before the tunnel was opened further

The Pioneer Cabin Tree got its name from its distinctively hollow trunk, partially burnt by lightning strikes and forest fire. It had small compartments as in a log cabin, with the tree's burnt core as a chimney, and a small opening as a backdoor.

In 1857 it was noted that the "top half" of the tree was broken off at about 150 feet, and that the tree was hollow.

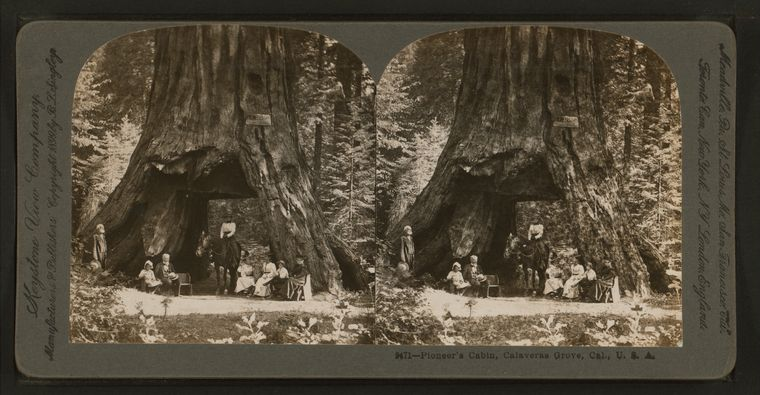
A stereoscope image of the Pioneer Cabin Tree with people and horse passing through (c. 1867–1899)

In the early 1880s, a tunnel was cut through the compartments by a private land owner at the request of James Sperry, founder of the Murphys Hotel, so that tourists could pass through it. The tree was chosen in part because of the large forest fire scar. The Pioneer Cabin Tree emulated the tunnel carved into Yosemite's Wawona Tree, and was intended to compete with it for tourists.

Since the 1880s and for more than 50 years, visitor graffiti was encouraged, but this practice was prohibited in the 1930s. At first only pedestrians were allowed to pass through the tree. Later, for many years, automobiles drove through it as part of the "Big Trees Trail". It was one of several drive-through trees in California. (Note: "It's unclear exactly how old the tree was, but the Los Angeles Times reports that the trees in the state park are estimated to be more than 1,000 years old. Sequoias can live for more than 3,000 years. The iconic tree was one of just a few tunneled-through sequoias in California. The most famous was the Wawona Tree, in Yosemite National Park; it fell during a winter storm in 1969 at an estimated age of 2,100 years. The other remaining sequoia tunnels are dead or consist of logs [lying] on their side, the Forest Service says.") Subsequently, only hikers were allowed to pass through the tree's tunnel as part of the North Grove Loop hiking trail.

== Fall ==
The Pioneer Cabin Tree fell during a rain storm and flooding on January 8, 2017. It was the strongest storm to hit the area in over a decade. The flooding, combined with the shallow root system of giant sequoias, likely caused it to fall. A park volunteer reported that the tree had been weakening, becoming brittle and leaning to one side for several years, with only a single branch remaining alive. It had been weakened by the severe damage caused by the tunnel carved through its trunk. The tree shattered on impact with the ground due to the brittle wood of mature sequoias.

After the fall of the tree the park trail closed for a cleanup operation. Some sections of the tree remained intact, but the park's preservation policy prevented them from being cut up, for example to determine the tree's exact age.

At least one observer suggested that the tree fell victim to the profit motive and greed, not just a storm, as it was one of several trees that were mutilated to promote tourism. California State Parks supervising ranger Tony Tealdi said in the modern day the hollowing out of a tree would not have been permitted.

== Drive-through and other noted trees ==
This was one of several trees that were hollowed out for the amusement of tourists.

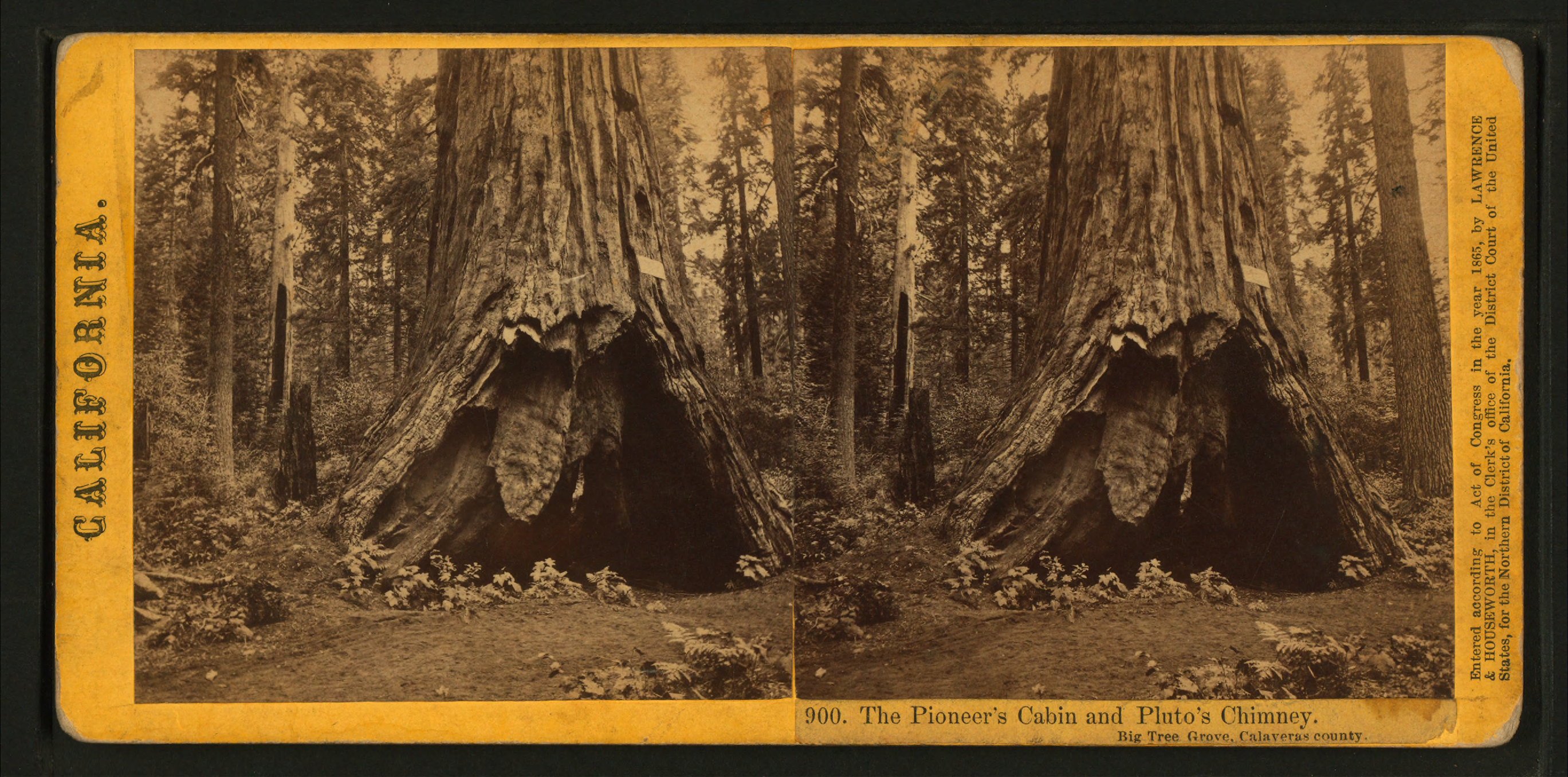
A stereoscope image of the Pioneer Cabin Tree and Pluto's Chimney (left in the distance) (c. 1864–1874)

The two giant sequoia drive-through trees have both fallen:

- Wawona Tree, in Mariposa Grove, Yosemite National Park, fell in 1969.
- Pioneer Cabin Tree, in Calaveras Big Trees State Park, fell in 2017.

Two walk-through giant sequoia tunnel trees still stand:

- California tunnel tree in Mariposa Grove, Yosemite National Park
- A dead tunnel tree in Tuolumne Grove, Yosemite National Park

Two others have edifices carved within:

- Hercules Tree in Mountain Home State Forest has a room carved into it, and it is still alive.
- Tharp's Log in Sequoia National Park Giant Forest, a fire-hollowed fallen giant, was utilized as part of a cattleman's cabin.

Tunnel Log is a fallen giant sequoia tree in Sequoia National Park. The tree, which measured 275 feet (84 m) tall and 21 feet (6.4 m) in diameter, fell across a park road in 1937 due to natural causes. The following year, a crew cut an 8-foot (2.4 m) tall, 17-foot (5.2 m) wide tunnel through the trunk, making the road passable again.

There are three coast redwood trees that can be driven through near US 101 in northern California, namely: Klamath Tour Thru Tree; Shrine Drive-Thru Tree; and Chandelier Tree.

The loss of the Pioneer Cabin Tree occasioned an encomium to other important trees that still remain.

== See also ==
- List of giant sequoia groves
- List of individual trees
- List of California state parks
- Mother of the Forest – a huge Sequoiadendron tree
