= Allen Russell Tree =

Giant sequoia in California

Coordinates: 36.22342°N 118.67643°W

The Allen Russell Tree is the 32nd or 33rd largest giant sequoia in the world. It is also the largest tree in Balch County Park, and is part of the Mountain Home Grove, a sequoia grove located in the southern Sierra Nevada mountains of California, United States. It is the 34th largest giant sequoia in the world, and could be considered either the 33rd or 32nd largest depending on how badly Ishi Giant and Black Mountain Beauty have atrophied following devastating wildfires in 2015 and 2017, respectively.

== History ==
The Allen Russell Tree was measured in 1985 by "big tree hunter" Wendell Flint and photographer Mike Law, who determined that it was at the time the 34th largest tree in the world, in terms of volume, and the largest tree in Balch Park. Today it ranks as the 33rd largest tree. It was subsequently dedicated in 1990 by Tulare County to Allen I. Russell, the ranger of Balch County Park from 1961 to 1990, for his many years of service to the park.

== Dimensions ==
The dimensions of the Allen Russell Tree as measured by Flint and Law are shown below. The calculated volume ignores burns.

	Metres	Feet
Height above base	77.4	253.9
Circumference at ground	24.3	79.7
Diameter 5 ft (1.5 m) above ground	6.6	21.7
Diameter 60 ft (18.3 m) above ground	4.2	13.9
Diameter 120 ft (36.6 m) above ground	4.0	13.2
Diameter 180 ft (54.9 m) above ground	3.1	10.1
Estimated volume (m^{3}.ft^{3})	895	31,606

== See also ==
- List of largest giant sequoias
- List of individual trees
- Balch Park
- Mountain Home Grove
