= Wawona Tree =

Giant sequoia tree in Yosemite National Park, California

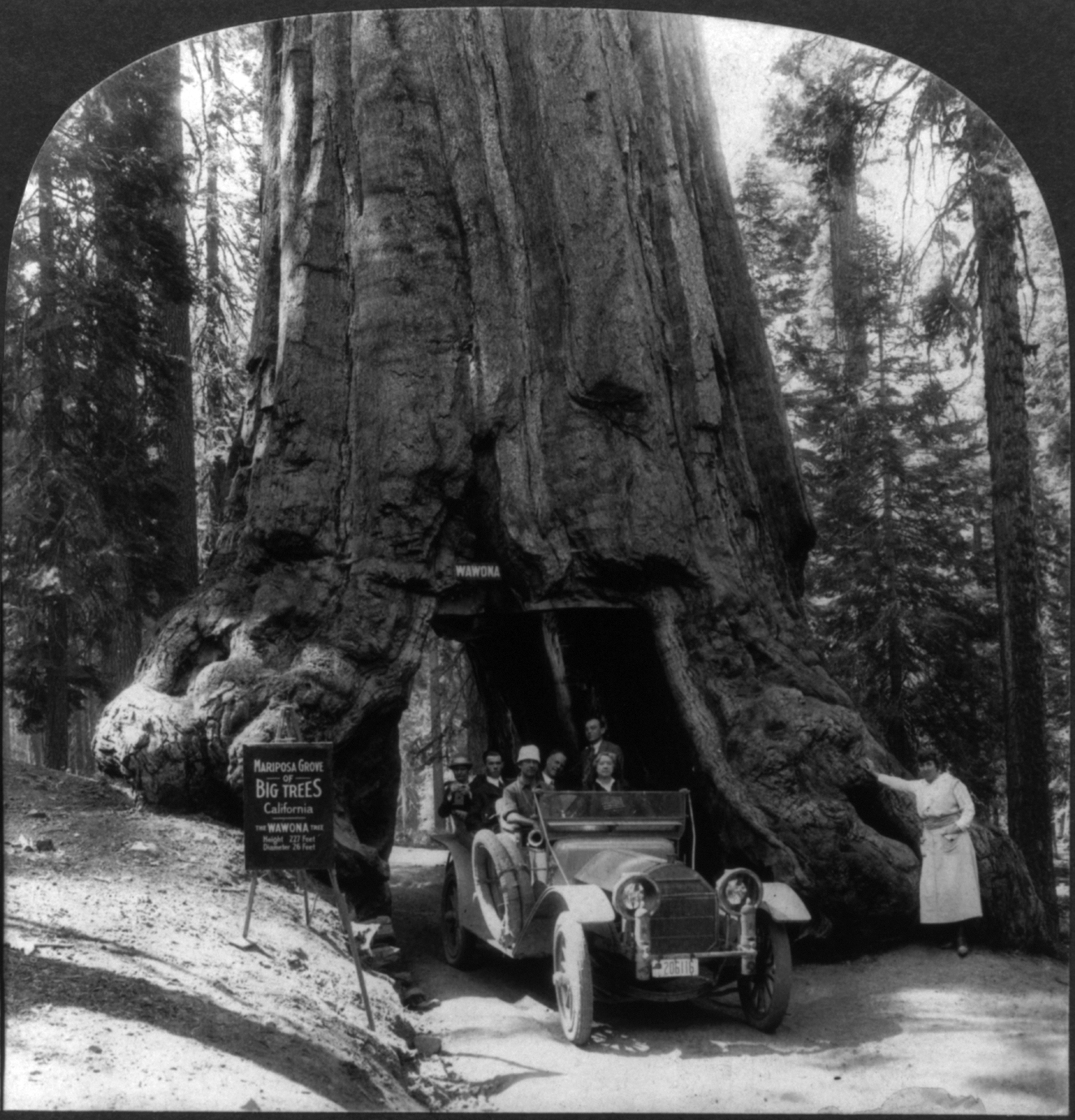
- Wawona Tunnel Tree, June 1918
- Interactive map of Wawona Tree
- Species: Giant sequoia (Sequoiadendron giganteum)
- Location: Mariposa Grove, Yosemite National Park, California, US
- Coordinates: 37°30′53″N 119°35′42″W
- Date felled: February 1969

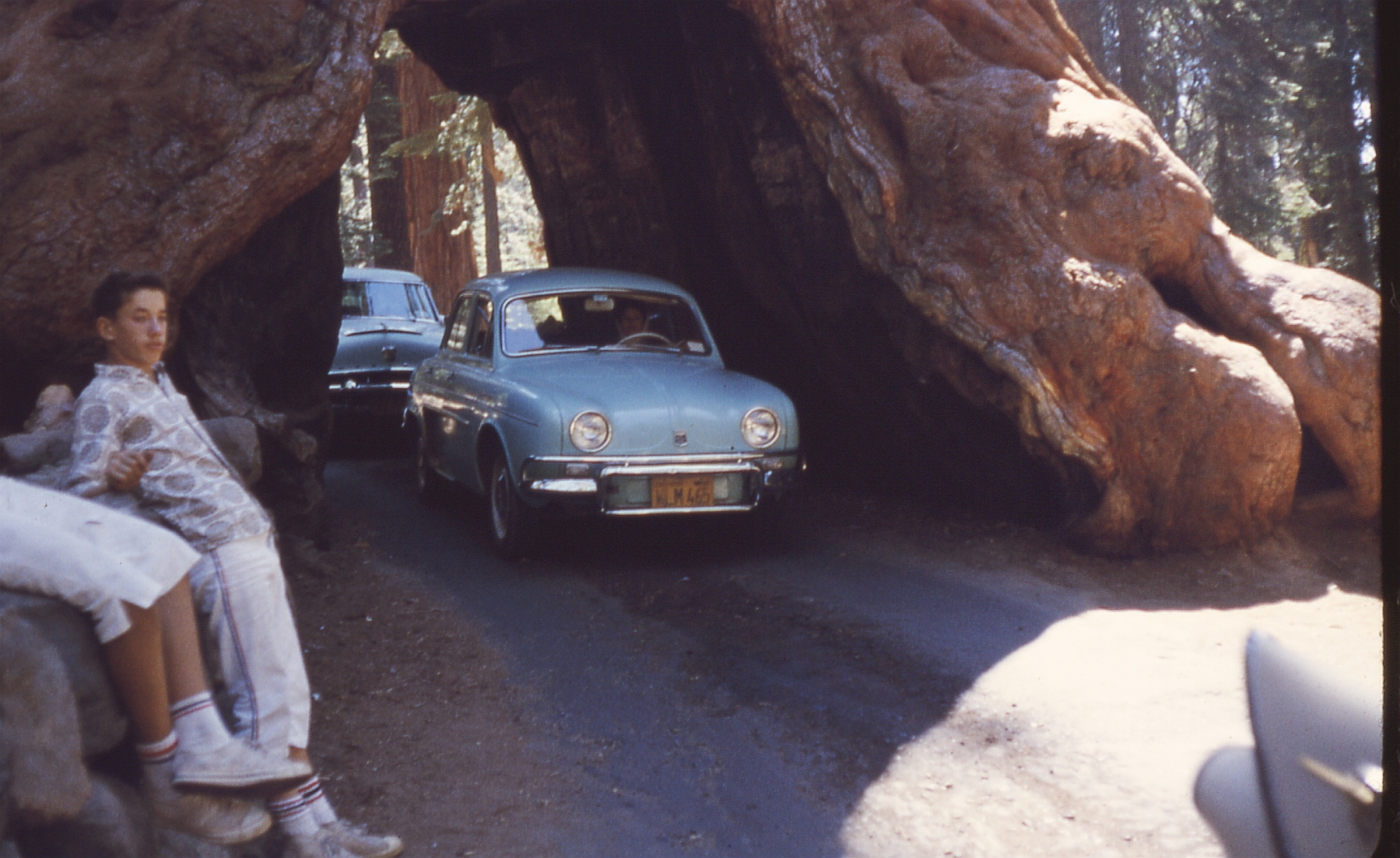
Wawona Tunnel Tree, August 1962

The Wawona Tree, also known as the Wawona Tunnel Tree, was a famous giant sequoia that stood in Mariposa Grove, Yosemite National Park, California, United States, until February 1969. It had a height of 227 feet (69 m) and was 26 feet (7.9 m) in diameter at the base.

The origin of the word Wawona is not known. A popular story claims Wawō'na was the Miwok word for "big tree", or for "hoot of the owl". Birds are considered the sequoia trees' spiritual guardian.

== History ==
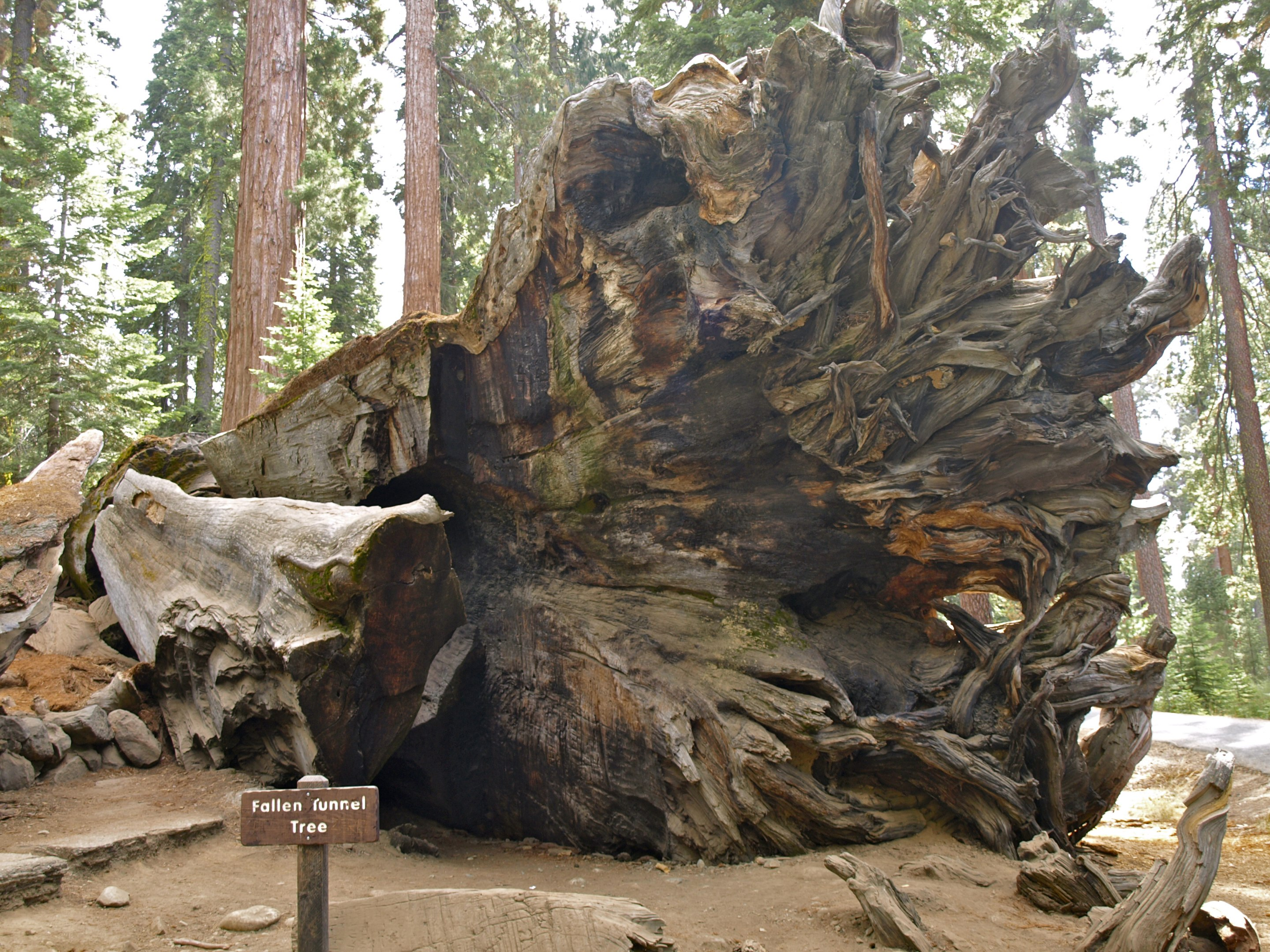
The fallen tree, October 2012

A tunnel was cut through the tree in 1881, enlarging an existing fire scar. Two men, the Scribner brothers, were paid $75 for the job (equivalent to $2,502 in 2025). The tree had a slight lean, which increased when the tunnel was completed. Created by the Yosemite Stage and Turnpike Company as a tourist attraction, this human-made tunnel became immensely popular. Visitors were often photographed driving through or standing in the tunnel.

After the National Park Service was founded in 1916, promoting the tunnel through the Wawona Tree became part an effort to increase tourism in the age of the automobile. Its first Director, Stephen Mather, saw building a tourist clientele for the parks as a means of attracting increasing appropriations from Congress in order to both strengthen the agency's ability to carry out its mission and increase public appreciation of America's wild treasures. Mather and his chief aide, Horace Albright, who would also be his successor, worked to make the parks more accessible, and, with drive-through attractions such as the Tunnel Tree, as memorable as possible.

Mather and Albright had already worked with western railroads on the "See America First" campaign, trying to increase visitation to the parks. In the 1920s, the Park Service actively promoted automobile tourism. Roads and roadside attractions bloomed on the sites of Yellowstone, the Grand Canyon, and Yosemite. Roads, they believed, would also increase accessibility for "those who are not as strong and agile as you and I, for they too are entitled to their inspiration and enjoyment," as Albright stated in a 1931 letter about roads in the Smokies. Around this time, the term 'scenic drive' became introduced into the national vocabulary.

The Wawona Tree may also have served as the inspiration for the 1946 children's book Big Tree, by Mary and Conrad Buff.

The Wawona Tree fell in February 1969 under a heavy load of snow on its crown. The giant sequoia is estimated to have been 2,300 years old. When the giant tree fell, there was much debate over what to do with it. It has remained where it fell primarily for ecological reasons, but still serves as a popular tourist destination. Because of their size, giant sequoias can create vast new ecosystems when they fall, providing habitat for insects and animals and allowing new plant growth. It is now known as the Fallen Tunnel Tree.

Visitors to nearby Sequoia National Park sometimes confuse Yosemite's Fallen Tunnel Tree with Sequoia National Park's Tunnel Log. A modest notice of both the Wawona Tree and another tunnel tree appears in the May 28, 1899 issue of a Sacramento Daily Union article: "In the lower grove there is another tree through which the wagon road runs. It is named California and is twenty-one feet in diameter at the base and 248 feet in height."

== Other uses ==
Pacific Life adopted the Wawona Tree as its symbol and trademark in the early 1900s because it symbolized endurance, strength, and protection. The company commissioned sculptor Spero Anargyros to carve the Wawona Tree in the foyer of their San Francisco Northern California headquarters in 1956. A replica of Anargyros' Wawona Tree carving was featured on one side of Pacific Life's centenary medallion in 1968.

== Other tunnel trees ==
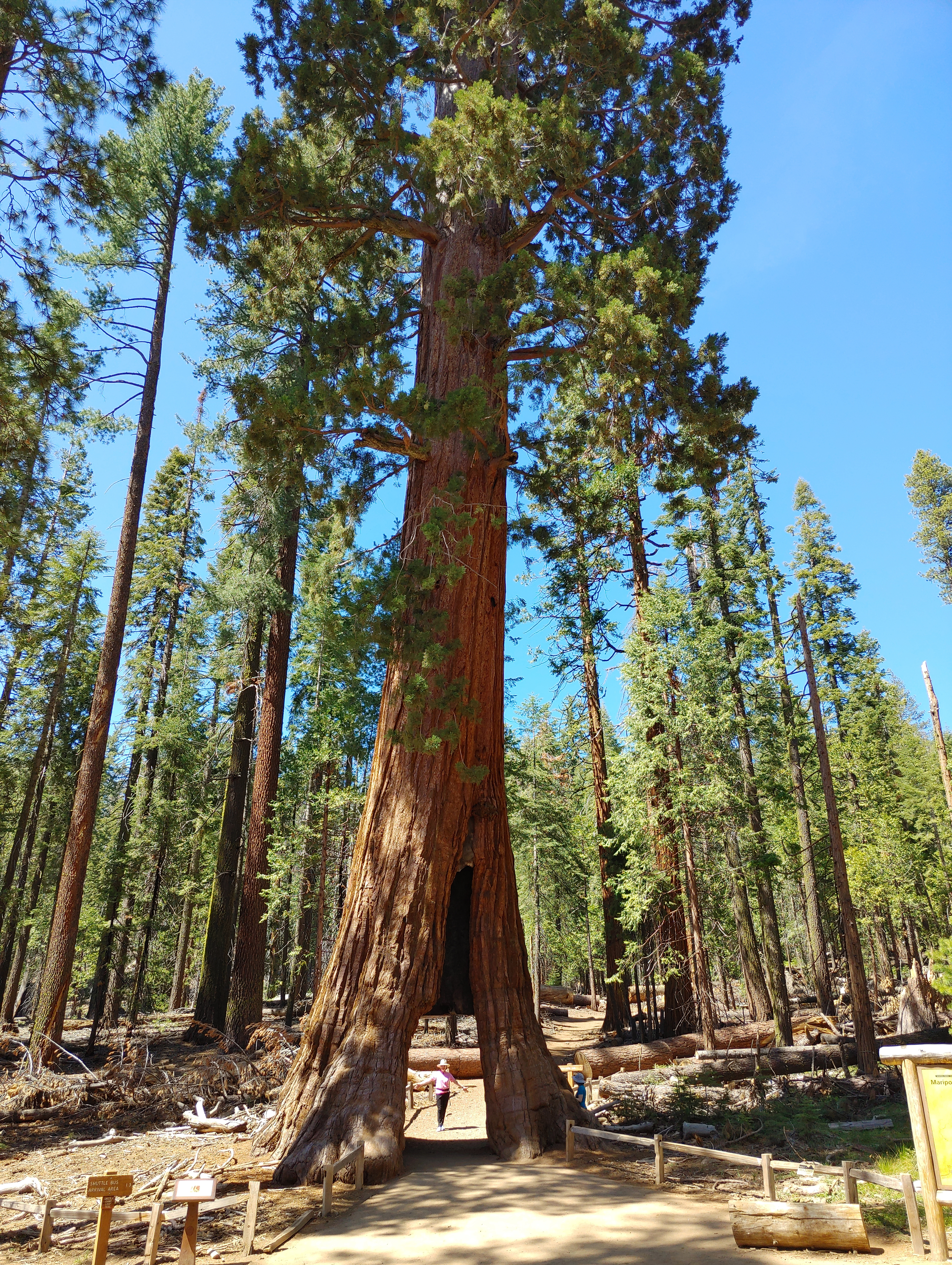
California Tunnel Tree in Mariposa Grove, Yosemite National Park

A number of big trees in California had tunnels dug through them in the late 1800s and early 1900s. The tunnel allowed tourists to drive, bike, or walk through the tree. The tunneling inflicted severe damage to the health and strength of the trees. The tunnels were cut to stimulate automobile tourism. Because of the damaging effects of carving through trees, the practice of creating tunnel trees has long passed.

=== Giant sequoias ===
The other giant sequoia drive-through tree has also fallen:

- Pioneer Cabin Tree fell in 2017 in Calaveras Big Trees State Park

But two walk-through tunnel trees still stand:

- California Tunnel Tree in Mariposa Grove, Yosemite National Park. The California Tunnel Tree's passageway was dug in 1895 to allow horse-drawn stagecoaches to pass through the tree. Today, people can walk or bike through it.
- A dead tunnel tree in Tuolumne Grove, Yosemite National Park. The dead tunnel tree in Tuolumne Grove was the first standing sequoia to be tunneled.

Many people believe "the tree you can drive through" is in Sequoia National Park. Sequoia never had a standing drive-through tree, but it does have the Tunnel Log, which was cut in 1938 through a sequoia that fell along the Crescent Meadow Road in Giant Forest.

=== Coast redwoods ===
- Chandelier Tree – another tunnel tree, but a coast redwood, not a giant sequoia
- Two other drive-through coast redwood trees (taller and more slender than giant sequoias) still stand. These are along US 101 in northern California, in Klamath and Myers Flat.

== See also ==
- List of individual trees
