= Balch Park =

County park in Sierra Nevada mountains of California

- Location within the United States
- Location: Tulare County, California
- Nearest city: Springville, California
- Coordinates: 36°13′13″N 118°40′46″W
- Area: 160 acres (64.7 ha)
- Governing body: Tulare County, California

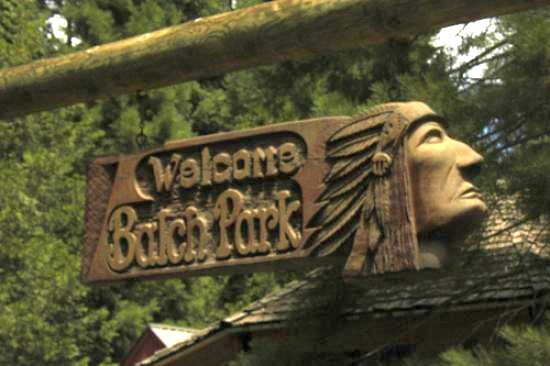
Carved wooden sign at the entrance to Balch County Park.

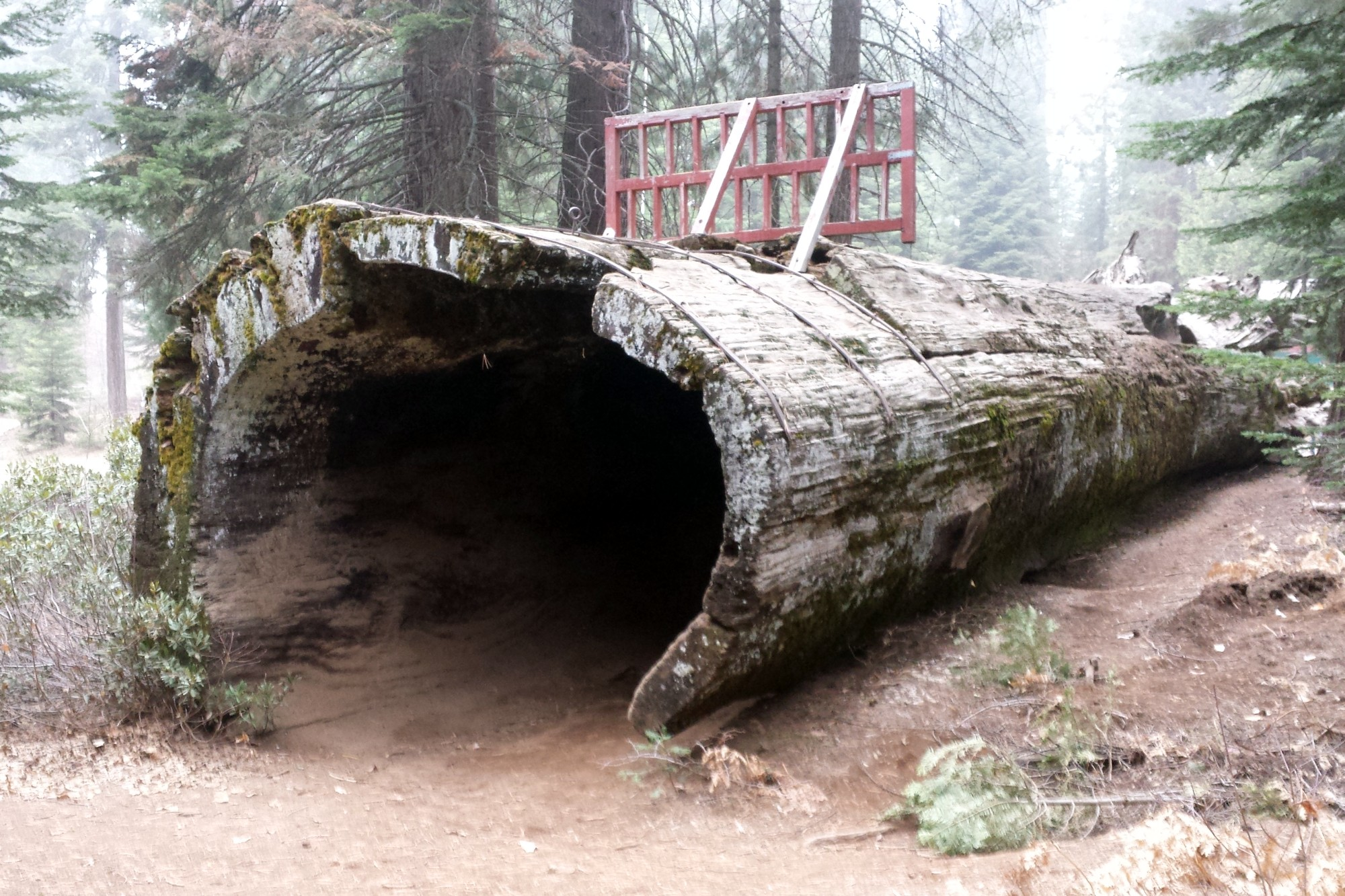
The Hollow Log is one of the best known features of Balch County Park.

Balch Park is a county park in the southern Sierra Nevada mountains of California that features a grove of Giant Sequoia trees. It also has archaeological sites relating to the early Native Americans of the area, and to the late 19th- and early 20th-century logging industry that cut down many of the big trees in the area.

== Description ==
Balch Park is known for its grove of Giant Sequoia trees that rivals the better known groves of nearby Sequoia National Park and Kings Canyon National Park. Two of the more impressive trees in the park are the Lady Alice Tree and the Allen Russell Tree, which is the 33rd largest Sequoia in the world and the largest tree in Balch Park. There is also the Hollow Log, which is a fallen Giant Sequoia that was formerly used as a dwelling and a warehouse. Just outside the park is the Genesis Tree, the 7th largest tree in the world, and the Adam Tree, which is the 20th largest tree.

The area once supported several lumber mills, and even though many of the larger trees in the surrounding forest were logged, the trees at Balch Park were spared due to the efforts of conservation minded individuals, some of whom hoped to save the trees for future generations, and some of whom looked to profit from the trees as tourist attractions. A small museum near the entrance to the park has exhibits dedicated to the logging history of the area, and a nature trail that begins at the museum winds through several of the larger trees.

Three large ponds within the park are popular fishing destinations, and are among some of the better known attractions in the area. One of these ponds, the Hedrick pond near the north edge of the park, was previously associated with an old lumber mill, and two others nearer the museum were dammed by the park authority in 1958 and made to resemble mill ponds.

The park also has some unique archaeological sites including the "Indian Bathtubs", which are large basins in the granite bedrock near the ponds. These features have a controversial origin. Because they generally are closely associated with Indian bedrock mortar holes that are known to be man-made, some argue a man-made origin for the bathtubs also, whereas others insist that the bathtubs are natural features resulting from complex erosion processes. Some have even suggested that the bathtubs were created by alien visitors from outer space.

== History ==
John J. Doyle in the mid-1880s acquired a 160 acres (64.7 ha) parcel in the area that corresponds today to Balch Park. Doyle established a resort that he called "Summer Home", with the intent of selling up to 125 lots to be developed with cabins. However, the lot sales never took place, and Doyle sold out in 1906 to the Mt. Whitney Power Company, which had plans to log the site for lumber to build a flume to carry water to a proposed power plant project. Once again no development or logging took place, and the Mt. Whitney company sold the project, and with it the land and trees, in 1923 to the San Joaquin Light and Power Company. The president of San Joaquin Light and Power, Allan C. Balch, eventually decided against logging the trees and donated the property in 1930 to Tulare County for a park to be named after him and his wife. After the Mountain Home State Demonstration Forest was set up in 1946, there was an attempt to transfer the park to State control. However, this was prevented by the terms of the original donation, and Balch Park today remains under control of Tulare County.

== See also ==
Mountain Home Grove
