= Summit Road Tree =

Giant sequoia in Mountain Home Grove, California

Coordinates: 36.2281°N 118.6711°W

The Summit Road Tree is a giant sequoia located in the Mountain Home Grove, one of several sequoia groves found in the southern Sierra Nevada of California. It is the 16th largest giant sequoia in the world, and could be considered the 15th largest depending on how badly Ishi Giant atrophied during the Rough Fire in 2015.

== History ==
The Summit Road Tree, also known as the Summit Tree, was named and measured in 1988 by "big tree hunter" Wendell Flint, with the help of friends Mike Law and Jerry Latham. Flint later determined that it was by volume the 16th largest tree in the world. However, the number two tree, the Washington Tree, lost its ranking in 2003 due to damage from a lightning strike, and the Summit Road Tree is now considered the 16th largest.

== Dimensions ==
The dimensions of the Summit Road Tree as measured by Flint, Law and Latham are shown below. The calculated volume ignores burns.

	Metres	Feet
Height above base	74.4	244.0
Circumference at ground	25.1	82.2
Diameter 5 ft (1.5 m) above ground	6.3	20.6
Diameter 60 ft (18.3 m) above ground	5.0	16.4
Diameter 120 ft (36.6 m) above ground	5.0	13.6
Diameter 180 ft (54.9 m) above ground	3.2	10.6
Estimated volume (m³.ft³)	1,036	36,600

== See also ==
- List of largest giant sequoias
- List of individual trees
- Mountain Home Grove
