= Euclid Tree =

Giant sequoia in Mountain Home Grove, California

Coordinates: 36.2294°N 118.6777°W

The Euclid Tree is a giant sequoia located in the Mountain Home Grove, one of several sequoia groves found in the southern Sierra Nevada of California. It is the 17th largest giant sequoia in the world, and could be considered the 16th largest depending on how badly Ishi Giant atrophied during the Rough Fire in 2015.

== History ==
The Euclid Tree was named and measured in 1989 by "big tree hunter" Wendell Flint, with the help of Bob Walker. Flint later determined that it was by volume the 17th largest tree in the world. However, the number two tree, the Washington Tree, lost its ranking in 2003 due to damage from a lightning strike, and the Euclid Tree is now considered the 16th largest.

== Dimensions ==
The dimensions of the Euclid Tree as measured by Flint and Walker are shown below. The calculated volume ignores burns.

	Metres	Feet
Height above base	83.1	272.7
Circumference at ground	25.4	83.4
Diameter 5 ft (1.5 m) above ground	6.2	20.3
Diameter 60 ft (18.3 m) above ground	4.6	15.2
Diameter 120 ft (36.6 m) above ground	4.3	14.2
Diameter 180 ft (54.9 m) above ground	3.6	11.9
Estimated volume (m³.ft³)	1,023	36,122

== See also ==
- List of largest giant sequoias
- List of individual trees
- Mountain Home Grove
