= Methuselah (sequoia tree) =

Giant sequoia tree in the Sierra Nevada, eastern California

Coordinates: 36.240254°N 118.680249°W

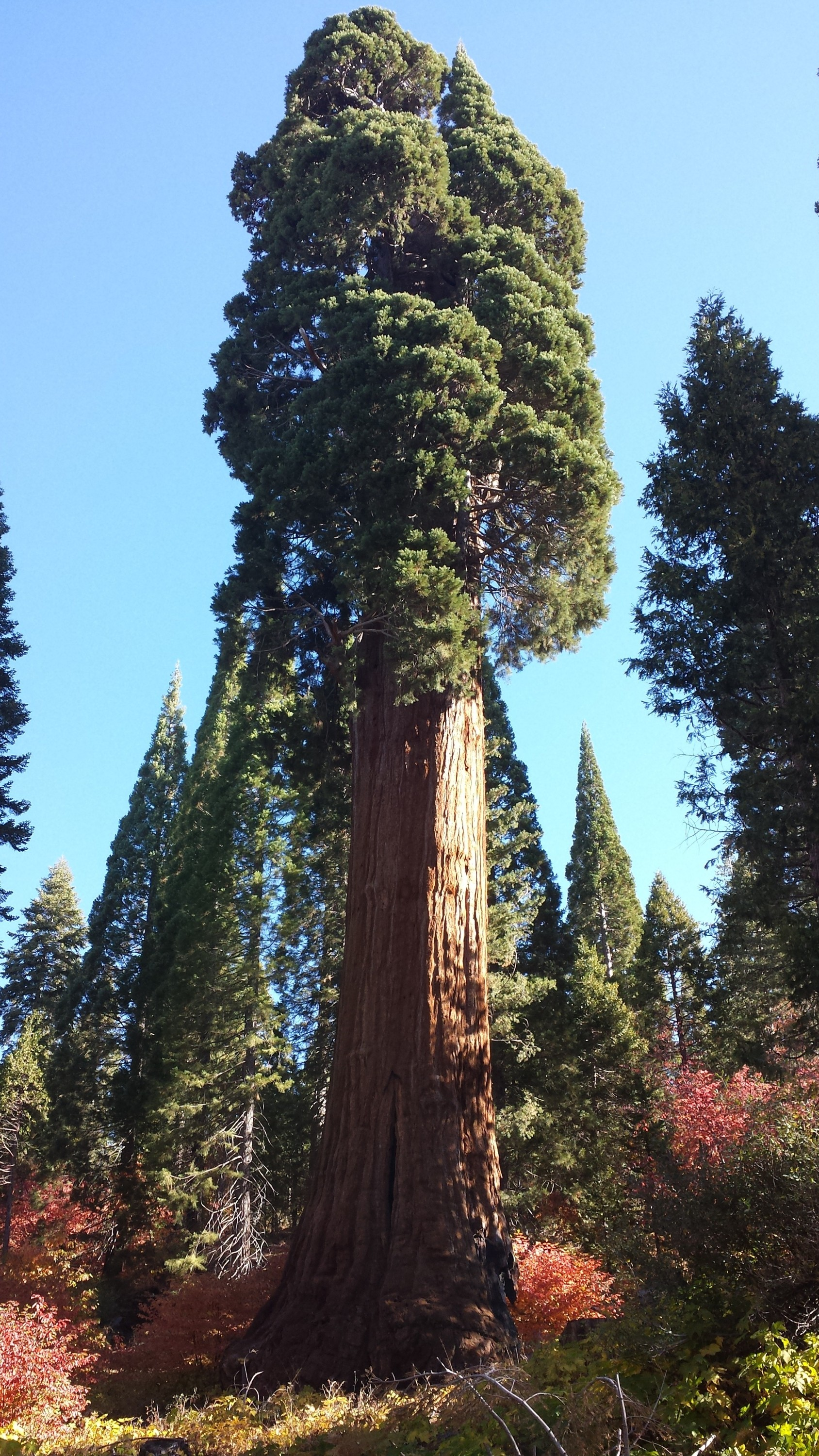
The Methuselah tree in the Mountain Home Grove is one of the largest Sequoia trees in the world.

The Methuselah Tree is a giant sequoia located in Mountain Home State Forest, a sequoia grove located in Sequoia National Forest in the Sierra Nevada in eastern California. It is the 28th largest giant sequoia in the world, and could be considered the 27th largest depending on how badly Ishi Giant atrophied during the Rough Fire in 2015.

The Methuselah Tree of the Mountain Home Grove is not to be confused with another Methuselah Tree in the White Mountains of eastern California that is a bristlecone pine (Pinus longaeva), which at one time was considered to be the oldest tree in the world.

== History ==
Jesse Hoskins, who about 1884 named many of the other trees in the Mountain Home Grove, also named the Methuselah tree, imagining that moss streamers hanging down from its bark were reminiscent of the beard of the biblical character Methusaleh, the oldest man in the world. The Methuselah Tree has a broken top and an unusually large diameter at its base, which rivals that of the better known Boole tree in the Converse Basin Grove.

== Dimensions ==
When the tree was measured in the 1950s it had a height of about 225 feet (68.6 m), but at some point prior to the 1980s the top was broken off, probably during a storm. This reduced the height to under 208 feet (63.4 m), but a new leader at the top has subsequently grown, and the height of the tree continues to increase. Wendell D. Flint in 1987 collected the dimension data given below, which provide a calculated volume that ignores burns.

	Metres	Feet
Height above base	63.3	207.8
Circumference at ground	29.2	95.8
Diameter at ground level	8.4	27.4
Diameter 5 ft (1.5 m) above ground	7.3	24.0
Estimated volume (m³.ft³)	931.5	32,897

In 2013 it was found to have 70.30 metres (230.6 ft) in tree height measurement.

== See also ==
- List of largest giant sequoias
- List of individual trees
