= Redwood Highway (disambiguation) =

Redwood Highway may refer to:

- U.S. Route 101 in California
- U.S. Route 199 in California and Oregon
- Redwood Highway (film), a 2013 American independent drama film

== See also ==
- Avenue of the Giants, California, U.S.
