= Hollow log (finance) =

In finance, a hollow log is a fund or account, often undisclosed or hidden through some accounting method, intended to hold assets in safekeeping for future use. The term may refer to either legal or illegal methods according to context.

== History ==
The term was coined in 1977 by David Hill, a lead figure of the "Ministerial Advisory Unit" in Premier Neville Wran's department. Coming to power in September 1976, the Wran Government found the State's finances in substantial debt. Hill identified numerous dormant accounts held by public departments such as the Electricity Commission and the Sydney Water Board, but not declared on their balance sheets (an accounting technique that was illegal for public companies). In the first 18 months, the MAU discovered $180 million "squirrelled away in hollow logs". Wran required that the departments in question spend the "hollow log" funds before additional taxation revenue would be directed to them. The discovery of the hollow logs proved critical to the government solving the State's financial woes without increasing taxes.

== Examples ==
- In 2002, the New South Wales treasurer Michael Egan was accused by some commentators of using a "hollow log" technique to reduce the apparent size of the state government's surplus, supposedly in an attempt to limit the extent of spending promises that the Liberal opposition could make in the leadup to the 2003 election.
- In 2004, the Federal Liberal government discovered $800 million in unclaimed superannuation of visiting overseas worker.
- In the lead-up to the 2010 Australian federal election, the Liberal Opposition budgeted $2.5 billion in savings taken from the budget's contingency reserve, leading to claims that this constituted raiding a "hollow log".
- In 2012, the Federal Labor government changed the law to give it access to unclaimed assets in superannuation, bank or insurance funds.
- In the lead-up to the 2015 Queensland state election, the incumbent Liberal government discovered over $1.3 billion in extra funding which it used to fund election promises; Labor's Shadow Treasurer Curtis Pitt accused the government of operating a "hollow log."
