= Hercules Tree =

Giant sequoia in the Mountain Home Grove, California

Coordinates: 36.238536°N 118.68408°W

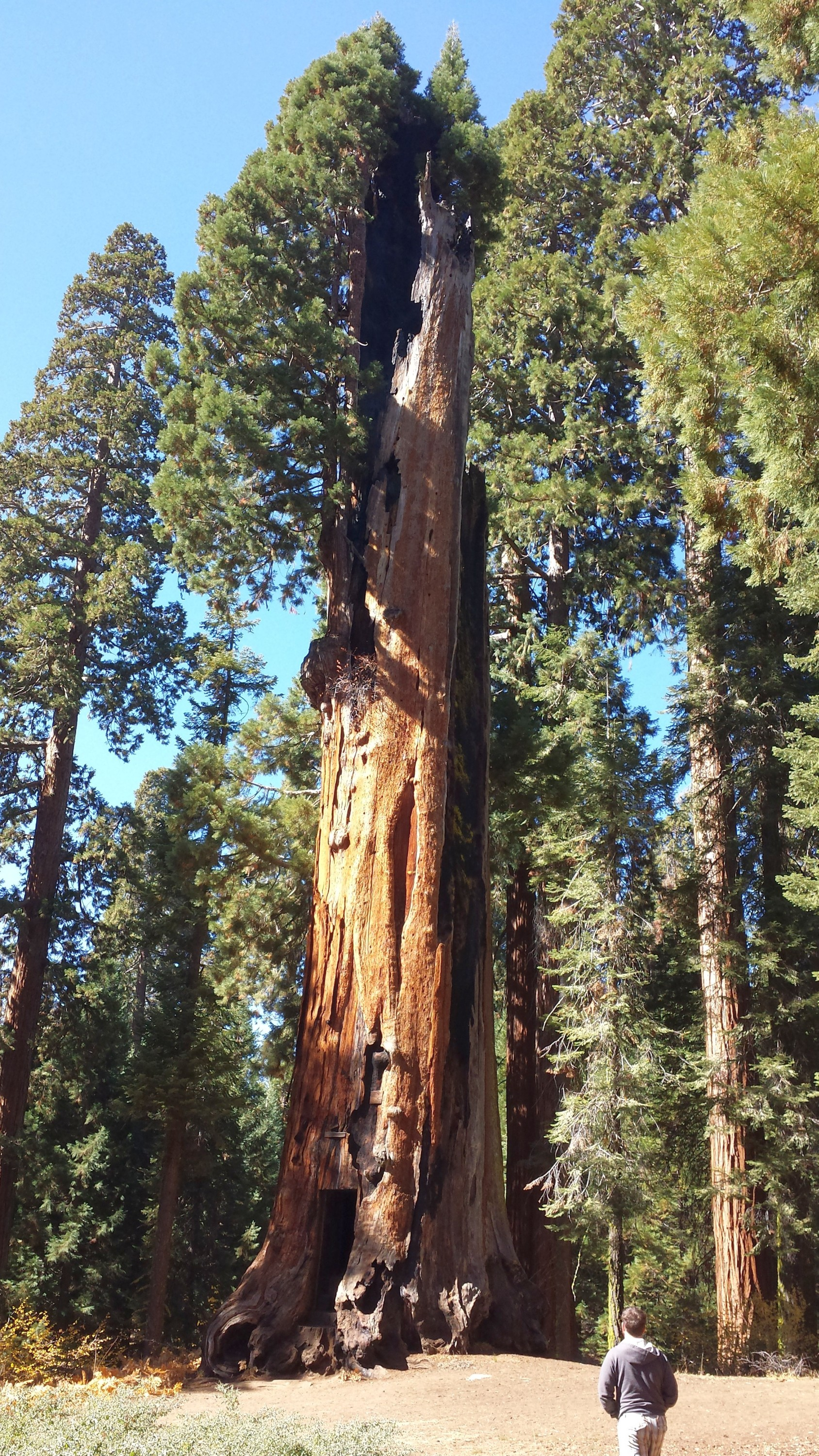
The Hercules Tree in the Mountain Home Grove has a large room cut into it.

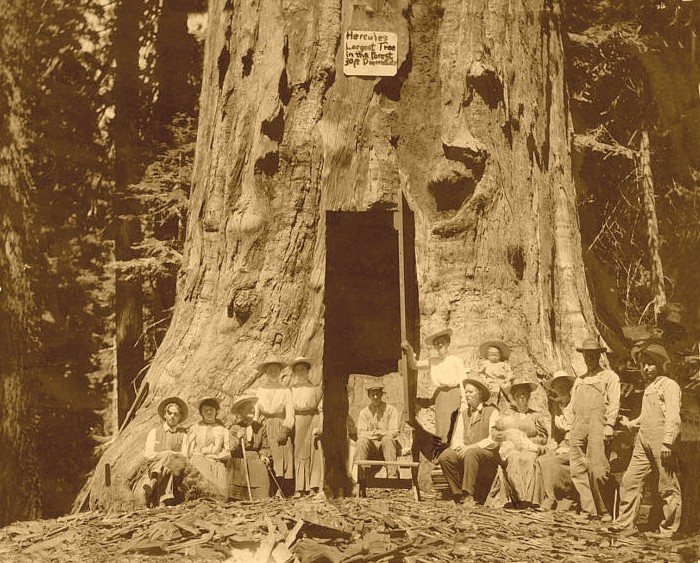
1902 photo of the entrance to Jesse Hoskins' Hercules Tree.

The Hercules Tree in the Mountain Home Grove of California is a living giant sequoia tree that has a room carved into the center of it. It is also known as the "Room Tree".

== History ==
A wealthy rancher from Lindsay, California, named Jesse Hoskins (1849–1908) in 1884 purchased an eighty-acre tract of giant sequoia trees in the southern Sierra Nevada from the United States government and named it Camp Lena. Hoskins, who spent his summers among the Camp Lena sequoias, chose biblical and classical themed names for the largest trees, and placed wooden name plates twenty feet off the ground on many of the better-known ones. After spending several summers studying one giant tree that he named the Hercules Tree, he decided that he could carve out the center of it without damaging the tree, and with the help of a Mr. Meyers between 1897 and 1902 he drilled and hand cut a 12 feet (3.7 m) diameter by 9 feet (2.7 m) high room, to which he added a hinged wooden door. Hoskins tried living in this room, but it leaked sap, so he made it into a gift shop where he sold redwood trinkets made of wood left over from carving out the room.

The Camp Lena tract remained in Hoskins' family until 1913, when it was sold. Although timber sales in 1956 resulted in some logging that was condemned by the Sierra Club, the Hercules Tree and various other large redwoods in the immediate vicinity were exempted. The Hercules Tree was protected for all time in 1977 when the Camp Lena tract was purchased by the State of California and incorporated into the Mountain Home State Demonstration Forest. A fire started by a cigarette butt on 4 September 1984 did cause some damage to the tree, and the door and Hoskins' name plate have since been stolen, but otherwise the tree is still standing, and the room can still be entered.

== See also ==
- Mountain Home Grove
- List of individual trees
