= Adam Tree =

Giant sequoia in California, United States

Coordinates: 36.243404°N 118.672651°W

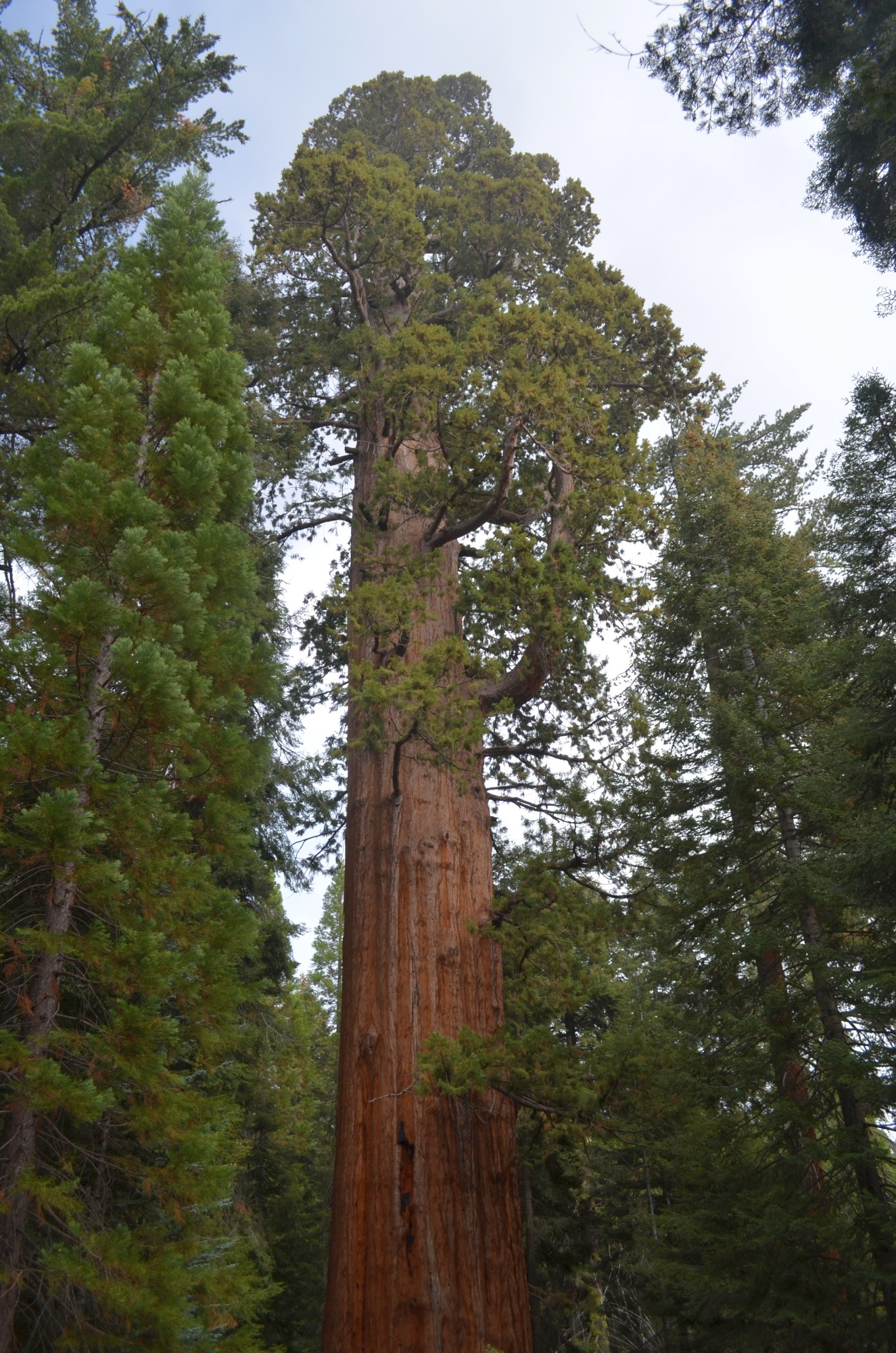
The Adam Tree in the Mountain Home Grove

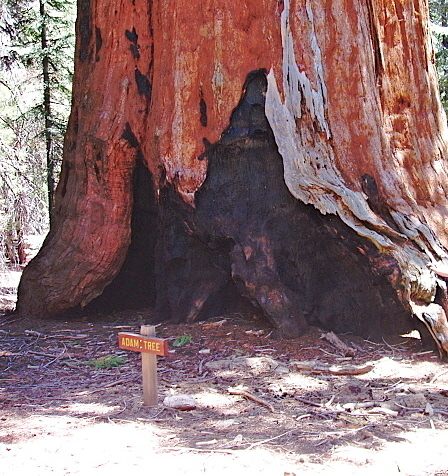
The base of the Adam Tree

The Adam Tree is a giant sequoia located in Mountain Home Grove, a sequoia grove in Giant Sequoia National Monument in the Sierra Nevada of California. It is the 21st largest giant sequoia in the world, and could be considered the 20th largest depending on how badly Ishi Giant atrophied during the Rough Fire in 2015.

== Description ==
The Adam Tree was named around 1884 by Jesse Hoskins, who was also responsible for the room cut out of the Hercules tree, which is also in the Mountain Home Grove. Wendell Flint and Mike Law measured the Adam Tree in 1978 and calculated a volume of 35,017 cubic feet (991.6 m^{3}), with a girth of 95 feet (29.0 m). It was considered the largest tree in the grove until 1985, when Flint, with the help of photographer Mike Law, measured and named the nearby Genesis Tree and demonstrated that it was larger. Three trees in the grove – the Genesis, Summit Road and Euclid trees – are presently considered to be larger than the Adam Tree.

== Dimensions ==
The dimensions of the Adam Tree as measured by Wendell D. Flint. The calculated volume ignores burns.

	Metres	Feet
Height above base	75.4	247.4
Circumference at ground	28.71	94.2
Diameter 5 ft (1.5 m) above ground	7.01	23.0
Diameter 60 ft (18.3 m) above ground	4.94	16.2
Diameter 120 ft (36.6 m) above ground	4.15	13.6
Diameter 180 ft (54.9 m) above ground	2.13	7.0
Estimated volume (m^{3}.ft^{3})	991.6	35,017

== See also ==
- List of largest giant sequoias
- List of individual trees
- Mountain Home Grove
