= Mary and Conrad Buff =

American children's book writer and illustrator duo

- Writing career
- Period: 1937–1968 (children's books)
- Notable works: Big Tree; The Apple and the Arrow; Magic Maize

Mary Buff
- Born: Mary Marsh; April 10, 1890; Cincinnati, Ohio, USA
- Died: November 30, 1970 (aged 80)

Conrad Buff
- Born: August 31, 1886; Speicher, Switzerland
- Died: March 11, 1975 (aged 88)

Mary Buff (April 10, 1890 – November 30, 1970) and Conrad Buff II (August 31, 1886 – March 11, 1975) were married creators of illustrated children's books. Between 1937 and 1968, they collaborated on both text and illustrations (Note: While it may be taken for granted that Mary and Conrad Buff collaborated as writer and illustrator, they were credited simply as "Mary and Conrad Buff" for the books they created after 1939. The Newbery and Caldecott Medals are conferred for writing and illustration, respectively. Since 1970, ALSC has annually designated a few Caldecott and Newbery "Honor Books", which are authorized to display silver Honor seals on their front covers. In retrospect, the cited books by runners-up for earlier Medals are also Honor Books that may display seals.) to produce 14 books; they were runner-up for the Caldecott Medal in 1943 and received three Newbery Honors (1947, 1952, and 1954.) They had a profound impact on children's literature in the mid-20th century.

== Conrad Buff ==
Conrad Buff II was born in the village of Speicher, Switzerland. Buff followed in his father's footsteps and developed an interest in sketching art at an early age. In 1900, at the age of 14, Buff enrolled in the School of Arts and Crafts in St. Gallen. By 1903, Buff was running out of money and felt that art school was not for him; the next year, he decided to leave Switzerland and head to America in hopes of a more inspiring lifestyle. As Buff was traveling West through America, he held several different jobs, including painting, shepherding, washing dishes, and baking.

By 1907, Conrad Buff had arrived in Los Angeles with no assets to his name and began to earn an income by painting houses. At that time, Buff was able to purchase a piece of land and continued to paint in his free time. Between 1910 and 1913, he attended the Art Students League of Los Angeles, but again, he was not fulfilled with the institution. He then attended night classes at Los Angeles High School, where he painted a series of small oil portraits that were never shown publicly but were unlike anything seen at the time. Buff continued painting landscape paintings, which were very popular at this time in California.

In the 1920s, Buff's art became admired, and he began winning prizes for his work. In 1922, Conrad Buff was married to Mary Jordan Marsh, with whom he later had two sons. Mary and Conrad Buff together wrote and illustrated children's books from 1937 to 1968.

The Buffs lived in Pasadena and in Laguna Hills, California, where Conrad died on March 11, 1975.

== Mary Buff ==
Mary Buff, formerly known as Mary Marsh, was born in Cincinnati, Ohio on April 10, 1890. Mary had an early interest in arts and poetry but only continued to study art. She studied at the Chicago Academy of Fine Arts and at the Cincinnati Art Academy and received her bachelor's degree in Kansas at Bethany College. Mary then lived in Albion, Idaho and in the 1920s settled in Los Angeles.

In 1922 she married Conrad Buff. Mary was the assistant curator at the Los Angeles County Museum of Art. Her income was sufficient to enable her husband, Conrad Buff, to paint full-time. After marrying Conrad Buff, Mary gave up her pursuit of painting to write children's books with him. She died on November 30, 1970.

Mary Buff was a teacher in Montana, Idaho, and Hollywood prior to being an author. She was also an artist and the assistant curator at the Los Angeles County Museum of Art when she married Conrad Buff in 1922. In 1936, Mary Buff began writing books and published 14 books with her husband.

Mary died on November 30, 1970.

== Career ==
Conrad Buff's earliest artwork traces back to small landscape oil paintings that were sold for 50 cents each in 1905. Throughout the 1910s, Buff began to use a cross-hatching technique, similar to the broken brush stroke. His paintings became abstract; some areas of the paintings were defined, while others were rough and less detailed. His style differed from that of other landscape painters, as he did not paint the settings with the same level of accuracy, and his paintings were not exact representations of the landscapes he was interpreting.

From the 1920s to the 1930s, Buff began painting murals. These were murals of architectural buildings and large spaces. During this time, some of the murals he produced included the Southern California Edison Company building in Los Angeles, the First National Bank of Phoenix, the William Penn Hotel in Whittier, and the Guarantee Building and Loan Association in Los Angeles. In the 1930s, Buff painted several lithographs, copies of other paintings. His work won many awards in exhibitions. By 1936, Conrad Buff started illustrating children's books with his wife Mary Buff. Conrad Buff continued illustrating until 1968, creating several books during this time period.

== Influences ==
The body of work produced by Mary and Conrad Buff has nature as a recurrent theme. Stories in the books they have written and illustrated, such as Dash & Dart and Forest Folk, feature nature as the primary focus. Numerous oil paintings by Conrad Buff are of landscapes, of which include a notable landscape portrait titled "Canyon Land." This painting was sold at auction for $77,000 in 2003. The landscape portraits created by Buff where distinct from those of his peers, as he used a cross-hatching technique along with pointillist style.

== Notable works ==
Mary and Conrad Buff worked together to publish 14 books in total. Mary was the story teller and mainly wrote the stories where Conrad used his creative hand to illustrate the books. Their second Switzerland book The Apple and the Arrow (1951) is a version of the legend of William Tell. It is suggested for Grade 4 readers and used in schools throughout Canada today. It was a Newbery runner-up in 1952.

== Books by Mary and Conrad Buff ==
The Buffs collaborated on 14 titles and a revised edition of their first book. The Library of Congress catalog distinguishes their contributions for the first two books only.

- Dancing Cloud: the Navajo boy (The Viking Press, 1937), by Mary Marsh Buff with lithographs by Conrad Buff
- Kobi, a boy of Switzerland (Viking, 1939), by Mary Marsh Buff and Conrad Buff; lithographs by Conrad Buff
- Dash & Dart (Viking, 1942), by Mary and Conrad Buff
- Big Tree (Viking, 1946)
- Peter's Pinto, a story of Utah (Viking, 1949)
- The Apple and the Arrow (Houghton Mifflin, 1951) — a version of the William Tell legend
- Magic Maize (Houghton Mifflin, 1953)
- Hurry, Skurry, & Flurry (Viking, 1954)
- Hah-nee to the cliff dwellers (HM, 1956)
- Dancing Cloud, the Navajo boy (Viking, 1957), revised edition with new illustrations by Conrad Buff
- Elf Owl (Viking, 1958)
- Trix and Vix (HM, 1960)
- Forest folk (Viking, 1962)
- Kemi, an Indian boy before the white man came (Los Angeles: Ward Ritchie Press, 1966)
- Colorado, river of mystery (Ritchie, 1968)

== Cultural impact ==
Mary and Conrad Buff have been recognized as significant contributors to American children's literature. Several times they were among the runners-up for a Caldecott Medal or a Newbery Medal from the professional librarians, the most prestigious American children's book awards. The Caldecott Medal recognizes the illustrator of the previous year's "most distinguished American picture book for children"; they were runners-up for Dash and Dart in 1943. The Newbery Medal recognizes the writer of the "most distinguished contribution to American literature for children"; the Buffs were runners-up for Big Tree in 1947, The Apple and the Arrow in 1952, and Magic Maize in 1954.

Conrad Buff left his mark on more than just the world of children's literature, as he was commissioned to paint architectural murals in Los Angeles and Phoenix.

== Archival collections ==
When the de Grummond Children's Literature Collection was established at Southern Mississippi in 1966, the Buffs contributed a small collection. Their primary archive is at the University of California, Irvine.
