= Magic Maize =

- First edition (publ. Houghton Mifflin)
- Author: Mary Buff, Conrad Buff II
- Language: English
- Publisher: Houghton Mifflin
- Publication date: 1953
- OCLC: 290951
- LC Class: PZ9.B84 Mag

Magic Maize is a children's novella written and illustrated by Mary and Conrad Buff. Set in contemporary Guatemala, it describes the life and adventures of a boy from a traditional Mayan Indian family. First published in 1953, it was a Newbery Honor recipient in 1954.
