= The Apple and the Arrow =

Novel

First edition

The Apple and the Arrow is a children's novella written and illustrated by Mary and Conrad Buff, published by Houghton Mifflin in 1951. It retells the legend of William Tell from the viewpoint of his 12-year-old son Walter. It is set in 1291, during the political upheaval that led to the foundation of the Old Swiss Confederacy.

The Buffs were one runner-up for the 1952 Newbery Medal from the American Library Association, recognizing the previous year's "most distinguished contribution to American literature for children". The Apple and the Arrow is called a Newbery Honor Book in retrospect and may display a silver seal.
