= Hollow Log (Balch Park) =

Historic deceased giant sequoia

Coordinates: 36.220404°N 118.679318°W

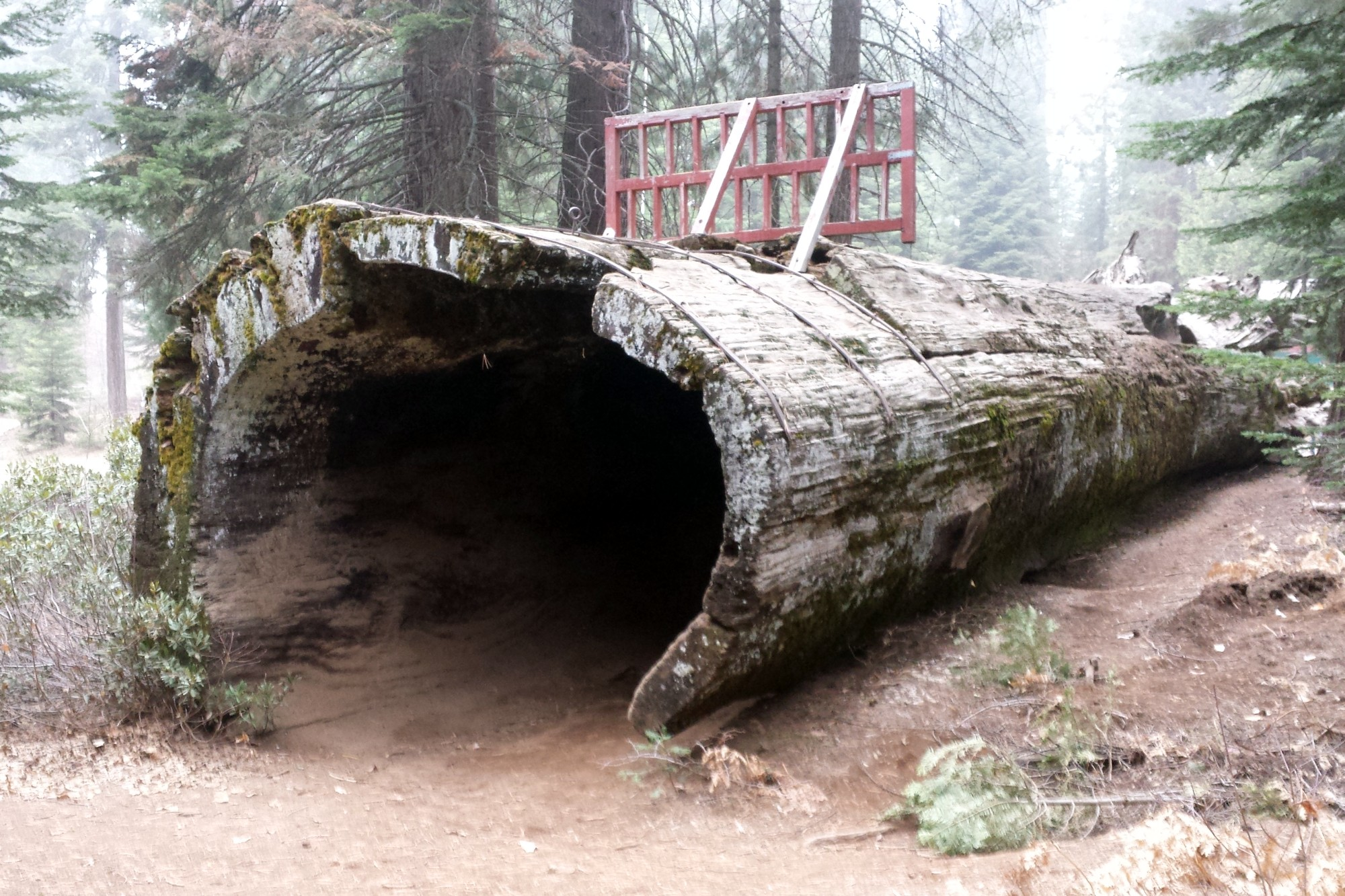
The Hollow Log is one of the best known features of Balch County Park and the Mountain Home Sequoia Grove.

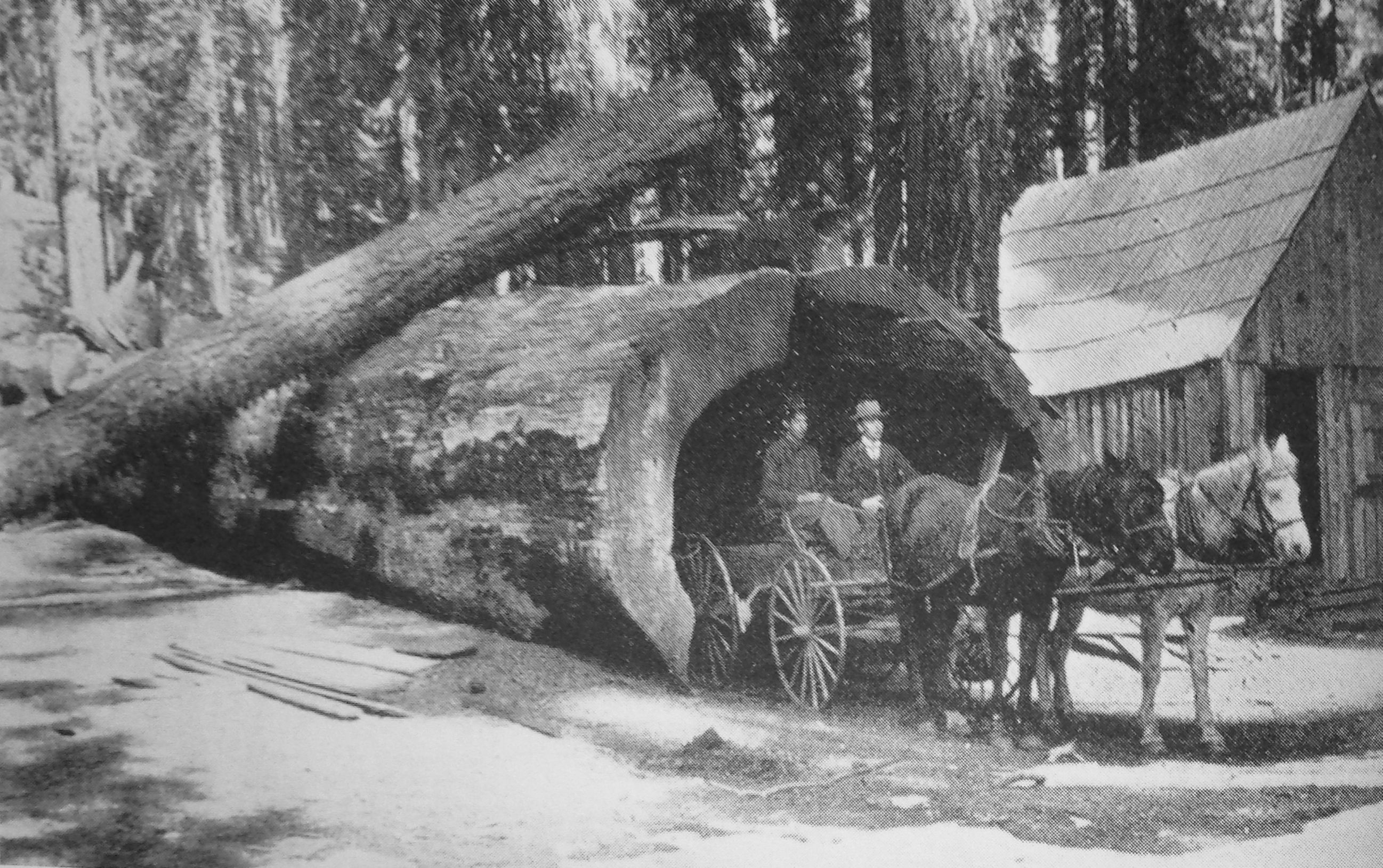
A horse and wagon parked inside the Hollow Log shown in a turn-of-the century photograph.

The Hollow Log of Balch Park is the naturally hollowed out log of a fallen Giant Sequoia tree. It is also one of the best known features of the Mountain Home Grove, a stand of Giant Sequoia trees that surrounds Balch Park in Tulare County, California.

== History ==
The Hollow Log was known to early Native Americans who frequented the Tule River watershed, but its first recorded mention is in 1856 when soldiers used it as a headquarters for patrols hunting Indian renegades during the Tule River Indian War. Known for many years as the "Soldiers Log", it was a popular destination for settlers visiting the surrounding grove of Giant Sequoia trees. Among these early visitors was a local sheep farmer named Clinton T. Brown, who carved his initials and the date 1870 on the log.

The log was part of a 160-acre (65 ha) parcel of land that John J. Doyle in 1885 acquired, with plans to make the area into a resort to be called "Summer Home." He first used the log as a dwelling, and then as a fruit cellar for an apple orchard that he planted a few miles away. Doyle next had the rough end of the log sawed off in 1888 so that the rest of the log could be moved to a railroad siding and mounted on wheels to be used as a railroad dining car for a promotion tour to the eastern United States. However, the log was spared when measurements revealed that it was too large fit through the railroad tunnels on the planned journey. Ultimately Dole's Hollow Log became the center attraction for his Summer Home resort, which for a few years was a popular tourist destination. Doyle's fortunes waned in later years, and he sold his property, along with the log and surrounding grove, in 1906 to the Mt. Whitney Power Company. The land eventually passed to Allan and Janet Balch, who in 1930 donated the property to Tulare County for a park, so that the Hollow Log and nearby Giant Sequoia trees would be preserved for future generations.

== Dimensions ==
The Hollow Log is about 75 feet (22.9 m) long with a diameter of 15 feet (4.6 m). It originally was longer, but in 1888 the end was sawed off. Although steel cables are bound around the log to prevent it from collapsing, it is still possible to walk and crawl all the way through it from one end to the other.

== See also ==
- Balch Park
- Mountain Home Grove
- List of individual trees
