= Mountain Home Grove =

Giant sequoia grove in Tulare County, California, United States

- Location within the United States
- Location: Giant Sequoia National Monument (Tulare County)
- Nearest city: Springville, CA
- Coordinates: 36°14′24″N 118°40′18″W
- Area: 4,800 acres (19.4 km^{2})
- Elevation: 6,460 ft (1,970 m)
- Governing body: U.S. Forest Service, Mountain Home State Forest, and Balch County Park

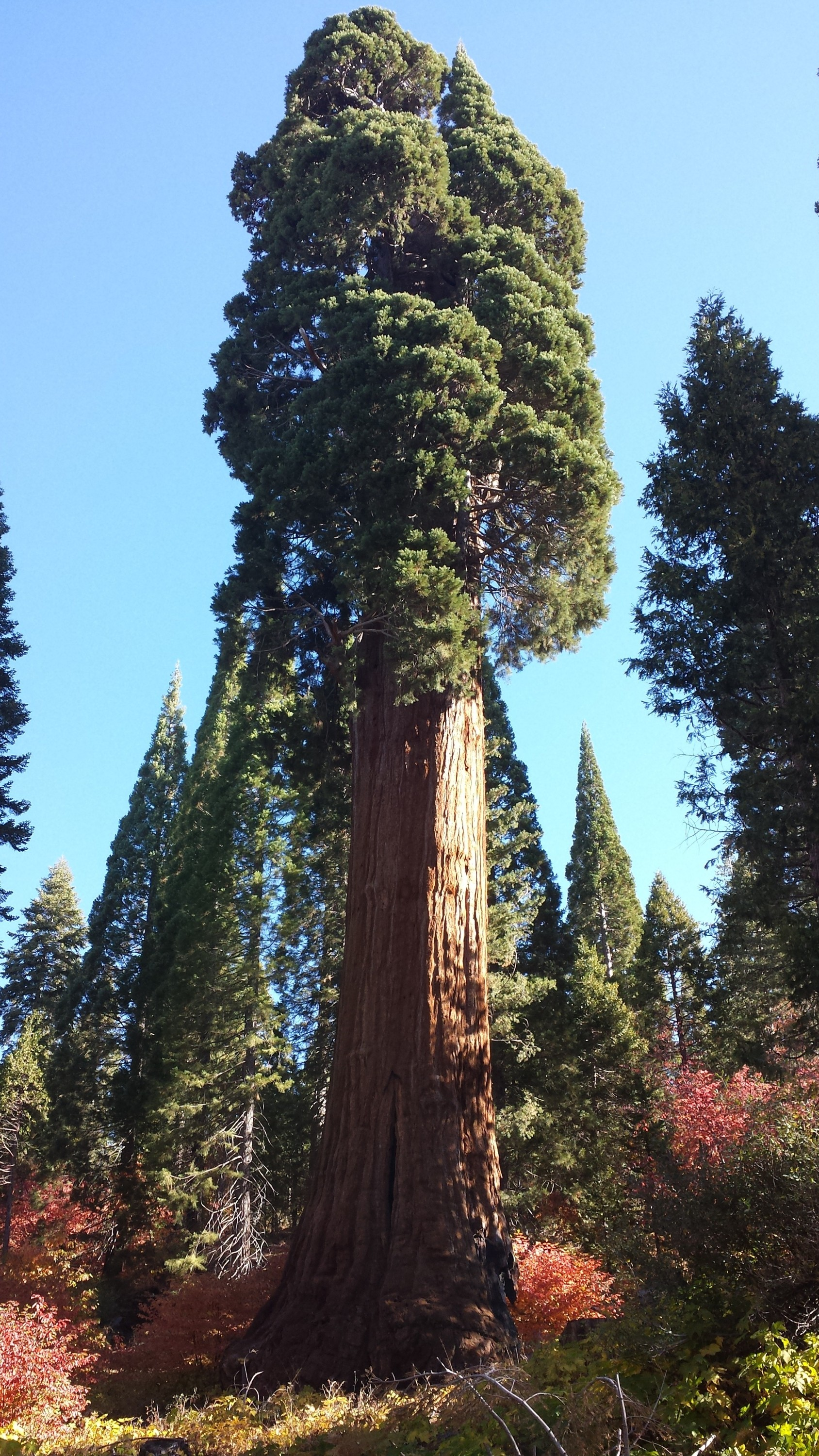
The Methuselah tree in the Mountain Home Grove is one of the largest Sequoia trees in the world.

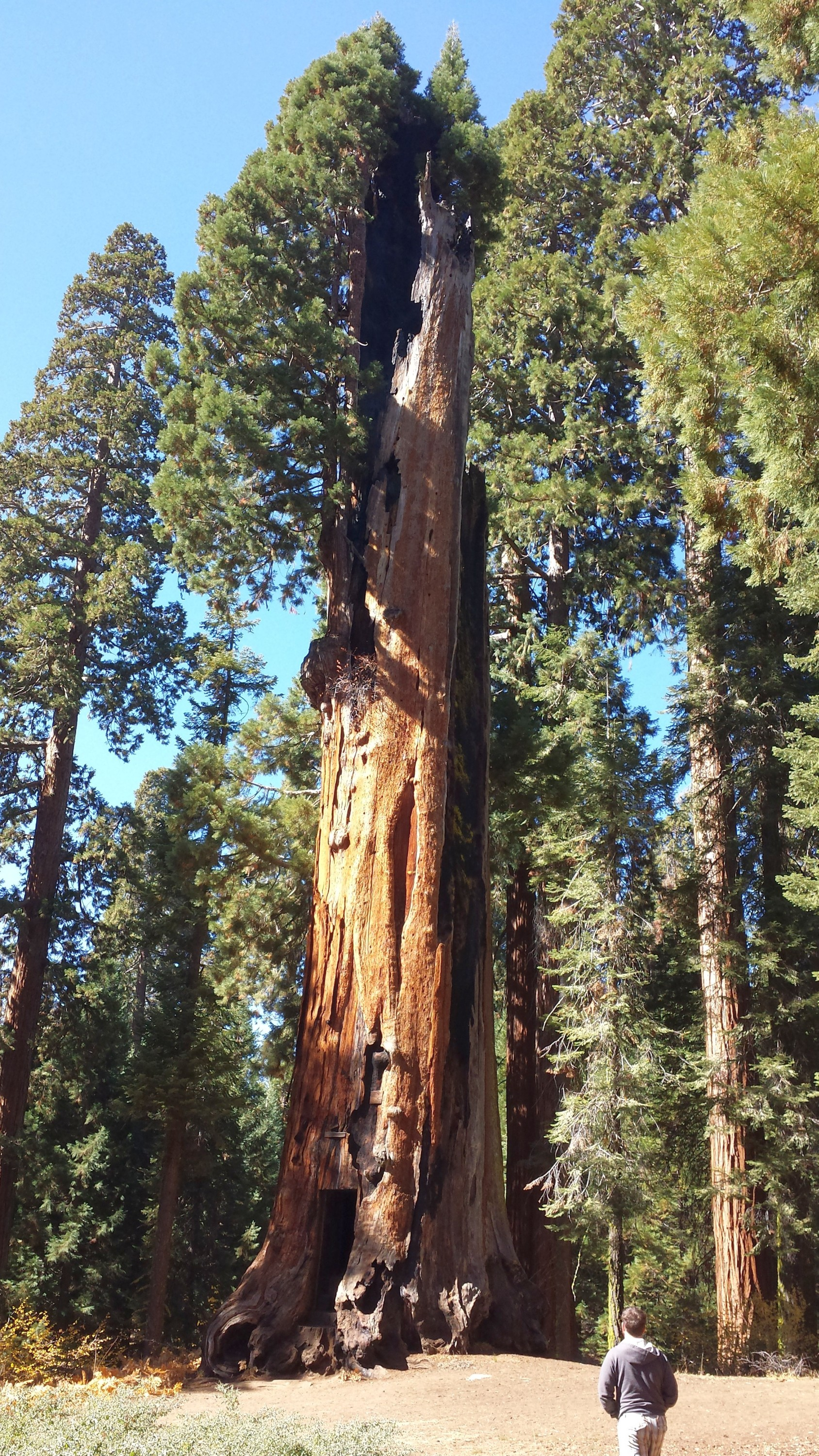
The Hercules tree in the Mountain Home Grove has a large room cut into it.

Mountain Home Grove is a grove of giant sequoia trees located in the southern part of the Sierra Nevada Mountains of California, and includes some of the largest trees in the world.

== Description ==
Mountain Home Grove is located partly in Balch Park, which is administered by Tulare County, California, partly in the Mountain Home Demonstration State Forest (MHDSF), and partly in Giant Sequoia National Monument, which was formerly in Sequoia National Forest. The grove includes four of the 20 largest giant sequoia trees (by volume), as well as several other notable trees. This makes Mountain Home the second largest grove of sequoias. Only the Giant Forest in Sequoia National Park is larger. Because of easy access from the cities of Fresno and Porterville, and far fewer visitors than in the groves in Yosemite, Kings Canyon and Sequoia national parks, the Mountain Home Grove is considered one of the best places to see giant sequoias.

== History ==
John Muir in some words he wrote in 1875 on Yosemite, but did not publish until 1890, described the sequoia groves in the upper drainage of the north fork of the Tule River (i.e., the Mountain Home Grove) as "the finest block of Sequoia in the entire belt". Nonetheless, logging began here in the 1870s, and in the next few years many of the big trees were felled, including the Centennial tree, which many at the time believed to be the largest tree on earth. Fortunately, pioneers John Doyle and Jesse Hoskins in the 1880s acquired separate tracts of land in the heart of these big trees, Doyle for a time operating a resort here that he called "Summer Home", and Hoskins simply hoping to save the big trees from being cut down. Another entrepreneur, Andrew Jackson Doty, with his wife Sarah built just outside the grove, not far from Hoskins' and Doyle's trees, a popular hotel that they named "Mountain Home", and this is the name by which the grove came to be known.

Whereas many trees in the Mountain Home Grove were logged, those on the Doyle and Hoskins tracts were saved. Today Doyle's "Summer Home" is part of Balch Park, a Tulare County Park; and much of the surrounding forest, including Hoskins' stand of trees, are part of a California State conservation project known as the Mountain Home State Demonstration Forest. Although logging continued until 1956 in the unprotected parts of the grove, there has been no significant tree cutting since, except to mitigate fire danger and to protect the largest trees. The Mountain Home Grove on 15 April 2000 became part of the newly created Giant Sequoia National Monument, under the management of the U.S. Forest Service, with Balch Park continuing under jurisdiction of Tulare County, and the State Demonstration Forest remaining under control of the State of California.

Hoskins and Doyle identified and named many of the big trees in the Mountain Home Grove, but a century later retired mathematics teacher Wendell Flint, with the help of photographer Mike Law, began searching for large sequoias that the early tree hunters had overlooked. They discovered, and subsequently measured and named, several sequoias that are now considered to be among the largest living trees on earth, including three trees in the Mountain Home Grove that are now included in the top forty largest trees in terms of volume.

Many trees in the grove were destroyed or damaged by the Castle Fire in 2020. It is estimated that between 31% and 42% of giant sequoias were destroyed in groves affected by the Castle Fire.

== Noteworthy trees ==
Some of the noteworthy trees in Mountain Home Grove are listed below.

- Adam Tree: The 20th largest tree in the world. It was considered the largest tree in the Mountain Home Grove before Wendell Flint in the 1980s began looking for "big trees."
  36.243404°N 118.672651°W
- Centennial Stump: Although said to be the largest tree in the world before it was cut down for an 1878 Centennial exhibition, recent measurements of the remaining stump show this to be an exaggeration. Nevertheless, a diameter of 24 feet (7.3 m) and circumference of 86.9 feet (26.5 m) on top of the stump indicate that if this tree were alive and standing today it would be one of the "big ones."
  36.240254°N 118.680249°W
- Euclid Tree: The 16th largest tree in the world. It was identified as being a large tree in 1989 by Wendell Flint. This tree is quite tall at 273 feet (83.2 m) for a giant sequoia, as the tops of most of the biggest trees have been damaged, and their heights reduced by lightning strikes.
- Genesis Tree: The 7th largest tree in the world before the Castle Fire, which caused damage to the tree. It was discovered in 1985, by Wendell Flint, co-author of the book To Find the Biggest Tree.
  36.215119°N 118.669395°W.
- Great Bonsai Tree: This tree is described by Wendell Flint as "one of the greatest sequoia sights to be seen anywhere", due to several large limbs that reach close to the ground, and a commanding position of the tree on top of a pile of boulders. The tree was killed in the Castle Fire and burned for more than a year.
  36.218480°N 118.66822°W
- Hercules Tree: Jesse Hoskins in the 1890s carved into the center of this tree a 12 feet (3.7 m) diameter by 9 feet (2.7 m) high room that the public can still enter and enjoy. Despite this room cut into its center, and the top of the tree having been burned by an ancient lightning strike, the Hercules tree is still alive and growing.
  36.238536°N 118.68408°W
- Hollow Log: A naturally hollowed out log of a fallen giant sequoia, it was used as a shelter as early as 1856, and today is one of the main attractions of Balch County Park.
  36.220404°N 118.679318°W
- Methuselah Tree: The 27th largest tree in the world. This sequoia with a broken top has an unusually large diameter at the base, which rivals that of the better-known Boole tree in the Converse Basin Grove.
  36.207319°N 118.684217°W
- Summit Road Tree: The 15th largest tree in the world is another big tree identified by Wendell Flint. The tree was damaged in the Castle Fire.

== See also ==
- Balch Park
- List of giant sequoia groves
- List of largest giant sequoias
- List of individual trees
