= Tuolumne Grove =

Giant sequoia grove in Yosemite National Park, California, United States

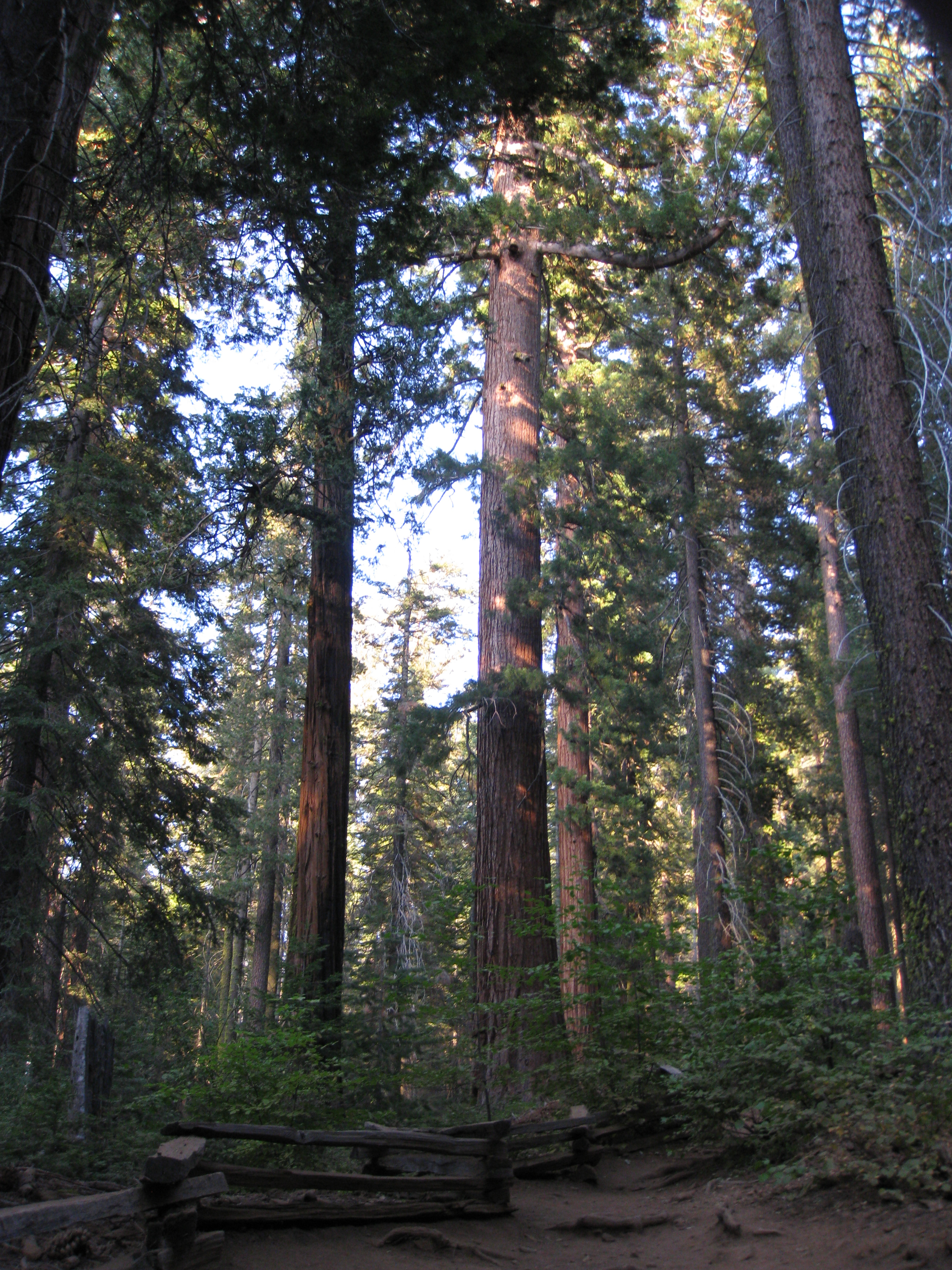
- Tuolumne Grove

- Location within California
- Interactive map of Tuolumne Grove

Geography
- Location: Tuolumne County, California, United States
- Coordinates: 37°46′09″N 119°48′36″W
- Elevation: 5,600–5,900 ft (1,700–1,800 m)

Ecology
- Dominant tree species: Sequoiadendron giganteum

Tuolumne Grove is a giant sequoia grove located near Crane Flat in Yosemite National Park, at the southeastern edge of the Tuolumne River watershed. It is about 16 miles (26 km) west of Yosemite Village on Tioga Pass Road. The grove contains many conifers, including a few Sequoiadendron giganteum as well as Abies concolor and Pinus lambertiana.

A small grove of about 25 large trees, covering around 20 acres, includes the Dead Giant, which measures 29 1/2 feet in diameter at its base. In 1878, a tunnel was cut through the Dead Giant, allowing a road to pass through it. The Dead Giant was the first tunnel tree.

== Discovery and Early Exploration ==
Tuolumne Grove lies near Crane Flat in Yosemite and contains about two dozen mature giant sequoias.

Although likely first observed by the Joseph Walker Expedition in 1833, Tuolumne Grove was officially discovered on May 10, 1858, by Dr. J. L. Cogswell and eight companions from Garrote, California. They named the hollow giant tree "King Solomon’s Temple," later known as the Dead Giant. The party, initially hunting near Crane Flat, accidentally discovered a cluster of sequoias after losing track of a wounded deer. Cogswell's report in the San Francisco Evening Bulletin soon made Tuolumne Grove a popular stop for Yosemite visitors.

== Early Tourism and Access ==
By the late 19th century, Tuolumne Grove was promoted as a scenic stop on the overland routes into Yosemite. Stage and wagon roads connected Big Oak Flat (Groveland) to Yosemite Valley via Crane Flat, deliberately routing travelers through the Tuolumne Grove of “mammoth trees.” Newspaper advertisements and travel guides from the 1860s–1880s advertised this route as a pleasant ride "down the Tuolumne grove of big trees." As tourism grew, the old Big Oak Flat Road (later known as Old Tioga Road) became one of the first carriage routes into the park.

In 1882–1883, the trail through the grove was improved to a wagon road. By 1917, the historic Old Big Oak Flat Road was realigned and paved for automobiles, though an original segment (the "Old Tioga Road") still leads hikers and snowshoers into the grove.

== Dead Giant Tunnel Tree (1878) ==
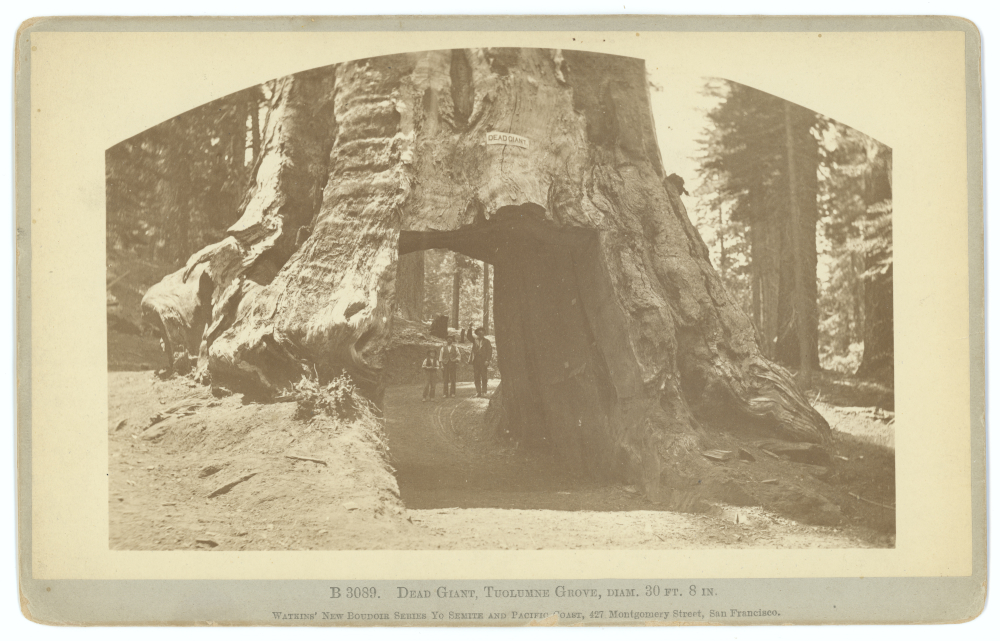
The Dead Giant photographed by Carleton Watkins.

In 1878, William McCarthy and brothers James J. and Dave Lumsden cut a 12-foot-high tunnel through the trunk of the burned-out Dead Giant stump so that stages and wagons could pass. According to contemporaries, this was the first giant sequoia tunnel tree. The tunnel (about 30 feet in diameter) was completed just before June 1878, and stagecoaches regularly traversed it as they shuttled tourists between Crane Flat and Yosemite Valley.

== Conservation and Park History ==
Tuolumne Grove has been part of Yosemite’s protected lands since the park’s creation. In 1864, Congress granted Yosemite Valley and the Mariposa Grove to California for preservation, and in 1890 Yosemite was established as a national park by federal law. This 1890 act greatly expanded the park’s boundaries to include much of the upper Tuolumne River watershed (encompassing the grove). The grove thereafter fell under park administration.

In the early 20th century, the U.S. Army (and later the National Park Service) managed Yosemite, maintaining trails and removing fallen logs to protect the trees and reduce fire risk. Over time, fire suppression policies and later prescribed burning were applied to help sustain the sequoias.

On July 19, 2025, Angela Lin was fatally injured by a falling tree branch while hiking on an established trail in Tuolumne Grove.

== Gallery ==
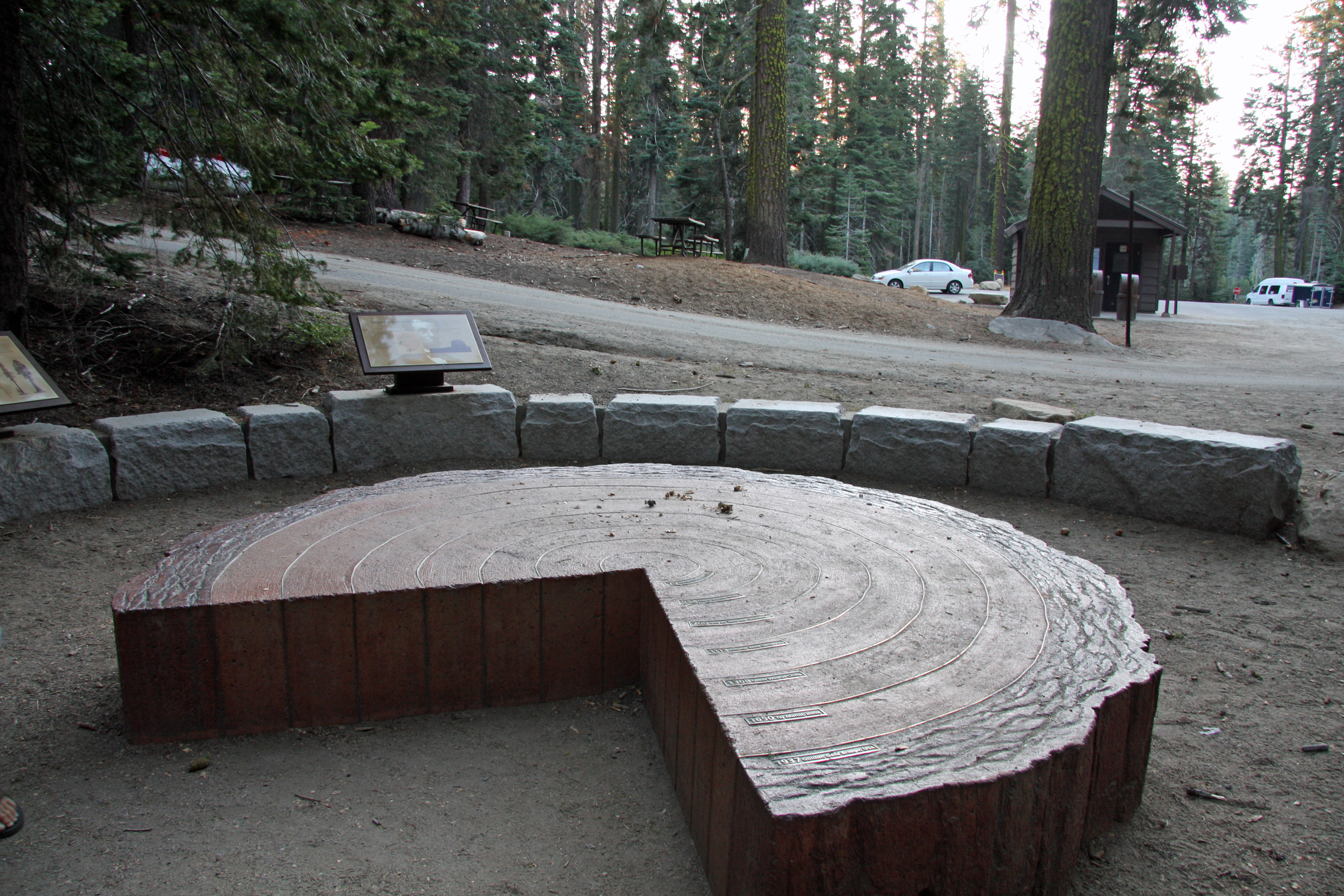
Tuolumne Grove Trailhead

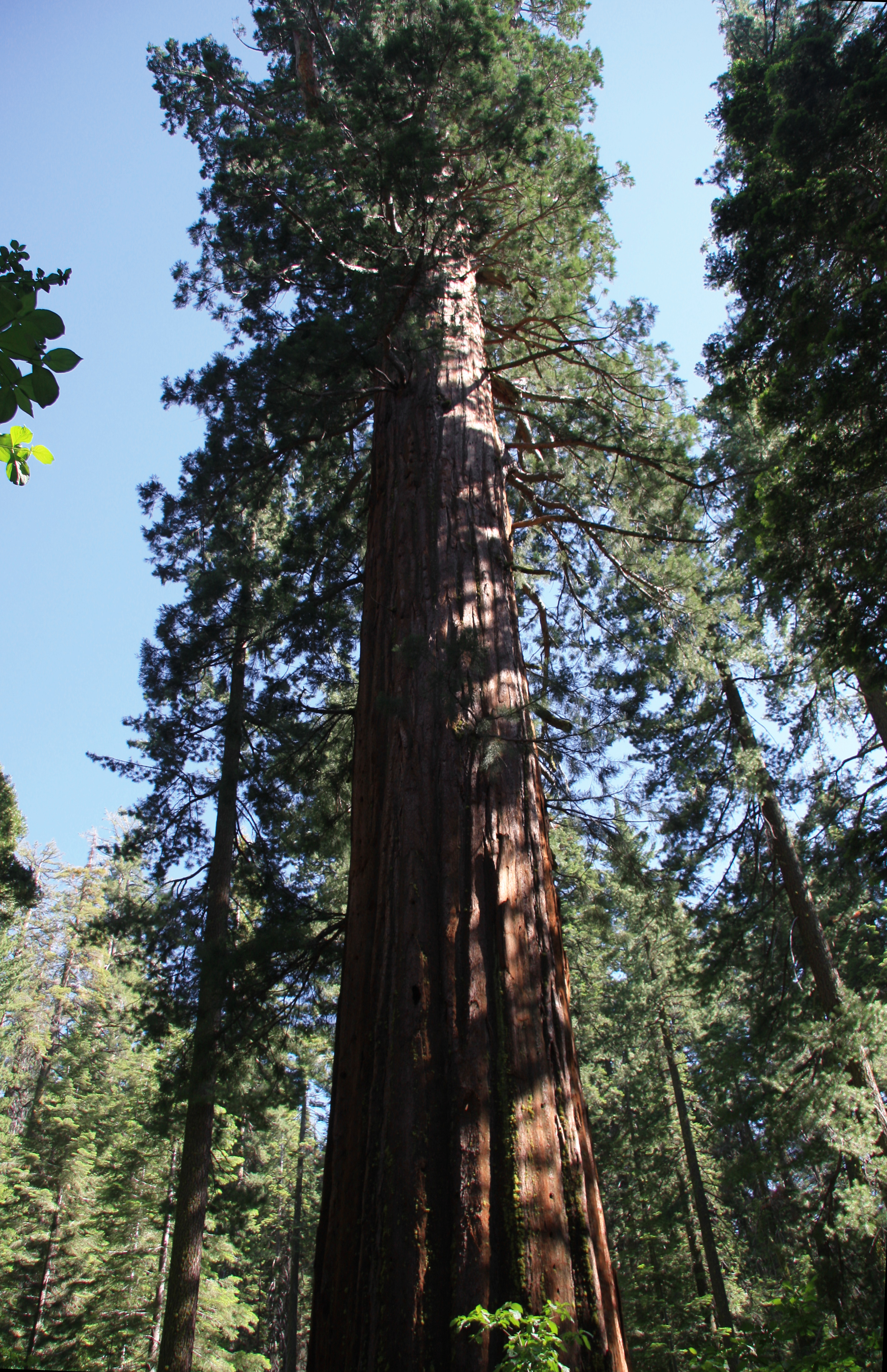
The largest tree in Tuolumne Grove

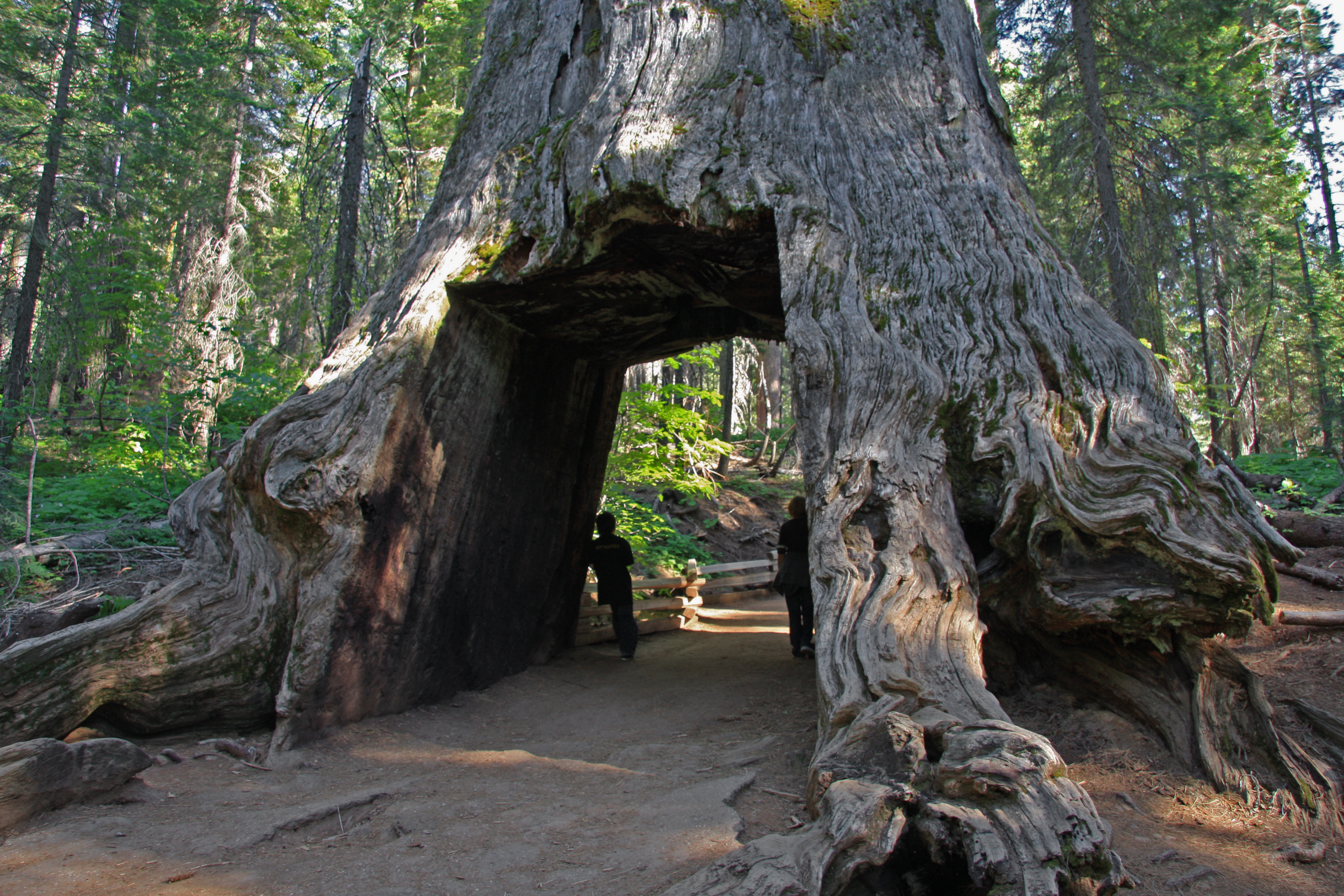
The Dead Giant

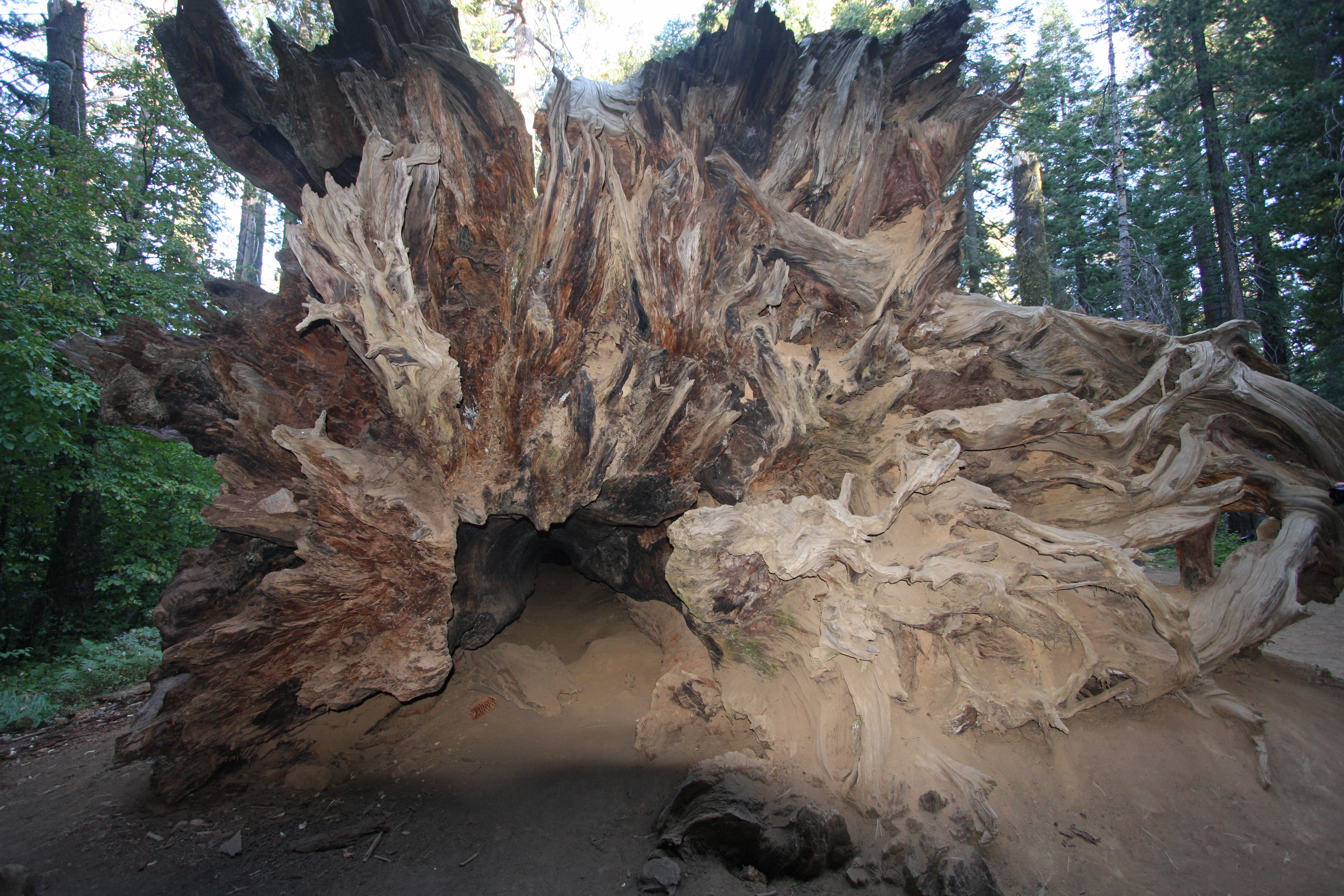
The roots of a fallen giant sequoia.

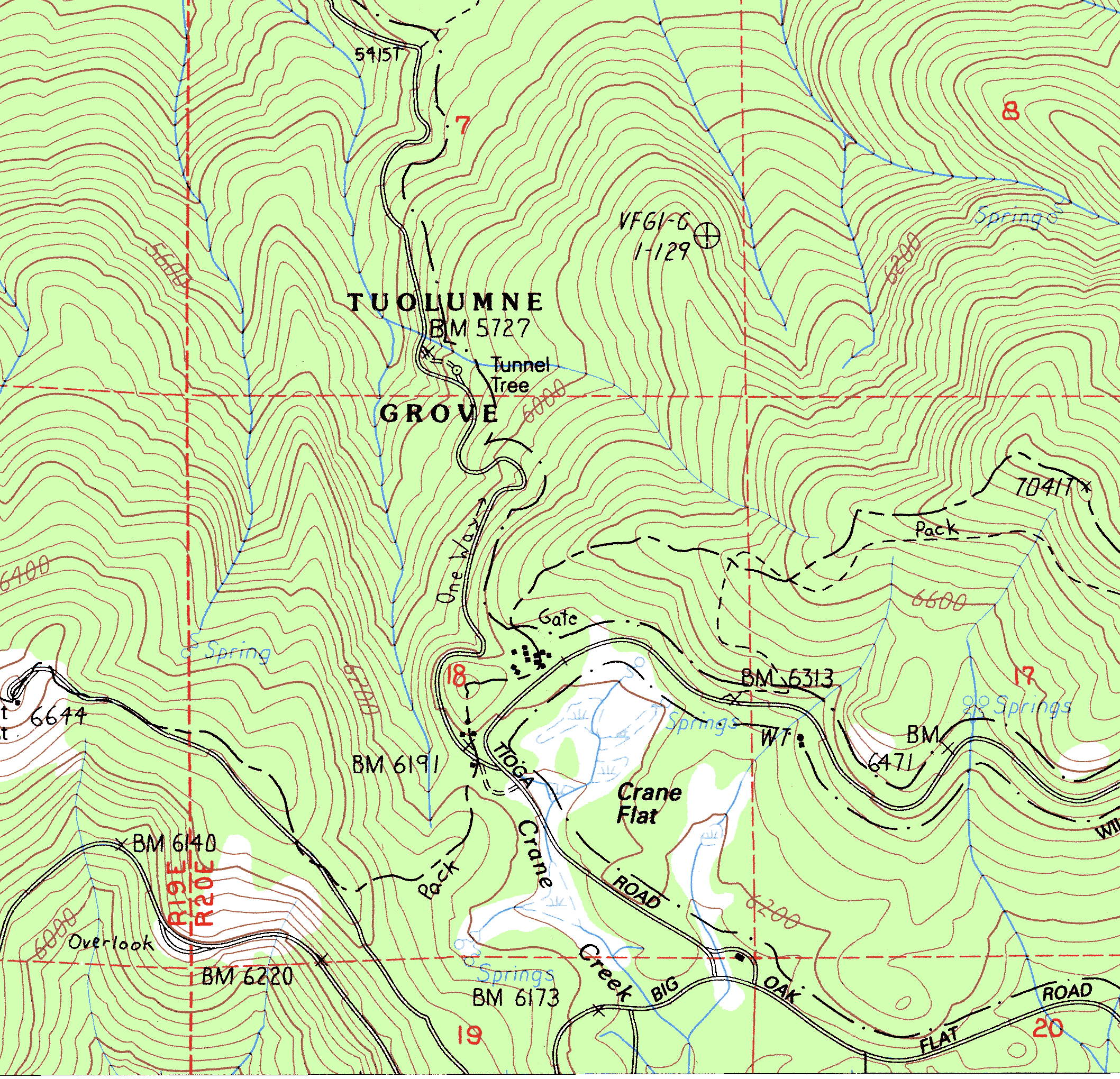
Map of Tuolumne Grove Area

== See also ==
- List of giant sequoia groves
- Mariposa Grove - a nearby giant sequoia grove in Yosemite National Park.
- Merced Grove - a nearby giant sequoia grove in Yosemite National Park.
- Nelder Grove - a nearby giant sequoia grove in the Sierra National Forest.
- History of California
- Tourist attraction
