= Bret Harte Union High School District =

School district in California, United States

Address
- 323 South Main Street Angels Camp, California, 95221; United States

District information
- Type: Public
- Grades: 9–12
- NCES District ID: 0605940

Students and staff
- Students: 624
- Teachers: 35.42 (FTE)
- Staff: 47.75 (FTE)
- Student–teacher ratio: 17.62:1

Other information
- Website: www.brethartebullfrogs.org

Bret Harte Union High School District is a public school district based in Calaveras County, California. The district serves all or part of Angels Camp, Arnold, Avery, Copperopolis, Douglas Flat, Hathaway Pines, Murphys, and Vallecito.

== Schools ==
- Bret Harte Union High School (zoned)
- John Vierra High School (alternative)
- Vallecito High School (continuation)

== Feeder Districts ==
The district is fed by Mark Twain Union Elementary School District, and the Vallecito Union School District, which take care of the elementary and junior high level education.
