= Laura Lyon White =

American activist (1839–1916)

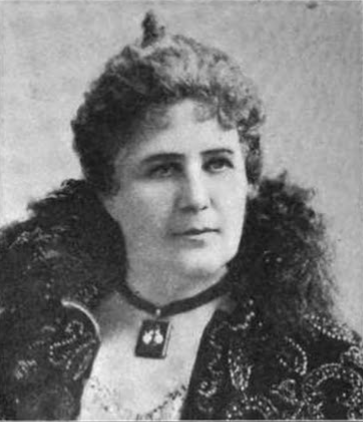
- Born: Laura Lyon; April 12, 1839; French Lick, Indiana, US
- Died: January 18, 1916 (aged 76); San Francisco, California, US
- Education: Oberlin College
- Known for: conservation, civic beauty
- Spouse: Lovell White
- Children: three

Laura Lyon White (April 12, 1839 – January 18, 1916) was an American activist, best known for founding the California Club, working to preserve groves of redwoods in California, and promoting the City Beautiful movement. She wrote several pieces for the Overland Monthly in the later years of the 19th-century and was an ardent suffragist.

White brought pragmatism to the causes that she championed. Working in an era when women had not yet secured the right to vote, she used her affluence and social status to accomplish her goals and to promote the protection of nature and the improvement of life for city dwellers. Unlike John Muir, White did not draw a sharp distinction between natural and urban beauty, and she saw a place for economic development, so long as its excesses were moderated. She "was willing to abide by the social norms of her time while nevertheless using those norms to further her own aims," and hence moved forward the responsibility and influence of women in public life.

== Early life and family ==
Laura Lyon was born on April 12, 1839, near French Lick, Indiana. Her father was Jonathan Lyon, a prosperous flour mill owner. Shortly after her birth, the family moved to Fort Des Moines in Iowa. White was an unruly, adventurous, independent teenager. She persuaded her family to enable her to attend college, and she enrolled in the literature program of Ohio's Oberlin College in 1856. White did not graduate, but rather returned to Des Moines in 1858 and became active in town society. She helped plan celebrations to mark the town's selection as the state capital.

She met Lovell White, a banker, in 1857, and the couple were soon engaged to be married. Shortly after their marriage, the financial panic of 1857 forced Lovell into bankruptcy in March 1858. Seeking better opportunities, the couple moved to California in the fall of 1859.

They began their new life in the rough-and-tumble California Gold Rush mining camp of French Corral, California in the Sierra Nevada foothills. The Whites went on to operate a general store there for five years. The gold deposits in this area were not accessible by conventional techniques. However, the newly developed method of hydraulic mining was successfully used here. This mining practice had severe adverse effects on the surrounding forests and watershed. Her first two children were born in French Corral, but both died early in life of scarlet fever.

In 1864, the Whites moved to San Francisco, California to take a position with the Bank of California, a bank owned by William Chapman Ralston. Lovell White subsequently advanced in position at the bank, and the couple's financial situation was secured. In gratitude for Ralston's assistance, the Whites named their third and last child for him.

== Career ==
By 1870, White was contributing travelogues and morality tales to the Overland Monthly and other journals. Her writing challenged the aggressive exploitation of natural resources by such means as the hydraulic mining that she had witnessed in the Sierra Nevada. She wrote to encourage a public debate that could find a balance between the conservation of nature and its economic uses.

In the 1870s and 1880s, White's political activity centered on her home, with discussions among her invited guests. However, she became frustrated that the male electorate did not take up the causes she considered important, and thus she began to advocate for women's suffrage. Her son Ralston approaching majority, White joined the campaign for women's votes in California in 1896. To that end, she organized the 41st Assembly District Club.

Initially unsuccessful at securing suffrage, White refocused her activity on issues of interest to women generally. In San Francisco, on December 27, 1897, she co-founded, with 26 other women, the California Club of California, a civic association that soon numbered 500 women as charter members. The California Club championed child welfare, the establishment of kindergartens, compulsory schooling, and developing the state's juvenile court system. To protect women, White worked to reform state hospitals for the insane and to pass antivice legislation. The Club sought to regulate smoking, public baths, tenements, and workshops.

The Club expanded its influence by linking up with other clubs in the state. In 1900, White and Clara Burdette founded the California Federation of Women's Clubs (CFWC) of the General Federation of Women's Clubs and Women's club movement in the United States. At the organizing convention, delegates selected Burdette as president and White as first vice-president.

The California Club and the CFWC turned their attention to the conservation of wildlife and natural resources. In 1901, with the support of White and the club, legislation was passed to protect the Western meadowlark from excessive hunting.

Continuing her passion for protecting forests, White joined what became a protracted battle to preserve the Calaveras "Big Trees" tract, a stand of ancient giant sequoia trees and adjacent forest in the Sierra Nevada. An option to buy the property was purchased in January, 1900 by lumberman Robert B. Whiteside. In response, White and the club began a nationwide campaign, asking Congress acquire the land as a public park. Club vice president Mrs. A. D. Sharon met with U.S. President William McKinley. A joint resolution to purchase the property at its market value as timber, sponsored by California Senator George Clement Perkins and Representative Marion De Vries, was signed into law in March, 1900. However, Whiteside refused to sell the land at the offered price, preferring its higher valuation as parkland. A bill to acquire the property by condemnation was promoted by White's California Club, but was blocked by House leaders David B. Henderson and Joseph Gurney Cannon.

White renewed her efforts to protect the "Big Trees" in 1904, presenting a petition with 1,400,000 signatures to President Theodore Roosevelt. After periods of patient lobbying, legislation was passed in February, 1909 authorizing the exchange of existing federal forest land for the Calaveras tract. However, Whiteside still refused to part with the property. It was not until long after White's death that Whiteside began to divest. The North Grove became the first unit of Calaveras Big Trees State Park in 1931. The South Grove gained protection in 1954, after John D. Rockefeller Jr. made a key donation. Also in 1954, a smaller portion of the property became Calaveras Big Tree National Forest under the terms of the 1909 act.

White stepped down from her posts at the California Club and CFWC in 1902, and in 1903 she began a three-year term as president of the Sempervirens Club.

In November, 1904, the California Club launched a campaign to protect a stand of coastal redwoods in Marin County, known as Redwood Canyon. It so happened a foreclosure placed the property under the control of White's husband Lovell and his San Francisco Savings Union bank. When William Kent approached Lovell White about purchasing the lands so that they would be preserved, White lowered his asking price and a deal was struck. In 1907, Kent went on to donate the forest to the federal government; in January, 1908, Theodore Roosevelt proclaimed it Muir Woods National Monument. White hosted a reception honoring Kent for his generosity.

Working at the national level, White chaired the forestry committee of the General Federation of Women's Clubs from 1910 to 1912.

Locally, in San Francisco, White and the California Club continued their efforts to improve living conditions for city dwellers. In 1902, drawing from the same pool of activists in the California Club, White formed the Outdoor Art League and became its first president. The League affiliated with a major promoter of the City Beautiful movement, the American Park and Outdoor Art Association, a forerunner of the American Civic Association. However, the League was soon absorbed into the California Club in 1905.

In 1905, the California Club lobbied for a bond issue for new playgrounds; in 1907, at the club's urging, the city amended its charter to create a municipal playground commission. White was appointed to the commission in 1908, and she was elected its president in 1911. When a rock quarry operated by the Gray Brothers Company at the foot of Telegraph Hill threatened the 2 acres (0.81 ha) Pioneer Park, White successfully sought an injunction to block the blasting. She lobbied the city to acquire additional land, but these efforts did not come to fruition until 1929, when Lillie Hitchcock Coit bequeathed the necessary funds.

White was once again elected president of the California Club in 1910. She (and hence the club) did not take a position on the Hetch Hetchy controversy, which found Kent and John Muir on opposite sides of the question. But the club was a significant supporter of San Francisco's bid to host the 1915 Panama–Pacific International Exposition. White founded the Woman's Board and was instrumental in securing Phoebe Hearst as its honorary president.

Amidst her activism on national and metropolitan stages, White also worked to protect the beauty of Mill Valley, California, where the Whites had a summer residence. In 1902, she convened a group to organize the Outdoor Art Club (not to be confused with San Francisco's Outdoor Art League). White invited Bernard Maybeck to design an Arts and Crafts-style clubhouse for the organization; the project was completed in 1904.

== Recognition ==
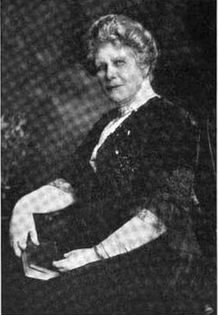
Laura White

In 1910, "for Civic Service and for Helping to Save the Calaveras Big Trees," White was honored by the Native Daughters of the Golden West; her name, with those of Hearst and nine other women, was placed on its Roll of Honor in the award's inaugural year.

== Later life and death ==
During her work at the Exposition, White suffered a cerebral hemorrhage on September 12, 1915. She died in San Francisco on January 18, 1916, attended by a sister, Margaret Whitcomb, and her son, Ralston. Her husband, Lovell, preceded her in death on 31 January 1910.

== Selected works ==
- White, Laura Lyon (April 1873). "Lady Unger". Overland Monthly. 10 (4): 334–341.
- White, Laura Lyon (August 1873). "White As Wool". Overland Monthly. 11 (2): 125–132.
- White, Laura Lyon (December 1888). "A Day's Fishing on the Coos". Overland Monthly. 12 (72): 607–611.
- White, Laura Lyon (September 1889). "The Month of June at Big Meadows". Overland Monthly. 14 (81): 295–301.
- White, Laura Lyon (January 1890). "Miners' Stories II: An Episode of River Mining". Overland Monthly. 15 (85): 26–28.
- White, Laura Lyon (February 1891). "The Colonel, at Home, in Sonoma County". Overland Monthly. 17 (98): 200–208.
- White, Laura Lyon (September 1891). "A Day in the Redwoods of Lagoon Creek". Overland Monthly. 18 (105): 257–260.
