= Mother of the Forest =

Sequoia in California, US

Coordinates: 38.2673°N 120.2849°W

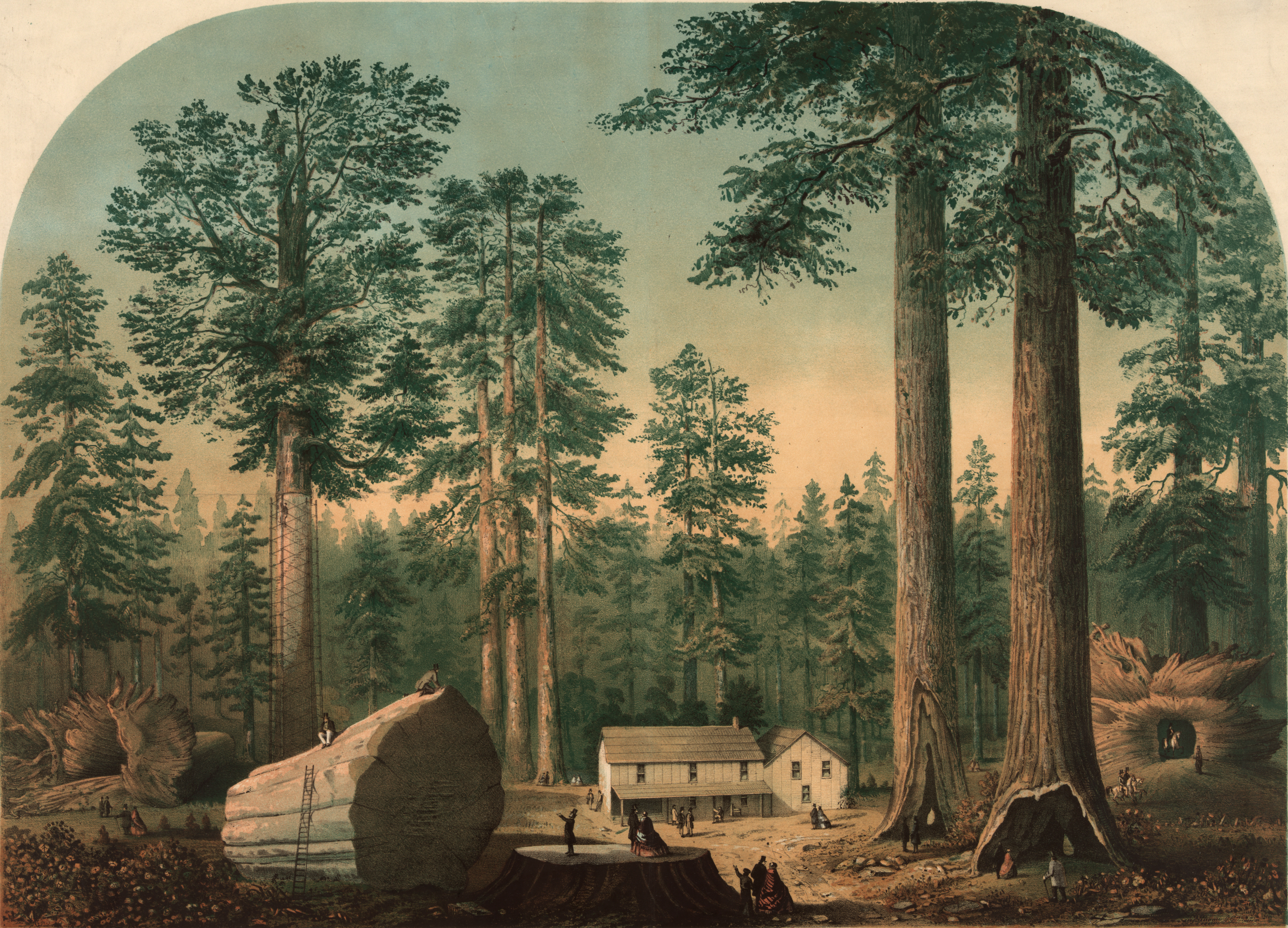
An artist's view of the Calaveras Grove trees before 1860. The Mother of the Forest is the second one from the left.

Mother of the Forest was a giant sequoia in the Sierra Nevada that was stripped of its bark and used as an exhibition tree. It was the second largest tree in Calaveras Grove, standing at 328 feet (100 m) tall with a circumference of 93 feet (28 m), when the grove was discovered by European Americans in 1852. During the California Gold Rush, its bark was harvested and exhibited in New York and London. However, the remaining tree was eventually destroyed by fire in 1908, leaving only a fire-blackened snag.

The damage to Mother of the Forest and felling of other giant sequoias during the mid-1800s sparked public outcry and led to the conservation movement and the legal protection of these trees. In 1931, Calaveras Grove was designated as a part of California State Parks, ensuring the preservation of these remarkable trees for future generations.

== History ==
When the 92 giant sequoias in the valley were discovered and documented in 1852 by Augustus T. Dowd, the Mother of the Forest was the second largest tree after the Discovery Tree, which in 1853 was named The Big Stump. The Mother of the Forest was said to stretch 328 feet (100 m) into the air, with a girth of 93 feet (28 m).

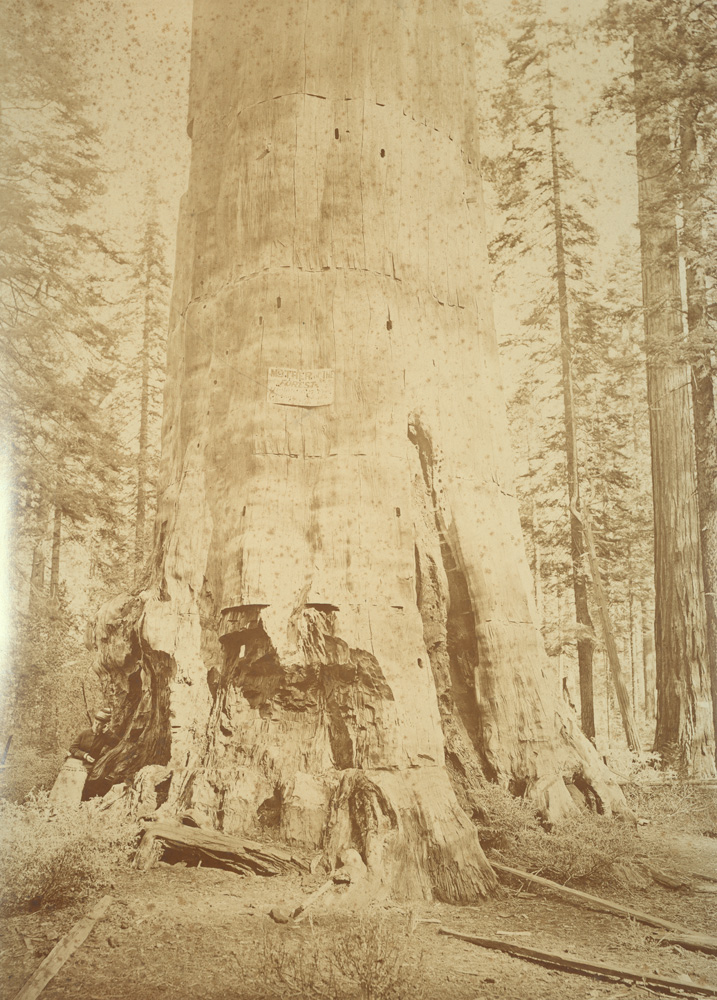
Mother of the Forest c.1873-83

At the time of the California Gold Rush, prospectors were searching the state for undiscovered riches. As photography wasn’t developed enough yet to satisfy people’s curiosity, trees were felled and transported to big cities to prove their existence at great costs. In 1854 after unsuccessful exhibitions of the Discovery Tree, William Lapham, George L. Trask and George Gale set about to have the bark from the trunk of the Mother of the Forest removed, ready to be reassembled at exhibitions. Workers made holes in the tree using pump-augers, and inserted rods into the holes to support the weight of the scaffolding and the workers while the bark was sawed off. Over 90 days, 60 tons of bark were removed in 8 feet (2.4 m) high and 2 to 5 feet (0.61 to 1.52 m) wide sections up to the height of 116 feet (35 m). The bark was 18 inches (46 cm) thick at the base, and on average 11 inches (28 cm) thick. Gale sent samples of the tree to foresters in the east where it was discovered to be 2,520 years old.

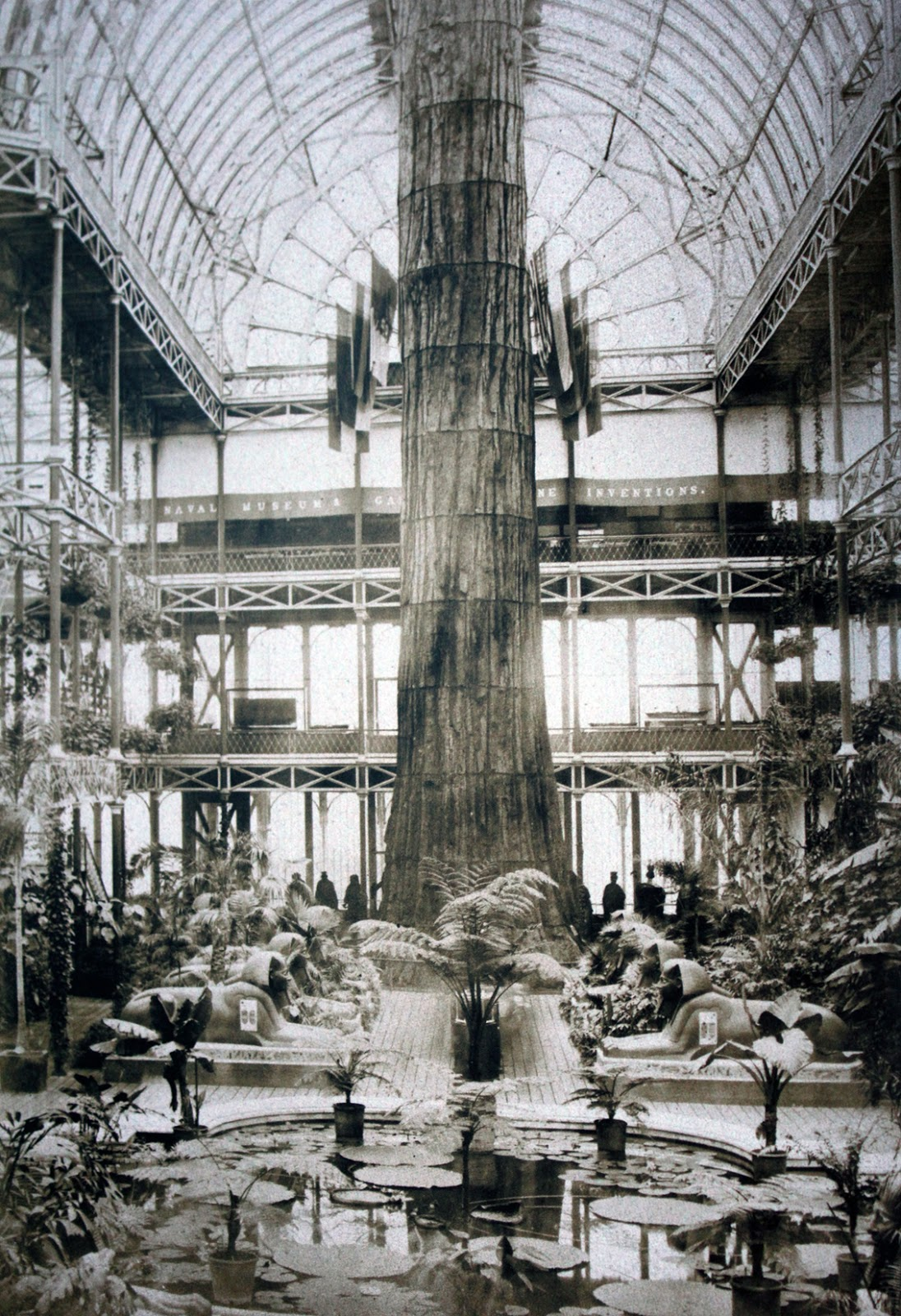
The bark of the Mother of the Forest on exhibit in London as "The Mammoth Tree from California" in 1859

The removed sections of the bark were shipped by sea around Cape Horn to New York, where they were reassembled in 1855 in the shape of the tree for a "vegetable wonders of the gold regions" exhibition in the New York Crystal Palace. After New York, the bark was shipped in 1856 to London, where the sections accommodated by the building in Hyde Park attracted so much attention that all the sections were placed in their full length permanently in The Crystal Palace in London's Sydenham the next year. It was presented to the public as the trunk of a 3,000 year old tree, and was a financial success. It stayed there until the nave of the palace, along with the bark and other exhibits, were destroyed in a fire in 1866.

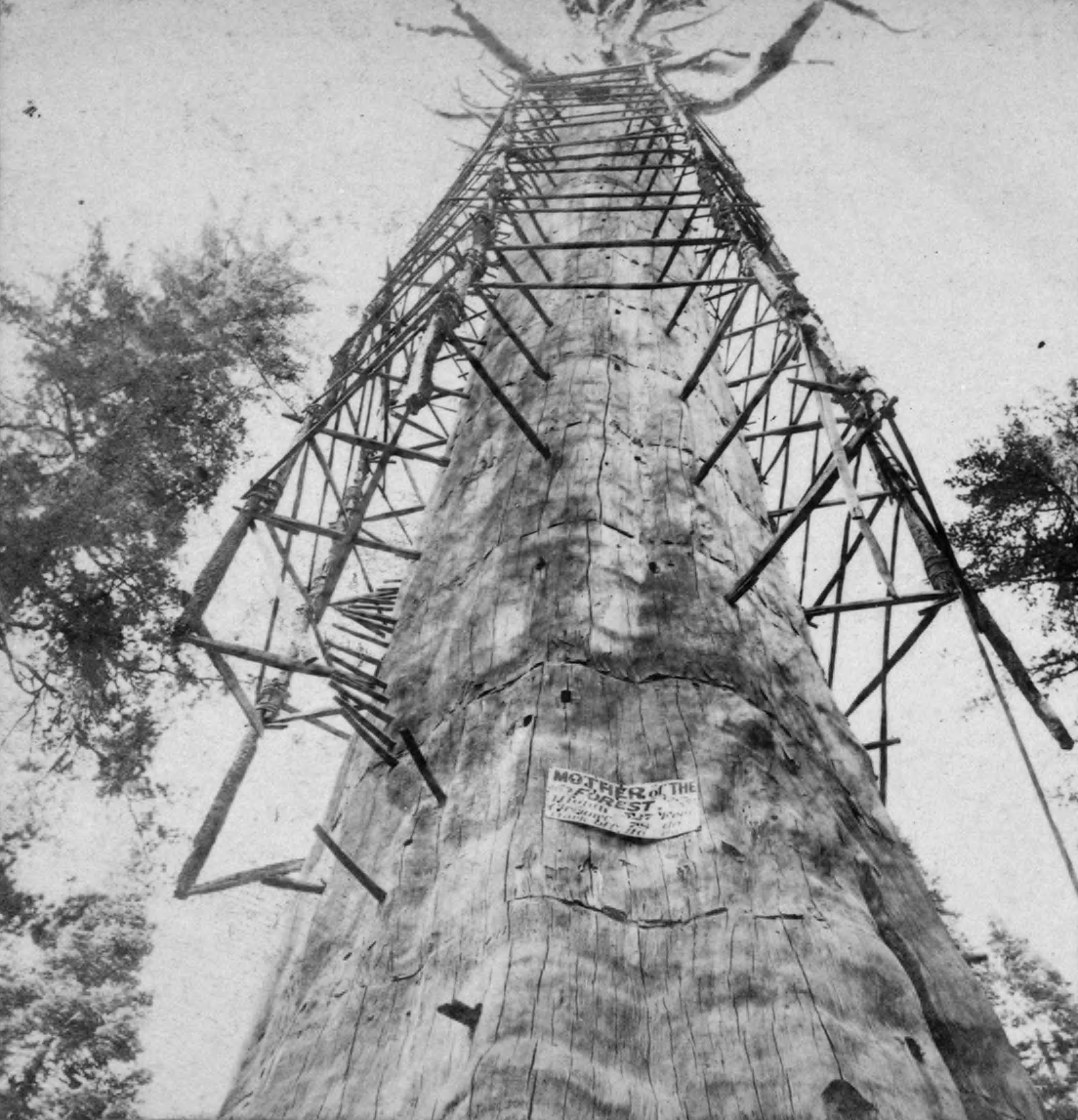
1866 with empty branches and scaffolding still in place

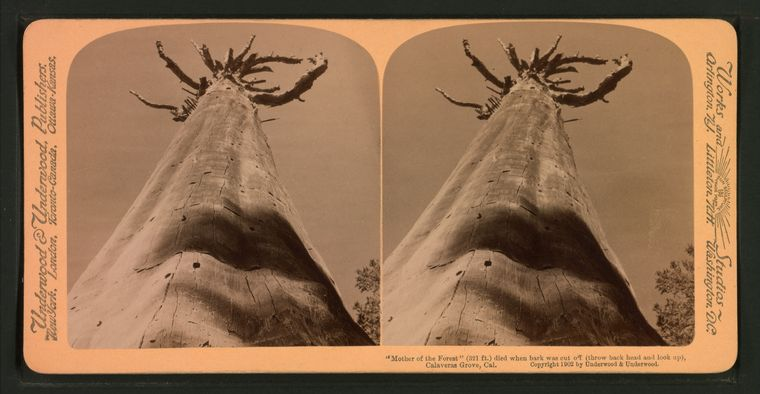
Stereoscopic photograph of the Mother of the Forest from the top of the scaffolding

The Mother of the Forest in Calaveras Grove did not survive for long once the bark had been removed. In 1856 the tree still had full foliage, but within five years no leaves remained. The plan for the remaining tree was to build a spiral staircase around the bare section and create a vista for visitors high up in the tree. Hutchings’ 1886 book makes a mention of names and dates of visitors having been carved into the tree at different heights, especially at the top.

Famed naturalist John Muir visited the Calaveras Grove with C. Hart Merriam and Florence Merriam Bailey in 1901 and posed for a photograph with the Mother of the Forest in the background.

In 1908, with the tree unprotected by its fire resistant bark, a fire swept through the area and burned away much of what was left of the tree.

== Legacy ==
Despite or due to the 1850s exhibitions, the destruction of the big trees was met with public outcry. In 1864, on introducing the bill that would become the Yosemite Grant, senator John Conness opined that even after people had seen the physical evidence of the Discovery Tree and the Mother of the Forest, they still didn’t believe the trees were genuine, and that the areas they were from should be protected instead. In 1903, after having spent several days under the Yosemite sequoias with John Muir, president Theodore Roosevelt gave a speech saying that "As regards some of the trees, I want them preserved because they are the only things of their kind in the world."

The tree and its environments were owned by several lumber companies around the turn of the century, with plans to cut the remaining trees down, as sequoia and giant sequoia with their thick trunks were seen as great sources of lumber at the time. This again caused a chorus of public outcry by locals and conservationists, and the area continued to be treated as a tourist attraction. The Yosemite protection was gradually extended to most sequoias, and Calaveras Grove was joined to California State Parks in 1931.

== Present day ==
According to a 2006 trail guide, what is left of Mother of the Forest stands as a large fire-blackened snag along the loop trail through the North Grove, at the far end of the loop. Saw marks made when the bark was cut away are still visible on the trunk, which stands over 100 feet (30 m) tall.

== See also ==
- List of sequoia groves
- List of California state parks
- List of individual trees
- List of largest giant sequoias
- List of oldest trees
- List of superlative trees
- Farquhar, Francis Peloubet (1965). History of the Sierra Nevada. Berkeley, California, London: University of California Press. pp. 25 84. ISBN 9780520253957.
- Farmer, Jared (2013). Trees in Paradise: A California History. W. W. Norton & Company. p. 25. ISBN 9780393241273.
- Hawken, Paul (2008) [2007]. Blessed unrest: how the largest social movement in history is restoring grace, justice, and beauty to the world. New York: Viking, Penguin Books. ISBN 978-0143113652.
- Hutchings, J.M. (1886). In the Heart of the Sierras. Oakland California: Pacific Press Publishing. p. 223.
