= Vallecito Union School District =

School district in Calaveras County, California, United States

Vallecito Union School District (VUSD)

Address
- 4545 Moran Road Calaveras County Avery, California, 95224; United States
- Coordinates: 38.2019°N 120.3654°W

District information
- Grades: K–8
- Established: 1860
- Superintendent: Tom Hoskins
- Schools: Avery Middle School (Avery, CA), Albert A. Michelson (Murphys, CA), Hazel Fischer (Arnold, CA)
- NCES District ID: 0640680

Students and staff
- Students: Around 580
- Teachers: 37.76 (FTE)
- Staff: 43.12 (FTE)
- Student–teacher ratio: 18.1

Other information
- Website: www.vallecitok12.com

Vallecito Union School District is a unified school district located in Avery, California, a town located in Calaveras County. It operates three schools: Avery Middle School, Albert Michelson Elementary, and Hazel Fischer Elementary. The current superintendent is Tom Hoskins.

Albert Michelson Elementary School, Hazel Fischer Elementary School, and Avery Middle School are all part of the Vallecito Union School District in Calaveras County, California, serving students in the Sierra Nevada foothills near areas like Murphys, Arnold, and Avery.

Albert Michelson Elementary, a TK-5 campus located in the historic Gold Rush town of Murphys, offers robust academics in subjects like language arts, math, science, and social-emotional learning, while fostering a tight-knit community with active parent involvement, named after the Nobel Prize-winning physicist Albert Michelson who spent part of his childhood there.

Hazel Fischer Elementary, a TK-5 school nestled amid the Stanislaus National Forest in Arnold and adjacent to White Pines Lake, emphasizes strong family partnerships and provides a natural backdrop for student learning in a supportive setting.

Avery Middle School, serving grades 6-8 in the district's heart at Avery, with notable recognitions including California Distinguished School status, Gold Ribbon School honors, and multiple Apple Distinguished School awards, highlighting its innovative approach and commitment to student success.

Together, these schools form a cohesive educational pathway in a rural, community-focused district that values both academic excellence and local ties.

Albert A. Michelson Elementary School- Murphys, CA

Albert Michelson Elementary School is an elementary school dedicated to helping students learn, grow, and succeed in a positive environment. The school provides instruction in core subjects such as reading, writing, mathematics, science, and social studies while encouraging creativity, critical thinking, and collaboration. Teachers and staff work closely with students to create a welcoming atmosphere where every child feels valued and supported.

In addition to academics, Albert Michelson Elementary School offers activities and programs that help students develop important life skills. Through teamwork, leadership opportunities, and community involvement, students learn responsibility and respect for others. The school strives to prepare children for future educational success by promoting curiosity, perseverance, and a lifelong love of learning.

Hazel Fischer Elementary School - Arnold, CA

Hazel Fischer Elementary School is a school committed to providing students with a safe, supportive, and engaging learning environment. The school focuses on helping children build strong academic foundations in subjects such as reading, writing, mathematics, science, and social studies. Teachers and staff encourage students to work hard, think creatively, and develop confidence in their abilities.

Beyond academics, Hazel Fischer Elementary School promotes character development, teamwork, and community involvement. Students have opportunities to participate in activities that strengthen leadership skills, responsibility, and respect for others. By fostering a positive school culture and a love of learning, Hazel Fischer Elementary School helps prepare students for success in their future education and everyday lives.

Avery Middle School - Avery, CA

Avery Middle School, located in Avery, California, serves students in a supportive and community-focused learning environment. The school is dedicated to helping students achieve academic success while developing important life skills such as responsibility, critical thinking, and collaboration. Through a variety of subjects and educational opportunities, students are encouraged to challenge themselves, explore their interests, and become active participants in their learning.

In addition to academics, Avery Middle School offers extracurricular activities and programs that help students build leadership, teamwork, and communication skills. The school values respect, perseverance, and community involvement, creating a positive atmosphere where students can grow both inside and outside the classroom. By preparing students for the challenges of high school and beyond, Avery Middle School plays an important role in the education and development of young people in the Avery community.
