= Avery, California =

Avery
- census-designated place
- Location in Calaveras County and the state of California

- Location in the United States
- Coordinates: 38°12′16″N 120°22′12″W
- Country: United States
- State: California
- County: Calaveras

Area
  - Total: 2.12 sq mi (5.50 km^{2})
  - Land: 2.10 sq mi (5.45 km^{2})
  - Water: 0.019 sq mi (0.05 km^{2}) 0.87%
- Elevation: 3,389 ft (1,033 m)

Population (2020)
  - Total: 636
  - Density: 302.3/sq mi (116.72/km^{2})
- Time zone: UTC-8 (Pacific (PST))
  - Summer (DST): UTC-7 (PDT)
- ZIP code: 95224
- Area code: 209
- FIPS code: 06-03316
- GNIS feature IDs: 218477, 2407784

Avery is a census-designated place (CDP) in Calaveras County, California, United States. The population was 636 at the 2020 census. Avery is located on State Route 4 and is home to the oldest continually operating hotel in the county, the Avery Hotel Restaurant & Saloon. Built in 1853, it was known as the "Half Way House," being located between Murphys, Arnold, and Calaveras Big Trees State Park.

== Geography ==
According to the United States Census Bureau, the CDP has a total area of 2.1 square miles (5.4 km^{2}), of which over 99% is land.

=== Climate ===
Climate data for Avery, CA
Month	Jan	Feb	Mar	Apr	May	Jun	Jul	Aug	Sep	Oct	Nov	Dec	Year
Mean daily maximum °F (°C)	51 (11)	52 (11)	56 (13)	61 (16)	70 (21)	80 (27)	88 (31)	88 (31)	83 (28)	71 (22)	58 (14)	50 (10)	67 (20)
Mean daily minimum °F (°C)	33 (1)	34 (1)	36 (2)	39 (4)	45 (7)	53 (12)	58 (14)	57 (14)	54 (12)	46 (8)	38 (3)	33 (1)	44 (7)
Average precipitation inches (mm)	8.9 (230)	7.8 (200)	7.2 (180)	4.0 (100)	2.1 (53)	0.5 (13)	0.1 (2.5)	0.1 (2.5)	0.4 (10)	2.3 (58)	4.6 (120)	7.8 (200)	45.8 (1,169)
Average snowfall inches (cm)	10 (25)	8 (20)	9 (23)	6 (15)	0.1 (0.25)	0.0 (0.0)	0.0 (0.0)	0.0 (0.0)	0.0 (0.0)	0.0 (0.0)	2.0 (5.1)	8.5 (22)	43.6 (110.35)
Source: noaa

== History ==
The place is named after George J. Avery, its first postmaster. The first post office was established in 1885, closed in 1943, and re-established in 1949.

== Demographics ==
Historical population
Census	Pop.	Note	%±
2000	672		—
2010	646		−3.9%
2020	636		−1.5%
U.S. Decennial Census; 1860–1870 1880-1890; 1900 1910 1920; 1930 1940 1950; 1960 1970 1980; 1990 2000 2010

Avery first appeared as a census designated place in the 2000 U.S. census.

=== Racial and ethnic composition ===
Avery CDP, California – Racial and ethnic composition Note: the US Census treats Hispanic/Latino as an ethnic category. This table excludes Latinos from the racial categories and assigns them to a separate category. Hispanics/Latinos may be of any race.
Race / Ethnicity (NH = Non-Hispanic)	Pop 2000	Pop 2010	Pop 2020	% 2000	% 2010	% 2020
White alone (NH)	613	575	524	91.22%	89.01%	82.39%
Black or African American alone (NH)	0	5	2	0.00%	0.77%	0.31%
Native American or Alaska Native alone (NH)	7	1	7	1.04%	0.15%	1.10%
Asian alone (NH)	4	3	0	0.60%	0.46%	0.00%
Native Hawaiian or Pacific Islander alone (NH)	2	1	0	0.30%	0.15%	0.00%
Other race alone (NH)	0	0	0	0.00%	0.00%	0.00%
Mixed race or Multiracial (NH)	17	23	48	2.53%	3.56%	7.55%
Hispanic or Latino (any race)	29	38	55	4.32%	5.88%	8.65%
Total	672	646	636	100.00%	100.00%	100.00%

=== 2020 census ===
As of the 2020 census, Avery had a population of 636. The population density was 302.3 inhabitants per square mile (116.7/km^{2}). The age distribution was 15.6% under the age of 18, 3.8% aged 18 to 24, 21.1% aged 25 to 44, 32.9% aged 45 to 64, and 26.7% who were 65 years of age or older. The median age was 56.0 years. For every 100 females there were 87.6 males, and for every 100 females age 18 and over there were 91.1 males age 18 and over.

0.0% of residents lived in urban areas, while 100.0% lived in rural areas.

The racial makeup of Avery was 84.9% White, 0.3% African American, 1.9% Native American, 0.0% Asian, 0.0% Pacific Islander, 1.6% from other races, and 11.3% from two or more races. Hispanic or Latino of any race were 8.6% of the population.

The whole population lived in households. There were 289 households in Avery, of which 17.3% had children under the age of 18 living in them. Of all households, 54.7% were married-couple households, 2.8% were cohabiting couple households, 25.3% were households with a male householder and no spouse or partner present, and 17.3% were households with a female householder and no spouse or partner present. About 30.4% of all households were made up of individuals and 15.9% had someone living alone who was 65 years of age or older. The average household size was 2.2. There were 188 families (65.1% of all households).

There were 387 housing units at an average density of 183.9 units per square mile (71.0 units/km^{2}), of which 289 (74.7%) were occupied and 25.3% were vacant. The homeowner vacancy rate was 3.8% and the rental vacancy rate was 0.0%. Of occupied units, 86.5% were owner-occupied and 13.5% were renter-occupied.

== Politics ==
In the state legislature, Avery is in the 8th senatorial district, represented by Democrat Angelique Ashby, and the 5th Assembly district, represented by Republican Joe Patterson. Federally, Avery is in California's 4th congressional district, represented by Democrat Mike Thompson.
