= Calaveras Big Tree National Forest =

National forest in California, US

Coordinates: 38.2523°N 120.2481°W

Calaveras Big Tree National Forest, in the Sierra Nevada, was established in California on May 11, 1954, with 390 acres (1.6 km^{2}) to protect a grove of Giant Sequoias, although it had been authorized since February 18, 1909.

== Combined ==
Calaveras Big Tree National Forest was the smallest unit in the United States National Forest system, and was administratively combined with the Stanislaus National Forest.

=== Transfer ===
In 1990 it was proposed that the federal lands be transferred to the State of California to be included in the adjoining Calaveras Big Trees State Park.
