= Calaveras Big Trees State Park =

State park in California, US

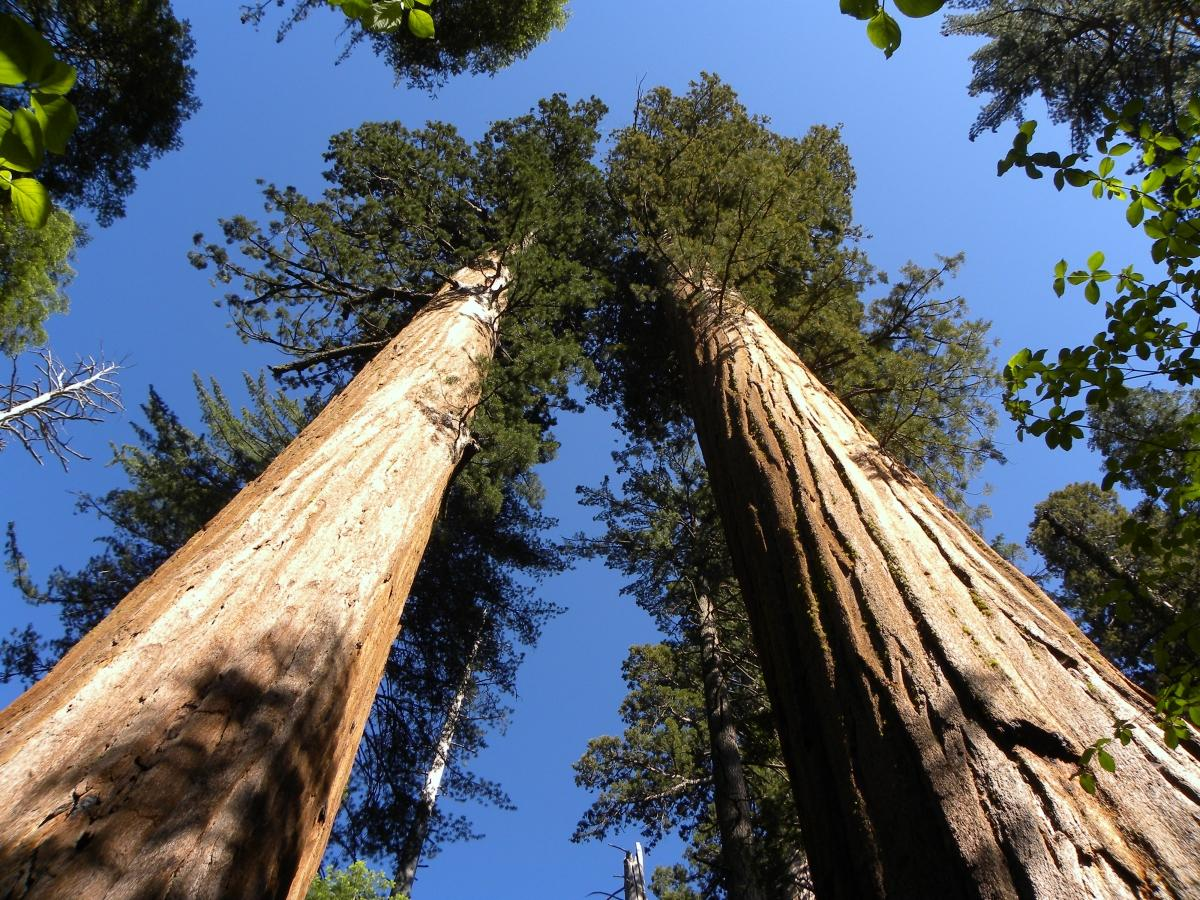
- Giant sequoias in Calaveras South Grove

- Location within California Location within the United States
- Location: Calaveras and Tuolumne counties, California, United States
- Nearest city: Arnold, California
- Coordinates: 38°16′22″N 120°17′26″W
- Area: 6,498 acres (26.30 km^{2})
- Elevation: 4,560–4,920 ft (1,390–1,500 m)
- Established: 1931
- Visitors: more than 250,000 (in 2022)
- Governing body: California Department of Parks and Recreation

Calaveras Big Trees State Park is a state park of California, United States, preserving two groves of giant sequoia trees. Located four miles (6.4 km) northeast of Arnold in the middle elevations of the Sierra Nevada, it has been a major tourist attraction since 1852, when the existence of the trees was first widely reported. A famous exhibition tree, the Discovery Tree, was felled for display in 1853, while another famous tree, the Mother of the Forest, was stripped of its bark for display the next year. The park is also considered the longest continuously operated tourist attraction in California. Part of the natural area is old-growth forest and recognized by the Old-Growth Forest Network. The park is home to the most northern grove of Giant Sequoia in the state.

== History ==
=== Early history ===
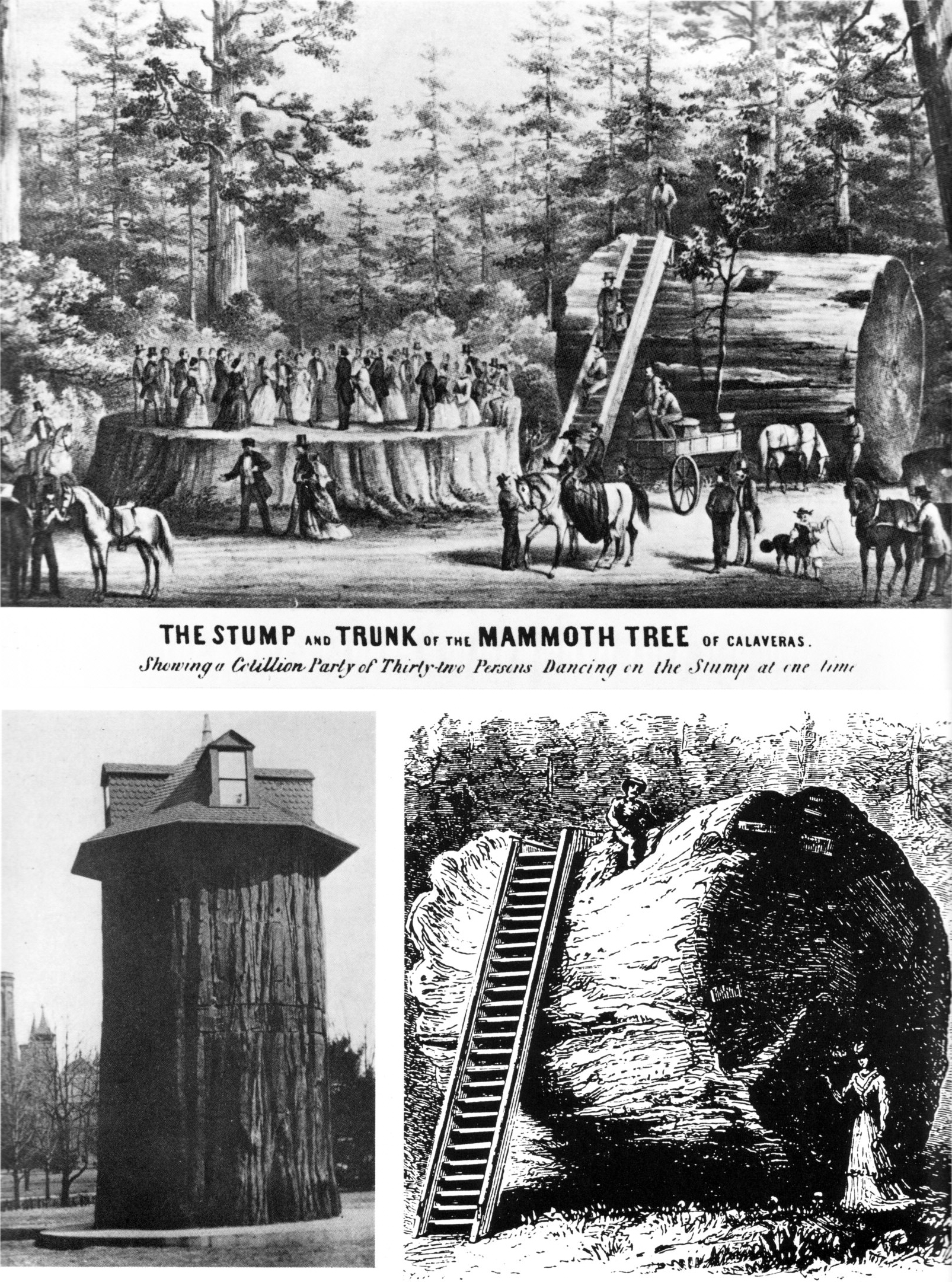
Shortly after their discovery by Europeans, giant sequoias were subject to many exhibitions

The giant sequoia was well known to Native American tribes living in its area. Native American names for the species include Wawona, toos-pung-ish and hea-mi-within, the latter two in the language of the Tule River Tribe.

The first reference to the giant sequoias of Calaveras Big Trees by Europeans was in 1833, in the diary of the explorer J. K. Leonard; the reference does not mention any specific locality, but his route would have taken him through the Calaveras Grove. This discovery was not publicized. The next European to see the trees was John M. Wooster, who carved his initials in the bark of the 'Hercules' tree in the Calaveras Grove in 1850; again, this received no publicity. Much more publicity was given to Augustus T. Dowd at the North Grove in 1852, commonly cited as the discoverer of both the grove and the species as a whole.

The "Discovery Tree" was recorded by Dowd in 1852 and felled in 1853, leaving a giant stump and a section of trunk showing the holes made by the augers used to fell it. It measured 25 ft (7.6 m) in diameter at its base and was determined by ring count to be 1,244 years old when felled. A section of the trunk was toured with little fanfare while the stump was later turned into a dance floor. John Muir wrote an essay titled "The Vandals Then Danced Upon the Stump!" to criticize the felling of the tree.

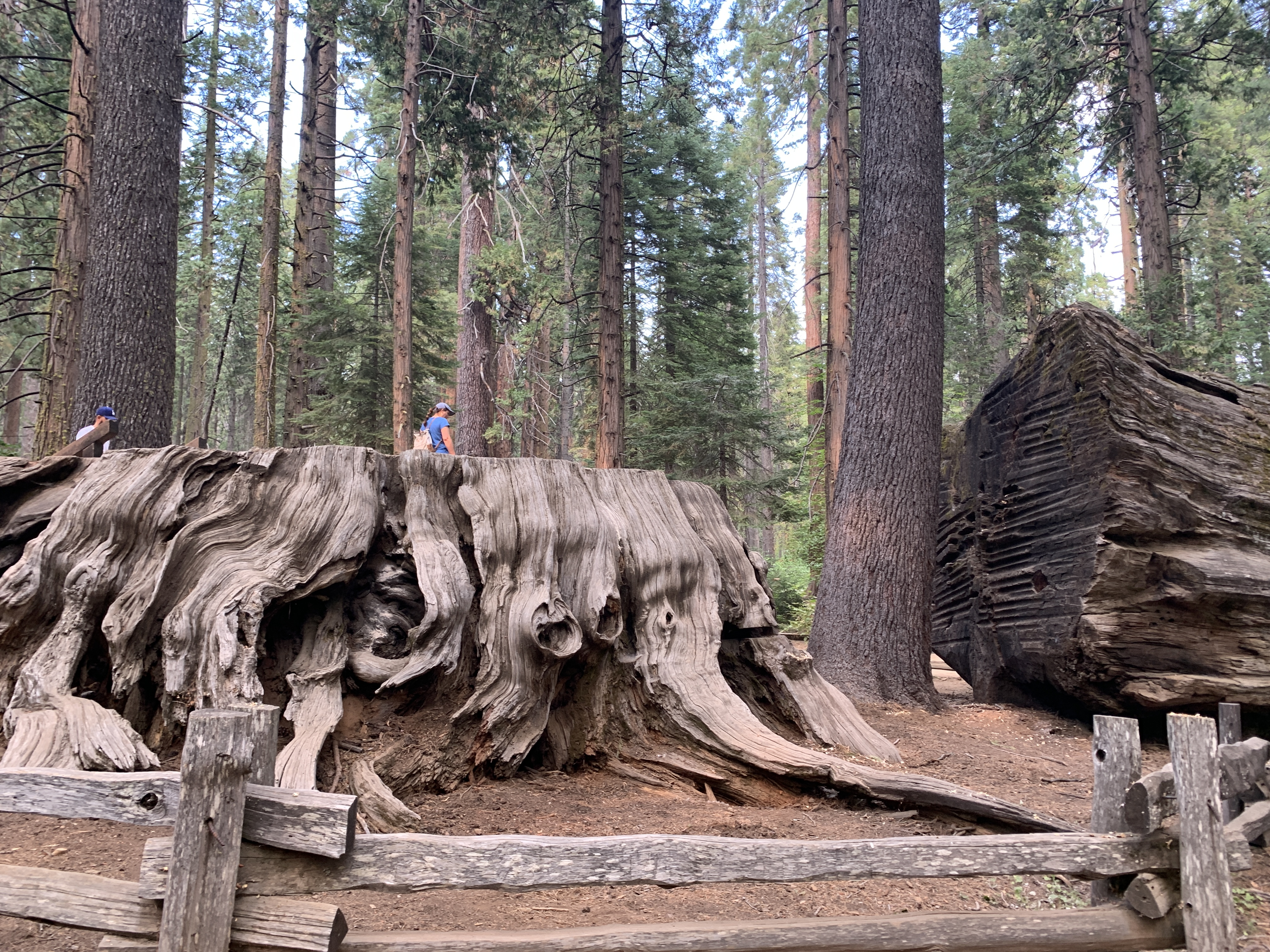
Discovery Tree, the largest known Giant Sequoia to be damaged by man, was cut down. An adult person is standing on the platform trunk

In 1854, a second tree named the "Mother of the Forest" was stripped of its bark, to be reassembled at exhibitions. This mortally wounded the tree, since the outer layer of protective bark was removed. The tree didn't survive long after, having shed its entire canopy by 1861. In 1908, with the tree unprotected by its fire resistant bark, a fire swept through the area and burned away much of what was left of the tree, leaving a fire-blackened snag.

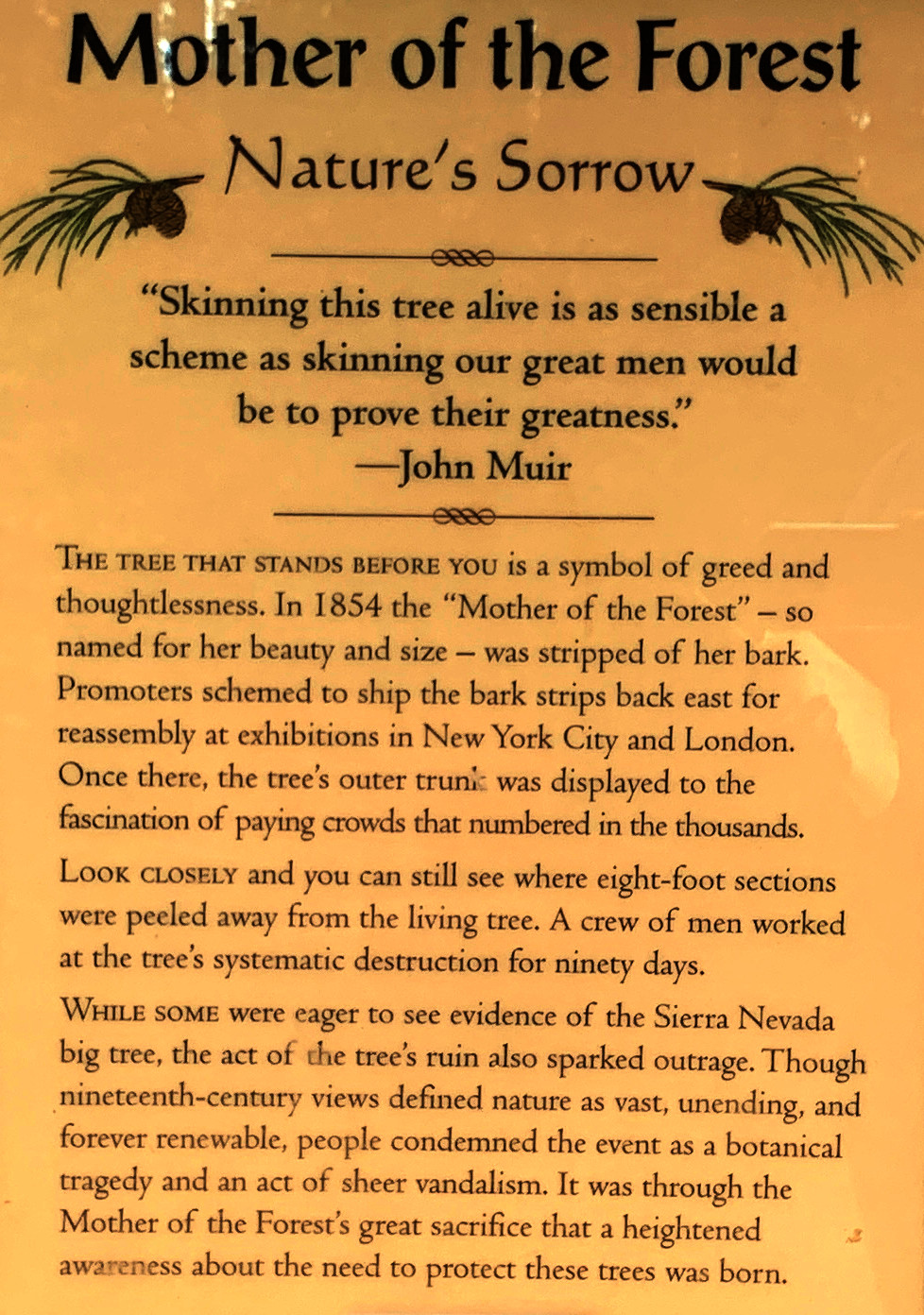
John Muir for Mother of the Forest

The forest is also home to what remains of the "Father of the Forest", an ancient and exceedingly enormous giant sequoia which fell centuries ago. Reportedly, the tree was 435 ft high with a 110 ft circumference- a "giant of giants", which would have made it the largest giant sequoia ever reported. Currently the remains of the tree exist as a popular tourist attraction in the state park.

In early 1880s, a tunnel was cut through the compartments by a private land owner at the request of James Sperry, founder of the Murphys Hotel, so that tourists could pass through it. The tree was chosen in part because of the large forest fire scar. The Pioneer Cabin Tree, as it was soon called, emulated the tunnel carved into Yosemite's Wawona Tree, and was intended to compete with it for tourists.

=== Preservation ===
Along with the 1850s exhibitions, the destruction of the big trees was met with public outcry. In 1864, on introducing the bill that would become the Yosemite Grant, senator John Conness opined that even after people had seen the physical evidence of the Discovery Tree and the Mother of the Forest, they still did not believe the trees were genuine, and that the areas they were from should be protected. This did not guarantee any legal protection for the trees of Calaveras Grove.

By the turn of the century the land was owned by several lumber companies, with plans to cut the remaining trees down, as sequoia and giant sequoia with their thick trunks were seen as great sources of lumber at the time. This again caused a chorus of public outcry by locals and conservationists, and the area continued to be treated as a tourist attraction. Parcels of land that would later become the state park and nearby national park were optioned by lumberman Robert P. Whiteside in January 1900, with the intention of logging. A protracted battle to preserve the trees was launched by Laura Lyon White and the California Club. Legislation in 1900 and 1909 authorized the federal government to purchase the property, but Whiteside refused to sell the land at the offered price, preferring its higher valuation as parkland. It was not until 1931 that Whiteside's family began to divest the property, beginning with the North Grove.

The Yosemite protection was gradually extended to most sequoias, and Calaveras Grove was joined to California State Parks in 1931. According to John Muir the forest protected by the park is: "A flowering glade in the very heart of the woods, forming a fine center for the student, and a delicious resting place for the weary."

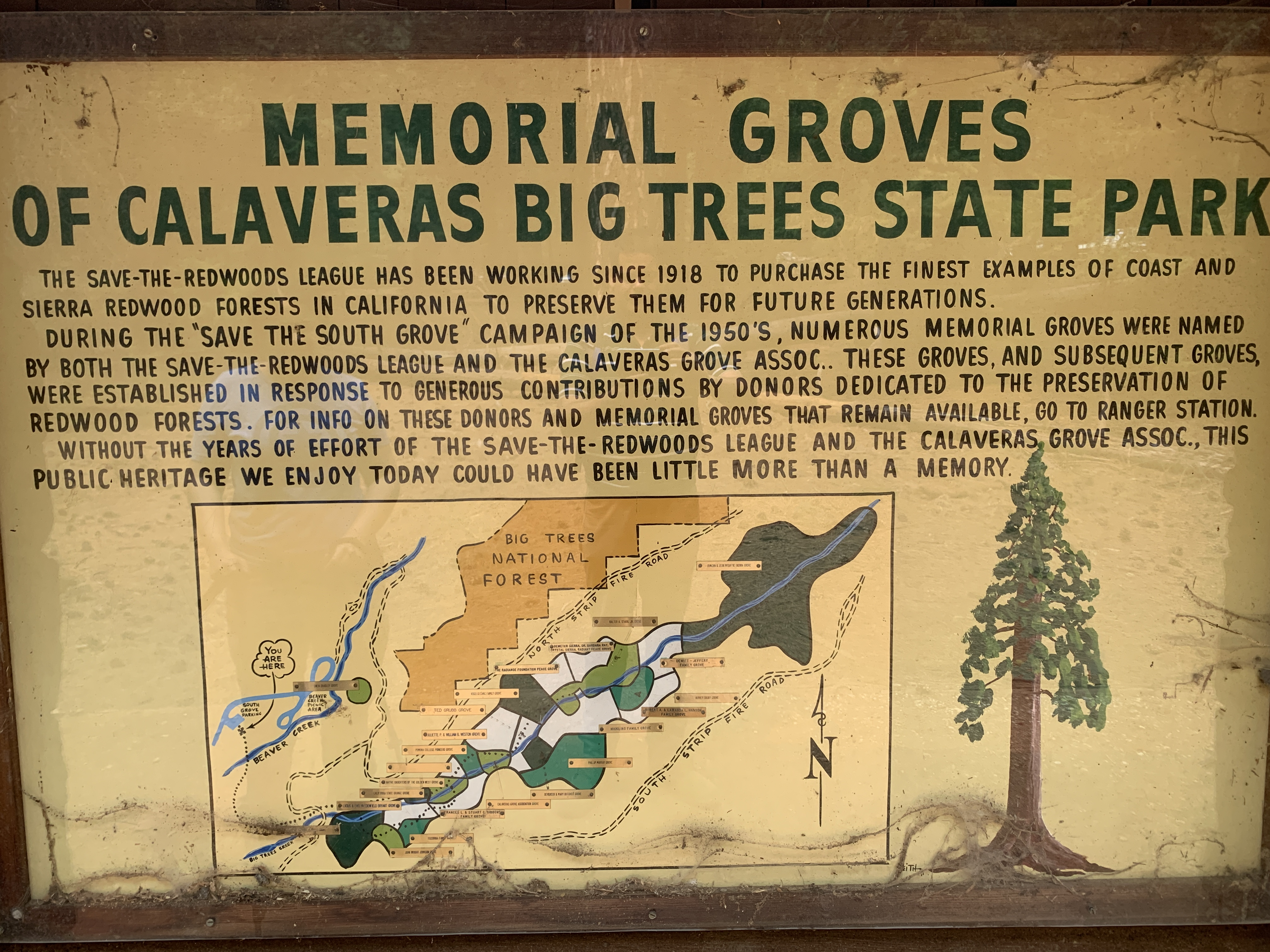
Save-the-Redwood and Calaveras-Grove-Association bought the parcels of land to make Calaveras Big Tree State Park

Over the years other parcels of mixed conifer forests, including the much larger South Calaveras Grove of Giant Sequoias (purchased in 1954 for US$2.8 million, equivalent to US $33.6 million in 2025 dollars), have been added to the park to bring the total area to over 6,400 acres (2,600 ha). The North Grove contains about 100 mature giant sequoias; the South Grove, about 1,000. The state park now encompasses 6,498 acres (2,630 ha) in Calaveras and Tuolumne counties.

=== Fire management ===
The importance of fire to giant sequoias cannot be overstated. Other than the change of seasons, fire is the most recurrent and critical process in determining the life history of this species. Tree ring records from giant sequoias show that frequent surface fires were the typical pattern of fire occurrence over the past 2,000 years. But this pattern changed after about 1860, when fire frequency declined sharply. This decline in regional fire was probably a result of decrease in fires set by Native Americans, followed by fire suppression by government agencies.

The state provided $7 million in 2022 from the Wildfire and Forest Resiliency Program to spend over five years, "to make our forest resilient when a big fire comes through". A prescribed burn was conducted by park crews on about 180 acres (73 ha) of the North Grove in late October through early November.

Calaveras has a long history of prescribed burns, mainly to enhance vegetation management, increase the resilience of the forest, remove bug-killed trees, and even promote giant sequoia regeneration. Recently there have been multiple prescribed burns in the Calaveras area. In October 2024, there was a large prescribed burn (over 1,000 acres) which was managed by CAL FIRE and local county officials. Before this burn occurred, these entities removed heavy fuel and organic debris away from Sequoia bases to mitigate fire damage risk. This prescribed burn was mainly successful; however, it is currently being followed up by a new prescribed burn that began September 30, 2026. This burn was planned to re-burn some of the areas that did not burn adequately in 2024. These areas include the South Grove, North Grove Meadow, and West Moran. This prescribed burn is currently ongoing and could depend on weather conditions; the effects of the prescribed burn can be noticed as far out as Arnold.

== Forest health ==
Recently (in 2023), researchers who climbed the giant sequoias found there were many signs pointing towards beetle entries in the trees. These marks were found both in the north and south groves. According to a recent study by Foote, it's believed the insect responsible is Phloeosinus punctatus, a bark beetle common in the Western United States. This bark beetle is well-known for laying eggs in sequoia limbs and is a common issue in many sequoia groves. Fallen giant sequoia branches especially provide a breeding habitat for these beetles, which allows their populations to thrive on the forest floor. Phloesinus punctatus is most active between May and August, which is when adults colonize branches and new generations emerge. While there are no recorded tree deaths because of these bark beetles, a 2024 study showed that the bark beetles have a particularly negative effect on trees in dry conditions. Overall, the exact effects of bark beetles are unknown, but they are potentially detrimental to tree health. Methods to control their population by removing fallen branches on the forest floor have been considered, but the effectiveness of this as well as potential negative effects on other insect populations remain untested.

== Attractions ==
The North Grove includes several noteworthy giant sequoias:

- Discovery Tree: the stump of what was once the largest tree of the park.
- Mother of the Forest: a fire-blackened snag is all that remains of the second largest tree of the park.
- Pioneer Cabin Tree: a giant sequoia tree that collapsed during a storm on January 8, 2017; it was one of only two living giant sequoia tunnel trees still standing (the other being the California Tunnel Tree of Mariposa Grove).
- Empire State: the largest tree of the North Grove, which measures 30 ft (9.1 m) at ground level and 23 ft (7.0 m) at 6 ft (1.8 m) above ground.

The South Grove also included several noteworthy giant sequoias:

- Louis Agassiz: the largest living tree of the Calaveras groves measuring 250 feet (76 m) tall and more than 25 feet (7.6 m) in diameter 6 feet (1.8 m) above ground. It is the 37th largest giant sequoia in the world, and could be considered either the 36th or 35th largest depending on how badly Ishi Giant and Black Mountain Beauty have atrophied following devastating wildfires in 2015 and 2017, respectively.
- Palace Hotel Tree: the second largest living tree of the Calaveras groves; features a large deep burn scar at its base that one can walk into. This tree has nails burned into its inner trunk by past travelers.

Other attractions of Calaveras Big Trees include the Stanislaus River, Beaver Creek, the Lava Bluff Trail, and Bradley Trail.

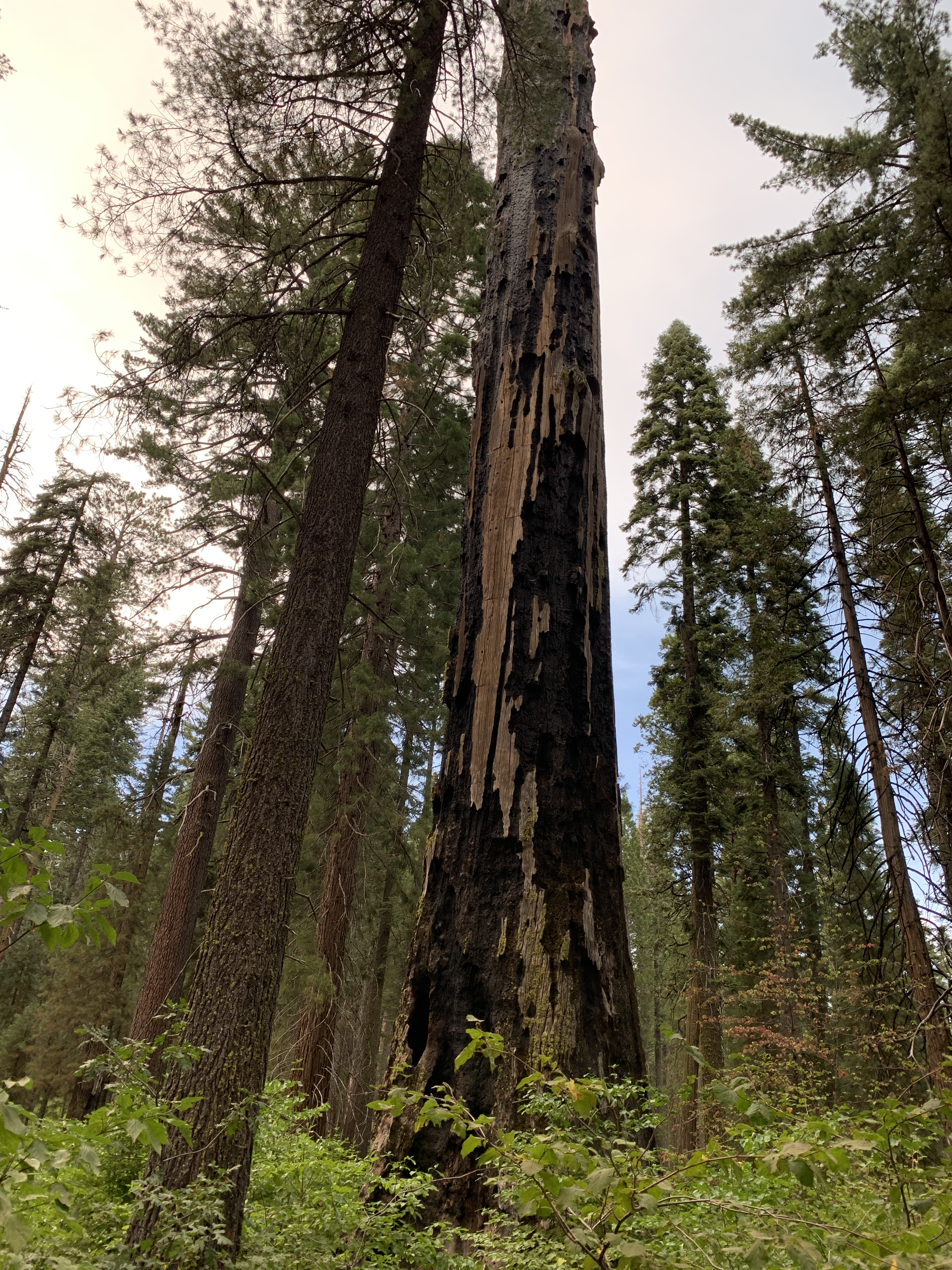
Mother of the Forest

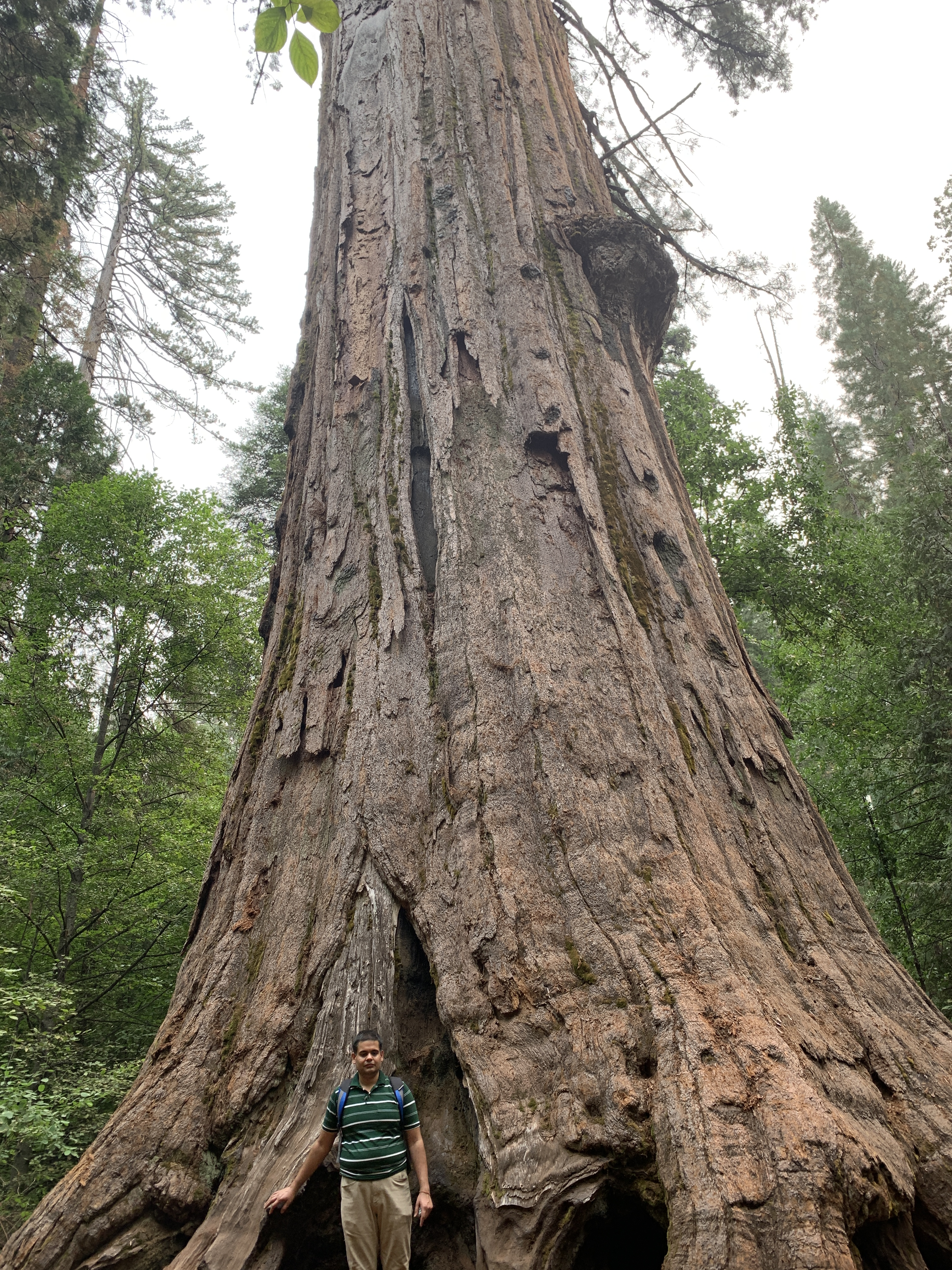
Louis Agassiz Tree - One of the last few Giant Sequoia

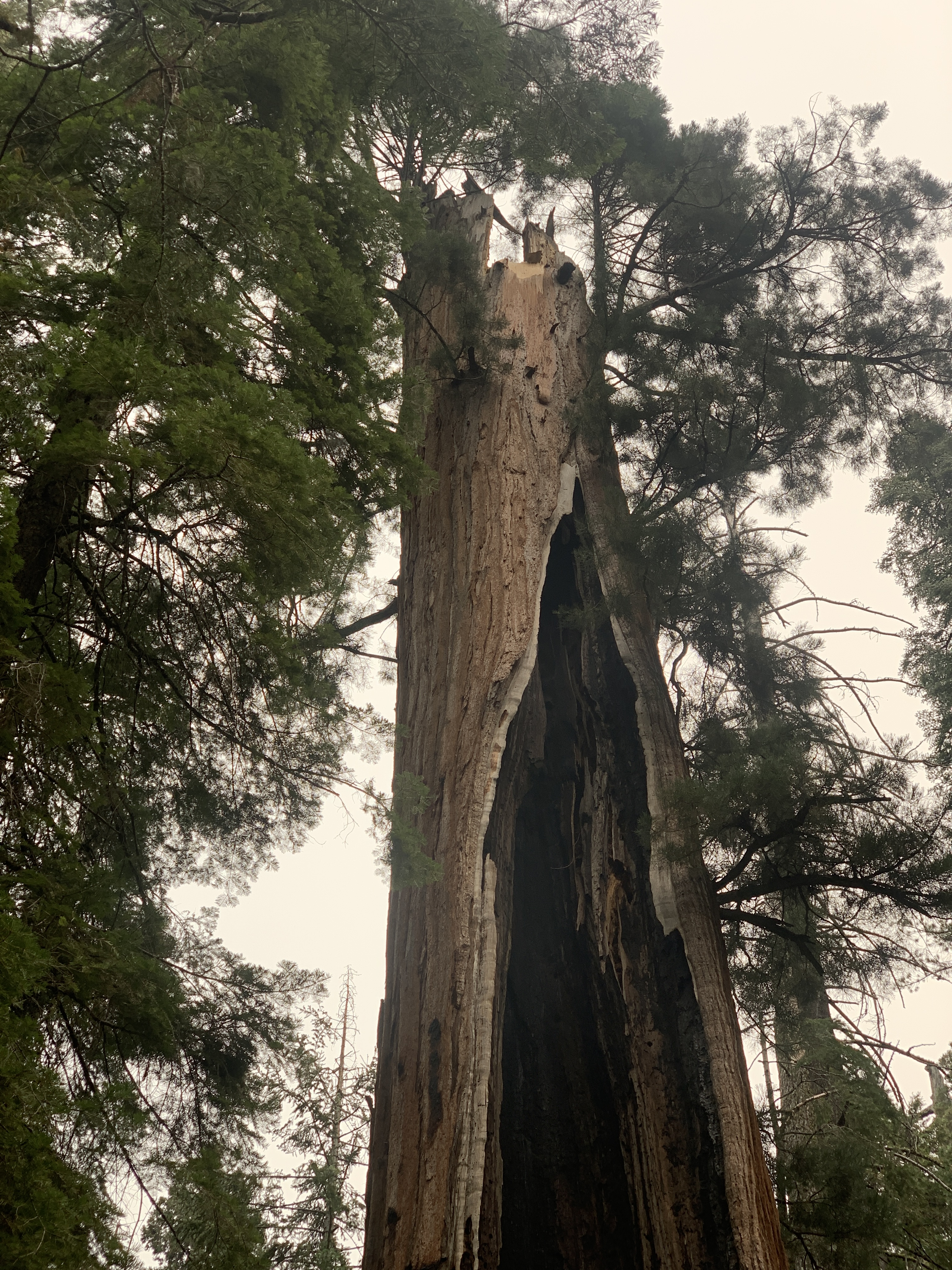
Giant Sequoia burned in fire of 1908 holding its ground

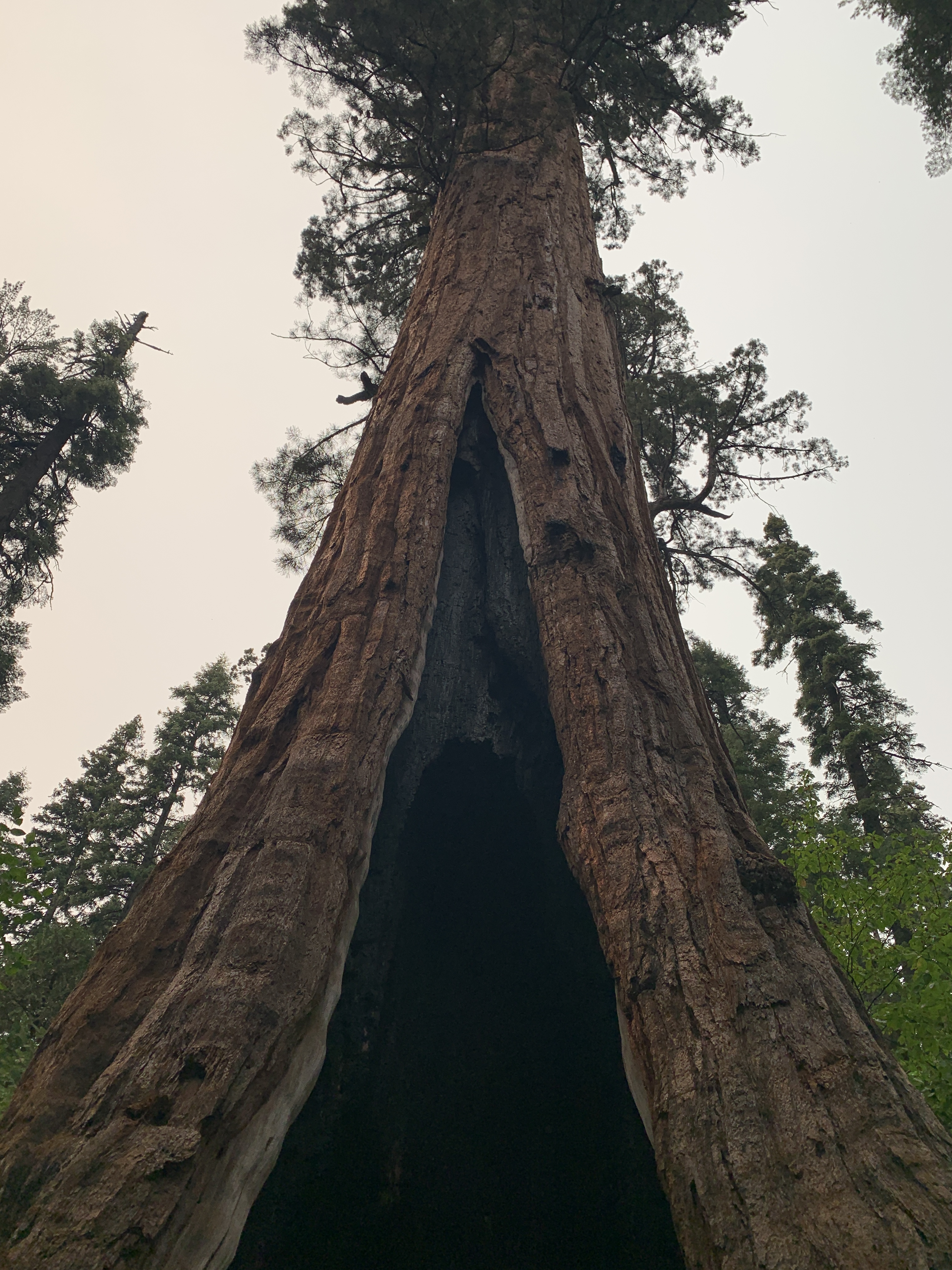
Palace Tree with large hollowed out trunk. Travellers have stuck nails on its internal trunk

== Activities ==
The park houses two main campgrounds with a total of 129 campsites, six picnic areas and hundreds of miles of established trails.

Other activities include cross-country skiing, evening ranger talks, numerous interpretive programs, environmental educational programs, junior ranger programs, hiking, mountain biking, bird watching and summer school activities for school children. Dogs are allowed on leash in developed areas like picnic sites, campgrounds, roads and fire roads (dirt). Dogs are not allowed on the designated trails, nor in the woods in general.

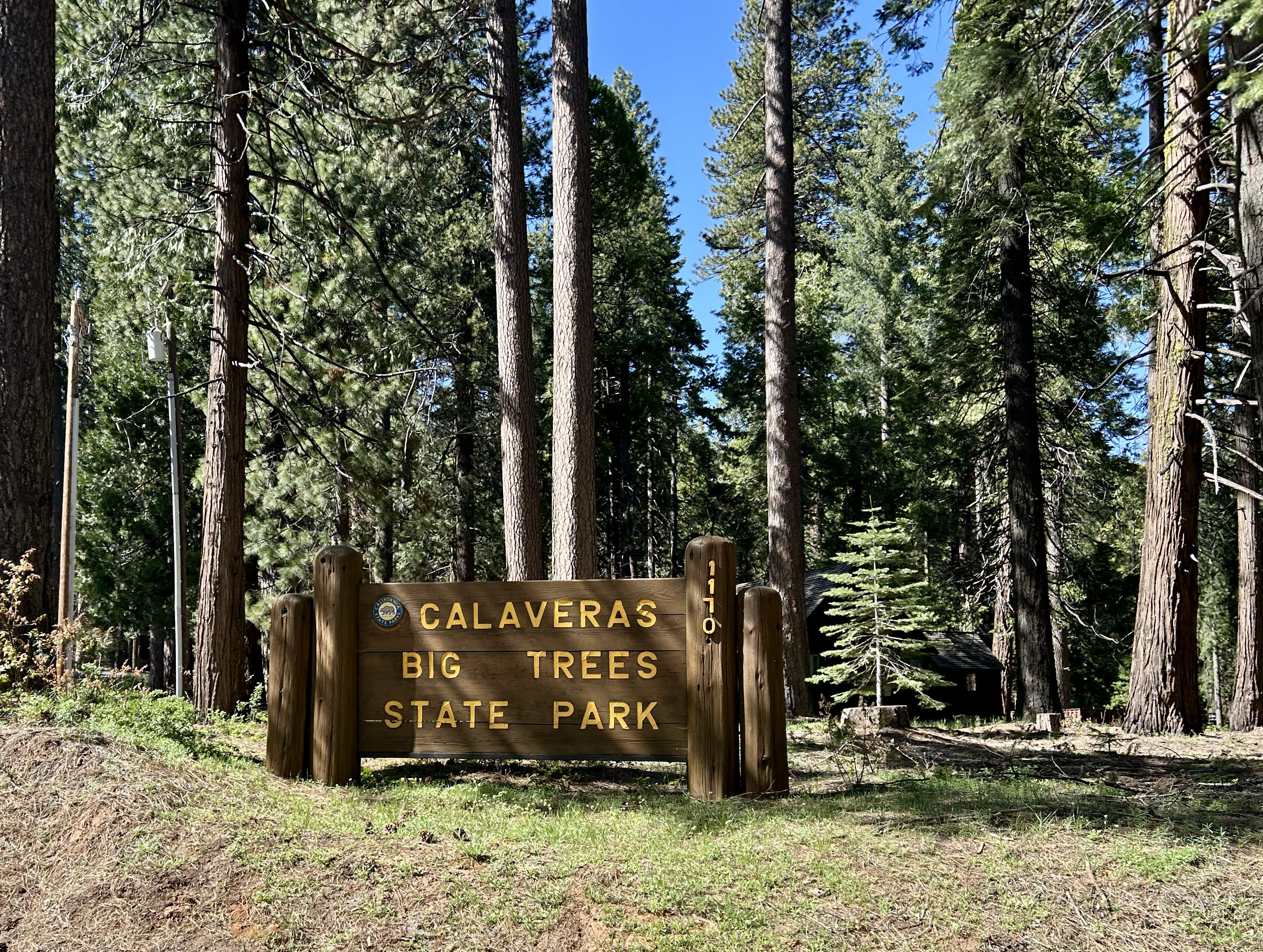
The sign at the entrance to the park alongside California State Route 4.

== Access ==
The park is open year-round. The main road through the park is closed during the winter season. The North Grove Area is easily accessible during the winter season. There are no public transportation options to the park. The closest bus stop is the Arnold Public Library in Arnold, California. The park is accessible via Upper Moran road at gate 15. There is no public parking so the access is used by foot, bicycle, snowshoe or cross-country ski.

== Climate ==
Calaveras Big Trees State Park has a warm-summer Mediterranean climate (Köppen climate classification Csb), featuring warm, dry summers and cool, wet winters. Winter is considered the wet season, having the most precipitation, but the total amount received fluctuates from year to year due to sea surface temperature anomalies in the Pacific Ocean such as the El Niño–Southern Oscillation (ENSO). During prolonged periods of low annual precipitation, drought conditions can occur. Such conditions notably contributed to the falling of the Pioneer Cabin Tree in 2017, and also render giant sequoias more vulnerable to the negative effects of bark beetle colonies. Snowfall is common between October and April and typically makes up around 25% of annual precipitation in the park. The little summer precipitation the park does receive typically comes with thunderstorms caused by North American monsoonal moisture originating in the Gulf of California.

Climate data for Calaveras Big Trees State Park (1991–2020 normals, extremes 1929–present)
Month	Jan	Feb	Mar	Apr	May	Jun	Jul	Aug	Sep	Oct	Nov	Dec	Year
Record high °F (°C)	73 (23)	82 (28)	82 (28)	88 (31)	93 (34)	100 (38)	107 (42)	106 (41)	106 (41)	94 (34)	89 (32)	78 (26)	107 (42)
Mean daily maximum °F (°C)	45.0 (7.2)	45.7 (7.6)	48.7 (9.3)	54.1 (12.3)	62.6 (17.0)	73.0 (22.8)	80.5 (26.9)	79.8 (26.6)	73.7 (23.2)	63.5 (17.5)	52.0 (11.1)	44.0 (6.7)	60.2 (15.7)
Daily mean °F (°C)	37.7 (3.2)	37.9 (3.3)	40.3 (4.6)	44.5 (6.9)	52.1 (11.2)	61.0 (16.1)	68.1 (20.1)	67.3 (19.6)	62.1 (16.7)	53.0 (11.7)	43.2 (6.2)	36.8 (2.7)	50.3 (10.2)
Mean daily minimum °F (°C)	30.4 (−0.9)	30.1 (−1.1)	31.8 (−0.1)	34.9 (1.6)	41.7 (5.4)	49.0 (9.4)	55.7 (13.2)	54.9 (12.7)	50.6 (10.3)	42.5 (5.8)	34.4 (1.3)	29.7 (−1.3)	40.5 (4.7)
Record low °F (°C)	1 (−17)	3 (−16)	8 (−13)	15 (−9)	21 (−6)	21 (−6)	31 (−1)	32 (0)	28 (−2)	20 (−7)	9 (−13)	0 (−18)	0 (−18)
Average precipitation inches (mm)	10.57 (268)	9.82 (249)	8.48 (215)	4.59 (117)	2.79 (71)	0.95 (24)	0.11 (2.8)	0.06 (1.5)	0.39 (9.9)	2.93 (74)	5.17 (131)	9.65 (245)	55.51 (1,410)
Average snowfall inches (cm)	19.3 (49)	25.9 (66)	19.2 (49)	11.4 (29)	2.2 (5.6)	0.1 (0.25)	0.0 (0.0)	0.0 (0.0)	0.0 (0.0)	0.3 (0.76)	7.7 (20)	18.7 (47)	104.8 (266)
Average precipitation days (≥ 0.01 in)	11.4	11.1	10.5	7.7	6.0	2.3	0.4	0.6	1.9	3.7	7.3	10.8	73.7
Average snowy days (≥ 0.1 in)	5.1	5.3	4.6	2.8	0.9	0.0	0.0	0.0	0.0	0.2	1.4	4.3	24.6
Source: NOAA

== See also ==
- Calaveras Big Tree National Forest
- Chandelier Tree - another tunnel tree, but a coast redwood not a giant sequoia
- List of giant sequoia groves
- List of California state parks
