= Discovery Tree =

Giant sequoia exhibition tree, cut down in Calaveras Grove, California

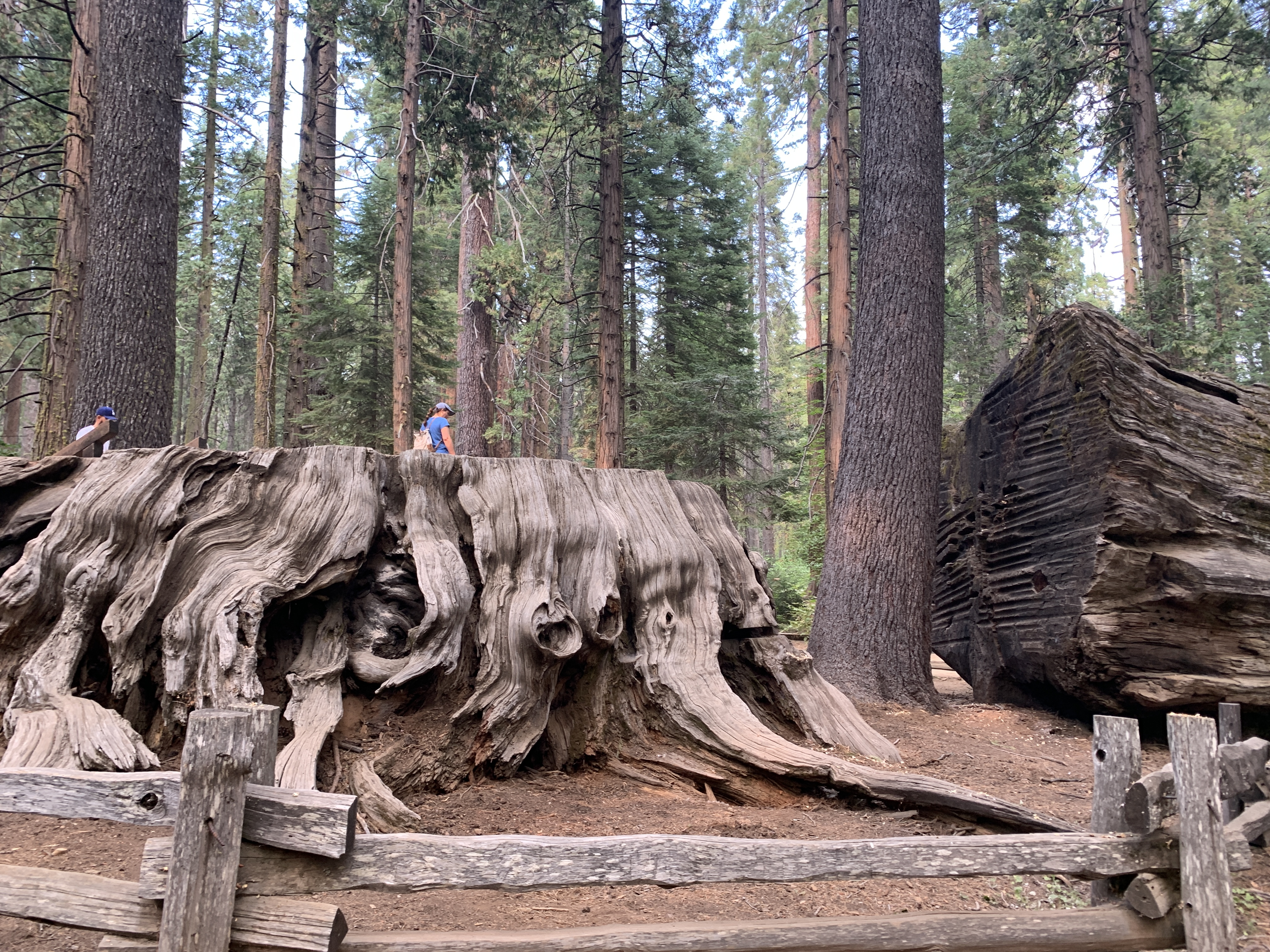
The Discovery Tree stump in Calaveras Big Trees State Park.

The Discovery Tree, also known as the Mammoth Tree, was a giant sequoia in the North Grove of what is now Calaveras Big Trees State Park, California. The tree became widely known after hunter Augustus T. Dowd brought the grove to wider attention in 1852. In 1853, promoter William H. Hanford had the tree felled for commercial exhibition; sections of its bark and trunk were displayed in San Francisco and later in New York City.

The destruction of the tree drew criticism and formed part of a wider public reaction to the exploitation of California's giant sequoias. The stump and portions of the fallen trunk remain in the North Grove, where they have been tourist attractions since the 1850s.

== Discovery ==
The giant sequoias of the Calaveras Grove were known to Native people before Euro-American settlement. The earliest documented Euro-American reference to giant sequoias dates to 1833, in the account of Zenas Leonard, a member of the Walker Party, although the grove he described is uncertain. John Bidwell apparently saw the Calaveras North Grove in 1841. California State Parks identifies the 1852 account of Augustus T. Dowd as the earliest undisputed description of the giant sequoias within the present-day park.

Dowd worked as a hunter for the Union Water Company, supplying meat to a crew constructing a water ditch near Murphys. According to the traditional account, he entered the North Grove while tracking a wounded grizzly bear and returned with reports of the enormous trees. His story was initially dismissed, but word of the grove soon spread through California and into the botanical community. The largest tree in the grove, which State Parks identifies as the first tree encountered by Dowd, became known as the Discovery Tree.

== Felling and exhibition ==
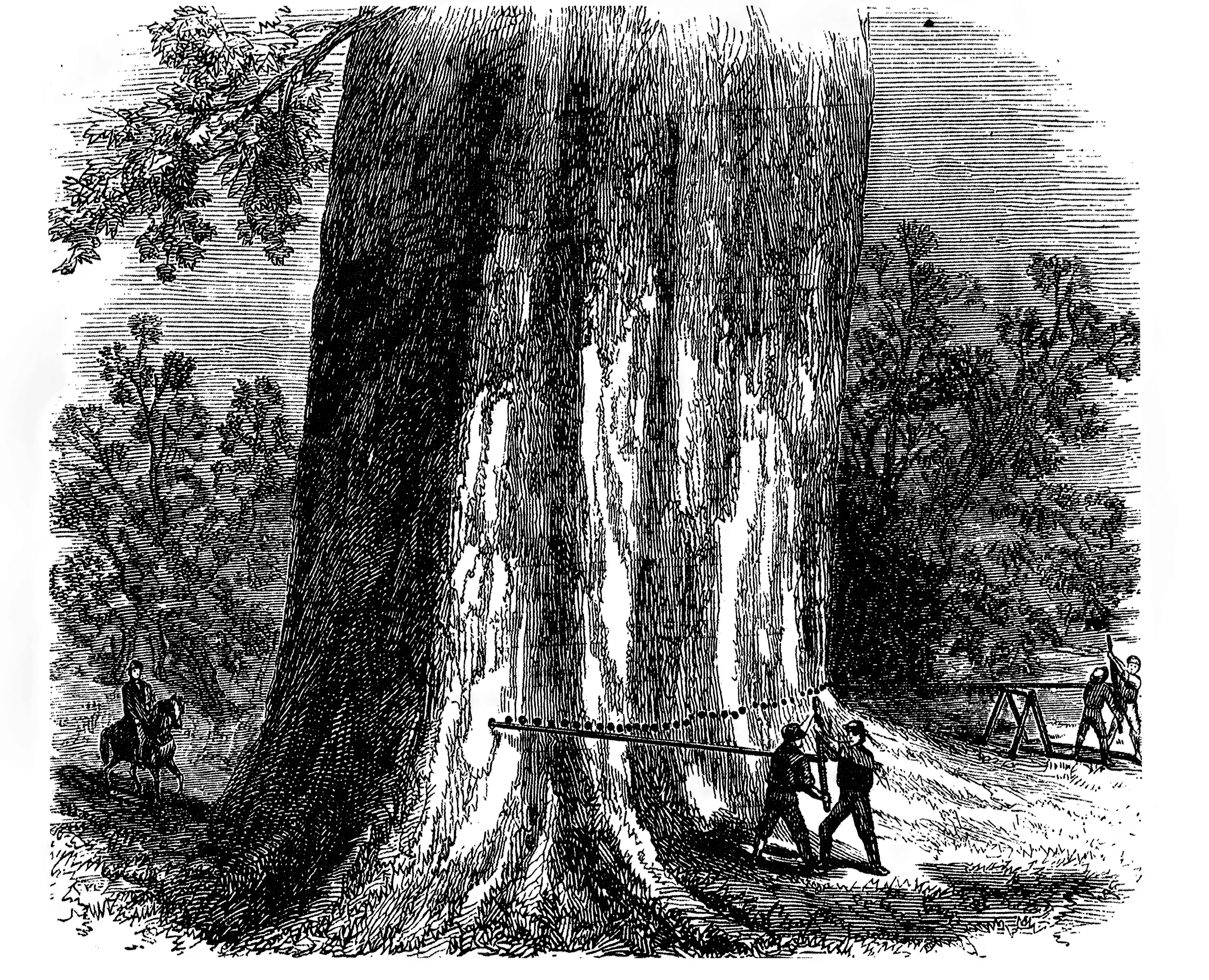
Workers felling the Discovery Tree with augers in 1853.

The size of the Calaveras trees quickly attracted interest in exhibiting them commercially. James Mason Hutchings later wrote that a man named Lewis, who had visited the grove with Dowd, proposed removing the bark from one of the trees and taking it to eastern cities for exhibition. By 1853, plans were underway to exhibit portions of one of the giant sequoias outside California.

Captain William H. Hanford, president of the Union Water Company, subsequently undertook a scheme to fell the Discovery Tree and exhibit portions of it commercially. Because no saw available was large enough to cut through the trunk, workers bored parallel holes through its base with pump augers and cut through the remaining wood. Five men worked for about three weeks before the tree fell on June 27, 1853. The stump measured approximately 25 feet (7.6 m) in diameter, and a count of its growth rings indicated that the tree was about 1,244 years old when felled.

Sections of bark and trunk were taken to San Francisco for exhibition. In September 1853, the San Joaquin Republican described the bark as having been reconstructed to reproduce the appearance of the standing tree. The Daily Alta California reported that a 20-foot (6.1 m)-high section of bark had been erected on Bush Street near Montgomery Street and measured 80 feet (24 m) in circumference.

Advertising for the Big Tree Exhibit on Broadway, 1854.

The exhibit was subsequently shipped around Cape Horn to New York City. In the spring of 1854 it was installed at the Racket Court adjoining the Metropolitan Hotel at 596 Broadway. An April 1854 notice in the New York Herald announced that the exhibit would open on May 8.

Hanford had initially hoped to exhibit the tree at the New York Crystal Palace, but he and its president, P. T. Barnum, did not reach an agreement. Barnum instead mounted a competing exhibit at the Crystal Palace using a coast redwood, which was also promoted as a California "mammoth tree". Hanford's Broadway exhibition was ultimately unsuccessful, with confusion between the competing displays contributing to its difficulties.

The remains of the Discovery Tree exhibit were later prepared for shipment to Paris but were destroyed by fire before the planned exhibition could take place.

== Legacy ==
The Discovery Tree stump and fallen trunk in 1864, photographed by Charles Leander Weed.

The destruction of the Discovery Tree drew criticism almost immediately. James Mason Hutchings, writing about the grove in 1859, called its felling a "sacrilegious act" and an "act of desecration". The felling and subsequent destruction of other giant sequoias at Calaveras became part of a wider public debate over preservation. John Muir later condemned the treatment of the tree in an essay titled The Vandals Then Danced Upon the Stump!

The Calaveras trees also figured in the debate over early protection of giant sequoias. In 1864, while arguing in the United States Senate for the bill that became the Yosemite Grant, Senator John Conness referred to sections of a felled tree from the Calaveras Grove that had been taken overseas for exhibition. Conness contrasted the exploitation of the Calaveras trees with the bill's purpose of protecting the Mariposa Grove from "devastation and injury". The Yosemite Grant, signed by President Abraham Lincoln on June 30, 1864, protected Yosemite Valley and the Mariposa Grove but did not include the Calaveras Grove.

The remains of the Discovery Tree continued to be used as tourist attractions. The stump was planed smooth, and on July 4, 1853, thirty-two people danced four sets of cotillions on it at the same time. A two-lane bowling alley and bar were later constructed on the fallen trunk. The stump and portions of the trunk remain in the North Grove.

In 1931, the North Grove became part of the newly established Calaveras Big Trees State Park, preserving the Discovery Tree stump and the surrounding giant sequoias.

== Dimensions ==
Height above base	287 ft	87.5 m
Circumference at ground	96 ft	29.3 m

== Bibliography ==
- Kruska, Dennis G. (1985). Sierra Nevada Big Trees: History of the Exhibitions, 1850-1903: Los Angeles, California: Dawson's Book Shop.
- Lowe, Gary D. (2004). The Big Tree Exhibits of 1870-1871 and the Roots of the Giant Sequoia Preservation Movement. Livermore, California: Lowebros Publishing.
