= Arnold, California =

Census-designated place in Calaveras County, California, United States

Arnold
- census-designated place
- Location in Calaveras County and the state of California

- Location in the United States
- Coordinates: 38°15′N 120°21′W
- Country: United States
- State: California
- County: Calaveras

Area
  - Total: 9.13 sq mi (23.65 km^{2})
  - Land: 9.07 sq mi (23.48 km^{2})
  - Water: 0.066 sq mi (0.17 km^{2}) 0.71%
- Elevation: 3,999 ft (1,219 m)

Population (2020)
  - Total: 3,288
  - Density: 362.7/sq mi (140.02/km^{2})
- Time zone: UTC−8 (Pacific (PST))
  - Summer (DST): UTC−7 (PDT)
- ZIP Code: 95223
- Area code: 209
- FIPS code: 06-02770
- GNIS feature IDs: 1656296, 2407763

Image from the center of Arnold, CA (view as a 360° interactive panorama)

Arnold is a census-designated place (CDP) in Calaveras County, California, United States. The population was 3,288 at the 2020 census. Arnold is located on State Route 4.

== History ==
Arnold is named after Bob and Bernice Arnold, who, in 1927 opened the Ebbetts Pass Inn. Prior to that, the community consisted of two large ranches where logging was the main industry. The inn served as a stop for people traveling along the Ebbetts Pass route as well as lodging for those visiting nearby Calaveras Big Trees State Park. In 1928, Camp Wolfeboro was established nearby as a Boy Scout camp and continues to be in operation today. The first post office was opened in 1934. Bernice was its postmistress at one time.

In 2015 power lines sparked the Butte Fire, which destroyed 549 homes in nearby communities. Arnold was saved when the weather changed, but the fire caused an increased focus on fire safety, although the community was still, in 2019, considered a "very high fire hazard severity zone" due to its location on a ridge outside Calaveras Big Trees State Park, surrounded by dense forest of trees killed by drought and beetles.

== Geography ==
According to the United States Census Bureau, the CDP has a total area of 9.1 square miles (24 km^{2}), of which 9.1 square miles (24 km^{2}) is land and 0.1 square miles (0.3 km^{2}) (0.71%) is water.

Arnold is considered at high risk of wildfire by CalFire due to its forested ridgetop location with powerful wind gusts up brushy canyons.

=== Climate ===
Area has a Köppen Climate Classification of Csb, which is a dry-summer subtropical climate often referred to as "Mediterranean".

Climate data for Calaveras Big Trees State Park (1991–2020 normals, extremes 1929–present)
Month	Jan	Feb	Mar	Apr	May	Jun	Jul	Aug	Sep	Oct	Nov	Dec	Year
Record high °F (°C)	73 (23)	82 (28)	82 (28)	88 (31)	93 (34)	100 (38)	107 (42)	106 (41)	106 (41)	94 (34)	89 (32)	78 (26)	107 (42)
Mean maximum °F (°C)	57 (14)	59 (15)	61 (16)	71 (22)	79 (26)	86 (30)	90 (32)	89 (32)	85 (29)	77 (25)	65 (18)	57 (14)	90 (32)
Mean daily maximum °F (°C)	45.0 (7.2)	45.7 (7.6)	48.7 (9.3)	54.1 (12.3)	62.6 (17.0)	73.0 (22.8)	80.5 (26.9)	79.8 (26.6)	73.7 (23.2)	63.5 (17.5)	52.0 (11.1)	44.0 (6.7)	60.2 (15.7)
Daily mean °F (°C)	37.5 (3.1)	37.9 (3.3)	40.3 (4.6)	44.5 (6.9)	52.1 (11.2)	61.0 (16.1)	68.1 (20.1)	67.3 (19.6)	62.1 (16.7)	53.0 (11.7)	43.2 (6.2)	36.8 (2.7)	50.3 (10.2)
Mean daily minimum °F (°C)	29.7 (−1.3)	30.0 (−1.1)	31.8 (−0.1)	34.9 (1.6)	41.7 (5.4)	49.0 (9.4)	55.7 (13.2)	54.9 (12.7)	50.6 (10.3)	42.5 (5.8)	34.4 (1.3)	29.7 (−1.3)	40.5 (4.7)
Mean minimum °F (°C)	17 (−8)	19 (−7)	21 (−6)	25 (−4)	30 (−1)	36 (2)	46 (8)	46 (8)	39 (4)	31 (−1)	23 (−5)	18 (−8)	15 (−9)
Record low °F (°C)	1 (−17)	3 (−16)	8 (−13)	15 (−9)	21 (−6)	21 (−6)	31 (−1)	32 (0)	28 (−2)	20 (−7)	9 (−13)	0 (−18)	0 (−18)
Average precipitation inches (mm)	10.57 (268)	9.82 (249)	8.48 (215)	4.59 (117)	2.79 (71)	0.95 (24)	0.11 (2.8)	0.06 (1.5)	0.39 (9.9)	2.93 (74)	5.17 (131)	9.65 (245)	55.51 (1,410)
Average snowfall inches (cm)	19.3 (49)	25.9 (66)	19.2 (49)	11.4 (29)	2.2 (5.6)	0.1 (0.25)	0.0 (0.0)	0.0 (0.0)	0.0 (0.0)	0.3 (0.76)	7.7 (20)	18.7 (47)	104.8 (266)
Average precipitation days (≥ 0.01 in)	11.4	11.1	10.5	7.7	6.0	2.3	0.4	0.6	1.9	3.7	7.3	10.8	73.7
Average snowy days (≥ 0.1 in)	5.1	5.3	4.6	2.8	0.9	0.0	0.0	0.0	0.0	0.2	1.4	4.3	24.6
Source: NOAA

== Demographics ==
Historical population
Census	Pop.	Note	%±
1980	2,385		—
1990	3,788		58.8%
2000	4,218		11.4%
2010	3,843		−8.9%
2020	3,288		−14.4%
U.S. Decennial Census; 1860–1870 1880-1890; 1900 1910 1920; 1930 1940 1950; 1960 1970 1980; 1990 2000 2010

Arnold first appeared as a census-designated place in the 1980 United States census.

=== 2020 census ===
As of the 2020 census, Arnold had a population of 3,288. The population density was 362.6 inhabitants per square mile (140.0/km^{2}). The whole population lived in households.

0.0% of residents lived in urban areas, while 100.0% lived in rural areas.

There were 1,526 households, out of which 21.1% included children under the age of 18, 51.5% were married-couple households, 6.6% were cohabiting couple households, 21.3% had a female householder with no partner present, and 20.6% had a male householder with no partner present. 27.8% of households were one person, and 16.8% were one person aged 65 or older. The average household size was 2.15. There were 1,012 families (66.3% of all households).

The age distribution was 15.5% under the age of 18, 4.6% aged 18 to 24, 17.1% aged 25 to 44, 27.5% aged 45 to 64, and 35.3% who were 65 years of age or older. The median age was 57.3 years. For every 100 females, there were 103.0 males, and for every 100 females age 18 and over there were 103.6 males age 18 and over.

There were 4,680 housing units at an average density of 516.2 units per square mile (199.3 units/km^{2}), of which 1,526 (32.6%) were occupied and 67.4% were vacant. Of occupied units, 80.3% were owner-occupied and 19.7% were occupied by renters. The homeowner vacancy rate was 2.4% and the rental vacancy rate was 3.8%.

Racial composition as of the 2020 census
Race	Number	Percent
White	2,849	86.6%
Black or African American	3	0.1%
American Indian and Alaska Native	10	0.3%
Asian	45	1.4%
Native Hawaiian and Other Pacific Islander	5	0.2%
Some other race	77	2.3%
Two or more races	299	9.1%
Hispanic or Latino (of any race)	291	8.9%

=== Housing ===
As many as 45% of the dwellings are vacation homes, a factor in fire safety efforts, as absent owners do not always clear the brush from their properties.

== Economy ==
Arnold has a chamber of commerce, the Greater Arnold Business Association.

== Parks and recreation ==
Arnold is located in Stanislaus National Forest. Parks located in the area include White Pines Park and Calaveras Big Trees State Park. The Arnold Rim Trail, which was created in 2007, is a 17.5 mile multi-use trail that traverses protected land from Arnold to Avery.

== Government ==
In the state legislature, Arnold is in the 4th senatorial district, represented by Republican Marie Alvarado-Gil, and the 8th Assembly district, represented by Republican David Tangipa. Federally, Arnold is in California's 5th congressional district, represented by Republican Tom McClintock.

State and federal grants following the Butte Fire have helped to thin overgrown brush in the area, and expand a bulldozed fire break created in the Butte Fire.
