= General Sherman Tree =

Giant sequoia in Giant Forest, California

General Sherman
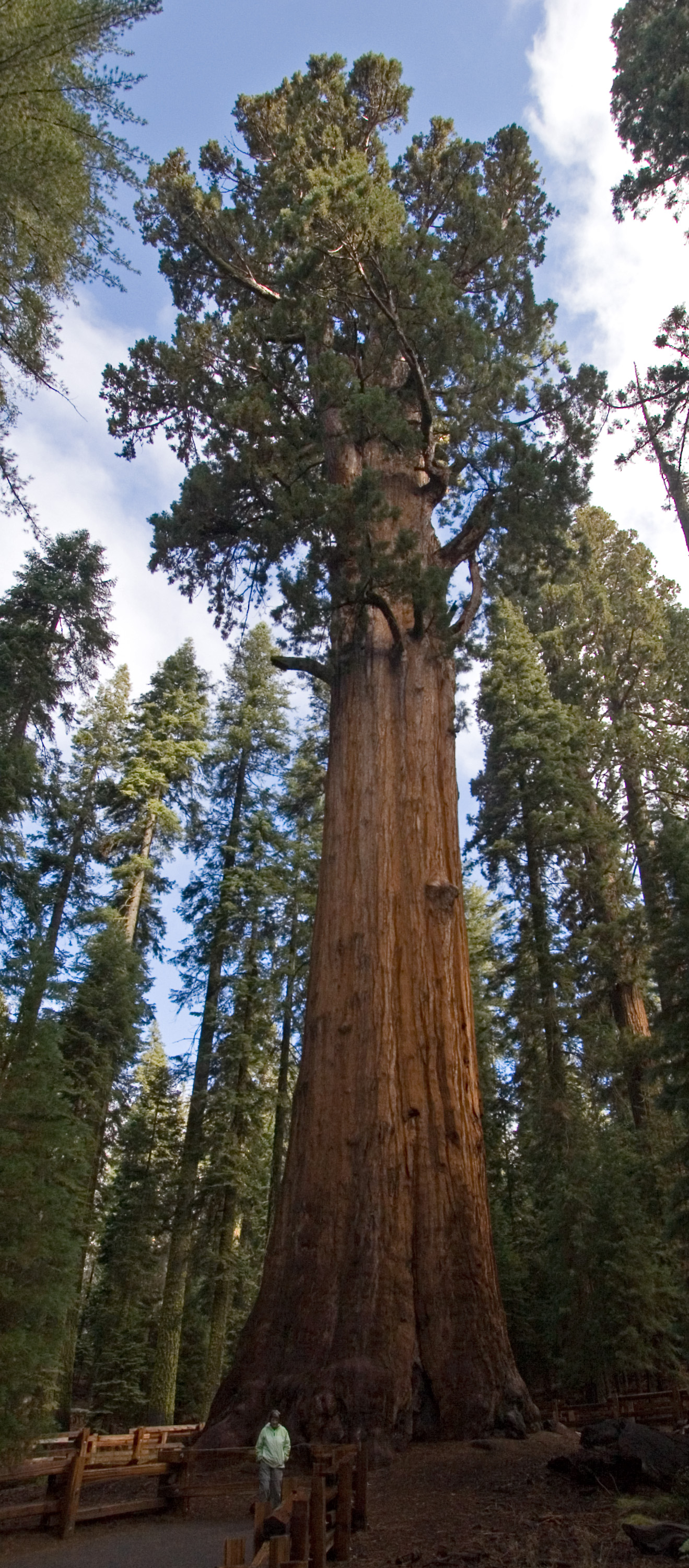

- Location within California
- Species: Giant sequoia (Sequoiadendron giganteum)
- Coordinates: 36°34′54″N 118°45′05.5″W
- Height: 83.8 m (275 ft)
- Diameter: 7.7 m (25 ft)
- Volume of trunk: 1,487 m^{3} (52,500 ft^{3})
- Date seeded: 700 BC – 300 BC

The General Sherman Tree is a giant sequoia (Sequoiadendron giganteum) tree in the Giant Forest of Sequoia National Park in Tulare County, California. By volume, it is the largest known living single-stem tree on Earth.

== History ==
The General Sherman Tree was named after the American Civil War general William Tecumseh Sherman. The official story, which may be apocryphal, claims the tree was named in 1879 by naturalist James Wolverton, who had served as a lieutenant in the 9th Indiana Cavalry under Sherman.

Seven years later, in 1886, the land came under the control of the Kaweah Colony, a utopian socialist community whose economy was based on logging. Noting the pivotal role that Sherman had played in the Indian Wars and his forced relocation of native American tribes, they renamed the tree in honor of Karl Marx. However, the community was disbanded in 1892, primarily as a result of the establishment of Sequoia National Park, and the tree reverted to its previous name.

In 1931, following comparisons with the nearby General Grant Tree, General Sherman was identified as the largest tree in the world. One result of this process was that wood volume became widely accepted as the standard for establishing and comparing the size of different trees.

In January 2006, the largest branch on the tree (seen most commonly, in older photos, as an "L" or golf-club shape, protruding from about a quarter of the way down the trunk) broke off. There were no witnesses to the incident, and the branch‍—‌with a diameter of over 2 m (6.6 ft) and a length of over 30 m (98 ft), larger than most tree trunks‍—‌smashed part of the perimeter fence and cratered the pavement of the surrounding walkway. The breakage is not believed to be indicative of any abnormalities in the tree's health and may even be a natural defense mechanism against adverse weather conditions.

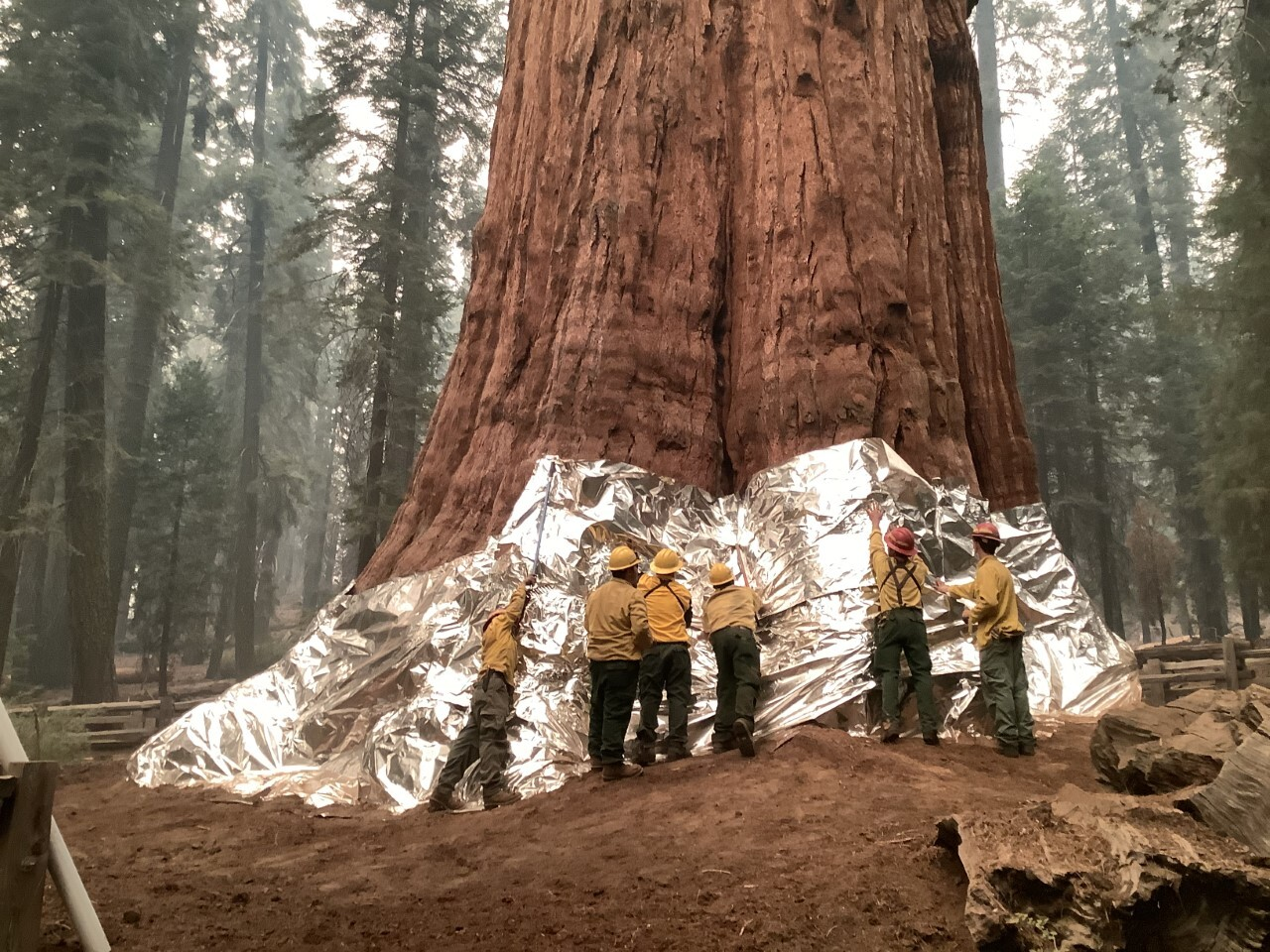
Firefighters and park personnel wrap General Sherman in fire shelter material to help protect it from the KNP Complex Fire in 2021.

On September 16, 2021, the tree was threatened by the KNP Complex Fire in Sequoia National Park. Park and firefighting personnel wrapped the tree's base in a protective foil usually used on structures in case the wildfire approached the General Sherman Tree‍—‌which, in the end, was left unharmed.

== Dimensions ==
While it is the largest tree known, the General Sherman tree is neither the tallest known living tree on Earth (that distinction belongs to Hyperion, a coast redwood), nor is it the widest (both the largest cypress and largest baobab have a greater diameter), nor is it the oldest known living tree on Earth (that distinction belonged to Prometheus, a Great Basin bristlecone pine, until it was cut down in 1964). With a height of 83.8 m (275 ft), a diameter of 7.7 m (25 ft), an estimated bole volume of 1,487 cubic meters (52,513 ft^{3}), and an estimated age of 2,300–2,700 years, it is nevertheless among the tallest, widest, and longest-lived of all trees on the planet.

While General Sherman is the largest living tree, it is not the largest historically recorded tree. The Crannell Creek Giant, a coast redwood (Sequoia sempervirens) cut down in the mid-1940s near Trinidad, California, is estimated to have been 15–25% larger than the General Sherman Tree by volume. Similarly, the Mother of the Forest, another giant sequoia, may have historically been larger than General Sherman. Two other historical and exceedingly enormous giant sequoias, the Discovery Tree with a near-30 meters (98 ft) circumference, and especially the long-fallen "Father of the Forest" from Calaveras Grove, reportedly 435 feet (133 m) high and 110 feet (34 m) in circumference, are widely considered to have once been larger than General Sherman. In addition, the Burnt Monarch from Big Stump Grove had a much larger base than General Sherman and could have easily been larger as well.

Measurement	Imperial units	SI units
Height above base	274.9 ft	83.8 m
Circumference at ground	102.6 ft	31.3 m
Maximum diameter at base	36.5 ft	11.1 m
Diameter 4.50 ft (1.37 m) above base	25.1 ft	7.7 m
Diameter 60 ft (18 m) above base	17.5 ft	5.3 m
Diameter 180 ft (55 m) above base	14.0 ft	4.3 m
Diameter of largest branch	6.8 ft	2.1 m
Height of first large branch above the base	130.0 ft	39.6 m
Average crown spread	106.5 ft	32.5 m
Estimated bole volume	52,508 ft^{3}	1,487 m^{3}
Estimated mass (wet) (1938)	2,105 short tons	1,910 t
Estimated bole mass (1938)	2,472,000 lb	1,121 t

== See also ==
- List of largest giant sequoias
- List of superlative trees
- List of individual trees
- List of oldest trees
- National Register of Big Trees
