= General Grant Grove =

Giant sequoia grove located in Kings Canyon National Park

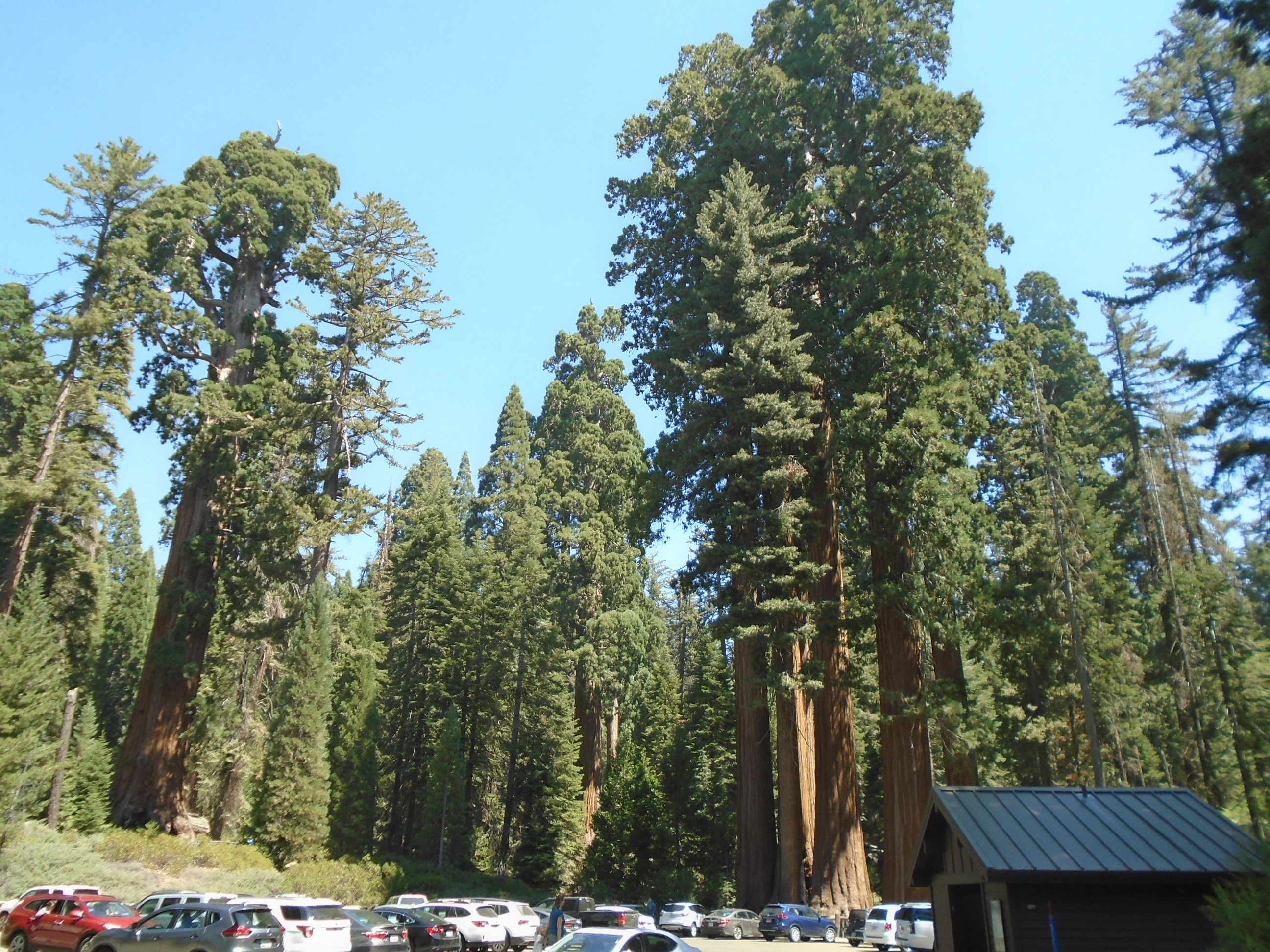
- General Grant Grove in August 2018

- Location within California

Geography
- Location: Kings Canyon National Park, California, United States
- Coordinates: 36°44′48″N 118°58′33″W
- Elevation: 5,740–6,560 ft (1,750–2,000 m)

Ecology
- Dominant tree species: Sequoiadendron giganteum

General Grant Grove, a section of the greater Kings Canyon National Park, was established by the U.S. Congress in 1890 and is located in Fresno County, California. The primary attraction of General Grant Grove is the giant sequoia trees that populate the grove. General Grant Grove's best-known tree is called General Grant, which is 267 ft (81 m) tall and the third-largest known tree in the world. (Note: Traditionally, the size of a sequoia has been measured by calculating the volume of the tree's trunk. Using this metric, General Grant is the second-largest known tree in the world, while The President tree is the third-largest. A 2011–12 study of the President found that, if the volume of a tree's branches is taken into account, the President is larger than General Grant.) The General Grant tree is over 1,500 years old and is known as the United States' national Christmas tree. General Grant Grove consists of 154 acres (0.62 km^{2}) and is geographically isolated from the rest of Kings Canyon National Park.

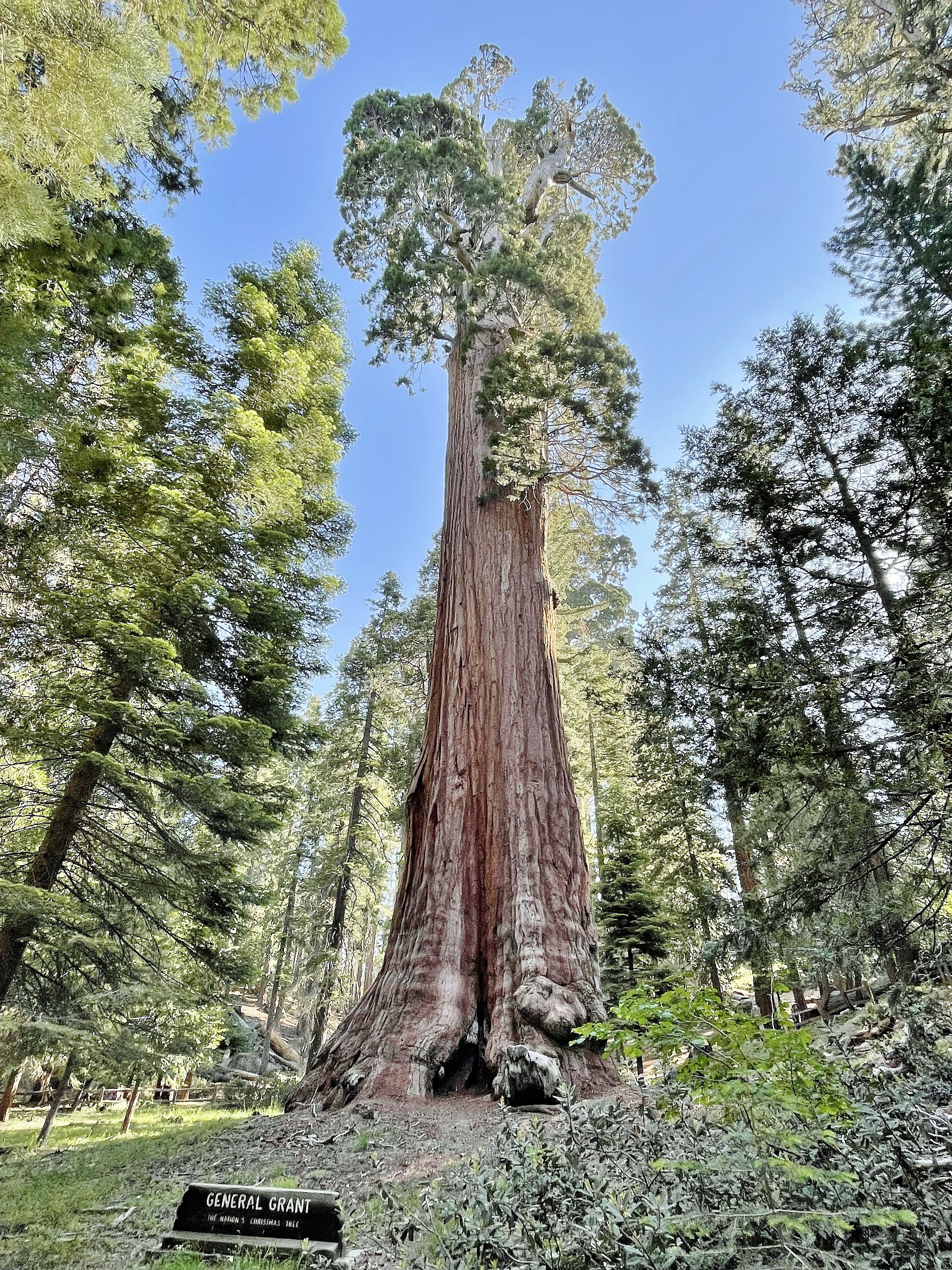
General Grant tree (July 2023)

== History ==
The original inhabitants of what is today General Grant Grove and Kings Canyon National Park were natives of the Shoshonean language group. The Monache, Tübatulabal, and Yokuts were the primary native groups of the region. In 1846, Hale Tharp, a disenchanted miner who hoped to establish a cattle ranch in the region, became the first white settler to enter the Giant Forest that would later constitute Sequoia and Kings Canyon National Parks. Tharp carved a shelter out of a fallen sequoia tree and began to raise cattle. Initially, Native Americans of the region welcomed Tharp, as he helped them hunt and coexisted peacefully among them. Tharp's settlement in the Giant Forest, however, spurred further human interest in the region, and the native population began to contract contagious diseases from incoming white settlers. Tharp claimed that the natives pleaded with him to help them prevent white settlers from entering the valley. When Tharp told them this was impossible, the natives elected to leave the valley. By 1865, within twenty years of Tharp's arrival in the Giant Forest, the natives of the region had moved elsewhere and the Giant Forest was open to timber companies and cattle ranchers. With the growing presence of timber and cattle interests, conservationists began to advocate for the preservation of the region. In 1873, John Muir, a renowned naturalist, hiked from Yosemite to the Giant Forest. After the hike, Muir began advocating for federal protection of the canyon.

=== Park establishment and early battles ===
Because of the sequoia's size and durability, the Giant Forest was a region of particular value to loggers. The Kaweah Colony, a socialist colony which lived in the forest until 1892, hoped to profit from lumber production and constructed the first road in the park. Lumber interests did not have a stranglehold on the region, however. The federal government ensured protection of the General Grant Tree in 1880, when it withdrew from sale four acres of land surrounding the tree.

Advocacy for protection of the forest gained traction in the 1870s when agricultural interests in the Central Valley sought to end the harmful practices of sheep herders and lumber companies. Local farmers objected to the economic exploitation of the canyon on two levels. First, grazing and lumbering resulted in runoff which impacted farming in nearby towns. Second, locals feared that habitat loss would detract from their scenic and recreational enjoyment of the wilderness. On October 1, 1890, in response to pressure from agricultural interests from citizens in towns such as Visalia and conservationists such as John Muir, who wrote a number of articles in journals describing the lands' beauty, Congress passed a bill that established Yosemite, Sequoia, and General Grant national parks.

Tourism in General Grant National Park was limited in its early years. Utilizing the road built by the Kaweah Colony, early tourists camped in the park using tents and temporary shelters. In subsequent years, accommodations and lodgings were constructed to attract visitors. Initially, General Grant National Park was under the supervision of the State of California and protection of the U.S. Army. State officials oversaw tourist issues, while the Army was responsible for park protection. Despite only receiving $8,000 to protect all three California National Parks, the Army protected the parks effectively in its early years. In 1906, the State of California ceded control of the park to the federal government and in 1916, the establishment of the National Park Service permanently placed management of the park with the newly created National Park Service.

Even after the establishment of General Grant National Park, private interests sought to profit from the resources within the park. Officials from Los Angeles County hoped to use the park's major rivers, the Kings, Kern, and Kaweah, to harness hydroelectric power for the city, but locals remained wary of the environmental impact of damming. The Mt. Whitney Power Company began development of power stations along the rivers in 1898, and hoped to eventually dam the three rivers to provide power. The 1920 Federal Power Act allowed the federal government to license private corporations to develop water and power projects on public lands. Following the Federal Power Act, the City of Los Angeles filed to build dams on the rivers both within park boundaries and outside the park. The City of Los Angeles' plan was met with extensive resistance from locals, however. Residents of the San Joaquin Valley spearheaded the resistance to the proposed dam. After three years, the City of Los Angeles' petition to dam the park's rivers was rejected. However, the fight to prevent the damming of the rivers continued through 1965, when all of Kings Canyon was protected from hydroelectric development.

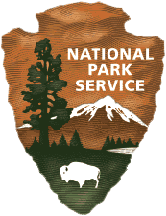
National Park Service logo

=== Creation of Kings Canyon National Park and recent history ===
In 1940, General Grant Grove became a section of the newly created Kings Canyon National Park, thanks to the combined efforts of Harold Ickes, Secretary of the Interior, the Sierra Club, and Congress. Kings Canyon National Park included General Grant Grove and Kings Valley, an area that had been outside the protection of General Grant National Park. In order to gain support for the park, Secretary Ickes commissioned naturalist photographer and Sierra Club member Ansel Adams to photograph the area. Adams' photography convinced Congress to sign into law the bill that established Kings Canyon as a national park, with General Grant Grove being annexed into the park's boundaries. Fusing Kings Canyon with General Grant Grove allowed the National Park Service to strengthen the protection and management of the sequoias in both.

After World War II, the National Park Service expanded its function to include a new endeavor: scientific research. The Leopold Report, published by Dr. Starker Leopold in 1963, advocated returning the nations' remaining wilderness to conditions similar to those encountered by the first white settlers of North America. In order to do so, the Leopold Report stressed the need to hire scientists to conduct research and maintain the ecosystems within the park. In Sequoia and Kings Canyon, the effects of the Leopold report were felt immediately. Newly hired scientists conducted studies measuring the human impacts on the Giant Forest, overgrazing by deer, and the danger present to threatened species. By 1971, Kings Canyon had a chief scientist, botanist, and several research assistants on staff conducting research that would both preserve the sequoias and provide academic information for future generations.

By 1982, park officials began to focus on the deteriorating quality of accommodations in General Grant Grove. Little improvements had been made to the cabins in Grant Grove in the past half century, and park management hoped improving facilities would increase park attendance. The National Park Service drafted an Environmental Impact Statement detailing their plans to expand accommodations in Grant Grove. The National Park Service outlined two options of action. One involved improving existing facilities and the other included adding ninety-eight additional units for tourists. Eventually, the park elected to construct additional units in Grant Grove and improve accommodations on the existing units.

The cabins of the Giant Forest Lodge Historic District, a 31 mile drive away, had been placed on the National Register of Historic Places in 1978. Because of their negative impact on the trees, the cabins were demolished between 1997 and 2000. The site was restored to a natural state.

In 2015, the Rough Fire burned through the northern section of the grove and killed 12 trees with diameters greater than 4 ft (1.2 m).

== Climate ==
General Grant Grove has a warm-summer Mediterranean climate (Csb). It is characterized by dry summers that are warm during the day and cool during the night. Winters are wet and cool, with frequent rain and snow and nighttime temperatures dropping below freezing.

Climate data for Grant Grove, California, 1991–2020 normals, extremes 1940–present
Month	Jan	Feb	Mar	Apr	May	Jun	Jul	Aug	Sep	Oct	Nov	Dec	Year
Record high °F (°C)	67 (19)	69 (21)	69 (21)	75 (24)	83 (28)	90 (32)	91 (33)	90 (32)	89 (32)	82 (28)	75 (24)	70 (21)	91 (33)
Mean maximum °F (°C)	58.8 (14.9)	58.8 (14.9)	61.2 (16.2)	67.1 (19.5)	74.0 (23.3)	81.7 (27.6)	85.9 (29.9)	85.4 (29.7)	81.4 (27.4)	74.2 (23.4)	65.9 (18.8)	59.6 (15.3)	87.4 (30.8)
Mean daily maximum °F (°C)	46.2 (7.9)	46.0 (7.8)	48.3 (9.1)	51.8 (11.0)	59.8 (15.4)	70.7 (21.5)	78.8 (26.0)	78.5 (25.8)	72.7 (22.6)	62.6 (17.0)	52.5 (11.4)	45.5 (7.5)	59.5 (15.3)
Daily mean °F (°C)	35.9 (2.2)	35.5 (1.9)	37.8 (3.2)	41.0 (5.0)	48.7 (9.3)	58.2 (14.6)	65.6 (18.7)	65.4 (18.6)	60.1 (15.6)	50.7 (10.4)	42.2 (5.7)	35.4 (1.9)	48.0 (8.9)
Mean daily minimum °F (°C)	25.7 (−3.5)	25.0 (−3.9)	27.2 (−2.7)	30.2 (−1.0)	37.6 (3.1)	45.7 (7.6)	52.5 (11.4)	52.3 (11.3)	47.4 (8.6)	38.8 (3.8)	31.9 (−0.1)	25.4 (−3.7)	36.6 (2.6)
Mean minimum °F (°C)	12.4 (−10.9)	13.0 (−10.6)	14.1 (−9.9)	16.7 (−8.5)	25.9 (−3.4)	32.6 (0.3)	44.4 (6.9)	43.3 (6.3)	34.8 (1.6)	26.5 (−3.1)	18.8 (−7.3)	12.6 (−10.8)	8.1 (−13.3)
Record low °F (°C)	−6 (−21)	−4 (−20)	0 (−18)	6 (−14)	13 (−11)	22 (−6)	25 (−4)	27 (−3)	21 (−6)	11 (−12)	8 (−13)	−4 (−20)	−6 (−21)
Average precipitation inches (mm)	8.03 (204)	7.33 (186)	7.81 (198)	3.58 (91)	1.37 (35)	0.53 (13)	0.27 (6.9)	0.16 (4.1)	0.32 (8.1)	2.37 (60)	3.26 (83)	6.63 (168)	41.66 (1,057.1)
Average snowfall inches (cm)	37.7 (96)	44.8 (114)	35.1 (89)	20.0 (51)	4.9 (12)	0.6 (1.5)	0.0 (0.0)	0.0 (0.0)	0.0 (0.0)	3.5 (8.9)	8.6 (22)	30.8 (78)	186.0 (472)
Average precipitation days (≥ 0.01 in)	8.7	10.5	9.5	7.5	4.6	1.9	1.2	0.9	1.8	3.7	5.7	8.2	64.2
Average snowy days (≥ 0.1 in)	7.3	8.0	6.8	5.4	2.2	0.3	0.0	0.0	0.0	1.0	3.2	6.4	40.6
Source: NOAA

== Environmental concerns ==
=== Vandalism and early issues ===
Even though few visitors traveled to General Grant National Park in its early years, incidents of vandalism were common from the park's inception. Tourists often carved their names into trees and shot arrows into them. The General Grant Tree, the largest in the grove, fell victim to the most vandalism. In order to combat these incidents, the United States Army fenced off the major trees. Sheep overgrazing was another early problem that plagued General Grant National Park. Grazing sheep posed a major threat to the ecosystem of the parks, as sheep overgrazed and killed plant species within park limits. Army officials prevented overgrazing by kicking intruding ranchers and sheep out of the park.

=== Fire management, a brief history ===
Fire management has always been a vital issue in park management, although fire policy has changed dramatically since the park's inception. While current management practices in General Grant Grove include prescribed burns, fire suppression was actively followed in the park's early years. In fact, the Army practiced active suppression of fires from the groves' inception, which resulted in a brush buildup throughout the grove. In electing to suppress fires, the Army kept with early 20th century practices of fire control. Since consistent fire maintains the health of a forest ecosystem, the Army and the State of California's practice of fire suppression endangered the grove risk of extensive habitat loss through fire. The creation of the National Park Service in 1916 did not alter fire control policies. The Leopold Report, however, soon did transform fire policy in Kings Canyon. In fact, Dr. Leopold used the sequoia groves in Kings Canyon as evidence of the need for proscribed burning and improved management practices. The 1964 Wilderness Act confirmed the findings of the Leopold Report and mandated controlled burning in the national parks and national forests, including Kings Canyon. As such, the National Park Service reintroduced fire into the grove as a natural process to prevent brush build up. By 1972, Kings Canyon had implemented a prescribed burn plan that spanned the entire park, including General Grant Grove. Controlled burns today remain a vital part of the National Park Service's efforts to manage Kings Canyon and General Grant Grove.

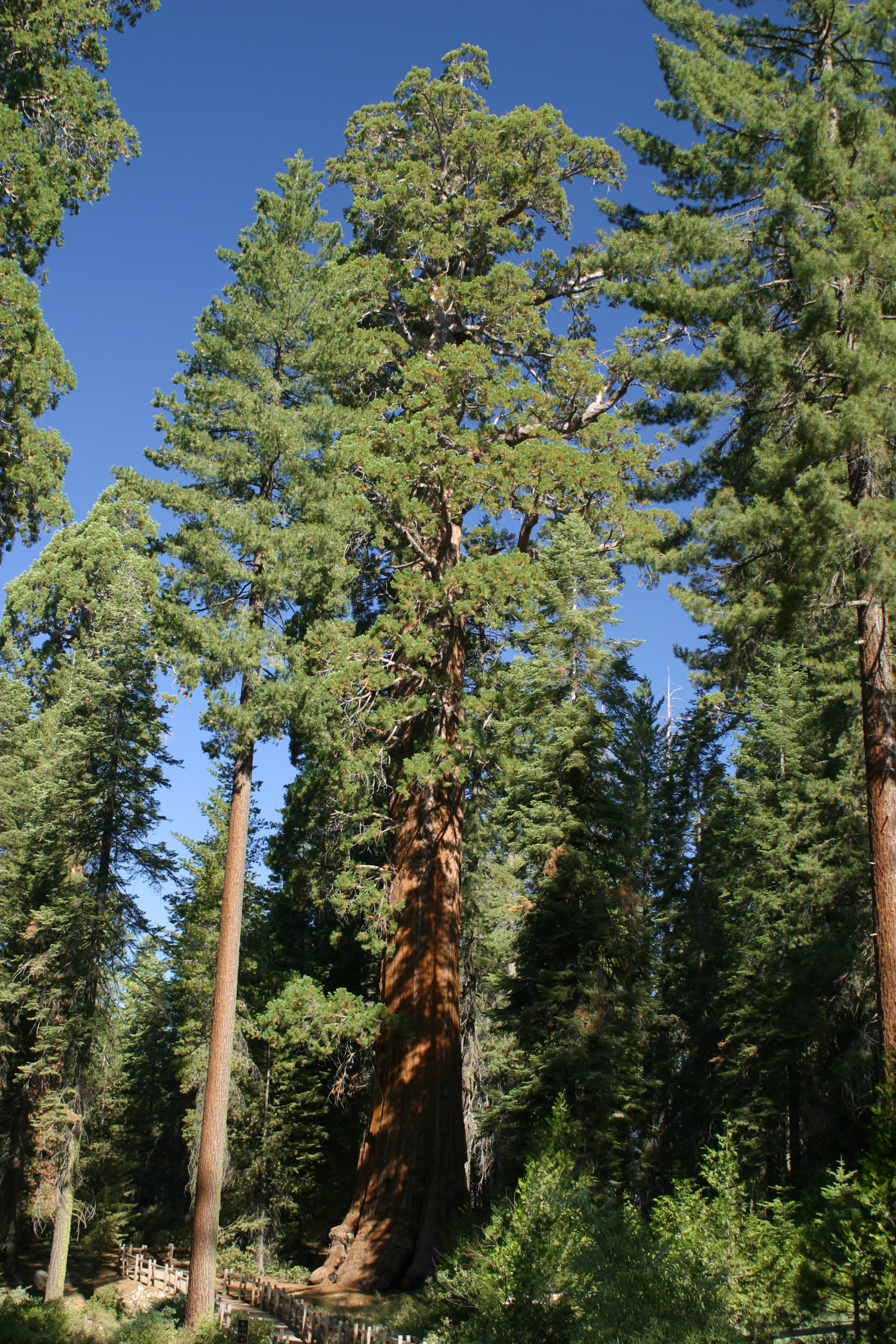
Giant Trees in General Grant Grove

=== Ozone pollution, climate change and the groves' future ===
Another issue of growing importance to the Grove is anthropogenic air pollution. National Park Service employees fear that greenhouse gas emissions have increased temperatures, and that the increased temperatures have already negatively altered the habitats of the national parks and that ozone affects sequoia seedling growth. Research has indicated that climate change has already affected Kings Canyon. Rising temperatures have pushed the snow line higher into the mountains. The higher snow line will likely lessen water storage, change species' habitats, and make fires more severe. Because the sequoias of General Grant Grove thrive under a distinct set of conditions, the impact of climate change could result in habitat loss for the trees, as fewer areas within the park will retain the conditions necessary for the sequoias' survival. Specifically, an increase in the temperature could lead to failure in sequoia regeneration and increased mortality from long droughts. Current restoration plans aim to slow the effects of climate change through reducing air pollution within the parks and the greater San Joaquin Valley. Kings Canyon is among the leading parks in this effort. But since climate change occurs as a result of human activity mainly outside the park, the larger problems of air quality will continue to pose a challenge to the survival of the ancient trees despite efforts by the National Park Service to remedy the impacts.

== Description ==
General Grant Grove consists of a number of sequoia trees situated around a half-mile loop. Visitors have access to a number of trails, including Big Stump Trail, Redwood Canyon Trail, and the Big Baldy Trail. The Panoramic Viewpoint also offers unmatched views of the entire grove. From the viewpoint, hikers have access to a lookout at 7,520 feet to the northeast of Grant Grove. In addition to the General Grant Tree, which stands a colossal 270 feet tall and 107 feet around, Grant Grove is also home to the eleventh largest tree in the world, which stands an imposing 254 feet tall.

== Photo gallery ==
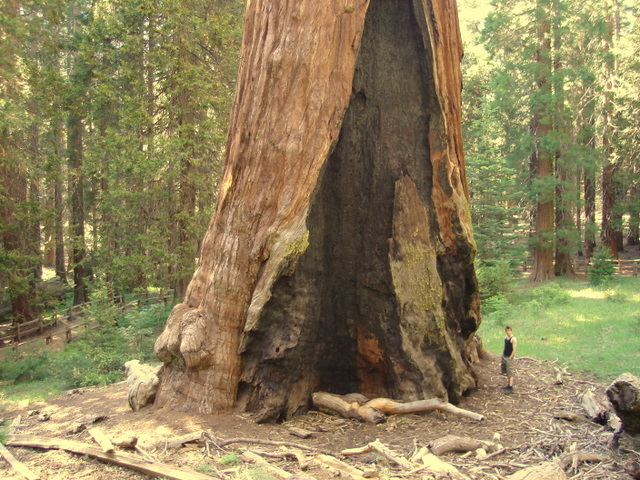
The base of the General Grant tree

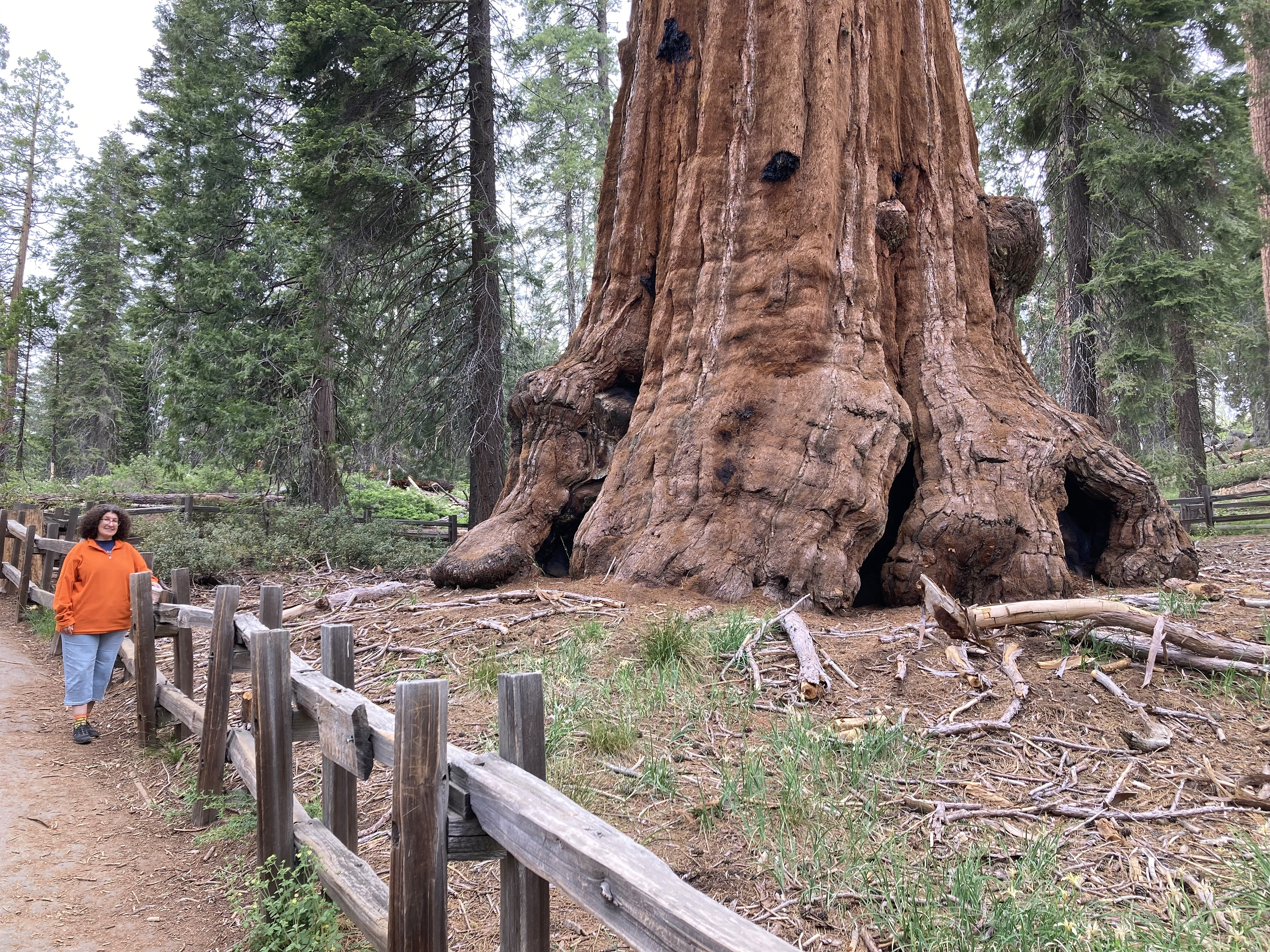
Lincoln Tree

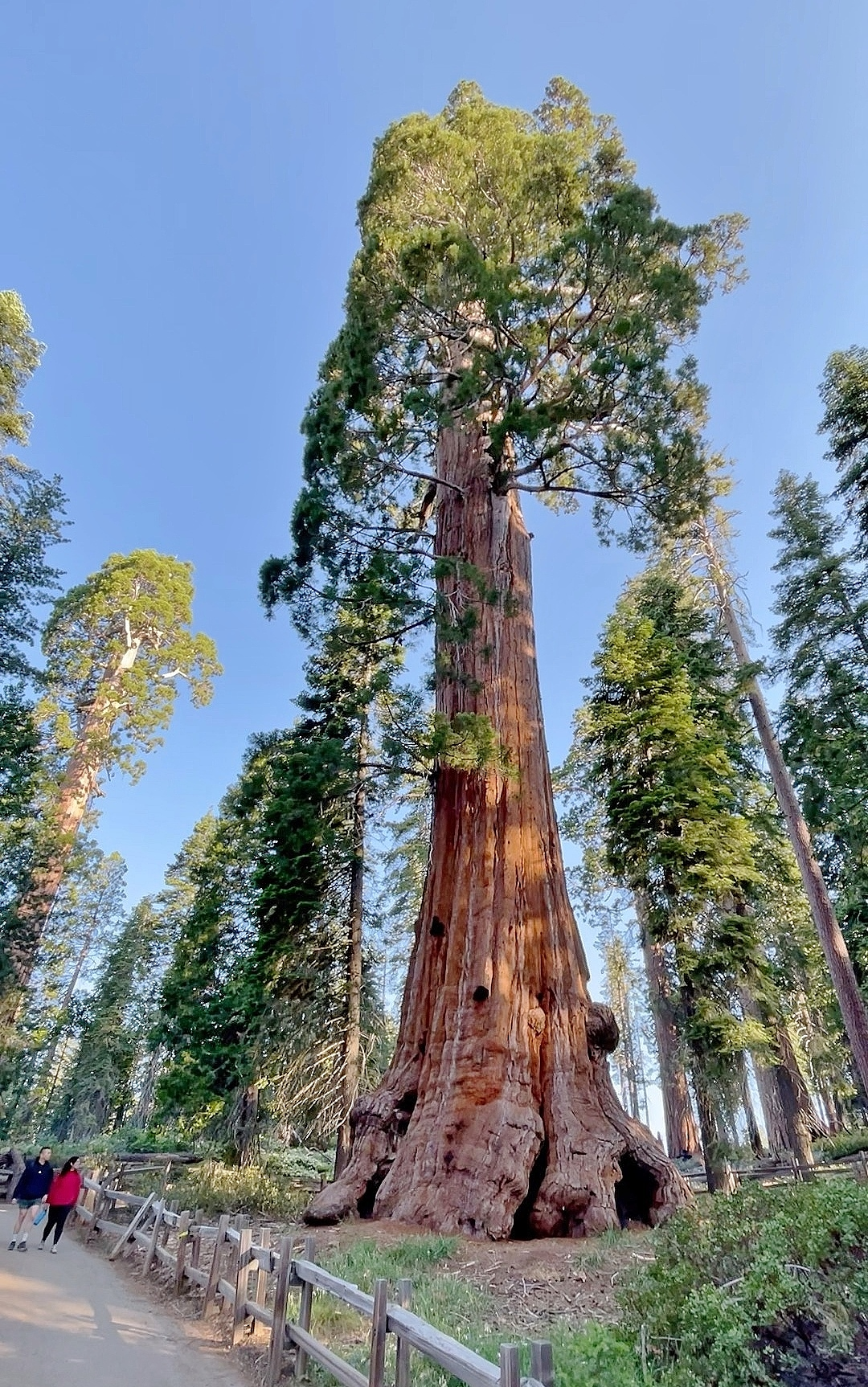
Lincoln Tree (distance)

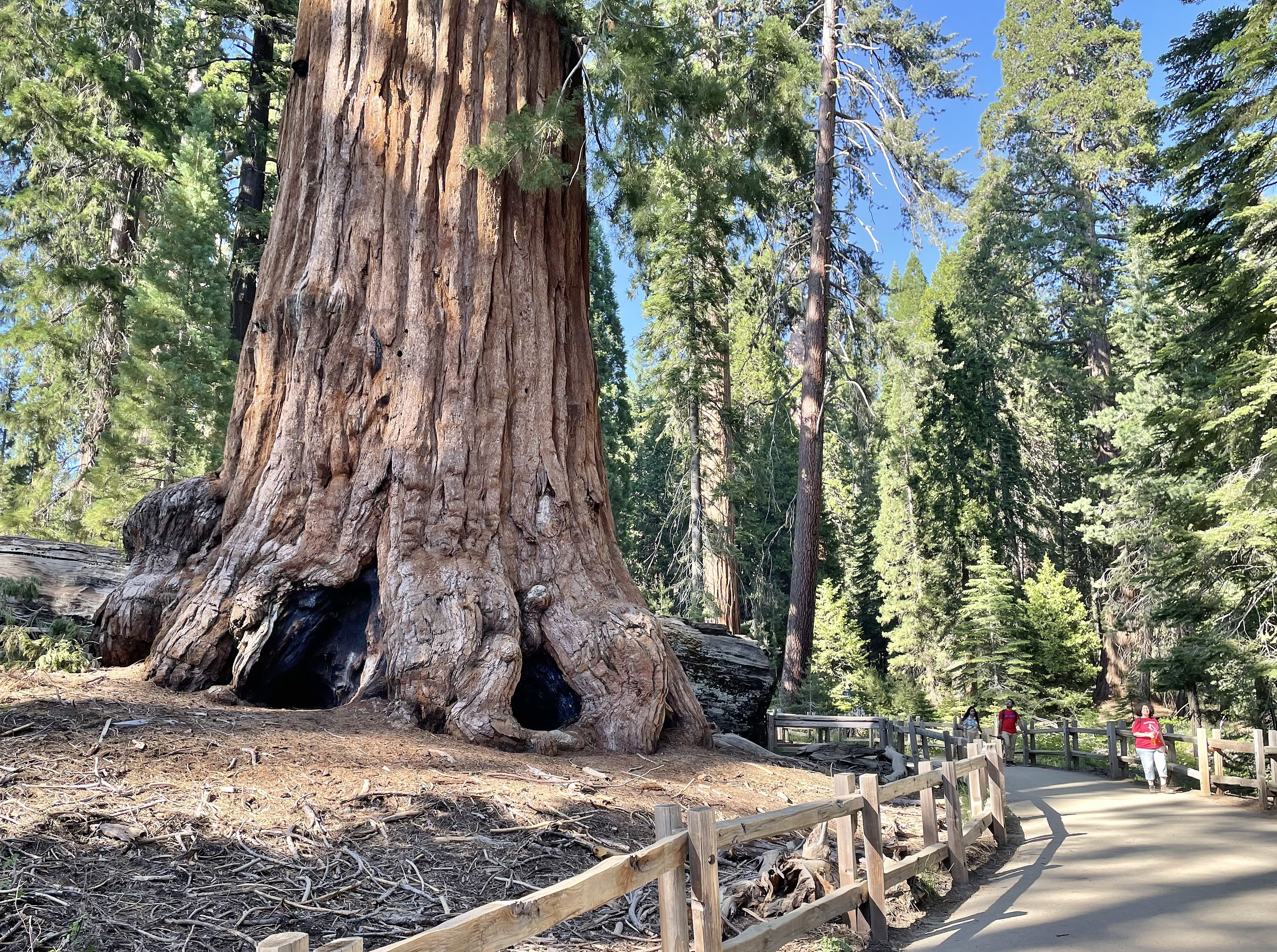
Robert E. Lee Tree

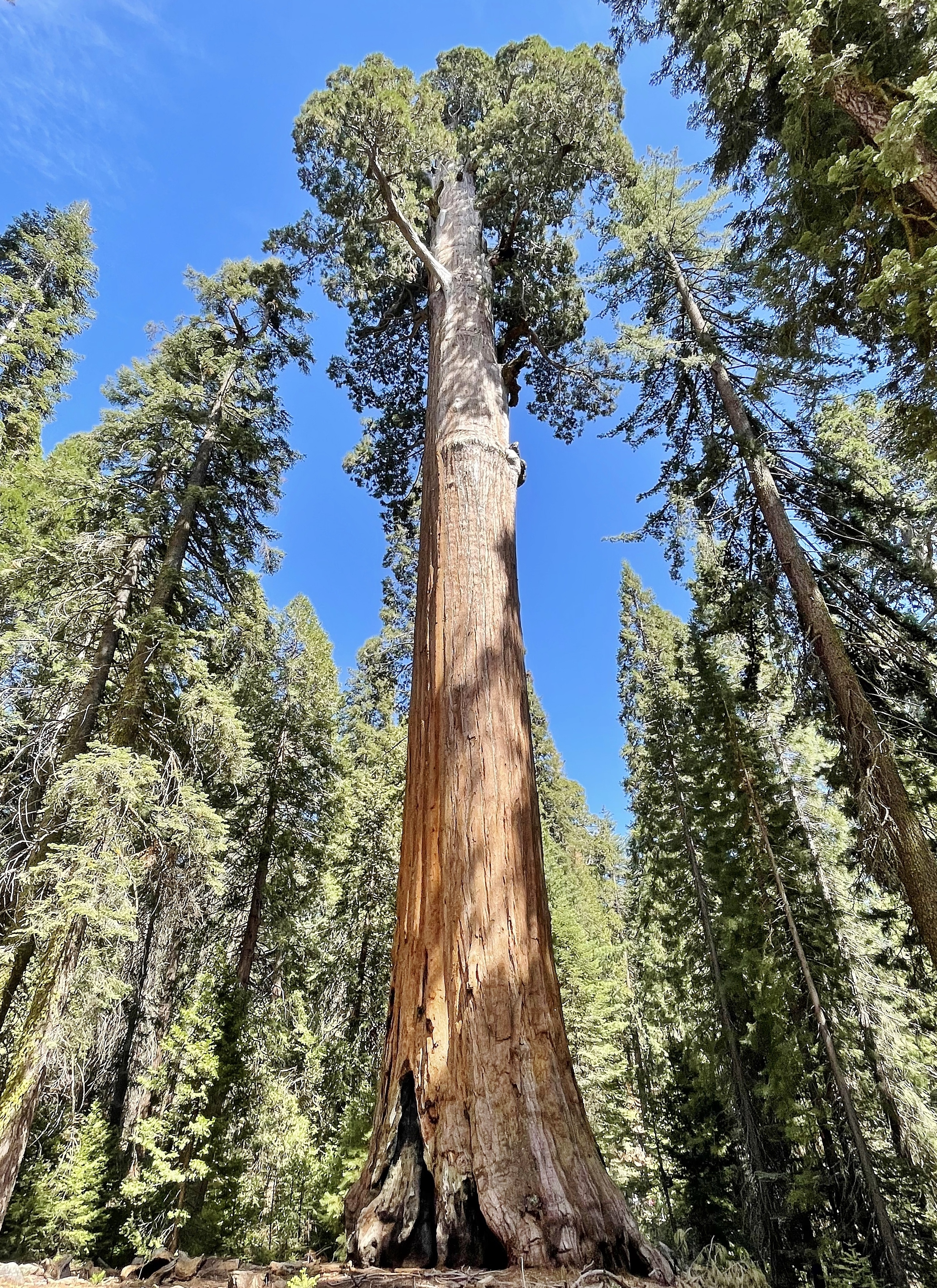
California Tree

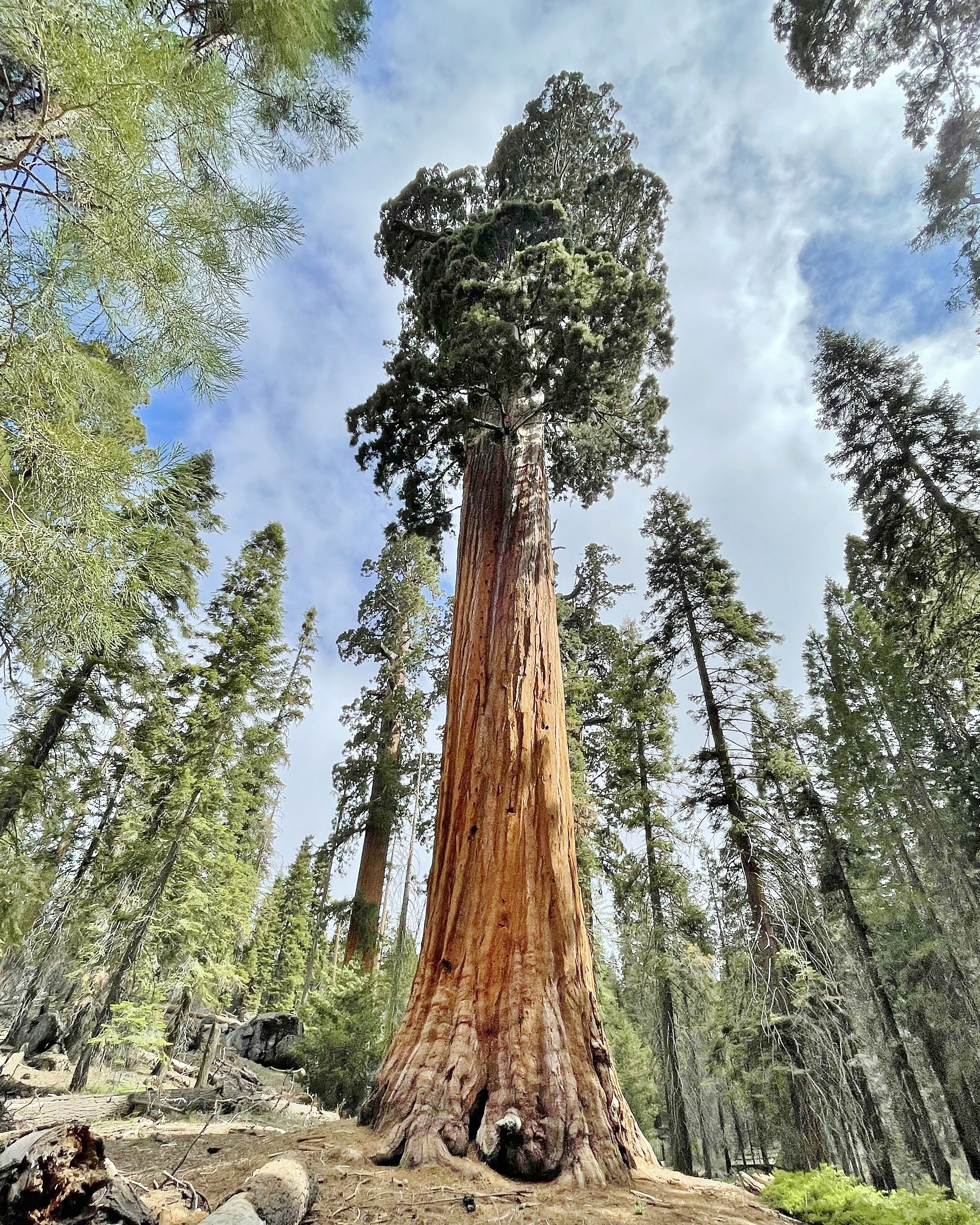
Oregon Tree

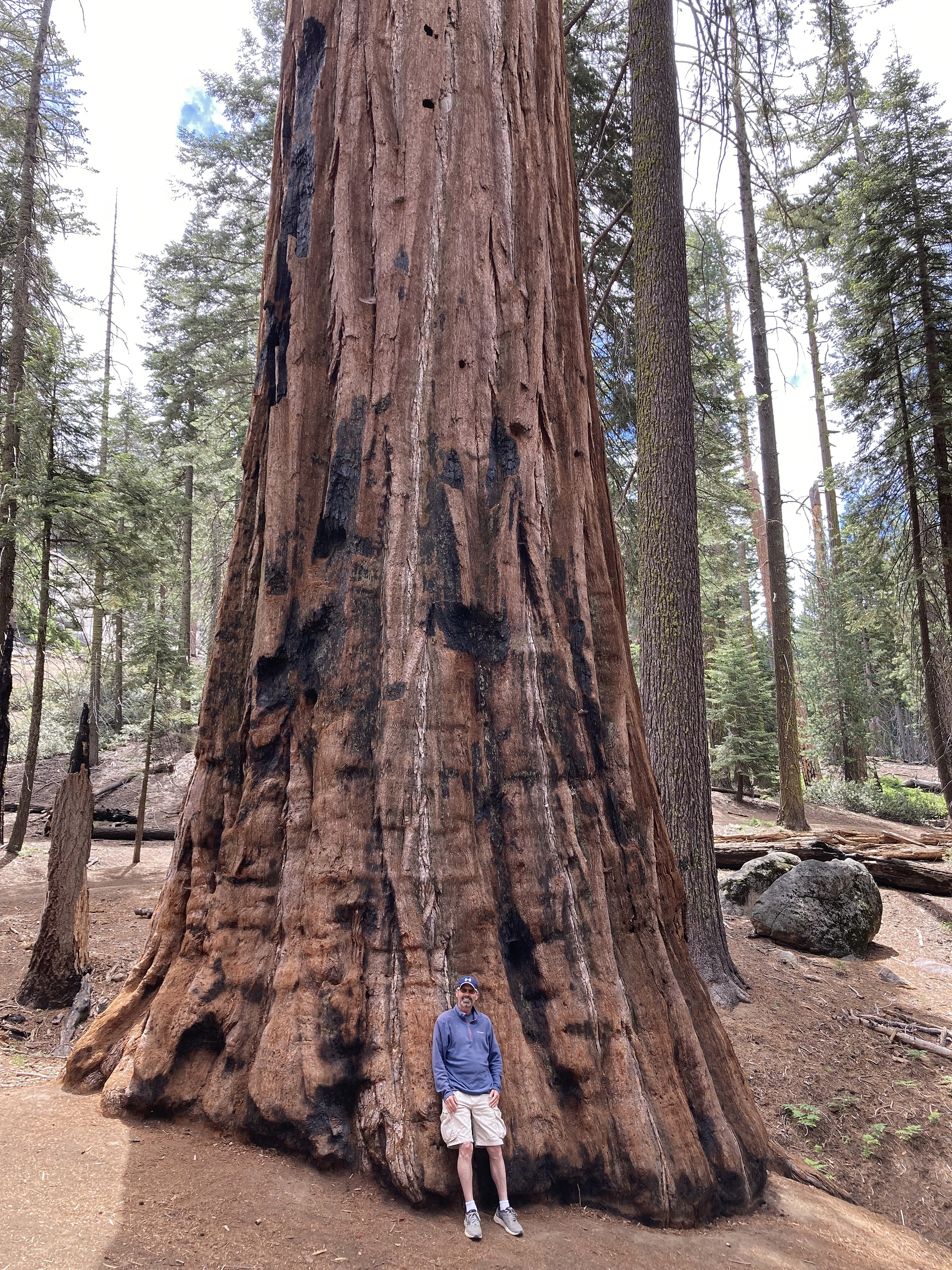
Maryland Tree

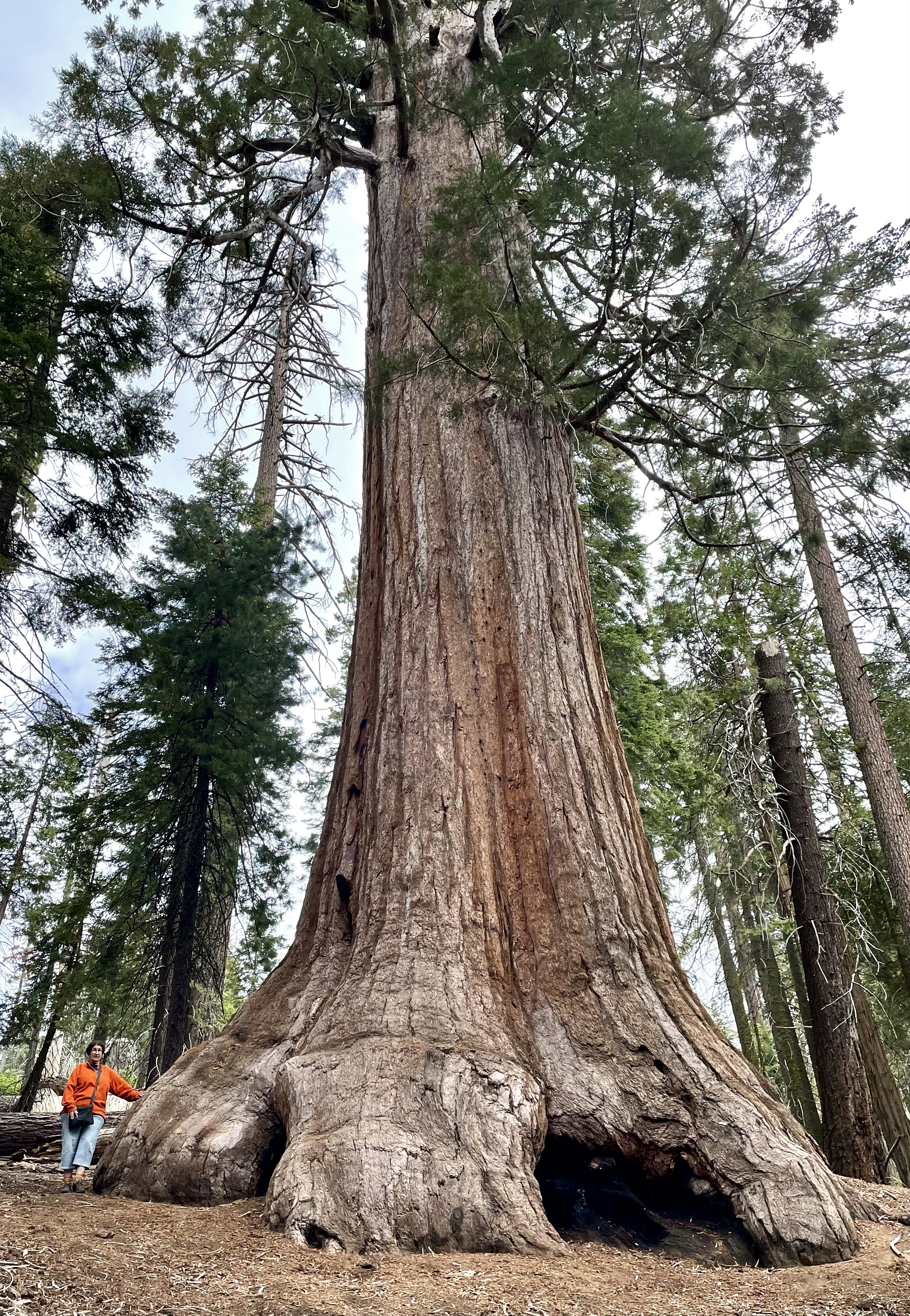
Oklahoma Tree

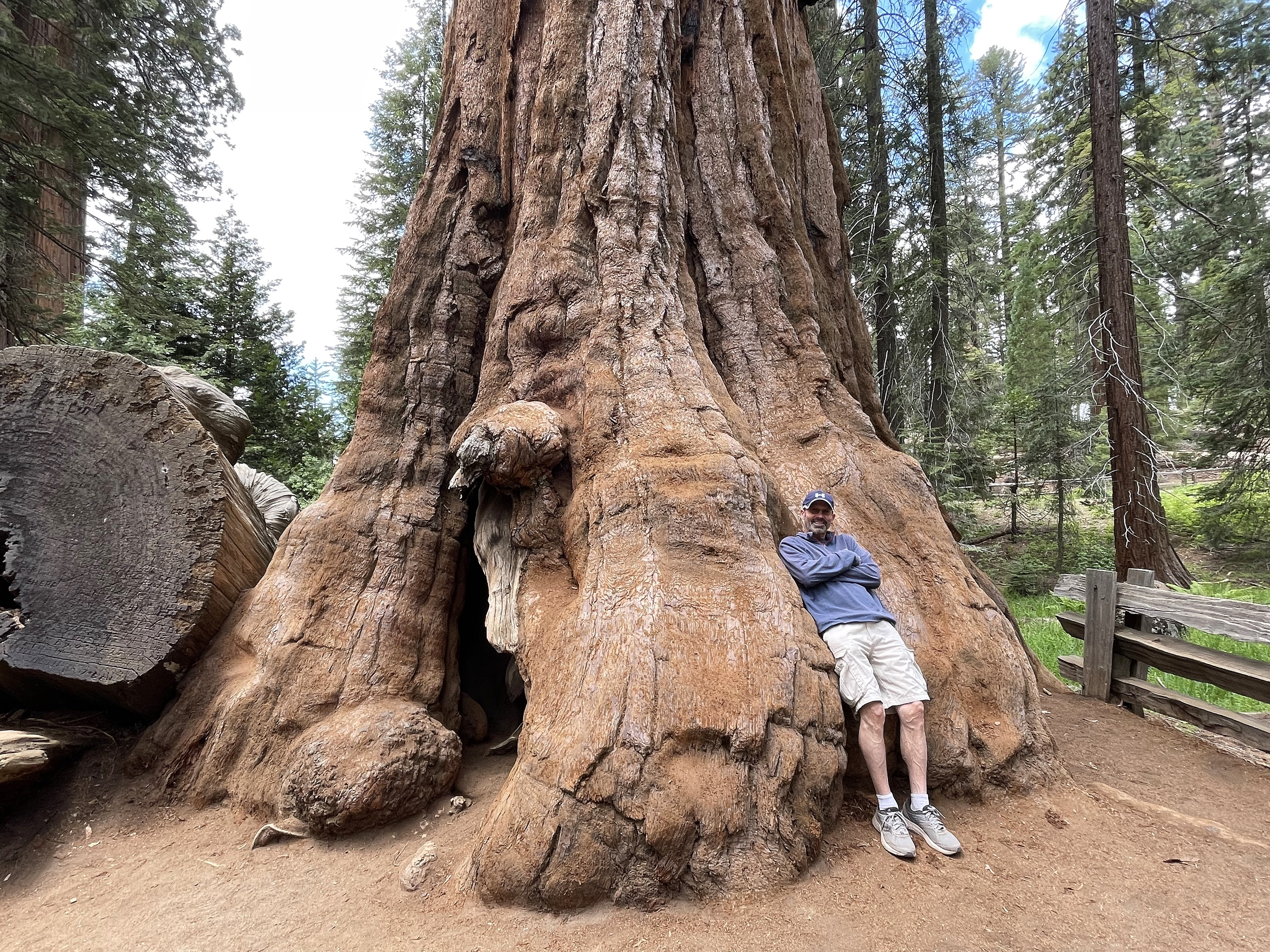
Pennsylvania Tree

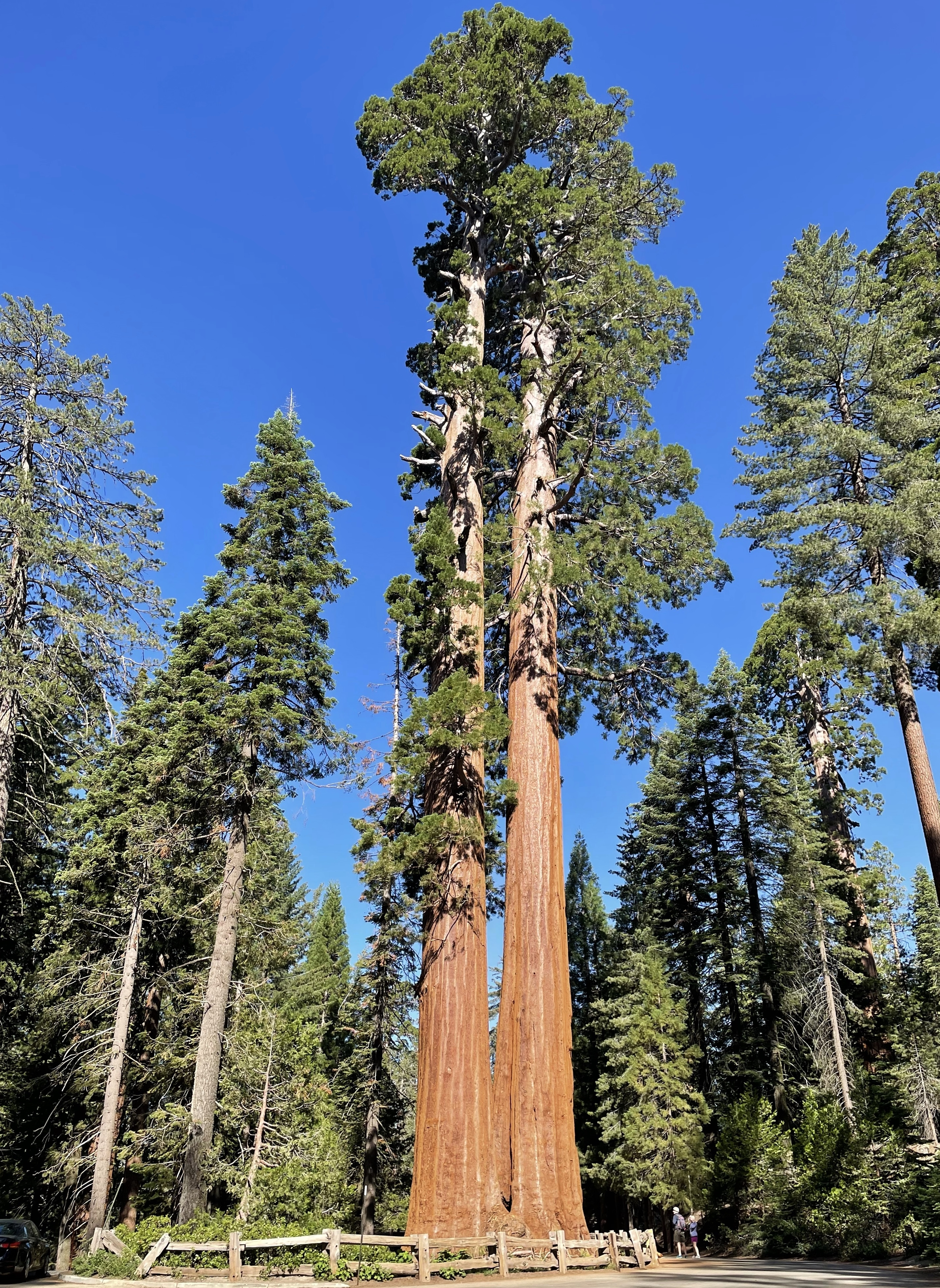
Twin Sisters Trees

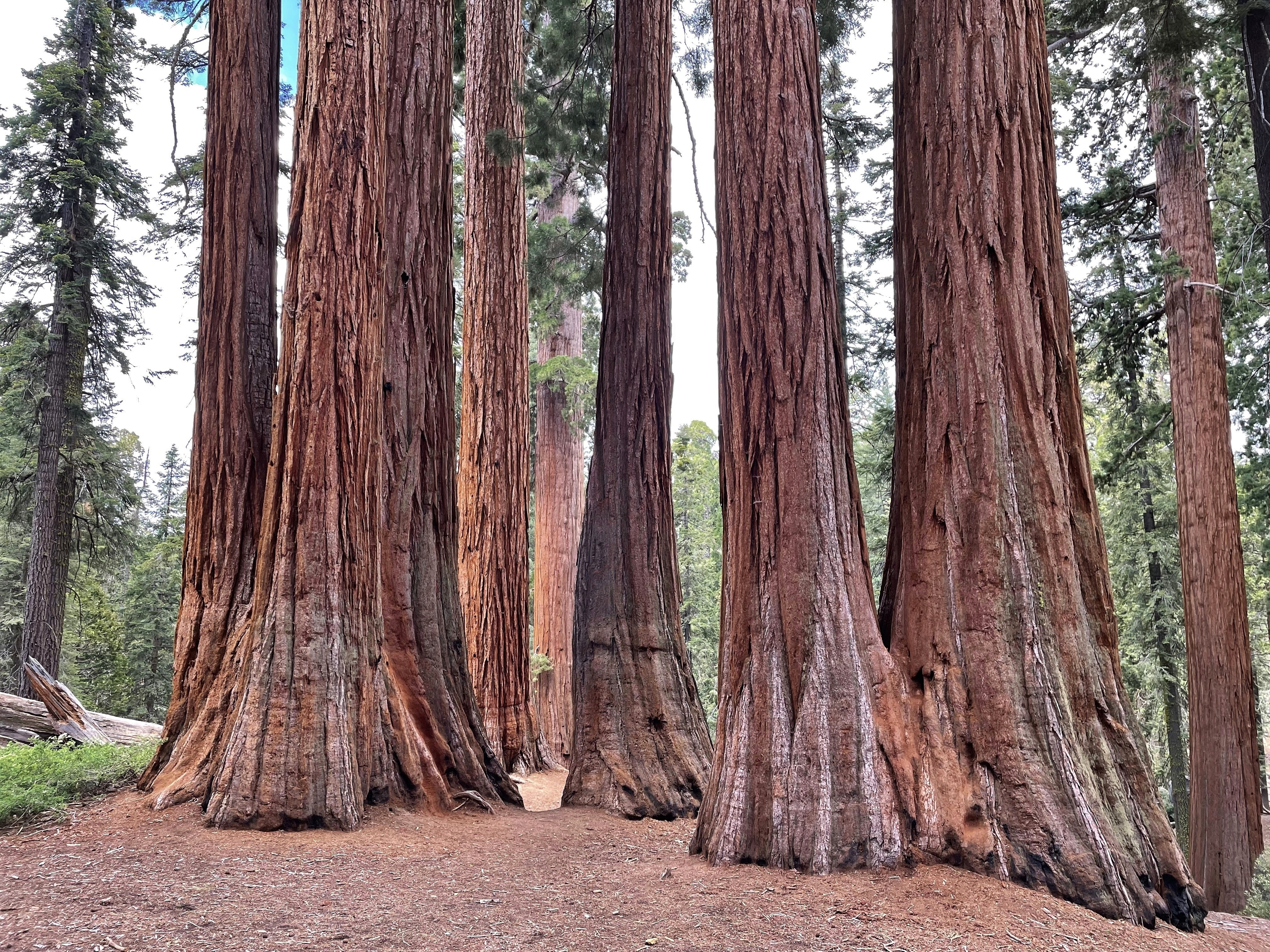
Group of sequoias

== See also ==
- List of giant sequoia groves
- Big Stump Grove
