= General Grant Tree =

Giant sequoia in Kings Canyon National Park, California

Coordinates: 36.7488°N 118.9709°W

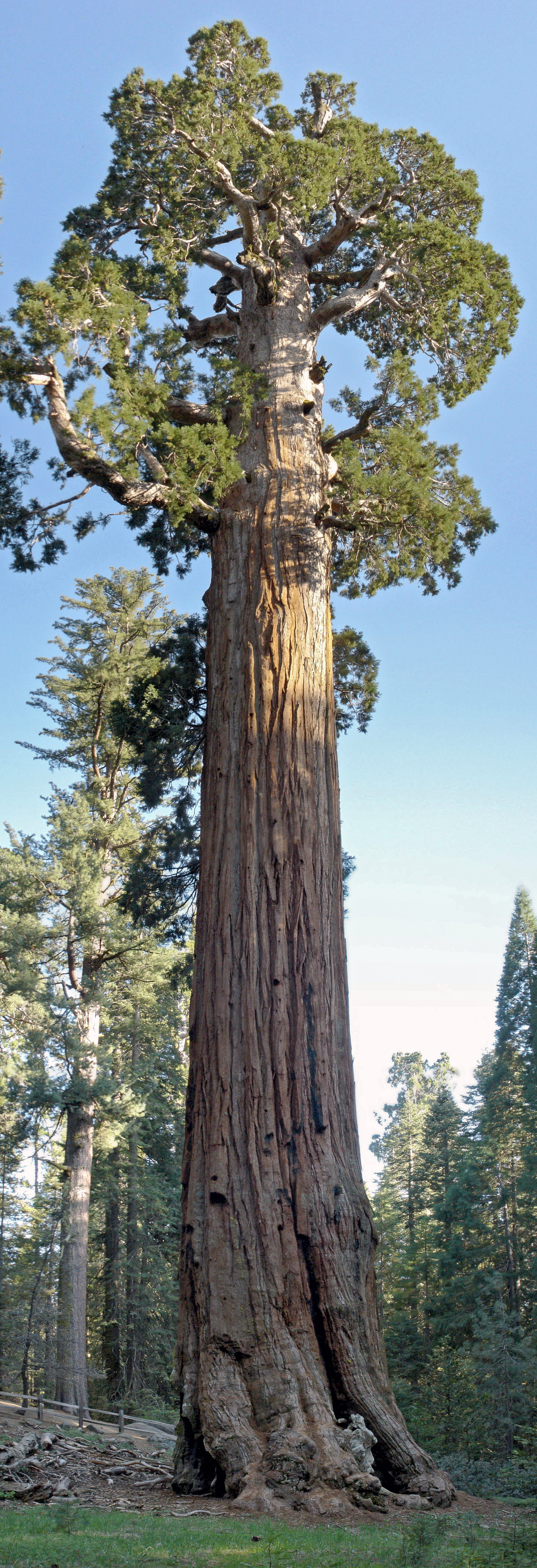
The General Grant Tree is located in General Grant Grove, Kings Canyon National Park

The General Grant Tree is the largest giant sequoia (Sequoiadendron giganteum) in the General Grant Grove section of Kings Canyon National Park in California, and the second largest giant sequoia tree in the world after the General Sherman Tree. Once thought to be well over 2,000 years old, recent estimates suggest the General Grant Tree is closer to 1,650 years old. The tree also features the third largest footprint of any living giant sequoia, measuring 107.6 ft (32.8 m) in circumference at ground level.

== History ==
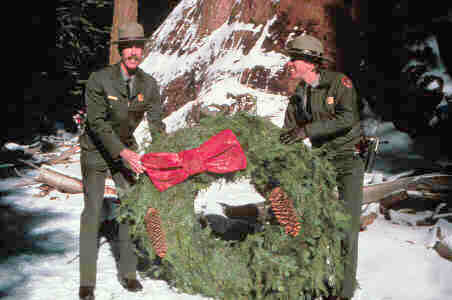
The tree is decorated as the "Nation's Christmas Tree"

The tree was named in 1867 after Ulysses S. Grant, Union Army general and the 18th President of the United States (1869–1877). President Calvin Coolidge proclaimed it the "Nation's Christmas Tree" on April 28, 1926. Due in large part to its huge base, the General Grant Tree was thought to be the largest tree in the world prior to 1931, when the first precise measurements indicated that the General Sherman Tree was slightly larger. On March 29, 1956, President Dwight D. Eisenhower declared the tree a "National Shrine", a memorial to those who died in war. It is the only living object to be so declared.

In September 2003, the General Grant Tree moved up one place in the giant sequoia size rankings when the Washington Tree lost its crown and the hollow upper half of its trunk after a fire caused by a lightning strike.

== Dimensions ==
Height above base	267.4 ft	81.5 m
Circumference at ground	107.6 ft	32.8 m
Diameter 4.5 ft (1.4 m) above highest point on ground	28.9 ft	8.8 m
Diameter 60 ft (18 m) above base	16.3 ft	5.0 m
Diameter 180 ft (55 m) above base	12.9 ft	3.9 m
Estimated bole volume	46,608 ft^{3}	1,320 m^{3}

== See also ==
- List of largest giant sequoias
- List of individual trees
- List of oldest trees
