= Big Stump Grove =

Giant sequoia grove in Kings Canyon National Park, California, United States

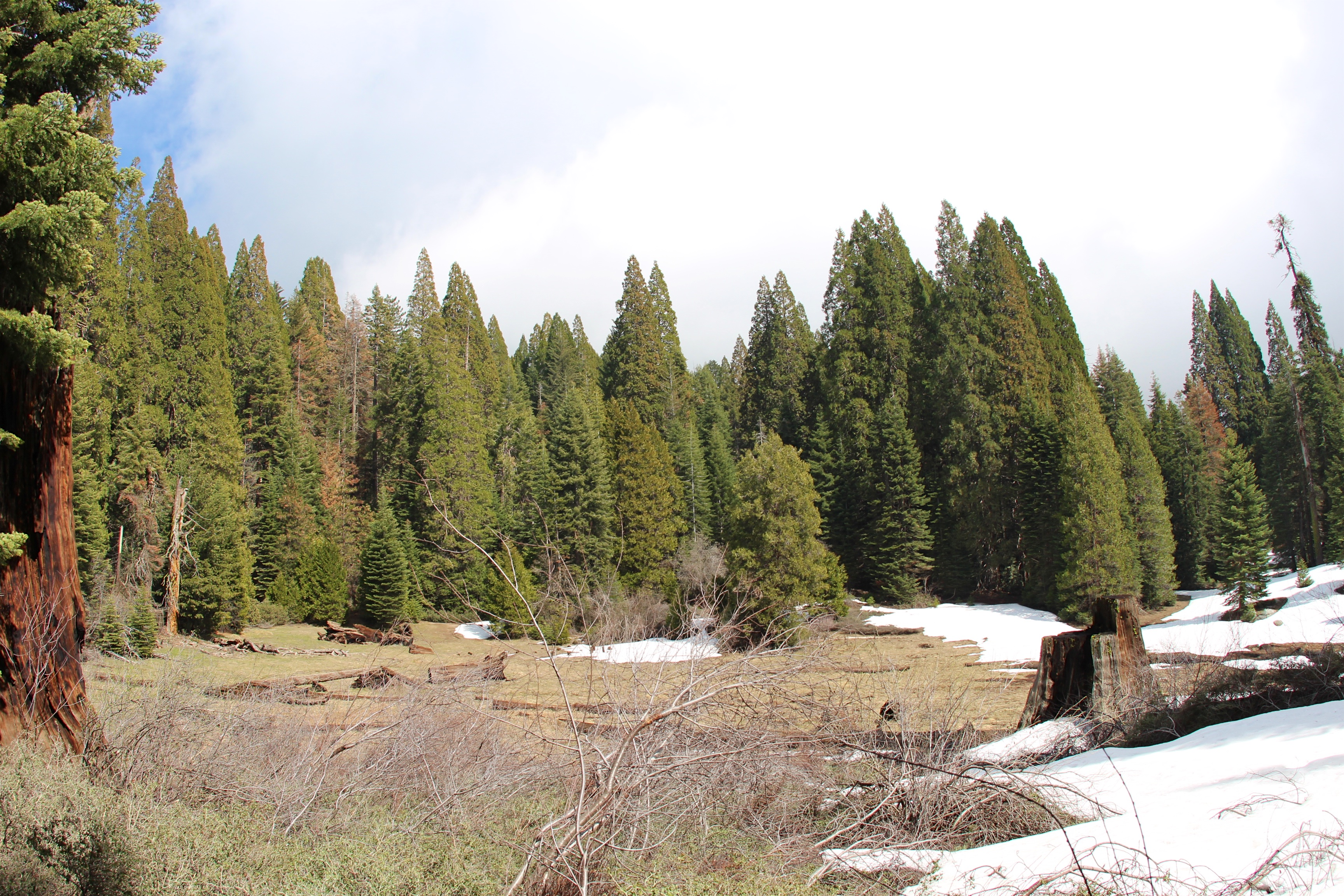
- Big Stump Grove

- Location within California
- Interactive map of Big Stump Grove

Geography
- Location: Kings Canyon National Park, California, United States
- Coordinates: 36°43′02″N 118°57′55″W
- Elevation: 6,070 ft (1,850 m)

Ecology
- Dominant tree species: Sequoiadendron giganteum

Big Stump Grove is a giant sequoia grove located at the southwest entrance of Kings Canyon National Park in the Sierra Nevada of California. It is one of a group of eight close but narrowly separated Giant Sequoia groves situated in Giant Sequoia National Monument and Kings Canyon National Park.

== Overview ==
The grove derives its name from Old Adam, sometimes also referred to as the Burnt Monarch. It is a large standing sequoia snag, which had died prior to logging in that area.

== Noteworthy trees ==
Some trees found in the grove that are worthy of special note include:

- Mark Twain Stump: the stump of what was once one of the largest giant sequoias in the world. Felled in 1891 so that sections of the trunk could be displayed in the natural history museums of New York and London. The remainder of the tree was cut up for grape stakes and fence posts.
- The Sawed Tree: a giant sequoia that bears the scars of deep cuts from a crosscut saw made sometime during the late 19th century, though the tree remains perfectly healthy.
- Old Adam: a dead giant sequoia with an especially gnarled and decayed appearance.
- The Resurrection Tree: located at the beginning of Big Stump Grove trail, this is one of only two old growth sequoia trees still standing in the grove.

== Gallery ==
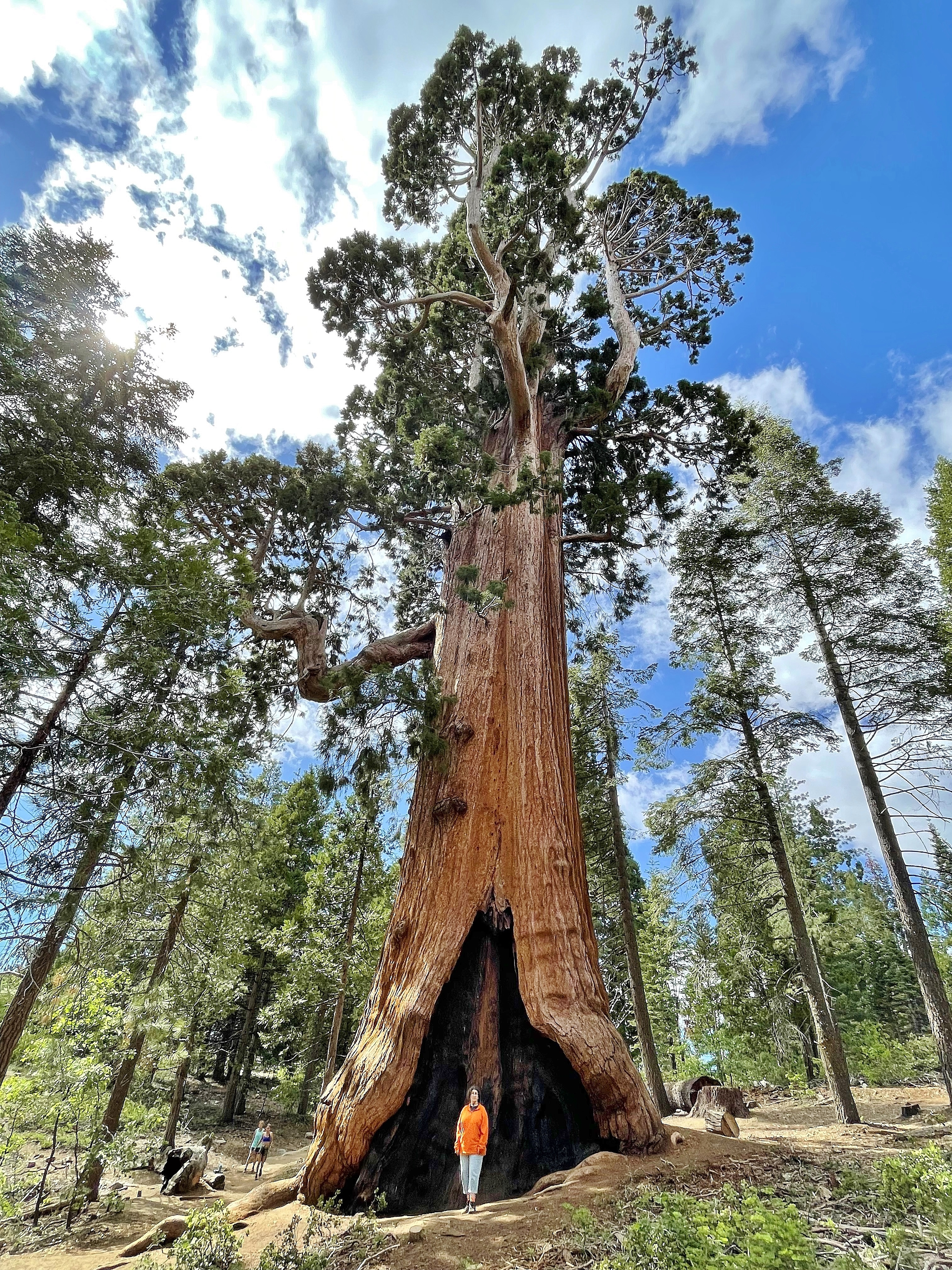
Resurrection Tree, June 2022

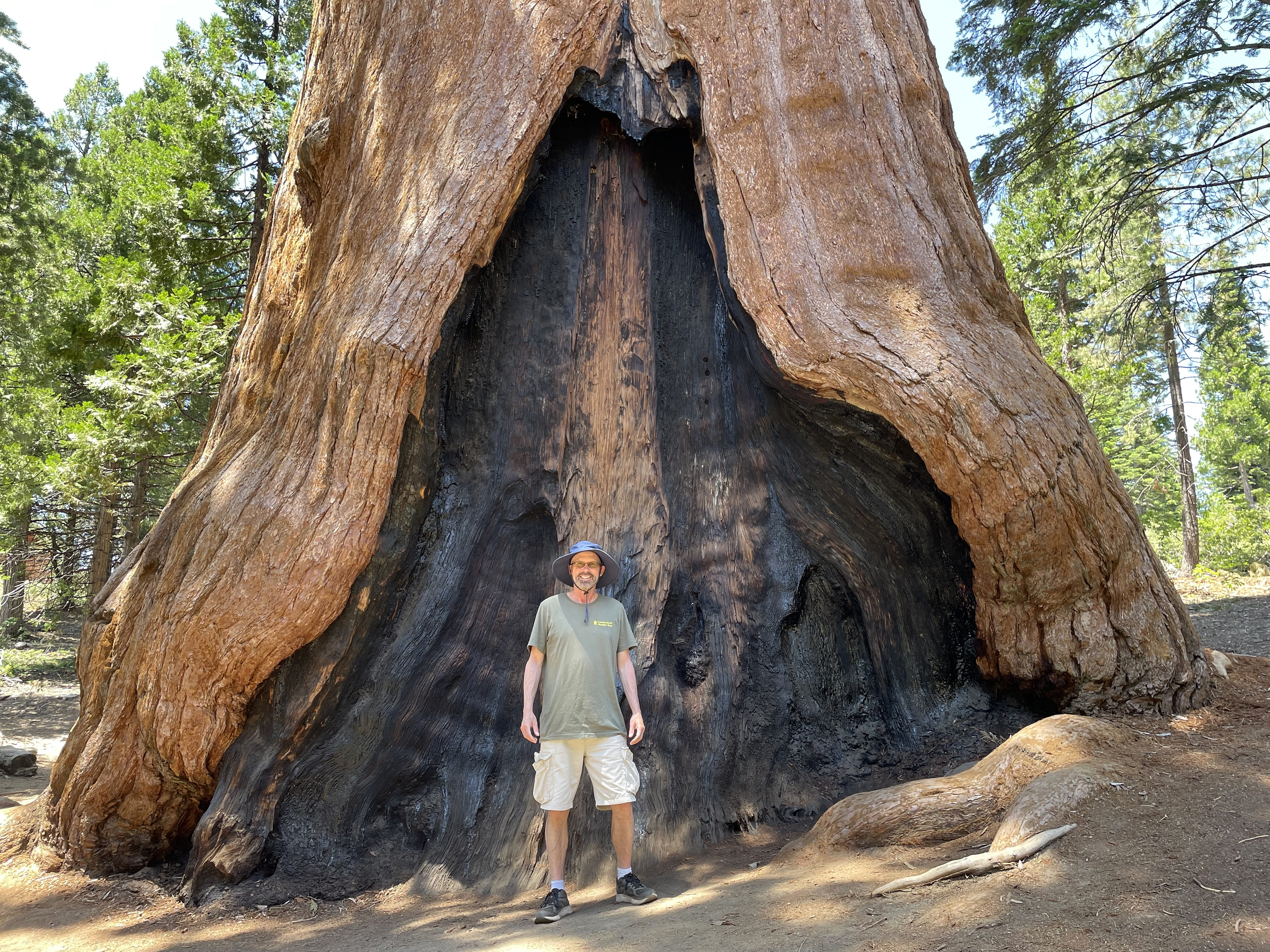
Resurrection Tree, July 2023

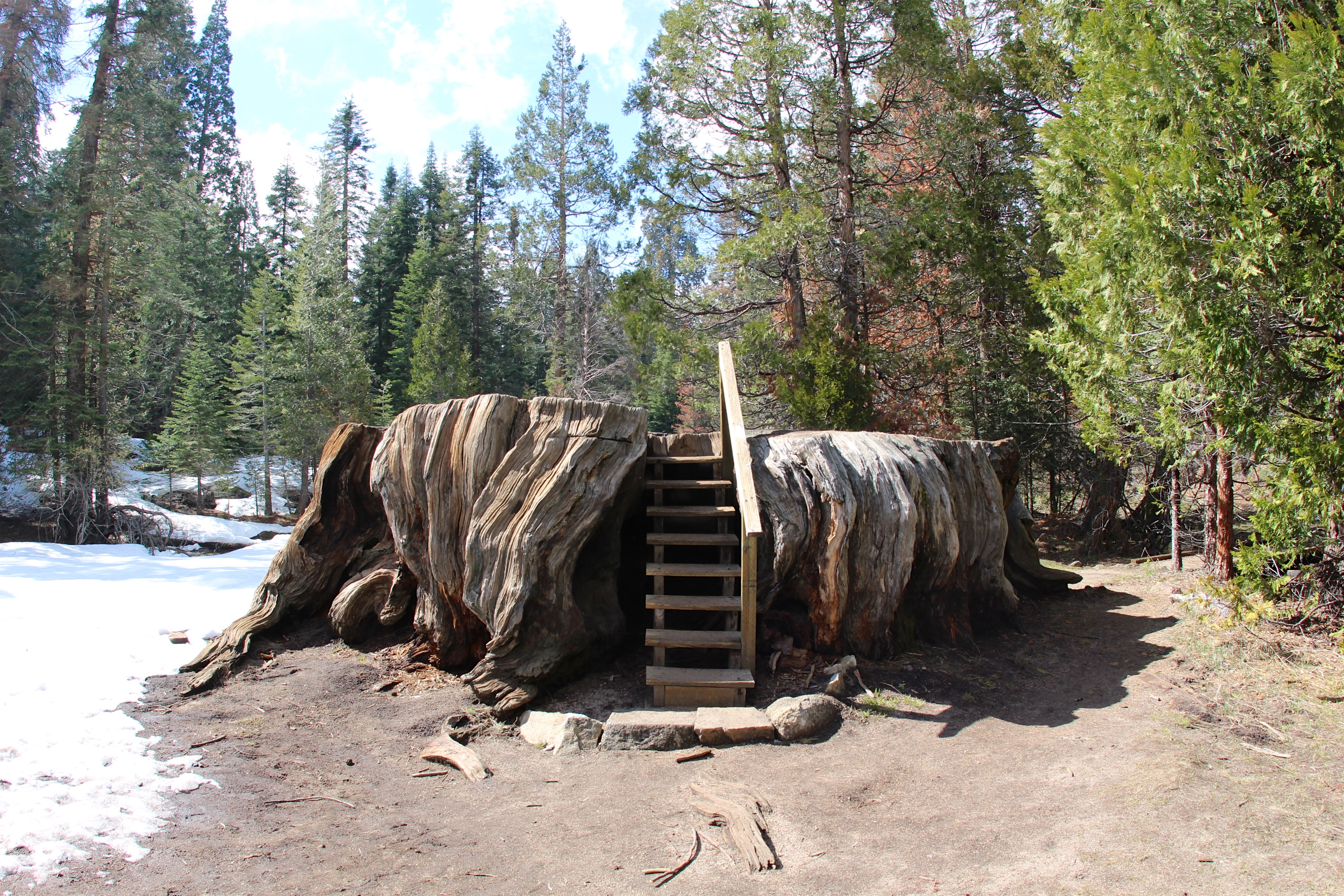
Mark Twain Stump, March 2016

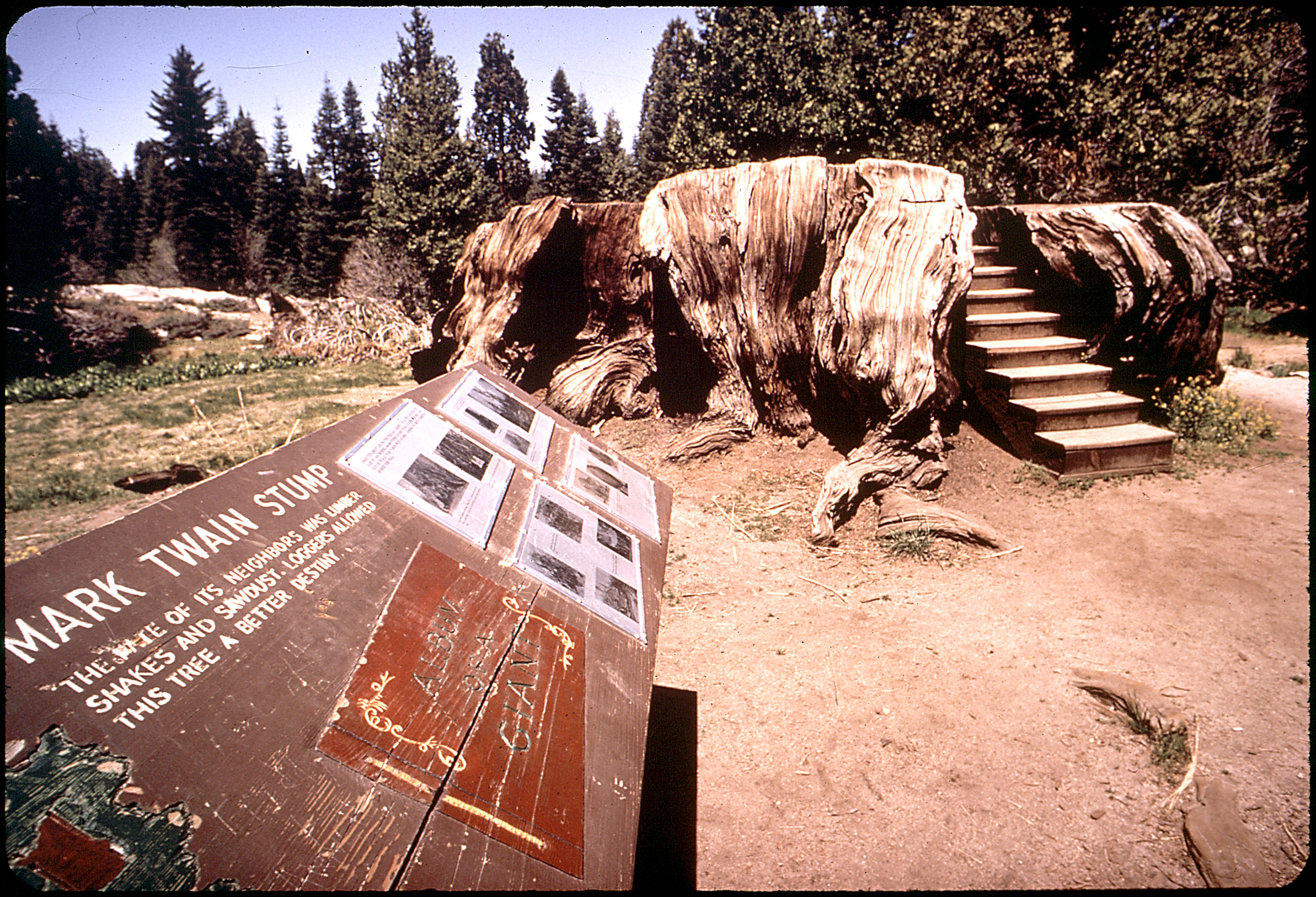
Mark Twain Stump in May 1972

== See also ==
- List of giant sequoia groves
- General Grant Grove
